= Hôtel de Besenval =

Coordinates: 48.8583°N 2.3159°E

- Embassy of the Swiss Confederation in France
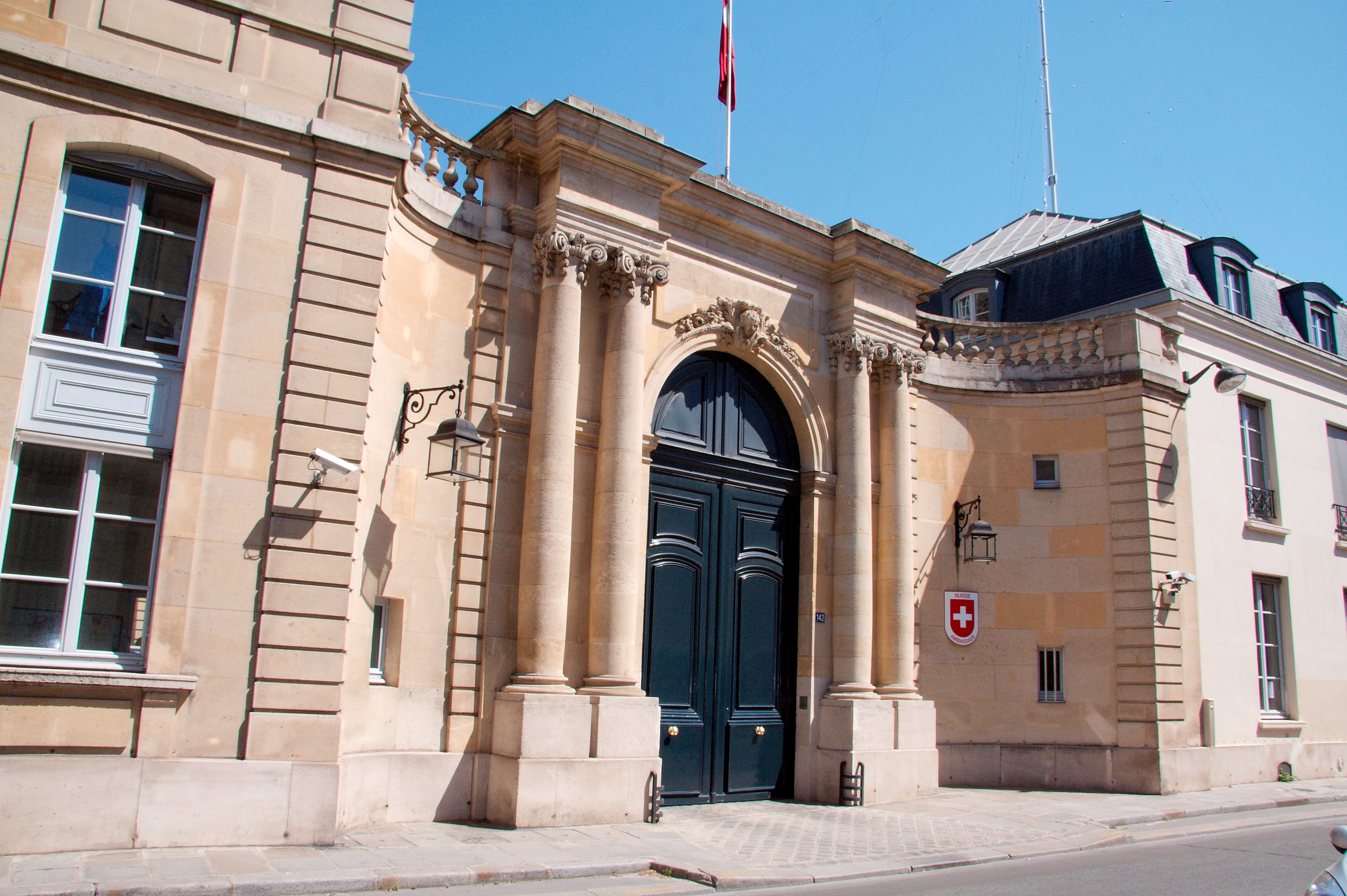
- Main entrance of the Hôtel de Besenval
- Former names: Hôtel Chanac de Pompadour

General information
- Type: Hôtel particulier
- Location: 142 Rue de Grenelle, Paris, France
- Current tenants: (Switzerland) Embassy of the Swiss Confederation
- Construction started: 4 June 1704 (signing of the construction contract)
- Completed: 1866 (corps de logis enlarged with another floor and an attic with a comble à la Mansart)
- Owner: (Switzerland) Swiss Confederation

Design and construction
- Architects: Pierre-Alexis Delamair and Alexandre-Théodore Brongniart

The Hôtel de Besenval (French pronunciation: [otɛl d(ə) bəzɑ̃val]) is a historic hôtel particulier in Paris, dating largely from the 18th century, with a cour d'honneur and a large English landscape garden, an architectural style commonly known as entre cour et jardin. This refers to a residence located between a front courtyard and a rear garden. The building is listed as a monument historique by decree of 20 October 1928 (the historic parts, reference: PA00088705). It has housed the Embassy of the Swiss Confederation and the residence of the Swiss ambassador to France since 1938. The residence is named after its most famous former owner: Pierre Victor, Baron de Besenval de Brunstatt, usually just referred to as Baron de Besenval (the suffix Brunstatt refers to the former barony).

== Location ==
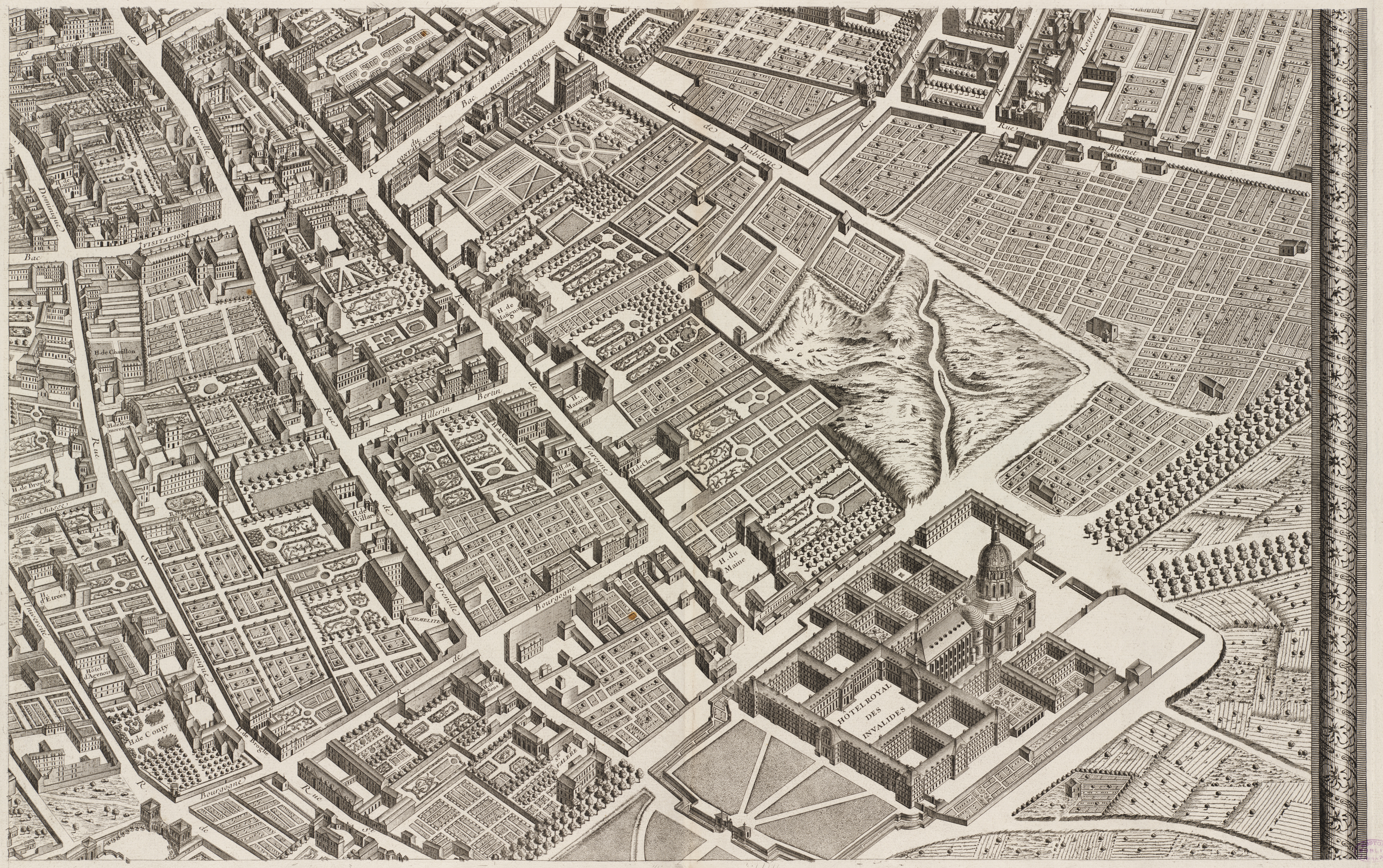
The Hôtel Chanac de Pompadour on the Turgot map of Paris (sheet 16) from 1737 (parcelle n° 19), next to the Couvent de Sainte-Valère (at the bottom of the image), whose construction began in the same year as that of the Hôtel Chanac de Pompadour. The convent church was auctioned off in 1838 and subsequently demolished to make way for the new Hôtel de Monaco, commissioned by the banker William Williams-Hope, Baron Hope (1802–1855). Today, the Hôtel de Monaco houses the residence of the Ambassador of Poland. In the immediate vicinity of the Hôtel Chanac de Pompadour is the Hôtel de Sens (east side), which is now called Hôtel de Noirmoutier.

The premises, formerly known as the Hôtel Chanac de Pompadour, are located at 142 Rue de Grenelle in the 7th arrondissement of Paris, within the Faubourg Saint-Germain, west of the historic Saint-Germain-des-Prés area, opposite the Hôtel du Châtelet and close to the Hôtel des Invalides.

=== Les ors de la République – inherited from the monarchy ===
The Faubourg Saint-Germain has long been known as the favourite area of the French nobility and is home to numerous aristocratic hôtels particuliers. Many of these residences later became foreign embassies or ambassadorial residences, as well as administrative headquarters of the city of Paris or seats of French ministries. This development was also a consequence of the French Revolution, during which many hôtels particuliers – with their large reception rooms, gilded panelling and exquisite decoration – were confiscated and converted into national institutions. The French expression Les ors de la République (the gilded splendour of the Republic), which refers to the luxurious environment of national palaces, official residences and institutions such as the Palais de l'Élysée, the Hôtel de Matignon and the Palais du Luxembourg, dates from this period. The Hôtel de Besenval was one of the few hôtels particuliers not to be confiscated, as its then owner, Pierre Victor, Baron de Besenval de Brunstatt, was a Swiss citizen.

=== From the Marais to the Faubourg Saint-Germain ===
In the early 18th century, the French nobility started to move from the Marais, the then aristocratic district of Paris where nobles used to build their hotels particuliers, to the clearer, less populated and less polluted Faubourg Saint-Germain; an area which soon became the new residential area of France's highest ranking nobility. Families like those of the Duc d'Estrées, the Duc du Châtelet or the Duc de Noirmoutier moved there. Their former residences still bear their names today. Therefore, the instinct of the early investors was right when they bought at the beginning of the 18th century their plots of land on what would soon become one of the best addresses in Paris: The Rue de Grenelle.

== History ==
=== Hôtel Chanac de Pompadour ===
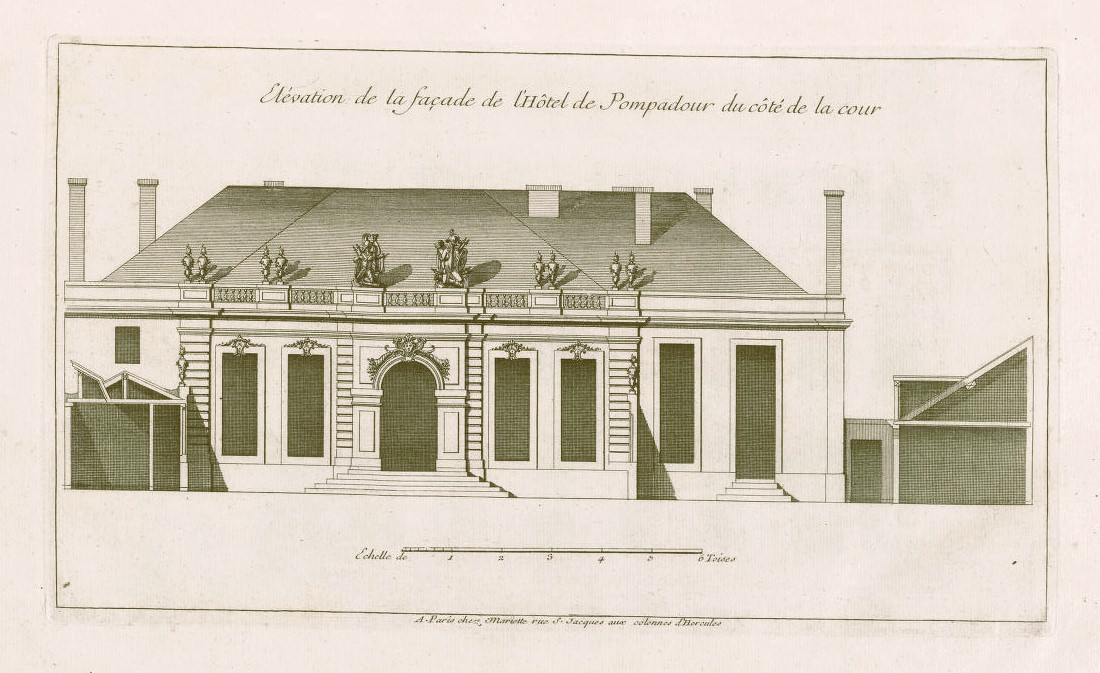
The historic façade of the corps de logis of the single-storey residence Hôtel Chanac de Pompadour, later called Hôtel de Besenval, towards the courtyard, according to the plans of 1704 by Pierre-Alexis Delamair (engraving published by Jean Mariette in 1727).

The origins of the Hôtel de Besenval go back to a single-storey residence, the Hôtel Chanac de Pompadour, erected from 1704 for a man of the Church: Pierre Hélie Chanac de Pompadour, Baron de Treignac, Abbé de Vigeois, Prieur de La Valette and Prévost d'Arnac (1623–1710). When the construction work began, the abbé was already in his eighties. It is believed that the abbé was a descendant of the family of Guillaume V de Chanac and Guillaume de Chanac, a supporter of the Collège de Chanac Pompadour in Paris.

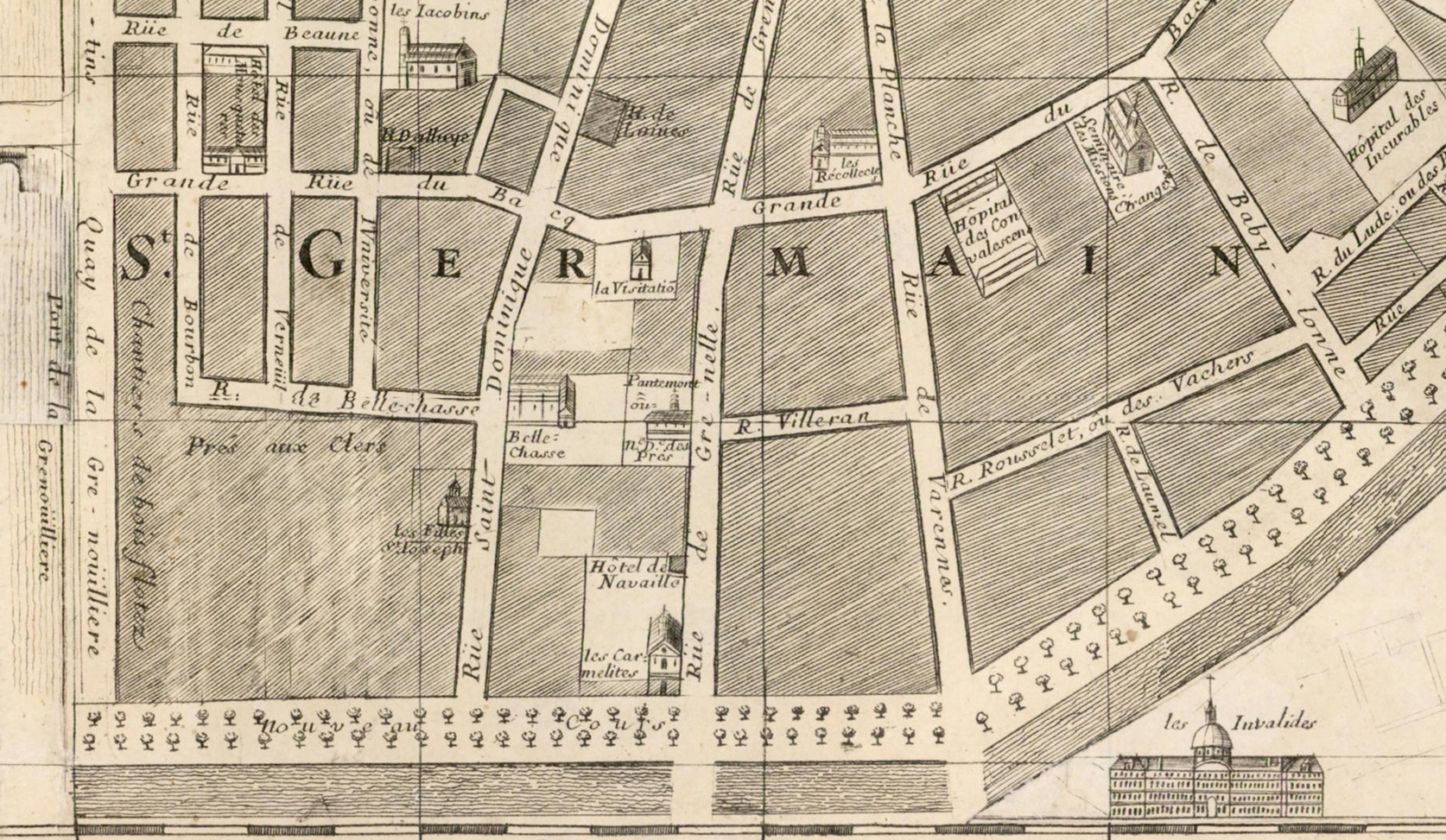
Site plan of the Saint-Germain district in Paris (detail) on the map by Guillaume Monbard from 1694. The future building plot of the Hôtel Chanac de Pompadour on the Rue de Grenelle lies between the Nouveau Cours (the allée) and the building labeled Les Carmelites (the proportions of the plan are not accurate).

To build his new residence, the abbé purchased three plots of land on 10 May 1704 for a total of 14,872 livres and had them combined into a single large plot. On 9 December 1704, the abbé had the opportunity to buy two more plots of land for a total of 2,340 livres and add them to his property. For the design of his hôtel particulier the abbé commissioned the celebrated architect Pierre-Alexis Delamair. Delamair, in turn, commissioned the building contractor Guillaume Delavergne († 1710) on 4 June 1704, on behalf of the abbé, to carry out his plans for the new residence, with the total costs estimated at 31,000 livres. Additional costs of 11,953 livres and 7 sols were added later. This sum was set on 19 March 1710 by a commission of experts following a site visit, after relations among those involved in the construction had deteriorated due to financial disputes. At this time, the abbé had not yet taken up residence in his new house. Since he died six months later, it can be assumed that he never lived in his hôtel particulier on the Rue de Grenelle, or he only lived there for a very short time. This and the abbé's old age suggest that he did not have the town house built primarily for himself, but for his heirs. This is also indicated by the donation agreement of 13 March 1705 with the heirs, who were to pay the abbé an annual pension of 2,400 livres.

Pierre-Alexis Delamair was highly sought after at the time, and he was simultaneously involved in two other major building projects in Paris: The remodeling of the Hôtel de Clisson, also known as the Hôtel de Guise, for François de Rohan, Prince de Soubise, which subsequently became the Hôtel de Soubise, and the construction of the Hôtel de Rohan for Armand Gaston Maximilien, Prince de Rohan.

==== Pierre-Alexis Delamair's architectural one-off ====
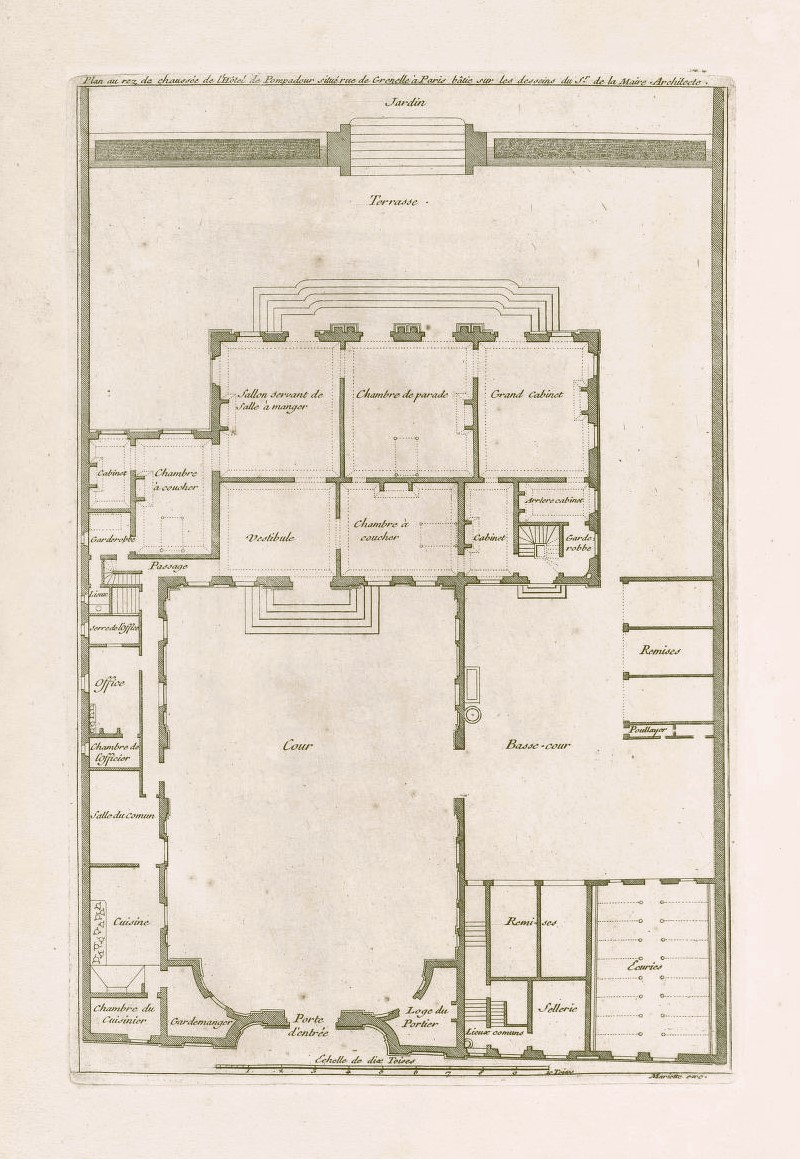
Plan of the Hôtel Chanac de Pompadour, published by Jean Mariette in 1727, which, however, is likely to be largely identical to the original plan from 1704 by Delamair (the original plan is considered lost). Visible are the ground floors of the corps de logis as well as of the outbuildings around the cour d'honneur and the basse-cour. The garden was on different levels at the time. It was in the Sallon servant de Salle à manger, now called the Salon des perroquets, where the Royal Dinner took place on 16 March 1778 in the course of the affair: An Incident at the Opera Ball on Mardi Gras in 1778.

The Hôtel Chanac de Pompadour is a notable feature in Delamair's work, as it is the only single-storey hôtel particulier he designed. As a result, its principal reception rooms (the piano nobile) are located on the ground floor – an arrangement that appears to have been rare among Parisian hôtels particuliers. With the Hôtel Chanac de Pompaodur, Delamair also set new standards in façade architecture. The sober, linear neoclassical façade was a novelty and a contrast to the ornate façades that had prevailed up to that point. Architects who later made changes to the building always respected Delamair's basic structure and design.

In his book titled: Description de la ville de Paris et de tout ce qu'elle contient de plus remarquable (Description of the city of Paris and all the most remarkable things that it contains), first published in 1684 and expanded in later editions, Germain Brice describes the Hôtel Chanac de Pompadour as a pleasant place. However, he also states: "Abbé Pierre Hélie Chanac de Pompadour built a house, ornamented with numerous statues and vases, disposed at various points [the free-standing statues and vases placed along the roof cornice]. Those who delight in profuse ornament will admire this; yet it is the judicious disposition of decoration that gives a building its beauty." But then Brice praises: "The state apartments enjoy an advantageous prospect, and the house, constructed in a relatively light manner, offers several conveniences that make the residence pleasant."

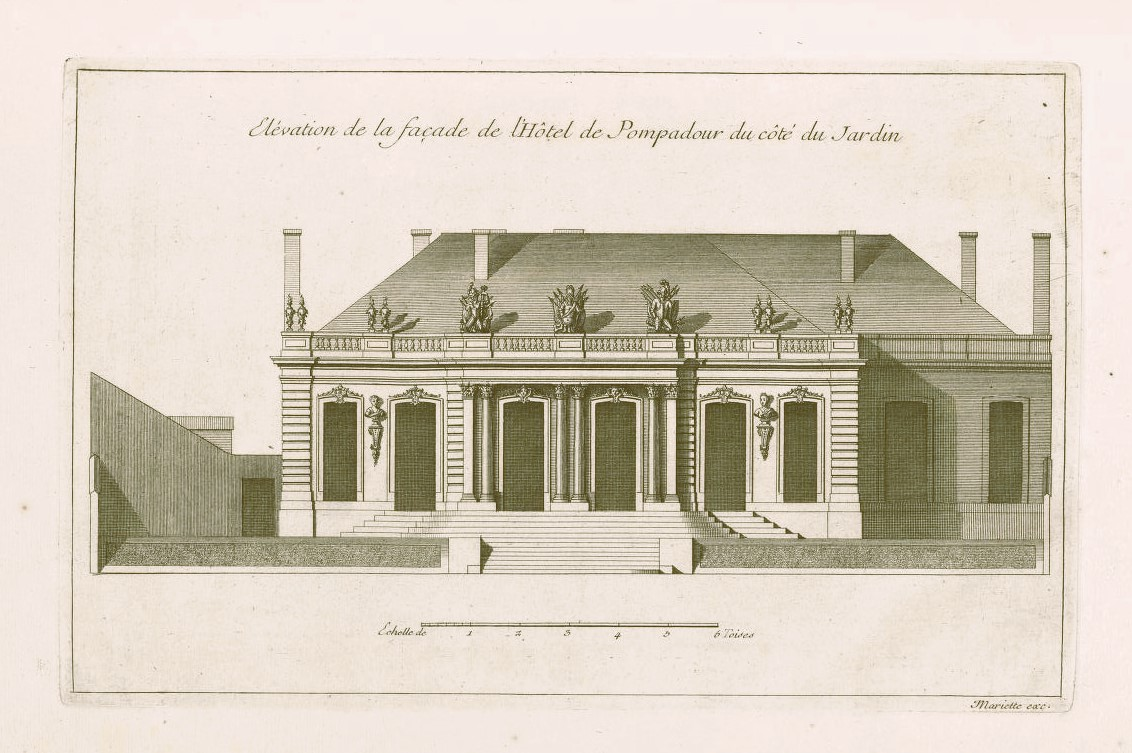
The historic façade of the corps de logis of the single-storey residence Hôtel Chanac de Pompadour, later called Hôtel de Besenval, towards the garden, according to the plans of 1704 by Pierre-Alexis Delamair (engraving published by Jean Mariette in 1727). The architectural arrangement with the free-standing statues and vases placed along the roof cornice was criticised by Germain Brice.

Although Jacques-François Blondel was not overly enthusiastic, he nevertheless found words of praise for the work of Pierre-Alexis Delamair in his 1752 publication on French architecture. In his widely acclaimed standard work Architecture Françoise (French Architecture), Blondel points out that at the Hôtel Chanac de Pompadour the kitchen is no longer housed in the corps de logis but in a side wing to the left (west wing). An architectural arrangement that Blondel describes as an innovation. This architectural innovation had two pleasant side effects: On the one hand, it kept the kitchen odors away from the state apartments and, on the other hand, it reduced the risk of fire in the corps de logis. In addition to the kitchen, Delamair also combined the other utility rooms in the west wing, such as the servant's quarters. Furthermore, Blondel praises the generally clever room layout of the house, especially of the corps de logis, which he says can be traced back to the cleverly arranged enfilades. By this he means, on the one hand, the enfilade that connects the main entrance, the vestibule and the Sallon servant de Salle à manger and ultimately leads to the garden (south to north) and, on the other hand, the enfilade that connects the three state apartments, the Sallon servant de Salle à manger, the Chambre de parade, now called the Salon de la tapisserie, and the Grand cabinet, which was converted into a dining room in 1782, (west to east). The two enfilades intersect in the Sallon servant de Salle à manger, which is now called the Salon des perroquets. Around the basse-cour – the service courtyard lying to the east of the cour d'honneur – Delamair arranged the stables, the tack room, the coach houses and the hen house.

Despite all the recognition for the architectural innovations, Blondel also expresses criticism. For him, the façade decorations are not coordinated well enough. As for the garden façade, he finds it inexplicable why Delamair chose not to create an avant-corps with three arcade windows, just as he did when remodelling the Hôtel de Soubise. Blondel criticises: "The central trumeau is intolerable. The entire façade affords ample space for an avant-corps with three arcaded windows, which would have been more suitable than the two rounded French windows now in place."

==== A scandal – or L'affaire de Mademoiselle de Choiseul ====
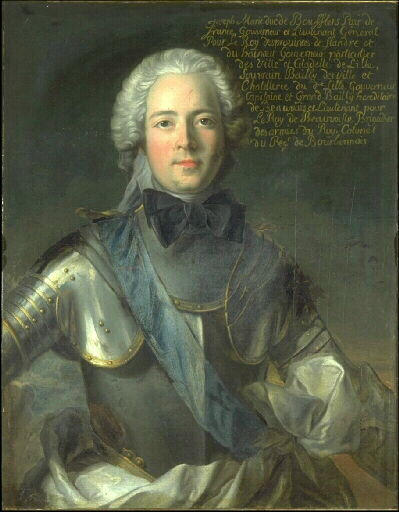
Joseph Marie de Boufflers, Duc de Boufflers et Comte de Ponches et d'Estauges, who resided with his wife Madeleine Angélique, Duchesse de Boufflers, née de Neufville de Villeroy, in the Hôtel Chanac de Pompadour in 1737 and possibly even longer. Portrait of the duc by Jean-Marc Nattier.

After the death of Abbé Pierre Hélie Chanac de Pompadour on 30 October 1710 at the Château de Rochechouart, where he was buried in the Église Saint-Sauveur de Rochechouart in the same parish, the Hôtel Chanac de Pompadour was inherited by his niece Marie Françoise Hélie de Pompadour, Marquise de Hautefort (1648–1726), and his grandniece, Marie Anne Henriette d'Espinay Saint-Luc (1673–1731), as agreed in the donation agreement of 13 March 1705. Both heiresses once lived in the Hôtel Chanac de Pompadour. However, they and later heirs also rented it out to various personalities, such as Joseph Marie de Boufflers, Duc de Boufflers et Comte de Ponches et d'Estauges.

On 20 September 1720, the Marquise de Hautefort bought the shares in the Hôtel Chanac de Pompadour that were owned by Marie Anne Henriette d'Espinay Saint-Luc, who had been married since 25 November 1715 to François, Marquis de Rochechouart and Baron du Bâtiment (1674–1742), thereby setting the estimated value of the entire property at 80,000 livres. That same year, the Marquise de Hautefort and her husband François Marie de Hautefort, Marquis de Hautefort (1654–1727), moved into the Hôtel Chanac de Pompadour. After the Marquise de Hautefort's death in 1726, the ownership situation became complicated due to an inheritance dispute between the designated heiress and the Marquise de Hautefort's family.

The inheritance dispute over the Hôtel Chanac de Pompadour attracted considerable public attention at the time, as the heiress designated by the Marquise de Hautefort, Augustine Françoise de Choiseul, was simultaneously involved in a prolonged legitimisation process to establish her biological parentage. This process concerned César Auguste de Choiseul, Duc de Choiseul et Comte de Plessis-Praslin († 1705), and his family, as well as the powerful family on her mother's side, the family de La Baume Le Blanc de La Vallière, the Ducs de La Vallière. It was one of the biggest scandals of its time and the court case – which was called L'affaire de Mademoiselle de Choiseul – was even brought before the Parlement de Paris. Augustine Françoise de Choiseul was the ward of the Marquise de Hautefort, who named her Mademoiselle de Saint-Cyr, named after the marquise's possession of Saint-Cyr-la-Roche. Finally, on 18 July 1726, she was declared daughter of Louise-Gabrielle, Duchesse de Choiseul, née de La Baume Le Blanc de La Vallière (1665–1698), and of the Duc de Choiseul. Furthermore, two years later, on 7 June 1728, it was decided by an amicable settlement that the Marquise de Hautefort's niece Marie Anne Henriette, Marquise de Rochechouart, née d'Espinay Saint-Luc (1673–1731), would inherit the Hôtel Chanac de Pompadour.

==== House of Diplomacy: The first ambassador moves in ====
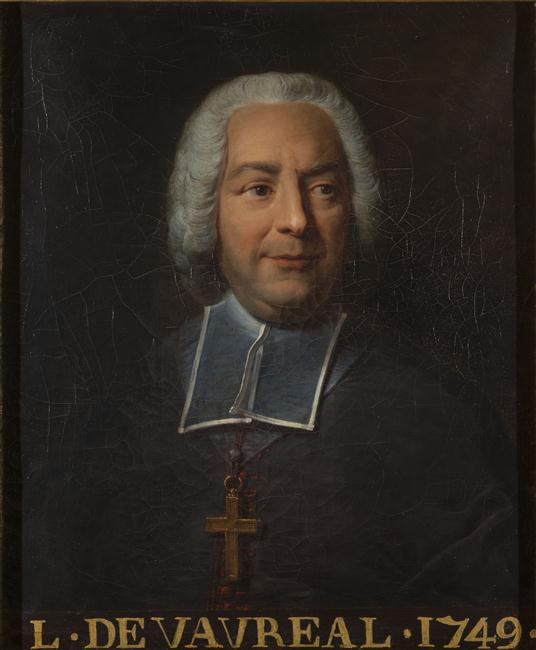
Bought the Hôtel Chanac de Pompadour in 1750: Louis-Guy de Guérapin, Baron de Vauréal et Comte de Belleval, Évêque de Rennes. While serving as French ambassador in Madrid in 1745, he was made a grandee by King Philip V. The date 1749 that appears in his portrait corresponds to that of his election to the Académie Française (seat 23), replacing the deceased Évêque de Strasbourg, Armand-Gaston-Maximilien, Prince de Rohan.

The Marquise de Rochechouart's heirs may have held the property until 1747, when they probably sold it to the widow Madeleine Angélique, Duchesse de Boufflers, née de Neufville de Villeroy, whose husband had died the same year. After marrying Charles II Frédéric de Montmorency, Duc de Piney-Luxembourg, on 29 June 1750, the Duchesse de Boufflers – now the Duchesse de Piney-Luxembourg – probably sold the Hôtel Chanac de Pompadour later that year to Louis-Guy de Guérapin, Baron de Vauréal et Comte de Belleval, the French ambassador in Madrid (1741–1749) and Évêque de Rennes (1732–1759).

However, depending on the source of information, the Duc and the Duchesse de Boufflers were also just tenants of the residence. What is certain is that the Duc and the Duchesse de Boufflers lived in the house in 1737 and that the next significant owner of the Hôtel Chanac de Pompadour was Louis-Guy de Guérapin, Baron de Vauréal et Comte de Belleval, Évêque de Rennes, who bought the residence on 3 February 1750 for 90,100 livres.

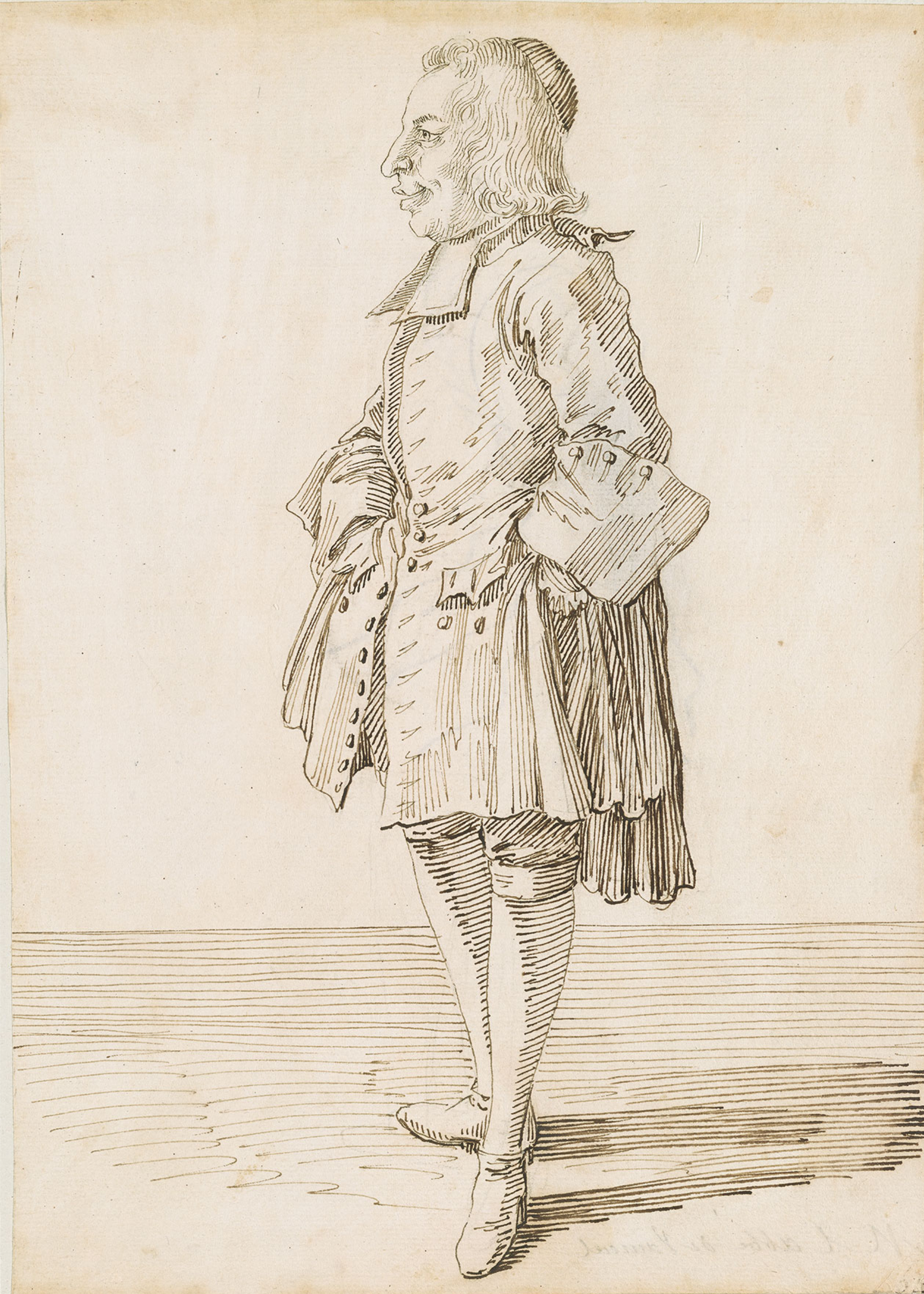
Louis-Guy de Guérapin de Vauréal, as caricatured by Pier Leone Ghezzi. His rather creative interpretation of priestly life was a gift from heaven – at least for cartoonists. Naturally, his residence on the Rue de Grenelle earned a reputation – though perhaps not the kind usually associated with religious devotion.

The évêque was a prominent figure at the royal court during the reign of King Louis XV. Amongst others, he held the position of Maître ecclésiastique de la Chapelle du Roi (Ecclesiastical Master of the King's Chapel) from 1732 until his death in 1760. The climax of his career at the royal court, however, was his tenure as French ambassador in Madrid from 1741 to 1749, undertaken under a special royal mandate of the highest political importance. On 8 March 1741 (the date of his lettres de créance), King Louis XV dispatched the évêque-ambassadeur (bishop-ambassador) to Spain, where he was received by King Philip V on 24 May 1741 at the king's summer residence, the Palacio Real de Aranjuez. In October 1743, he was instructed to initiate negotiations on a counter-alliance with Spain in response to the defensive alliance concluded at Worms on 20 September 1743 between Austria, England and Sardinia. It was in 1744, however, that he received the defining mission of his career in a personal letter from King Louis XV, sent from Strasbourg and dated 7 October 1744. The king instructed him to negotiate the marriage between his eldest son, Louis-Ferdinand de France, Dauphin de France, and María Teresa Rafaela de España, Infanta de España, thereby sealing the alliance between France and Spain – a mission he accomplished with distinction. The marriage contract was signed on 13 December 1744, and the marriage was celebrated by proxy in Madrid on 18 December 1744 and in person at the Château de Versailles on 23 February 1745.

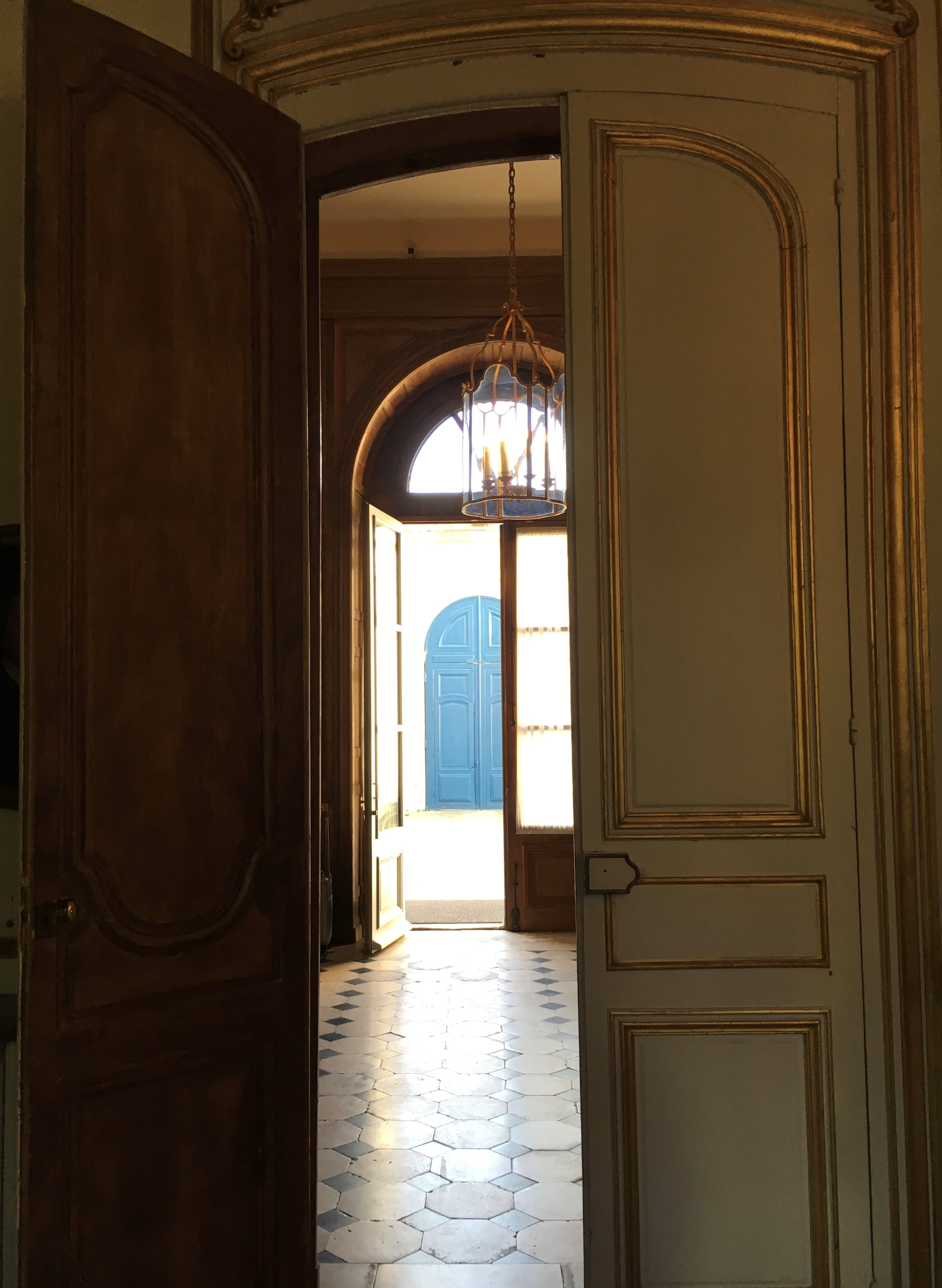
A view unchanged since 1704: The enfilade extending from the Salon des perroquets, via the vestibule, to the entrance gate of the Hôtel de Besenval. It was Louis-Guy de Guérapin de Vauréal who had the vestibule enlarged to its current size.

However, Louis-Guy de Guérapin de Vauréal also achieved prominence in another field. At the royal court, many gallant rumors were circulating about the évêque, dating back to his time as an abbé. Especially his love affair with the widow Marie Geneviève Henriette Gertrude de Poitiers, Marquise de Comblans et de Coublans, née de Bourbon-Malause (1691–1778), who was the Dame de compagnie (Lady companion) to Françoise-Marie de Bourbon, Duchesse d'Orléans, and who was considered a prude, caused amusement at court. Their amorous tête-à-tête in the spring of 1725 at the Château de Marly became famous, as it was witnessed by Louis-Armand de Bourbon, Prince de Conti, who relished spreading the story at court.

Alfred Bardet reports, based on a report by Mathieu Marais from 10 April 1725, about Louis-Guy de Guérapin de Vauréal's career in the Catholic Church:

"The Abbé de Vauréal was the most handsome man at court in the Régence and in the early years of the reign of King Louis XV. He was amiable, witty, daring and full of intrigue. He owed, however, the episcopate to women."

— Alfred Bardet (1846–1912), Membre associé de la Société Académique de l'Aube et Juge de Paix du Canton de Brienne

The évêque lived in his residence on the Rue de Grenelle for ten years. During this time, he made several mostly minor modifications to the building. One of the more substantial and lasting changes he initiated was the enlargement of the vestibule to the size still visible today.

It was on 17 June 1760, on the return journey from Vichy, in the village of Magny-Cours, that Louis-Guy de Guérapin, Baron de Vauréal et Comte de Belleval, suddenly died. According to Jaime Masones de Lima, the Spanish ambassador in Paris, the évèque died as a rich man. His legacy was estimated at over two million livres, consisting mostly of real estate, dominions and lands. He bequeathed his fortune primarily to his servants and to a few individuals.

=== Pierre Victor, Baron de Besenval de Brunstatt: Soldier, esthete, seducer ===
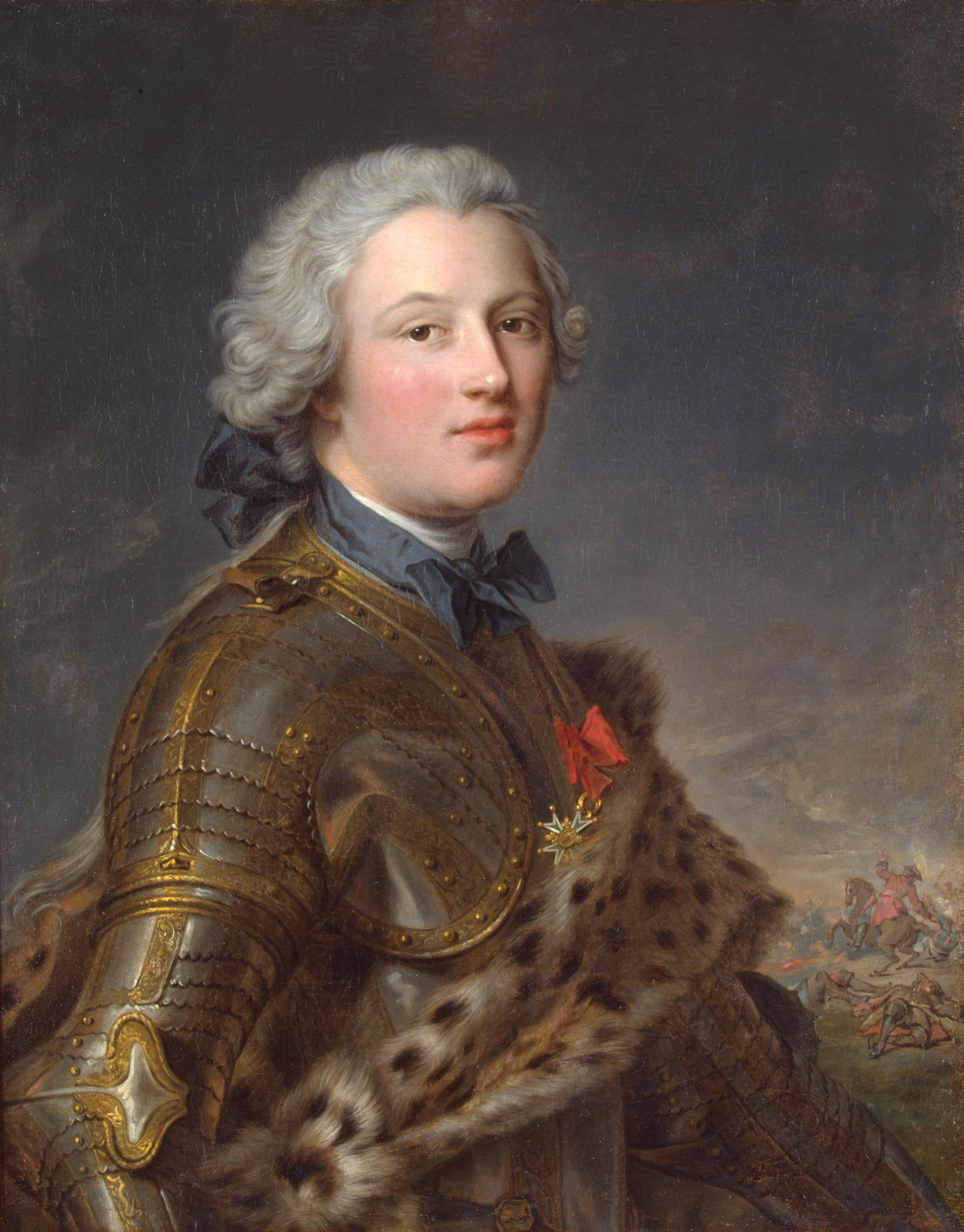
Pierre Victor, Baron de Besenval de Brunstatt, in armour, portrayed by Jean-Marc Nattier in 1766, after having received the Order of Saint Louis. Today, this portrait is part of the collections of the Hermitage Museum (transferred to the museum from the Antikvariat in 1934).

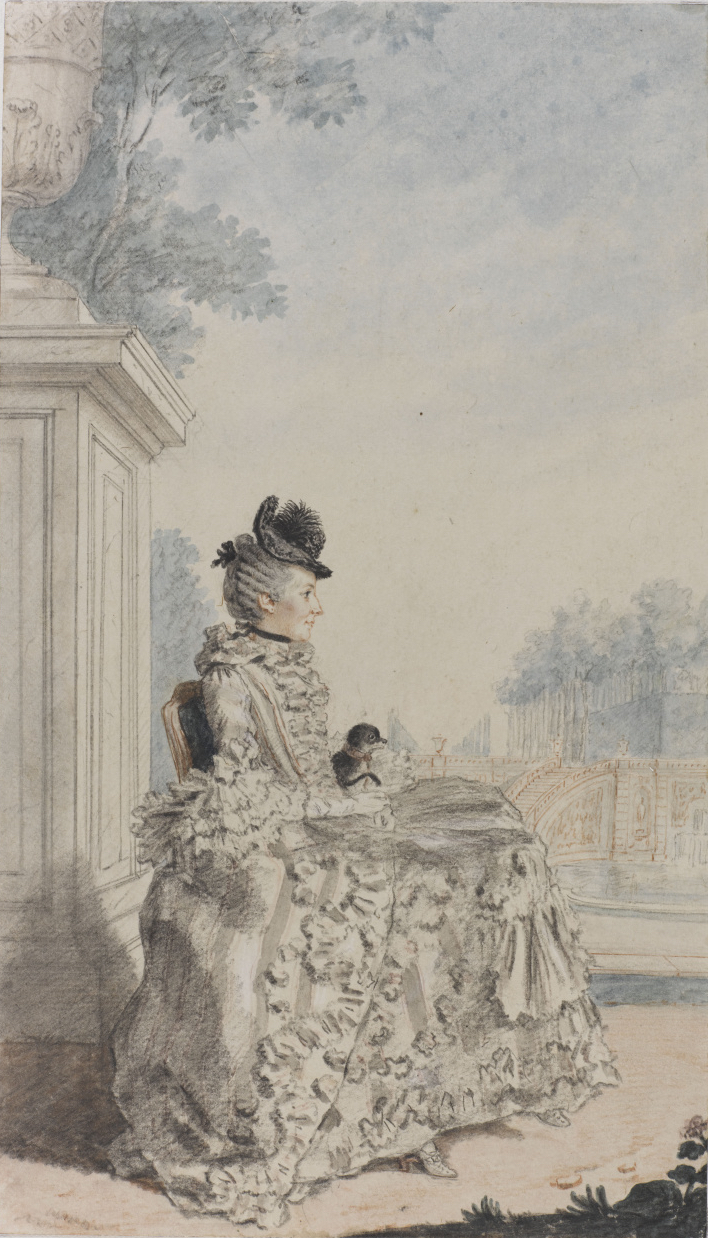
Louise-Anne-Madeleine, Marquise de Ségur, née de Vernon (1729–1778), wife of Maréchal Philippe Henri, Marquis de Ségur. The Marquise de Ségur was Pierre Victor de Besenval's favorite mistress and the mother of his only child. At the same time, the Marquis de Ségur was Besenval's military comrade and his best friend. Portrayed by Louis Carrogis Carmontelle in 1763.

After the death of Louis-Guy de Guérapin, Baron de Vauréal et Comte de Belleval, the Hôtel Chanac de Pompadour was rented out first to Charles Léonard de Baylens, Marquis de Poyanne, de Castelnau et de Vandenesse, for an annual rent of 8,500 livres, and then, from 12 September 1766, to Pierre Victor, Baron de Besenval de Brunstatt, a Swiss military officer in French service, whose name the residence still bears today.

==== Laughter, the Graces and the Games: The Soul of the Hôtel de Besenval ====
When Pierre Victor de Besenval's friend Jean-Baptiste du Tertre, Marquis de Sancé (1730–1790/1791 or around 1793), learned that the baron had moved from the nearby Rue de Bourgogne to the infamous residence of the notorious womaniser Louis-Guy de Guérapin, Baron de Vauréal et Comte de Belleval – who had become the Évêque de Rennes in 1732 – he was amused and sent him the following satirical poem, pointing out the baron's equally well-known reputation as a womaniser and seducer, as well as that of his new residence as a former love nest of a prélat. This is the only poem ever written about Pierre Victor, Baron de Besenval, and his residence, the Hôtel de Besenval:

Près la barrière de Grenelle,
Un prélat par dévotion,
D'une manière agréable et nouvelle,
Avait embelli sa maison;

Mais las ! sur quoi fonder la vanité mondaine !
L'ouvrage finissait à peine,
Quand un sort barbare et cruel,
Appelle le prélat au sein de l'Éternel;

L'Amour le voyant mort, dit :
« Bon, ceci faisait un endroit de délice,
À mes mystères tout propices,
J'y veux loger un baron suisse,
Il y célébrera mon nom »;

« Holà, les Ris, les Grâces et les Jeux,
Amenez Besenval, et sans plus de remise,
Installez-le de votre mieux,
Au lit d'un père de l'église. »

— Jean-Baptiste du Tertre, Marquis de Sancé (27 ou 29 mai 1730 à Château-Gontier – 1790/1791 ou vers 1793), Mestre de camp de dragons, Brigadier, Maréchal de camp, Chevalier de Saint-Louis, et Syndic de la Compagnie française des Indes orientales (1764–1768)

==== From tenant to owner – or from the Hôtel Chanac de Pompadour to the Hôtel de Besenval ====
It was on 5 December 1767, that Pierre Victor, Baron de Besenval de Brunstatt, bought the Hôtel Chanac de Pompadour at auction from the many heirs of Louis-Guy de Guérapin, Baron de Vauréal et Comte de Belleval, for 170,100 livres, of which 6,000 livres for the furniture. The baron, who mainly grew up in France and who was very close to King Louis XV, and later to King Louis XVI and especially Queen Marie-Antoinette, was a descendant of one of the richest and most powerful patrician families of Solothurn. Among other holdings, the family called the Palais Besenval and the Schloss Waldegg their own; the latter was also the birthplace of Pierre Victor de Besenval on 14 October 1721.

The Hôtel Chanac de Pompadour has seen many changes of ownership over its more than 300-year history. And the building has changed its name just as often. However, the residence is still best known today by the names of its commissioner, Abbé Pierre Hélie Chanac de Pompadour, and its most illustrious owner, Pierre Victor, Baron de Besenval de Brunstatt.

==== House of Besenval: A Swiss family, well connected – the French and the Polish connections ====
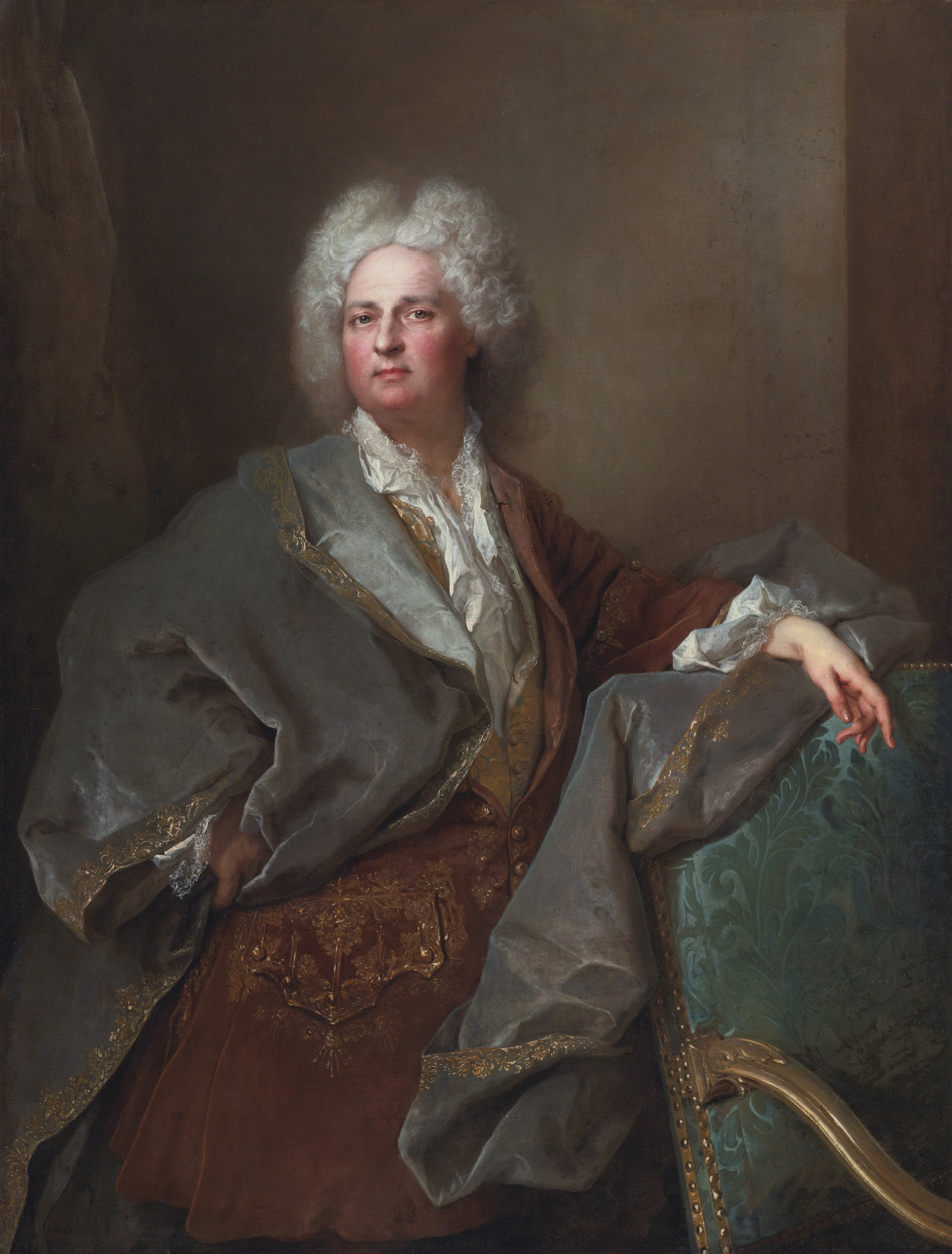
Pierre Victor's father: Jean Victor, Baron de Besenval de Brunstatt, a Swiss military officer, politician and diplomate in French service. He served as French envoy to the northern courts, with a primary focus on Saxony–Poland and broader diplomatic responsibilities across northern and eastern Europe during the Great Northern War – a notable role for a Swiss-born diplomat in French service. He enjoyed the confidence of both: King Louis XIV and Philippe II de Bourbon, Duc d'Orléans et Régent de France (1715–1723). Portrayed by Nicolas de Largillière in 1720.

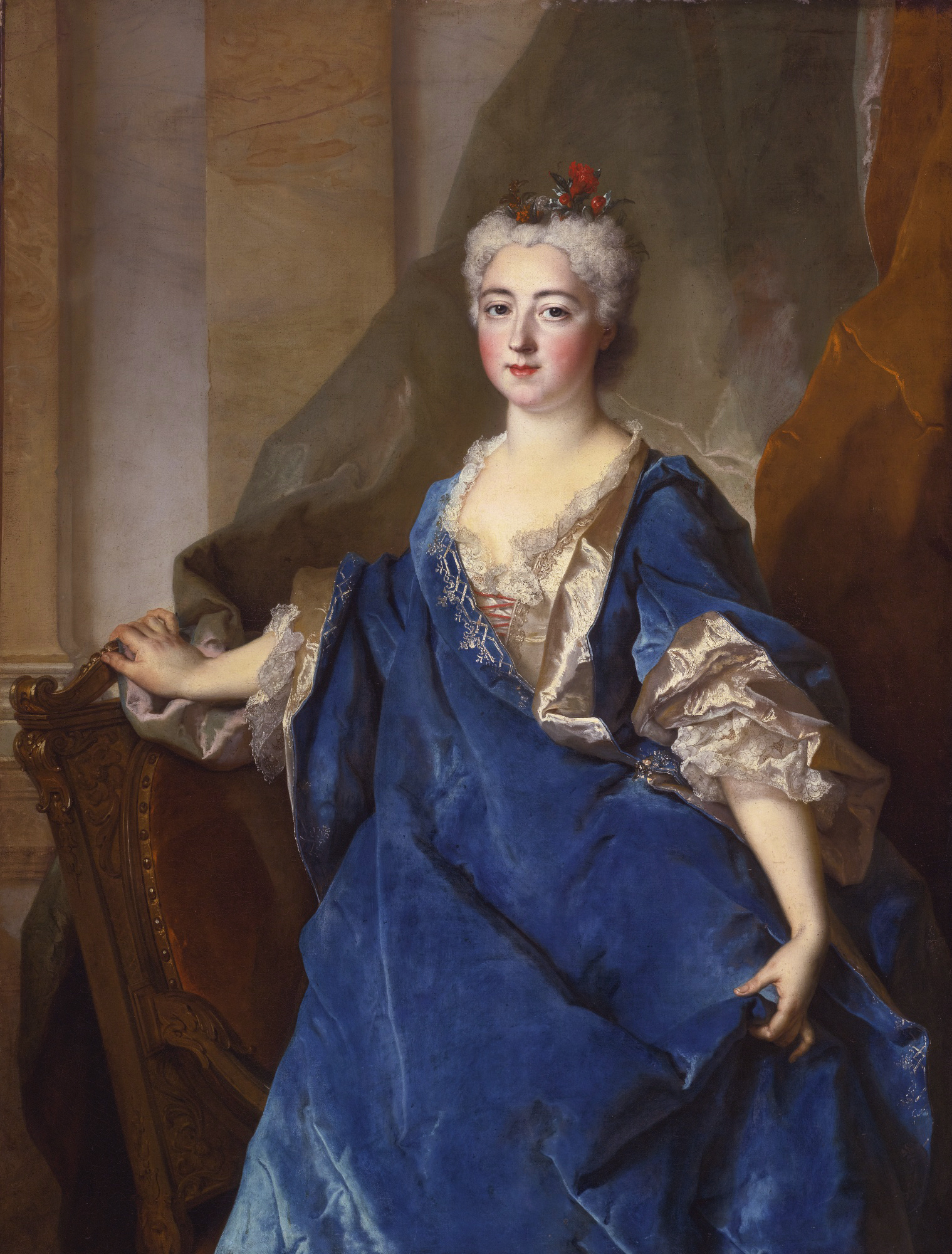
Paved the way for her son's French career: Katarzyna, Baronne de Besenval de Brunstatt, née Bielińska (1684–1761), Pierre Victor's mother. While Voltaire acknowledged in her both wit and modesty, Jean-Jacques Rousseau deemed her stubborn and excessively conceited. Rousseau felt insulted by the Baronne de Besenval and remarked: "The only person who received me with ill grace, and from whom I had least reason to expect such injustice, was Madame de Besenval." Portrayed by Nicolas de Largillière in 1720.

The family de Besenval, or von Besenval as they were called in their hometown of Solothurn, had long and close ties to the French royal family, the House of Bourbon, also thanks to their family ties to the highest circles in Poland. The family became rich through the salt trade and the mercenary business with France.

Pierre Victor, Baron de Besenval de Brunstatt, was the son of Jean Victor, Baron de Besenval de Brunstatt, who was a colonel in the Regiment of Swiss Guards of France. Jean Victor de Besenval was a descendant of a family originally from Torgnon in the Aosta Valley, which had risen socially in the service of King Louis XIV and had received the title of baron (Reichsfreiherr) of the Holy Roman Empire from Emperor Leopold I in 1695. Furthermore, already in February 1655, Martin de Besenval (1600–1660), Jean Victor's grandfather, was ennobled by King Louis XIV and raised to knighthood in 1658 in recognition of his service to the French Crown. The letters of nobility also extended to his descendants.

Pierre Victor's mother was Katarzyna Bielińska (1684–1761). She was the daughter of Kazimierz Ludwik Bieliński, a Polish noble, politician and diplomat. She was also the sister of Franciszek Bieliński. Both, her father and her brother, were Grand Marshals of The Crown in Poland under the reign of King Stanisław Leszczyński, where Pierre Victor's father had served twice as French envoy. First under King Stanisław Leszczyński, from 1707 to 1709, and then under King Augustus II the Strong, from 1713 to 1721. Jean Victor de Besenval's closest ally at the court of King Augustus II the Strong was Maria Magdalena Bielińska, div. Gräfin von Dönhoff, the king's Maîtresse-en-titre, who became his sister-in-law and thus the aunt of Pierre Victor de Besenval. Katarzyna Bielińska's first marriage was to Jakub Potocki, a Polish noble, who died in 1715. On 18 September 1716, she married Jean Victor, Baron de Besenval, whereupon she became the Baronne de Besenval. A marriage warmly welcomed by Philippe II de Bourbon, Duc d'Orléans, who served as Régent de France between 1715 and 1723. Katarzyna, Baronne de Besenval, née Bielińska, became almost overnight an important figure at the royal court of France when, on 15 August 1725, King Louis XV married Marie Leszczyńska, her cousin, at least that's the rumour that's been spread. A rumour that the Baronne de Besenval never denied.

However, in September 1725, Voltaire wrote from the Château de Versailles to Madame La Présidente de Bernières, Marguerite-Madeleine du Maignart, Marquise de Bernières, née du Moustier (1698–1767), Châtelaine of the Château de la Rivière-Bourdet: "All here pay their court to Madame de Besenval, who is in some manner related to the queen. This lady, possessed of spirit, receives with the utmost modesty the homage lavished upon her. I saw her yesterday in the company of the Maréchal de Villars. When asked in what manner she was related to the queen, she replied with wit that queens have no relatives."

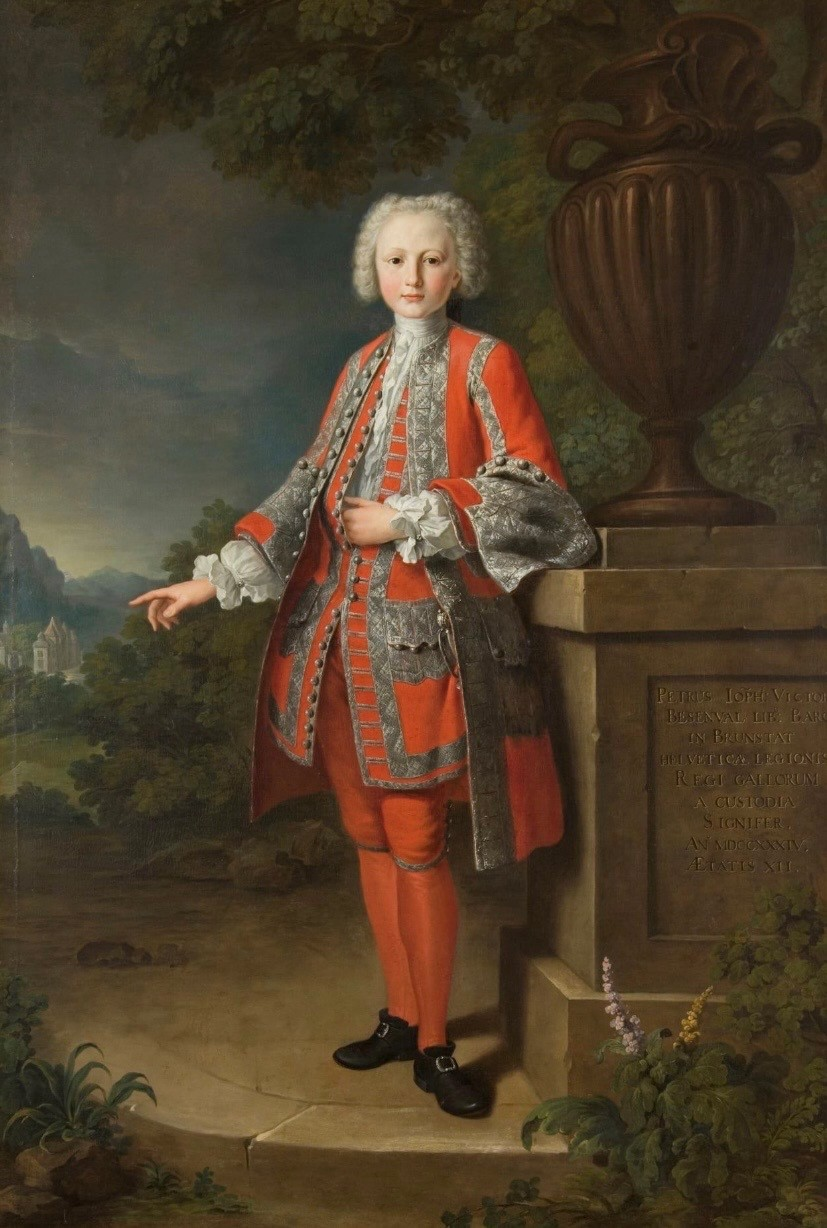
Pierre Victor de Besenval as Ensign of the Swiss Guards Regiment, portrayed by Alexis Simon Belle in 1734 at the age of twelve. He points towards the family estate in Switzerland, the Schloss Waldegg.

This somewhat enigmatic answer from the Baronne de Besenval, however, left room for speculation about the true degree of her kinship with the queen.

The rumor about the kinship with the Queen of France probably arose because the first husband of the Baronne de Besenval's sister Maria Magdalena, Gräfin von Dönhoff, née Bielińska, was Bogislaus Ernestus, Graf von Dönhoff († 24 March 1734), a member of the eastern Prussian line of the family von Dönhoff, also known as Denhoff. Bogislaus Ernestus, Graf von Dönhoff, was a second-degree cousin of King Stanisław Leszczyński and therefore a third-degree uncle of the Queen of France. Katarzyna, Baronne de Besenval, née Bielińska, was only related to Bogislaus Ernestus, Graf von Dönhoff, through her sister's marriage.

Although there was obviously no direct blood kinship with the family of the Queen of France, relations between the families Bieliński and Leszczyński were nonetheless excellent. Following the royal wedding in 1725, the influence of the family de Besenval at the royal court grew considerably. A striking illustration of this is the elevation of the family de Besenval's Alsatian possession of Brunstatt to a French barony by the King of France on 11 August 1726, from which the family derived the title Baron de Besenval de Brunstatt. The two other possessions of the family de Besenval in the Alsace were Riedisheim and Didenheim.

==== Following in his father's footsteps ====
As a child, Pierre Victor de Besenval lived with his two uncles and further family members in Solothurn in the Palais Besenval and the family's country estate, the Schloss Waldegg. In 1726, when he was five years old, his mother brought him to France, where his parents already lived. The family lived in a hôtel particulier on the Rue de Varenne in Paris. But they also had an apartment near the Château de Versailles. A few years later, on 4 April 1731, at the age of nine, Pierre Victor joined the Regiment of Swiss Guards as a cadet, of which his father had become colonel. On 28 January 1733, he was promoted to ensign. After his father's death in 1736, the fifteen-year-old Pierre Victor de Besenval inherited the Company de Besenval of the Swiss Guards Regiment, of which he became the Commandant on 13 April 1738. Less than ten years later, he was promoted to brigadier on 25 March 1747.

=== Extravagance on a grand scale: The nymphaeum ===
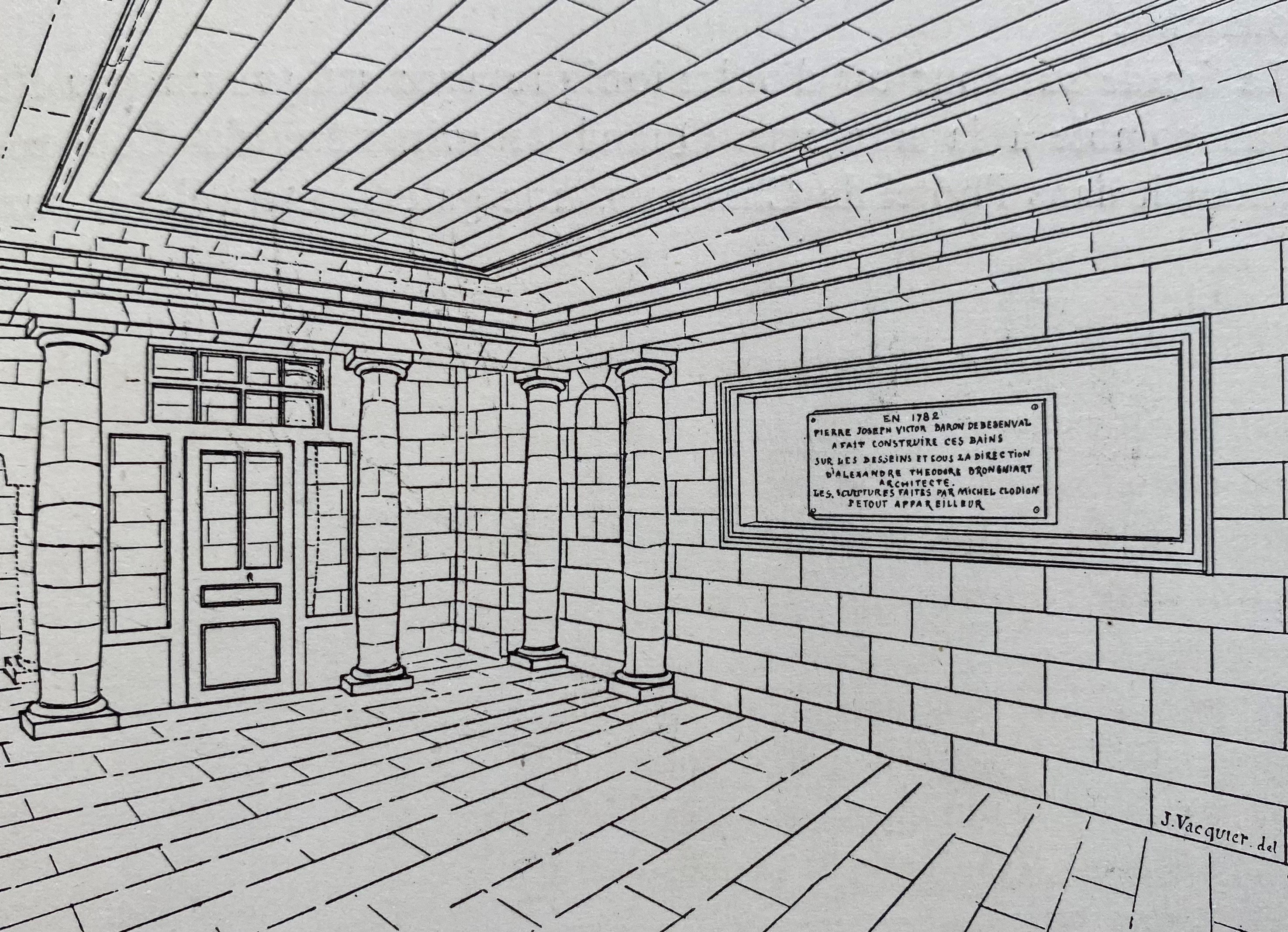
The nymphaeum as it appeared at the end of the 19th century (the visible door is not original). The original double-leaf entrance door was on the opposite side (east side, not visible). All decorative elements were removed in 1822. The symmetry of the rectangular room was emphasised by the four niches in the corners with vases by Claude Michel. In addition, there was also a relief by Claude Michel on either side of the pool, the north and south walls (in this drawing already replaced by the baron's relocated commemorative plaque). Two original by Claude Michel signed rectangular terracotta preparatory reliefs for the decoration of the baron's nymphaeum were rediscovered and sold by Christie's in New York on 20 October 2022 as lot 35 in the sale The Ann & Gordon Getty Collection for US$ 252,000. One depicting Venus and Cupid, (Salmacis and Hermaphroditus) and Leda and the Swan, the other depicting the Bath of Venus (the latter was eventually replaced by a different design; alternatively, this third relief may never have been executed or may have been lost over time). The lot was bought by Daniel Katz Ltd of London.

At the beginning of the 1780s, during the reign of King Louis XVI and his wife, Queen Marie-Antoinette, the art-loving Baron de Besenval could already reflect on a distinguished military career. After being appointed Lieutenant-Général of the King's Armies on 25 July 1762 on the recommendation of Étienne-François de Choiseul-Beaupré-Stainville, Duc de Choiseul, he was appointed Gouverneur militaire of Haguenau in 1766 and Lieutenant-Colonel of the Swiss Guards Regiment on 25 August 1767. Furthermore, on 24 September 1781, he was promoted to the rank of Commandant en chef of the troops and garrisons in the interior of France. As such, all troops and garrisons within France were subordinate to him with the exception of the city of Paris. This specifically included the following provinces: Île-de-France (without Paris), Soissonnais, Berry, Bourbonnais, Orléanais, Nivernais, Touraine and Maine. The security of the city of Paris was ensured by the city's regular Guard Troops and the Guards of the Parlement de Paris. In addition, following unrest in 1788, companies of both the French Guards and the Swiss Guards were deployed in Paris in support of public order.

Pierre Victor de Besenval wished that his residence would reflect his achievements and his status. It was therefore only consequent that, in 1782, he employed the celebrated architect Alexandre-Théodore Brongniart to enlarge and transform his residence on the Rue de Grenelle. Among Brongniart's additions were a long, skylit gallery for the baron's constantly growing art collection and a dining room. He also replaced the small annexe on the east side of the garden façade – dating from the time of Louis-Guy de Guérapin, Baron de Vauréal et Comte de Belleval, Évêque de Rennes, (whose former Cabinet chinois it housed) – with a larger annexe, which now contains the ambassador's library. Brongniart also introduced a unique extravagance: A nymphaeum – a private bath with an elliptical pool in the antique style.

==== Only the best will do: An esthete and his connections to the world of fine arts ====
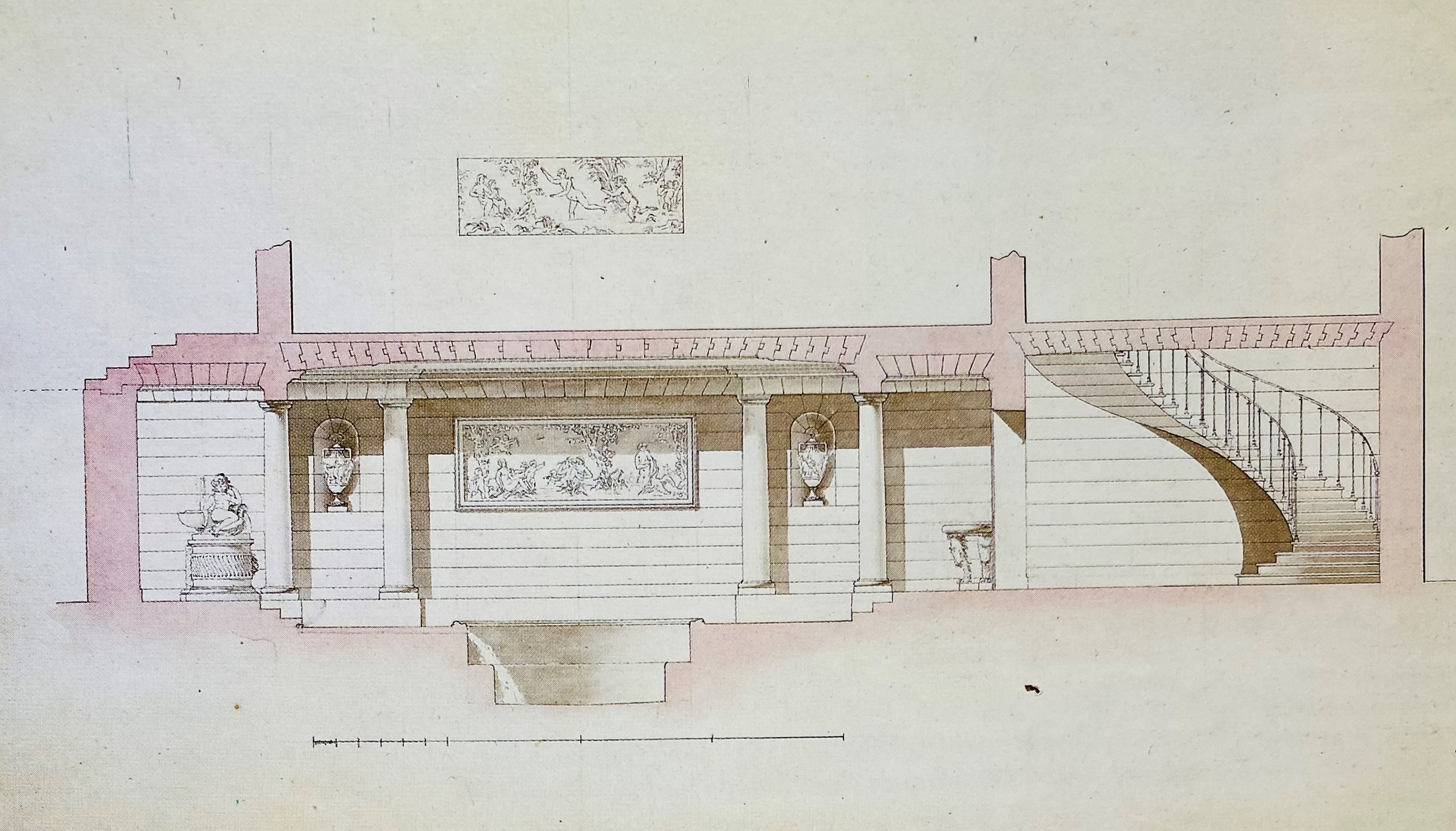
Cutaway drawing showing the nymphaeum in 1782, as designed by Alexandre-Théodore Brongniart and artistically decorated by Claude Michel. On the wall, between the two niches with the vases, one of the two large reliefs, made from Pierre de Tonnerre, by Claude Michel, depicting Venus and Cupid, (Salmacis and Hermaphroditus) and Leda and the Swan. The second one, on the opposite side, depicting Pan pursuing Syrinx under de gaze of Cupid (as can be seen separately above the drawing). On the far left: The now considered lost larger-than-life naiad, called La Source, on her oval-shaped pedestal. The console table with paw feet (one of a pair) visible in this cutaway drawing is still at the Château de Digoine. In addition to the nymphaeum itself, contemporaries were also impressed by the floating staircase that led there. This staircase was lost over time during the various structural alteration works.

Thanks to his contacts with his friends at the Académie royale de peinture et de sculpture – of which he was named an Honoraire Amateur on 7 February 1784, replacing Abbé François-Emmanuel Pommyer (1713–1784) – the Baron de Besenval surrounded himself with quality French art works, signed by Le Nain, Charles-André van Loo, Pierre Mignard, Jean-Baptiste Greuze, Antoine Watteau, Jean-Marc Nattier and Henri-Pierre Danloux just to name a few. The baron also owned a version of La Gimblette (girl playing with a dog) by Jean-Honoré Fragonard. This painting hung in the adjoining room of his bedroom, now called the Salon de l'alcôve or Le Boudoir. It was said that the baron owned the original version of La Gimblette. It is very likely that the baron bought La Gimblette from Jean-Baptiste-Pierre Lebrun. Today, the painting is considered lost. However, there is an engraving based on the original painting, executed by Charles Bertony in 1783 and with a dedication to the Baron de Besenval, showing an inscription with the baron's titles, awards and military ranks as well as the family coat of arms.

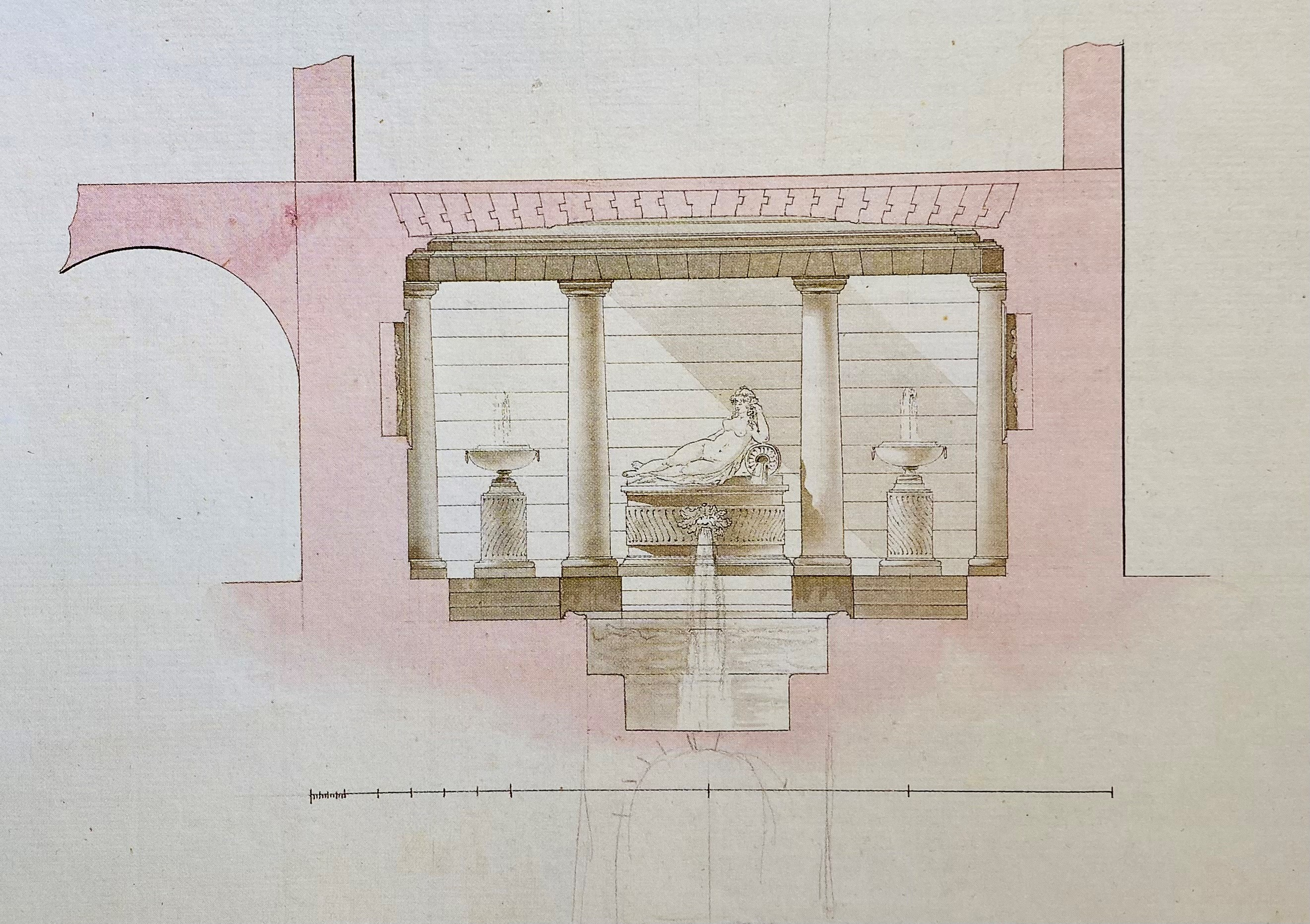
Detail of Brongniart's plan for the nymphaeum with the now considered lost larger-than-life naiad, called La Source, on her oval-shaped pedestal, showing the gargoyle in the form of a bronze mascaron.

It was also thanks to his contacts with the academy – established long before his appointment as an Honoraire Amateur – and to the support of Alexandre-Théodore Brongniart that the baron managed to persuade the celebrated sculptor Claude Michel to decorate his nymphaeum. Brongniart knew Michel very well, as the two had worked together previously.

Amongst others, Claude Michel created four vases with relief decoration, each measuring 1.07 m and showing dancing satyrs, and two large reliefs with erotic scenes, each measuring 3.23 m x 1.03 m. All these decorative elements later formed part of the interior decoration of the entrance hall of the Château de Digoine in Palinges. The vases and the reliefs have been part of the collections of the Louvre since 1986 and 1987, respectively (today, plaster replicas of the reliefs can be seen in the entrance hall of the Château de Digoine). The staircase of the nymphaeum was also decorated with a relief, described by Luc-Vincent Thiéry in 1787 as Women in the bath. This relief almost certainly corresponds to the relief still kept at the Château de Digoine, known as the Toilette of Venus. However, this relief is not attributed to Claude Michel. It is also not shown on Brogniart's very detailed design drawings. The Château de Digoine and the Hôtel de Besenval were simultaneously owned by the family de Moreton de Chabrillan and their descendants for over 100 years.

"The staircase, distinguished by the precision of its steps, is carved from the very stone, and seems to float in the air, upheld by no visible support."

— Luc-Vincent Thiéry on the architectural masterpiece of the nymphaeum staircase

==== A masterpiece on everyone's lips: The top topic of conversation at the Société de la Reine ====
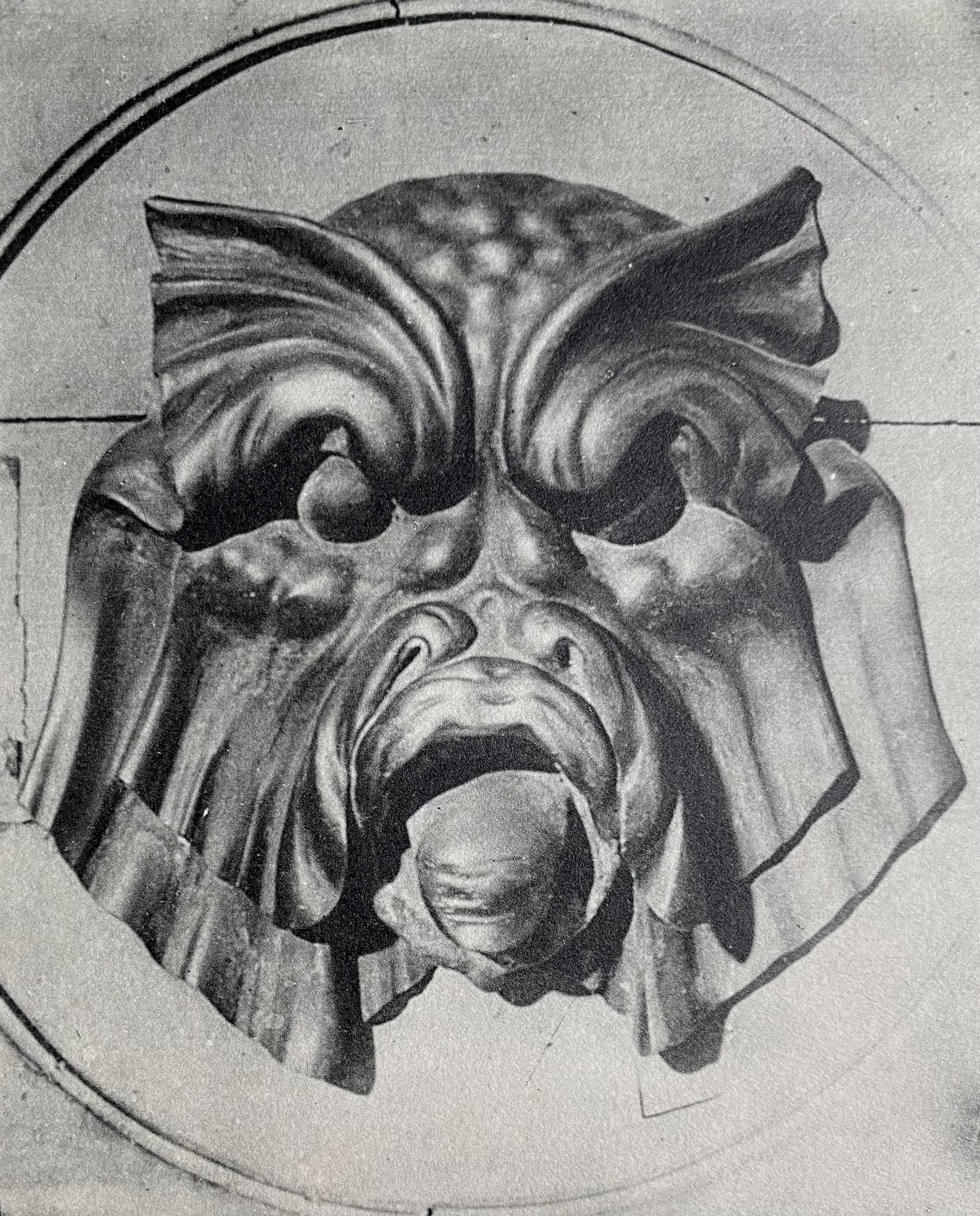
One of a pair of bronze mascarons on the double-leaf entrance door of the nymphaeum, as described by Luc-Vincent Thiéry in 1787. Photographed around 1910. This door had already been removed when the Swiss Confederation bought the Hôtel de Besenval in 1938. As part of the restoration work in 2024, a double-leaf door was reinstalled.

The nymphaeum with its suggestive decoration became very popular with the Parisian high society. Almost immediately, rumors of scandalous behavior in the nymphaeum spread throughout the salons and this only confirmed the baron's reputation as a lover and seducer. His contemporaries described the baron as extremely handsome, cheerful and witty. As a personality who is very popular with the ladies, loves life and always sees things positively. Qualities that ultimately enabled him to be accepted into the private circle of the Société de la Reine (the Queen's Society). In her memoirs Caroline-Stéphanie-Félicité du Crest, Comtesse de Genlis, recalls: "Le Baron de Besenval avait encore une figure charmante et de grands succès auprès les dames" (the Baron de Besenval retained a most charming air, and met with great success among the ladies).

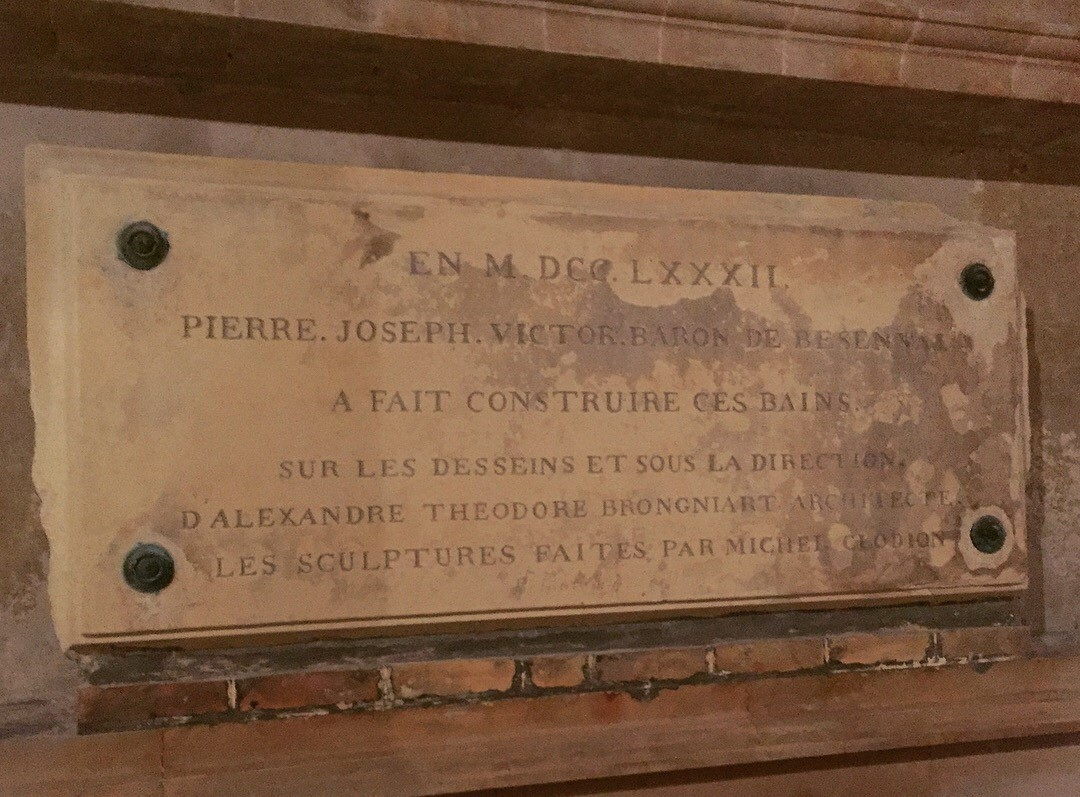
The commemorative plaque for the nymphaeum was commissioned by the Baron de Besenval himself.

The Société de la Reine, a very influential circle in the royal court, was also called the Société de Trianon, named after its meeting place, the Petit Trianon, Queen Marie-Antoinette's retreat. In addition to the queen, the following three gentlemen were considered the most influential members of this society: Pierre Victor, Baron de Besenval de Brunstatt; Joseph Hyacinthe François de Paule de Rigaud, Comte de Vaudreuil; and Jean-Balthazar d'Adhémar de Montfalcon, Comte d'Adhémar.

After his visit to the Hôtel de Besenval in 1786, Luc-Vincent Thiéry commented approvingly on the works of Alexandre-Théodore Brongniart and Claude Michel. In his guide on the city of Paris, he enthusiastically points out the baron's extravagance: "A bath, decorated in the antique fashion and suffused with a mystical light." Thiéry refers to Brongniart's vestibule, which Brongniart designed as an anteroom to the nymphaeum and illuminated it with a skylight. Thiéry's enthusiasm for this innovation is expressed in his commentary: "It attests, beyond all doubt, to the genius of the architect." Then he goes on: "In the niches stand vases by M. Clodion, the king's sculptor, adorned with delicate reliefs; and the two large reliefs which grace the centre of this magnificent bathing apartment are likewise the noble work of that celebrated artist."

==== The legend, La Source and the remains of the nymphaeum ====
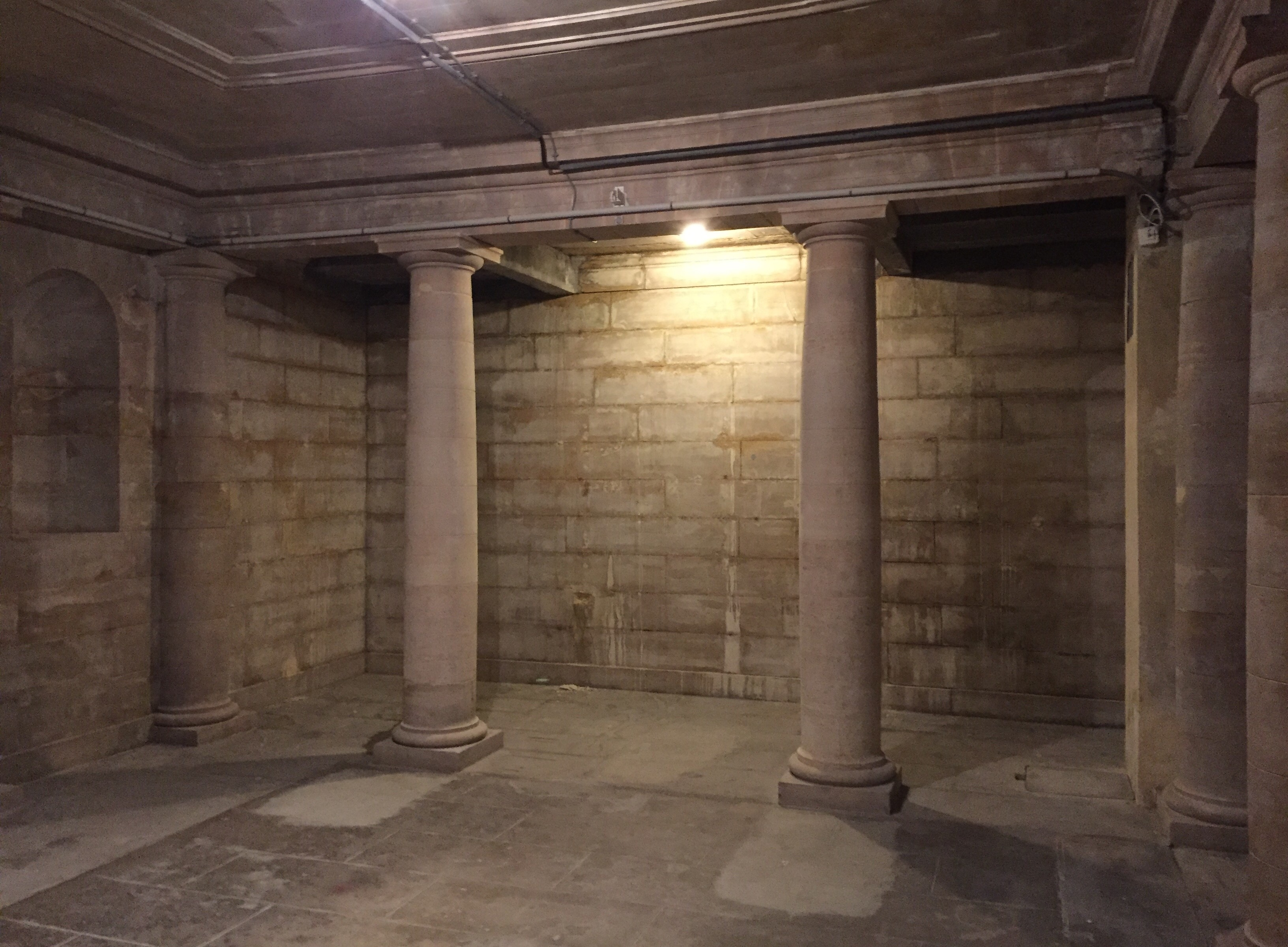
The remains of the nymphaeum in the basement of the Hôtel de Besenval as seen in 2018 (measurements of the surface area: 13.00 m x 6.00 m). The slightly different colours of the floor plates still indicate the location of the former pool. The elliptical pool was 3.50 meters in diameter and was surrounded by 12 columns in the Tuscan order, four of which were free-standing. The wall and ceiling panelling, the columns, the sculptures and the furniture were all made from Pierre de Tonnerre.

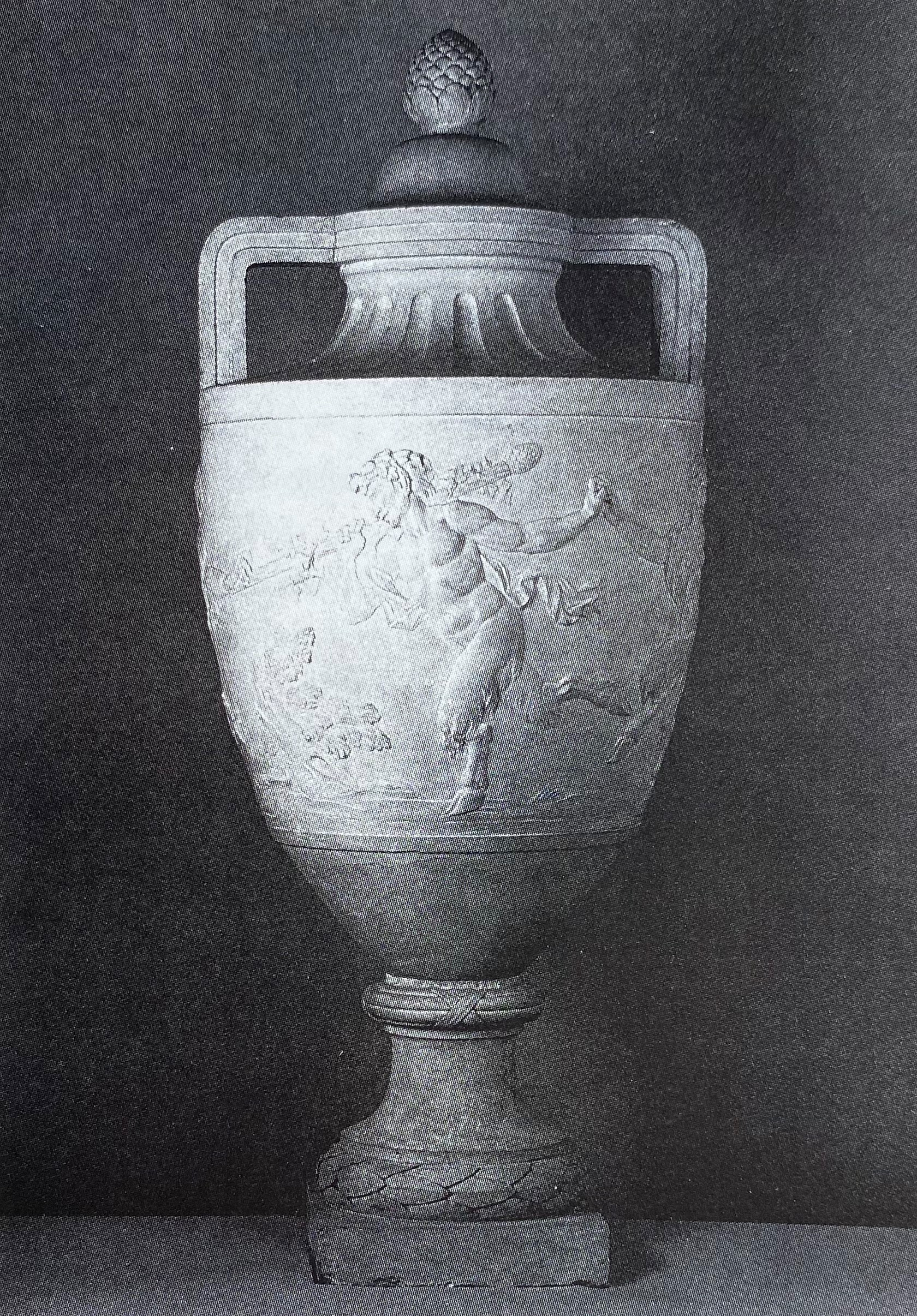
One of the four vases (height: 1.07 m) with dancing satyrs made by Claude Michel for the niches of the nymphaeum. The four vases were exhibited three times in different residences: First in the Hôtel de Besenval, then in the Château de Digoine and then in the Hôtel de Sourdeval-Demachy, also called Hôtel de Wendel after its former owner Maurice de Wendel. Since 1986, all four vases have been part of the collections of the Louvre.

Contemporary observers already noted that, although the pool was filled with hot water, the basement itself was ice cold. Therefore, the nymphaeum was likely used only to a limited extent as a setting for amorous encounters. It was also said that the pool was used only once, by a soldier of the Swiss Guards who died of pneumonia shortly afterwards. However, this may just be a popular legend, as Borgniart also installed a heating system in the nymphaeum. Nonetheless, we don't know how efficient the heating system was. What we do know is that humidity was a problem and that it damaged the stones. Anne Louise Brongniart, née Degrémont (1744–1829), already reported about this in a letter dated 3 September 1793 to her husband, Alexandre-Théodore Brongniart, after her visit to the Hôtel de Besenval.

In 1787, Luc-Vincent Thiéry confirmed in his guide on the city of Paris that there was running hot water and thus a heating system in the nymphaeum. He reports: "A larger-than-life naiad, reclining upon her urn, is placed between the free-standing columns upon an oval pedestal; a large bronze mascaron, fitted to it, supplies the pool with both hot and cold water." The naiad, called La Source, was also made by Claude Michel and was apparently signed and dated 1783. The sculpture, made from Pierre de Tonnerre – a Kimmeridgian limestone quarried in the Armançon valley east of the town of Tonnerre – later became part of the collection of Edmond James, Baron de Rothschild, who had purchased it before World War I from a Paris-based art dealer named Monsieur Guiraud. The Baron de Rothschild had the sculpture brought to his château, the Château d'Armainvilliers. In the early 1920s, the baron gave the sculpture to his son Maurice Edmond, Baron de Rothschild. There is evidence that La Source was brought to another family estate, the Château Rothschild, shortly before the outbreak of World War II. However, the Château Rothschild was looted during the war, and all trace of the sculpture has since vanished. To this day, persistent rumors persist that the Nazis seized it and carried it off to Germany. It is unusual and perhaps unique that Claude Michel worked with Pierre de Tonnerre, which was likely at Alexandre-Théodore Brongniart's request. Claude Michel preferred to create his works in stucco or terracotta. The popularity of the sculpture led Claude Michel to produce scaled-down reproductions of La Source. Even after his death, further reduced versions were created – especially in marble and bronze – by various artists.

Today, only the basic architectural structure of the nymphaeum remains visible, as the pool was filled in long ago. The mobile decorations, mostly made by Claude Michel, such as the reliefs, the vases and the statues, were all taken from the Hôtel de Besenval in the first half of the 19th century and installed in the Château de Digoine and finally sold at the beginning of the 20th century when the Château de Digoine was sold in 1908 by the descendants of the family de Moreton de Chabrillan to Anne Marie Christine Antoinette, Marquise de Croix d'Heuchin (1860–1927). The Marquise de Croix d'Heuchin bought the château for her son, Pierre Guy Marie François de Croix (1886–1930). Since 2012, Jean-Louis Remilleux has been the owner of the Château de Digoine. In interviews he repeatedly points out the connection to the Hôtel de Besenval.

"But there is one thing which has given me the greatest pleasure: the bathing apartment. My friend, it is one of your works that will confer upon you the highest honour. They possess the character of the antique. The stones bear the marks of time and humidity, lending them a character most suited to the premises."

— Anne Louise Brongniart, née Degrémont (1744–1829), on the beauty of the nymphaeum in a letter dated 3 September 1793 to her husband, Alexandre-Théodore Brongniart, who was in Bordeaux at the time, after she had visited the Hôtel de Besenval a few days earlier with her daughter, Emilie Louise Alexandrine (1780–1847), and had lunch there with Jean-Baptiste-Denis Després, the baron's former secretary and friend

=== Revolutionary years ===
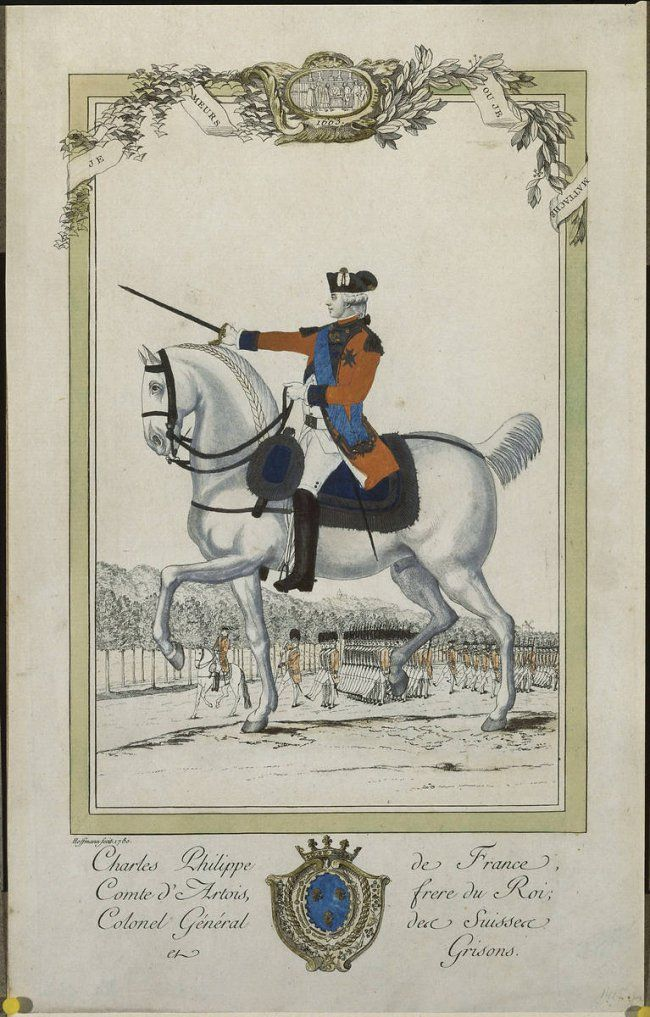
Charles-Philippe de France, Comte d'Artois, the king's brother and Colonel Général of the Swiss Regiments and the Grisons Troops in the uniform of the Swiss Guards. Although he formally held the office of Colonel Général, this position was essentially honorary; effective command and administration were exercised by Louis-Auguste Augustin, Comte d'Affry. After his duel in the Bois de Boulogne on the morning of 16 March 1778 with the Duc de Bourbon over an Incident at the Opera Ball on Mardi Gras, the Comte d'Artois dined later that day with the Duc de Polignac, the Chevalier de Crussol and the Baron de Besenval at the Hôtel de Besenval and thanked all of them for having helped to prevent a real duel with the Duc de Bourbon.

By 1789, at the dawn of the French Revolution, Pierre Victor de Besenval had accumulated the following prestigious and influential positions: Lieutenant-Général of the King's Armies, Lieutenant-Colonel of the Swiss Guards Regiment as well as Commandant en chef of the troops and garrisons in the interior of France with the exception of the city of Paris. In addition, he was also a recipient of the prestigious Order of Saint Louis, which he had received on 1 January 1766 for the reorganisation of the Swiss Regiments and the Grisons Troops, of which he was Inspecteur Général between 1762 and 1770. It was the baron's wish to hand over the office of Inspecteur Général to his compatriot Anton de Salis de Marschlins. In 1787, Jean-Baptiste-Denis Després, the secretary of Pierre Victor de Besenval, aptly summarised the baron's continued success in a letter to Maria Anna, Baronne von Roll von Emmenholz, née de Diesbach de Torny, wife of Franz Joseph, Baron von Roll von Emmenholz, a relative of the baron from Solothurn: "Le Baron de Besenval fut un de ces hommes à qui tout réussit" (the Baron de Besenval was one of those men to whom all things prospered).

==== A dark cloud loomed over the Ancien Régime ====
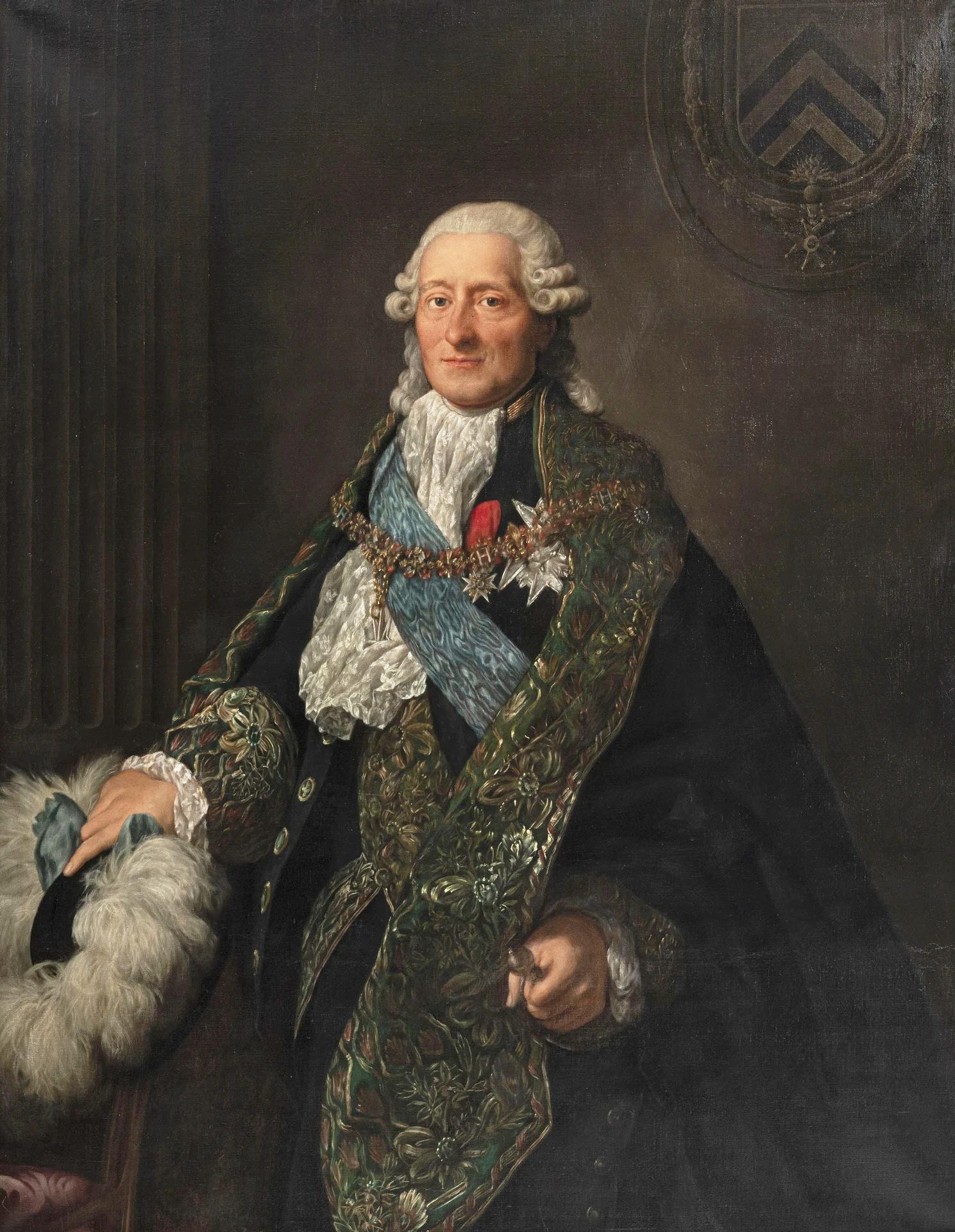
Louis-Auguste Augustin, Comte d'Affry, a friend of Pierre Victor de Besenval and a welcome guest at the Hôtel de Besenval. When the French Revolution began, he was sidelined by illness and Pierre Victor de Besenval acted as his deputy.

At the end of April 1789, Louis-Auguste Augustin, Comte d'Affry, suffered a serious accident. At the time, he was Commandant of the Swiss Guards of the city of Paris and, with the rank of colonel, served as the de facto Colonel Général of all Swiss Regiments and Grisons Troops in the service of the King of France (both line regiments and the Guards). In this capacity, he also acted as administrator for Charles-Philippe de France, Comte d'Artois. As a result of his illness, Pierre Victor, Baron de Besenval, acted as his deputy. The Commandant of the French Guards of the city of Paris at this time was Louis Marie Florent de Lomont d'Haraucourt, Duc du Châtelet, the Baron de Besenval's neighbour on the Rue de Grenelle, living opposite in the Hôtel du Châtelet. Anything but good conditions for the coming events. The Duc de Châtelet was considered inexperienced and the Baron de Besenval was already overworked.

Towards the end of the 1780s, a dark cloud loomed over the Ancien Régime. The French kingdom had fallen into financial difficulties and was even threatened with national bankruptcy. France's involvement in the War of the Austrian Succession, the Seven Years' War and the American Revolutionary War as well as the expensive royal household had severely weakened the country financially. The inflation rose and the people protested in the streets because of the sharp rise in bread prices. The price of bread had risen to its highest level in a century. King Louis XVI, who had ruled in an absolutist manner until then, had to act.

==== A misjudgement with historic consequences ====
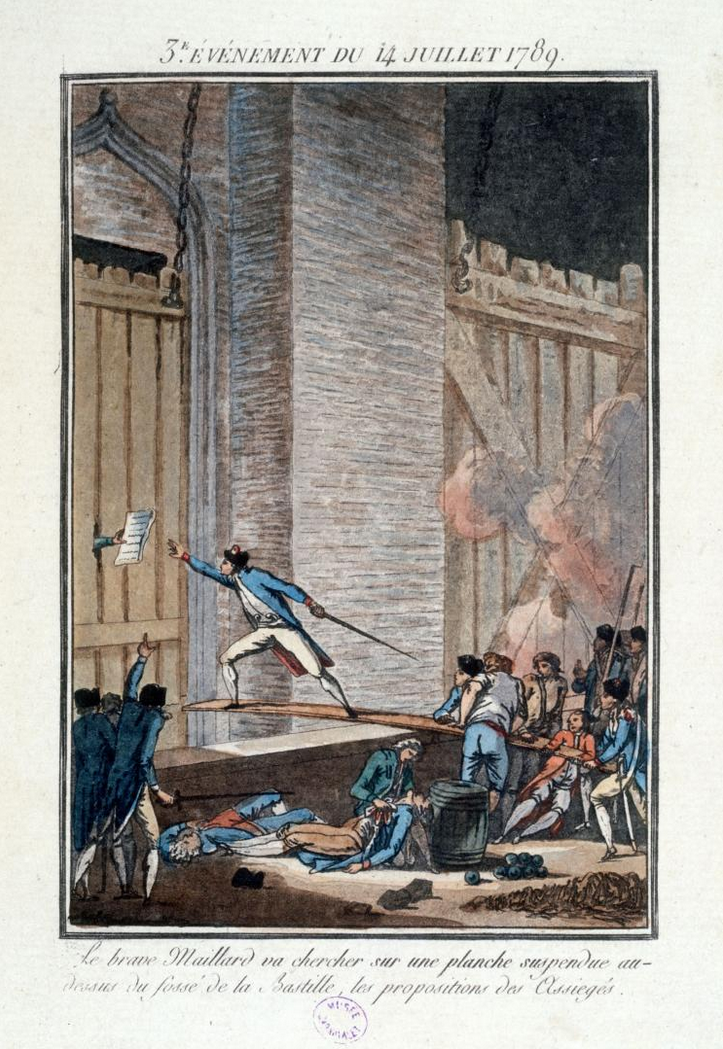
Negotiations on the plank: In the late afternoon of 14 July 1789, on the orders of the Governor of the Bastille, Bernard-René Jourdan, Marquis de Launay, Ludwig von Flüe, the commanding officer of the Swiss Guards in the defense of the Bastille, handed over the letter of capitulation with the governor's demands to Stanislas-Marie Maillard through one of the two holes the Swiss Guards had made in the drawbridge of the Bastille, which were intended to serve as gunholes. On the other side of the drawbridge Stanislas-Marie Maillard climbed onto a plank above the dry moat to fetch the document. However, Bernard-René Jourdan de Launay's demands were not met by the revolutionaries. At 5.30 p.m. the Bastille was stormed and Bernard-René Jourdan de Launay lost his head.

On 5 May 1789, Les États Généraux were convened in a temporary room set up at the Hôtel des Menus-Plaisirs in Versailles. The Baron de Besenval, who attended the opening ceremony, remarked that the royal court was underestimating the seriousness of the situation.

On 1 July, the baron received a letter from the Secretary of State, Minister of War, Louis Pierre de Chastenet, Comte de Puységur, informing him that the king had decided to regroup all his troops under a single command and entrusted them to Maréchal Victor-François, Duc de Broglie. Clearly, the baron was deprived of supreme command over his troops in Île-de-France and the city of Paris. He was now reduced to simply awaiting and obeying orders. However, under the supreme command of the Maréchal de Broglie, the Baron de Besenval was appointed Commandant en chef of the troops concentrated in Paris to suppress the riots which had been going on for some time. In this capacity he was responsible for order and security in Paris as well as the territories around the capital. The maréchal and the baron were old friends. The baron had served as aide-de-camp to the maréchal during the War of the Austrian Succession. And as far as the troops in Paris were concerned, the Maréchal de Broglie left the Baron de Besenval largely in command. The maréchal had assured the baron that he would not interfere in details within the baron's sphere of authority, nor would he give direct orders to the baron's troops. The Maréchal de Broglie kept his word. A fact that would become decisive in the next few days.

On 6 July, Ludwig von Flüe, an officer of the Swiss Guards, received orders from Pierre Victor de Besenval to go to the Bastille with a detachment of the Regiment de Salis-Samade to reinforce the guards and to ensure the defence of the prison-fortress. The next day, Ludwig von Flüe arrived at the Bastille with 32 soldiers and a sergeant.

On 11 July, King Louis XVI forced the resignation of the only non-noble minister, the Finance Minister Jacques Necker. The king advised Necker to leave the country immediately. Necker followed the king's advice and left France via Brussels and Frankfurt, heading towards Basel. From Basel, Necker and his family planned to travel to his country estate, the Château de Coppet. However, with this decision the king went a step too far. A step that led to major riots among the population when the news broke on 12 July, as the Genevan banker was especially popular among the common people. His popularity among ordinary Frenchmen stood in sharp contrast to the hostility he often encountered at court, where many aristocrats looked down on the Swiss-born commoner and reformer. His popularity among the common people certainly also had something to do with the fact that, on 19 February 1781, Jacques Necker made the state finances public for the first time in the history of France in his report: The Compte rendu au Roi. The report also revealed the enormous costs to the royal household (Dépenses de la maison du Roi). Accordingly, Necker was trusted by both the common people and the revolutionary factions. In the days that followed, the events came thick and fast.

"The finances of a state constitute a centre into which innumerable channels flow: all proceeds issue from this centre, and all returns flow back to it. Should disorder reign, its baleful influence extends throughout the kingdom."

— The warning words of the Finance Minister Jacques Necker in his speech at the opening of the assembly of Les États Généraux on 5 May 1789. Not everyone was pleased to hear this. Two months later he was dismissed by the king

==== The baron's fatal decision and the beginning of the French Revolution ====
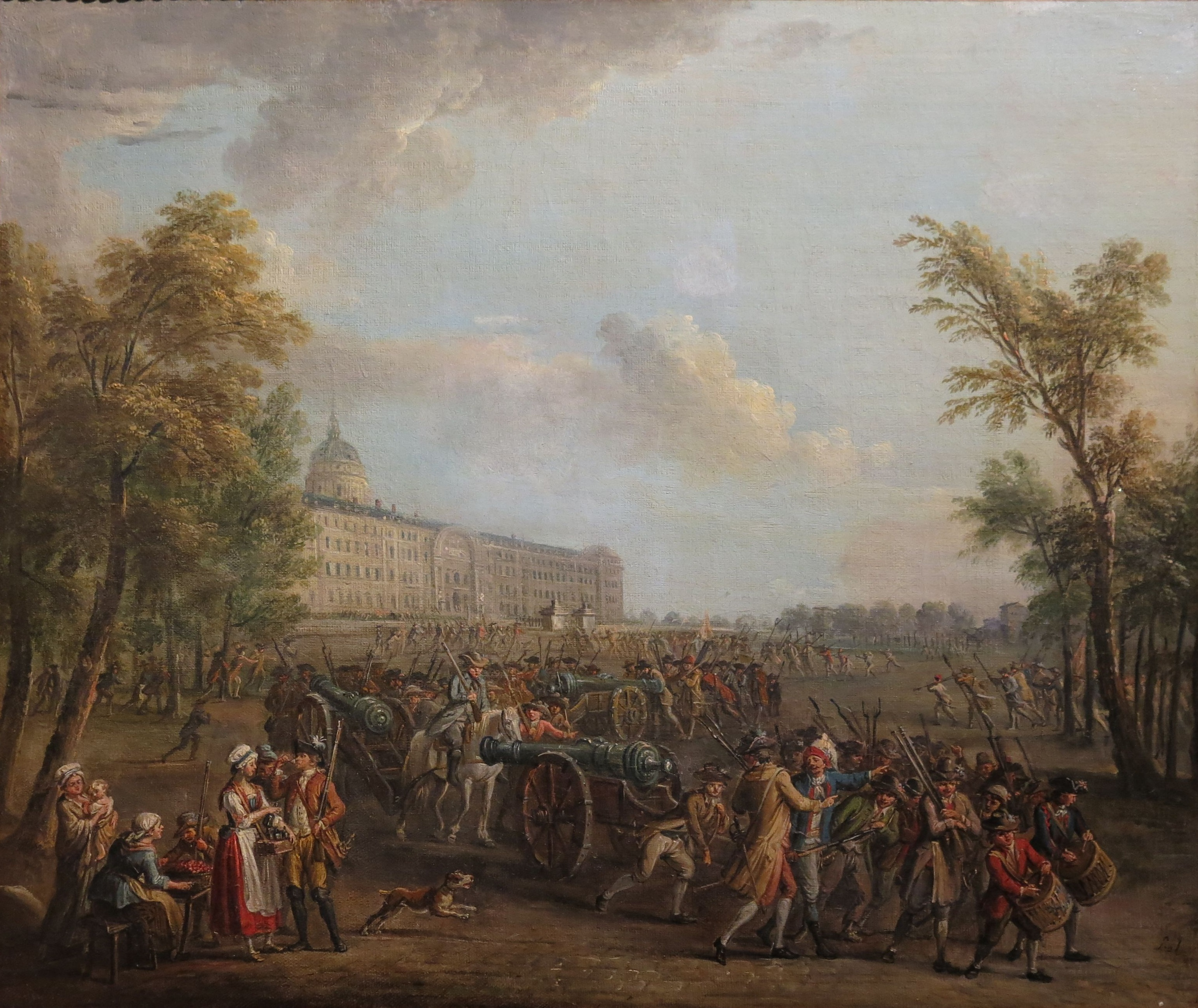
The looting of the weapons at Les Invalides on 14 July 1789, at around 10.00 a.m., after the Baron de Besenval had withdrawn his troops on the night of 12 to 13 July from central Paris. These weapons were used later that day in the Taking of the Bastille by revolutionary insurgents.

The dismissal of the popular Finance Minister Jacques Necker was the final straw, sparking large protests in revolutionary Paris on 12 July 1789. The number of protesters was far too large for the Baron de Besenval's troops to be able to oppose them. While the baron had taken drastic measures to restore order in Paris in May, he opted for a different strategy in July. On the night of 12 to 13 July, the Baron de Besenval withdrew the troops from the centre of Paris via the left bank of the Seine to the Champ de Mars in the hope of calming the situation and avoiding a bloodbath. However, many contemporaries were convinced that this decision enabled the looting of the weapons at Les Invalides on the morning of 14 July and the Taking of the Bastille later that same day by revolutionary insurgents, using the looted weapons for the Storming of the Bastille.

"I judged it wisest to withdraw the troops and leave Paris to itself."

— Pierre Victor, Baron de Besenval

The baron was convinced that his actions had prevented a civil war. However, not everyone saw it that way. On the part of the aristocrats, the baron was heavily criticised for his behavior. François-Emmanuel Guignard, Comte de Saint-Priest, was furious and accused the baron of incompetence. In his memoirs he wrote contemptuously: "A dozen battalions of foreign troops, stationed upon the Champ de Mars, together with several regiments of cavalry, were at the disposal of the Baron de Besenval, Swiss Lieutenant-Général and Commandant en chef of Paris. Besenval, however, neither appeared nor issued any orders; instead, he shut himself up in his house, from an apprehension lest it should be attacked and pillaged." And Antoine de Rivarol wrote similarly sarcastically: "The Baron de Besenval, Swiss Lieutenant-Général, kept himself shut up in his house and suffered Les Invalides to be seized, through fear that, should the disorder become general, his own dwelling, situated close at hand, might be pillaged. He had but lately caused an entire apartment to be refitted there [the new dining room], together with a bathing apartment of much elegance [the nymphaeum]. Such were the men by whom the king was served!"

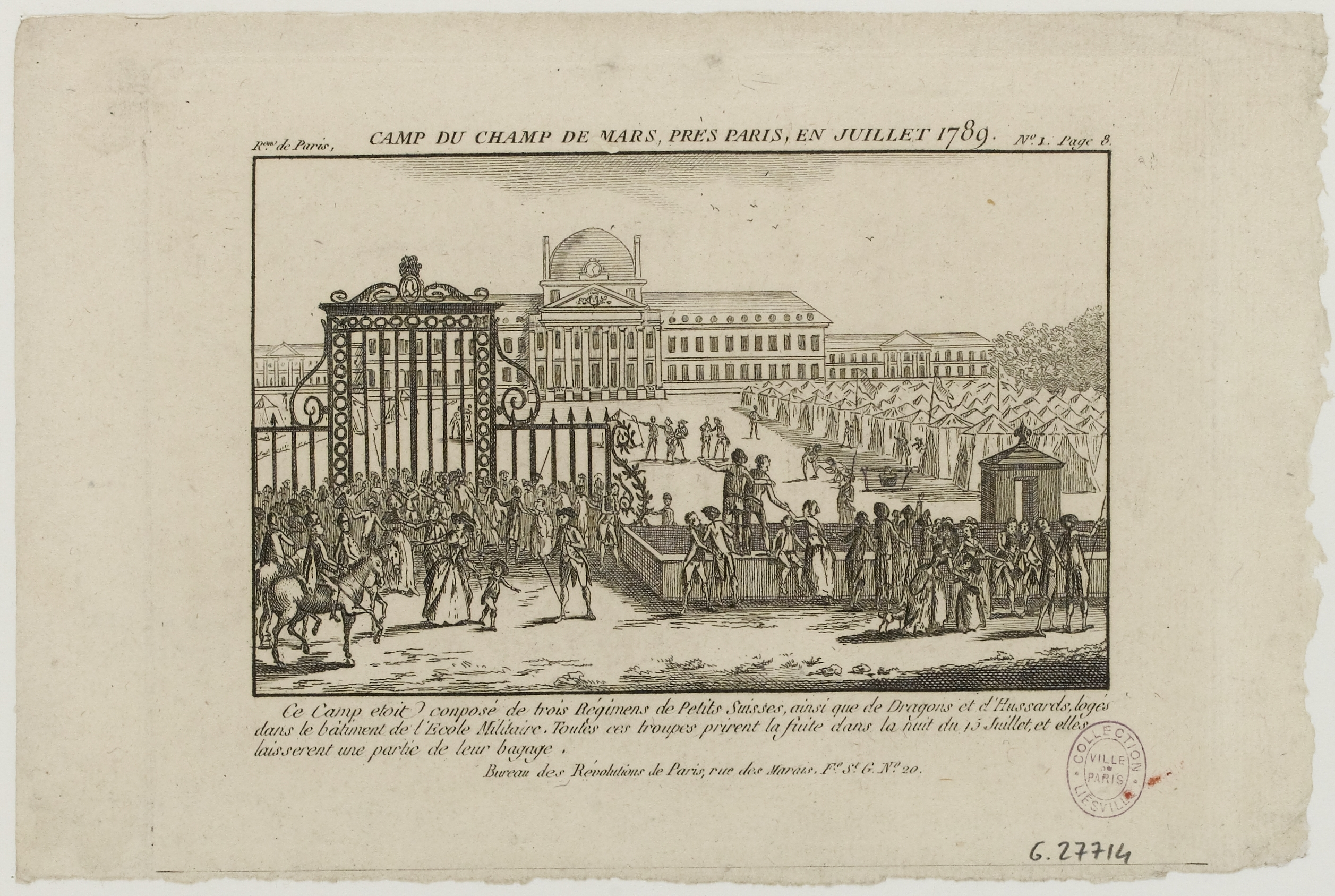
14 July 1789: The Baron de Besenval's troops in the courtyard of the École militaire on the Champ de Mars, consisting of the Swiss Regiments de Diesbach, de Châteauvieux and de Salis-Samade, the latter was the regiment in which Victor von Gibelin and Ludwig von Flüe served at that time, as well as the French Hussar Regiments de Berchény and de Chamborant. After the looting of Les Invalides and the Taking of the Bastille on 14 July 1789 by the revolutionaries, the baron's troops hastily withdrew on the night of 14 to 15 July, as the revolutionary Michel Mandar had emphatically recommended to the baron in conversation a few hours earlier.

This incident has since been considered the beginning of the French Revolution.

It is said that King Louis XVI did not learn of the Taking of the Bastille until the next morning, when the Duc de la Rochefoucauld-Liancourt informed him. "Is it a revolt?" asked the king. "No Sire," returned the duc; "this is no revolt – it is a revolution."

Back in Versailles, Pierre Victor de Besenval was the first to inform the king, on the morning of 15 July, of the true extent of the events in Paris in all their details, drawing on his own first-hand observations.

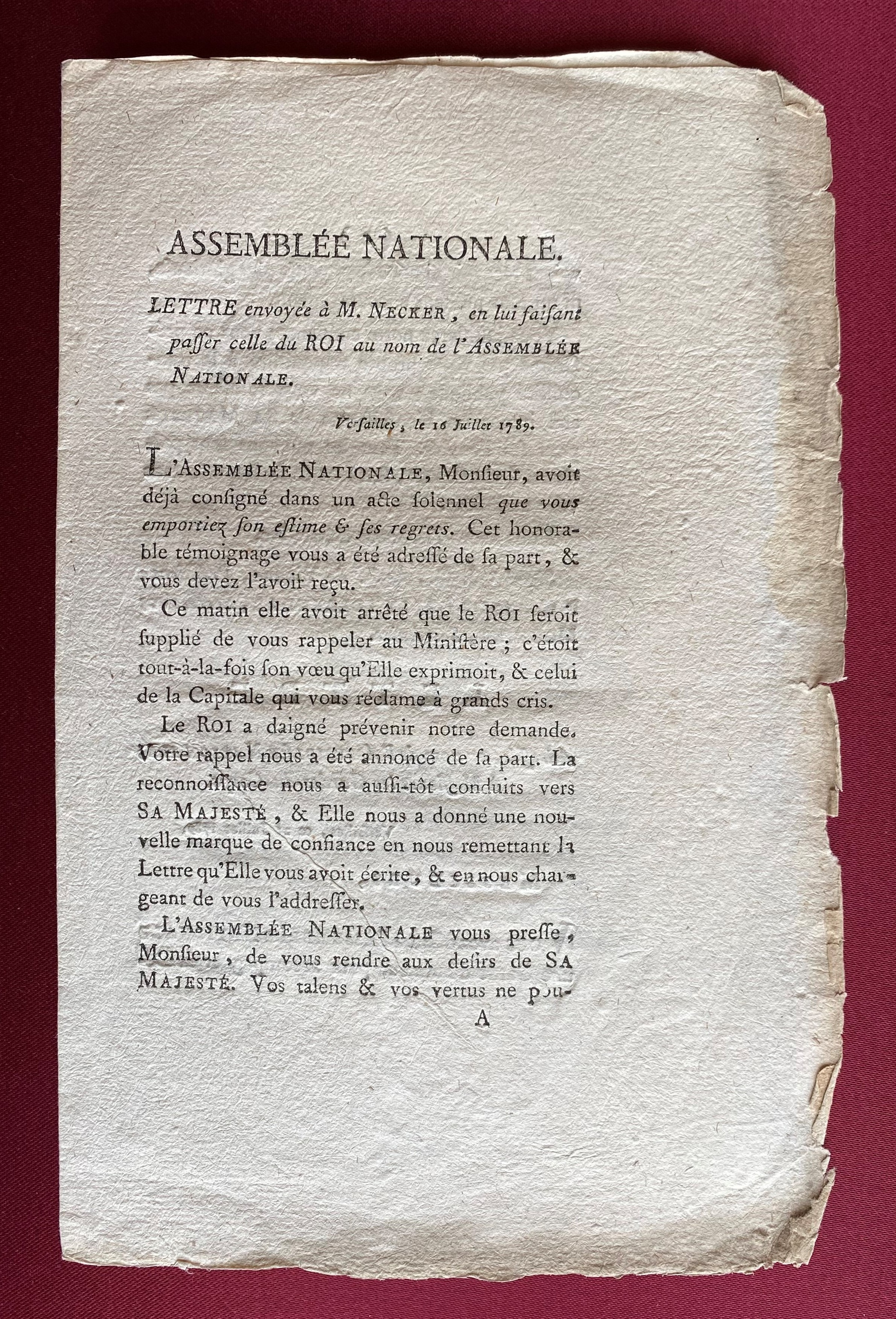
Excerpt from the publication of the letter of the National Constituent Assembly to Jacques Necker, dated 16 July 1789, asking him to resume his duties as Finance Minister. This letter was attached to the king's personal letter and ended: La Nation, son Roi & ses Représentants vous attendent, signed by: Jean Georges Lefranc de Pompignan, Archevêque de Vienne, Président, Trophime-Gérard, Comte de Lally et Baron de Tollendal, Secrétaire, Jean Joseph Mounier, Secrétaire.

One of the consequences of the Taking of the Bastille was that the king and the National Constituent Assembly recalled the Finance Minister Jacques Necker to his post in separate but coordinated letters. Both letters were dated 16 July and were sent together. The king wrote: "(…) but the wish of Les États Généraux and of the city of Paris urges me to hasten your arrival. I therefore entreat you to return without delay and to resume your place at my side (…)." This in turn led to the Maréchal de Broglie emigrating that same day, after having been Secretary of State, Minister of War, for only four days (according to a contemporary defamatory pamphlet, his term of office lasted exactly: 36 hours, 44 minutes and 25 seconds). The king's brother, Charles-Philippe de France, Comte d'Artois, followed suit. On the night of 16 to 17 July, he left France with his two sons and his Adjutant Louis Robert, Baron de Roll, heading towards Brussels. The two letters reached Necker by royal courier on 21 July at the Hostellerie Les Trois Rois in Basel, where he was staying with his family while passing through and where he had met with Yolande Martine Gabrielle de Polastron, Duchesse de Polignac, at her request. While Jacques Necker was on his way to his country estate, the Château de Coppet, the Duchesse de Polignac was fleeing from the revolutionary troops in France. Meanwhile, Bertrand Dufresne, Necker's secretary, had also arrived in Basel to try to persuade him to return to France. Necker accepted the king's request in a letter dated 23 July and returned to France that same day. One day earlier, on 22 July, Jacques Necker's successor, the 74-year-old Joseph Foullon de Doué, was supposed to be lynched à la lanterne. However, since the ropes used for hanging broke several times, he was eventually beheaded by an angry mob, who then impaled his head on a pike and paraded it through the streets of Paris with a tuft of hay in his mouth. On 29 July, Jacques Necker arrived in Versailles, where he was enthusiastically received by the population.

In his memoirs, which were only published after his death, the Baron de Besenval says that during the critical phase between 12 and 14 July he waited a long time in vain for orders from the Maréchal de Broglie. In distant Versailles, they were apparently unaware of the seriousness of the situation. However, the baron also confirms that on 14 July, when he withdrew the troops from the Champ de Mars to Sèvres, he had acted on the orders of the Maréchal de Broglie:

"Weakened by the defection [of certain soldiers], and convinced of my own uselessness, I resolved to return [with the troops] to Sèvres at nightfall; and no sooner had the troops begun their march than I received orders from the Maréchal de Broglie to withdraw."

— Pierre Victor, Baron de Besenval

The baron, accused of high treason by the aristocrats and of the crime of lèse-nation by the revolutionaries, had no choice but to flee to Switzerland, his home country.

==== L'affaire de Monsieur de Besenval: Besenval's escape, arrest and release ====
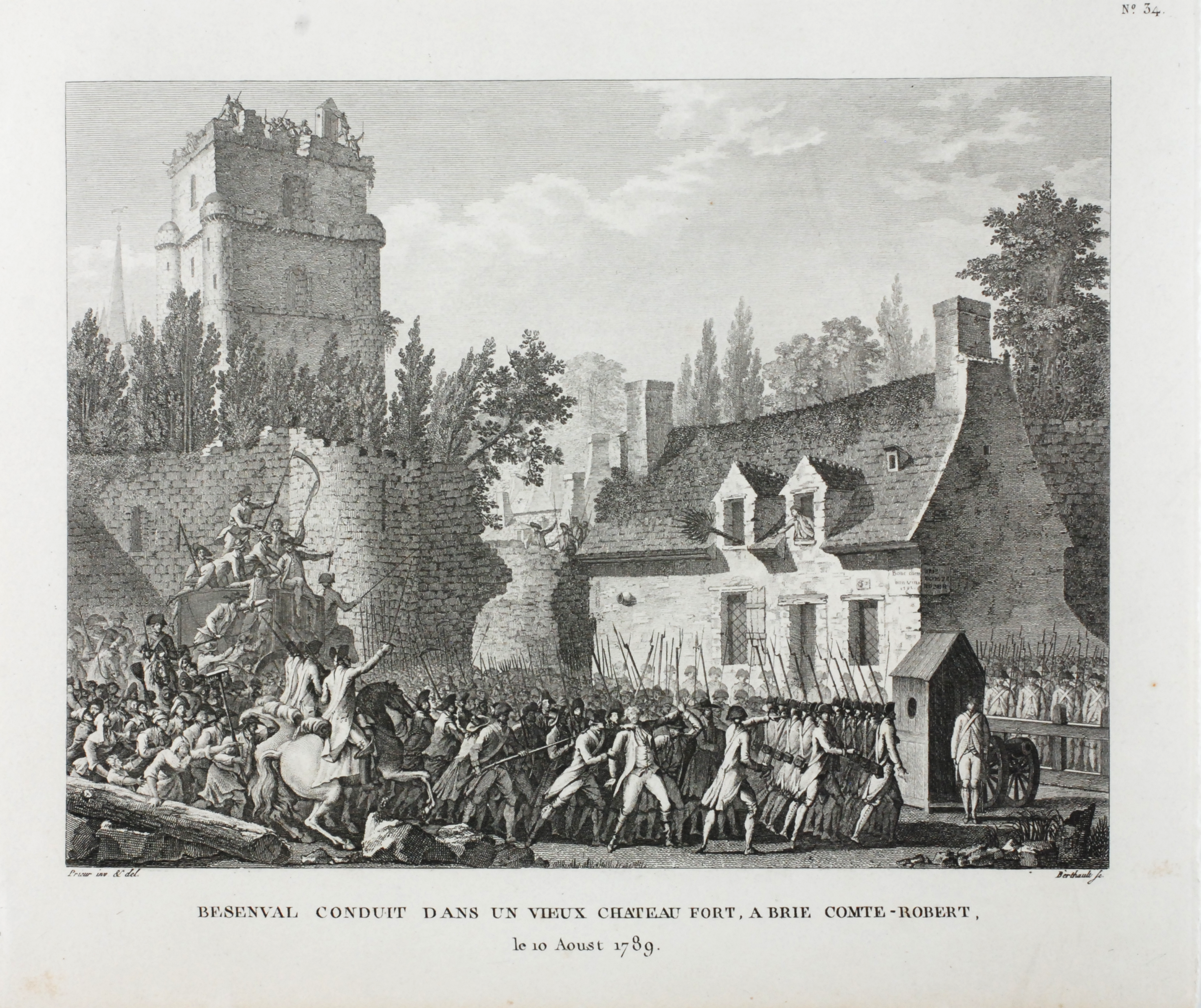
In August 1789, the Baron de Besenval was taken to the partially destroyed Château de Brie-Comte-Robert for imprisonment, where he was placed under guard by a detachment of the Basoche, commanded by François Louis Bourdon. The baron habitually referred to his decidedly unbefitting quarters as his "horrible cachot" (horrible dungeon).

Pierre Victor de Besenval was not only hated by the revolutionary masses as a soldier, but he was also distrusted as a close friend of Queen Marie-Antoinette. When the revolutionary masses demanded his head, the baron obtained permission from the king to leave for Switzerland, after having spoken to him on 19 July 1789 at the Château de Versailles.

In his memoirs the baron recalls:

"On 19 July, I visited the king, the ministers being all absent. (...) He pressed me to make my escape, and I therefore resolved to return to Switzerland."

— Pierre Victor, Baron de Besenval

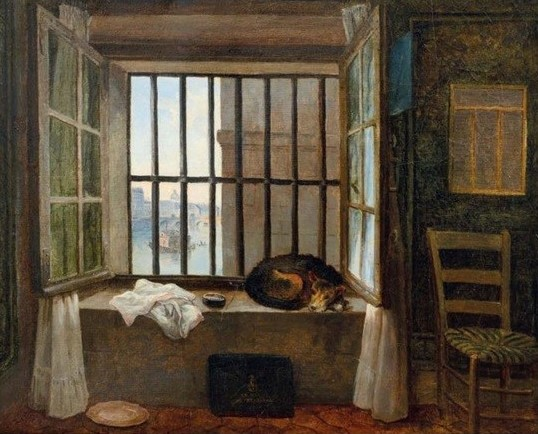
Vue de la cellule du Baron de Besenval à la prison du Châtelet, by Hubert Robert (1789). The inscription on the briefcase under the window reads Le Baron de Bezenval.

But just one day after his departure from Paris, the baron was recognised by revolutionary troops during his trip on 26 July at the Auberge in Villegruis near Provins. He was immediately arrested. First, the baron was taken to nearby Villenauxe-la-Grande, where he was placed under house arrest at the Hôtel du Cheval Bardé. He was eventually imprisoned at the Château de Brie-Comte-Robert before being charged with the crime of lèse-nation in mid-October and transferred to the prison Grand Châtelet in Paris on 7 November. In his prison cell, which was quite comfortable since it was actually the prison chaplain's room, the baron was allowed to be served by his valet, who ordered the baron's meals from the best caterers in town. In addition, he was allowed to receive visitors, who came in large numbers. Amongst others, he received members of the influential family de Ségur, with whom the baron was very close, and Gouverneur Morris, the future Minister Plenipotentiary of the United States of America to the Court of Versailles, on 17 November. To Morris, the baron reported that he was convinced a counter-revolution would soon take place. Another visitor was the painter Hubert Robert, whose painting Vue de la cellule du Baron de Besenval à la prison du Châtelet (View from the Baron de Besenval's cell in the Châtelet prison) bears witness to his visit to this day. The painting has been part of the collections of the Louvre since 2012.

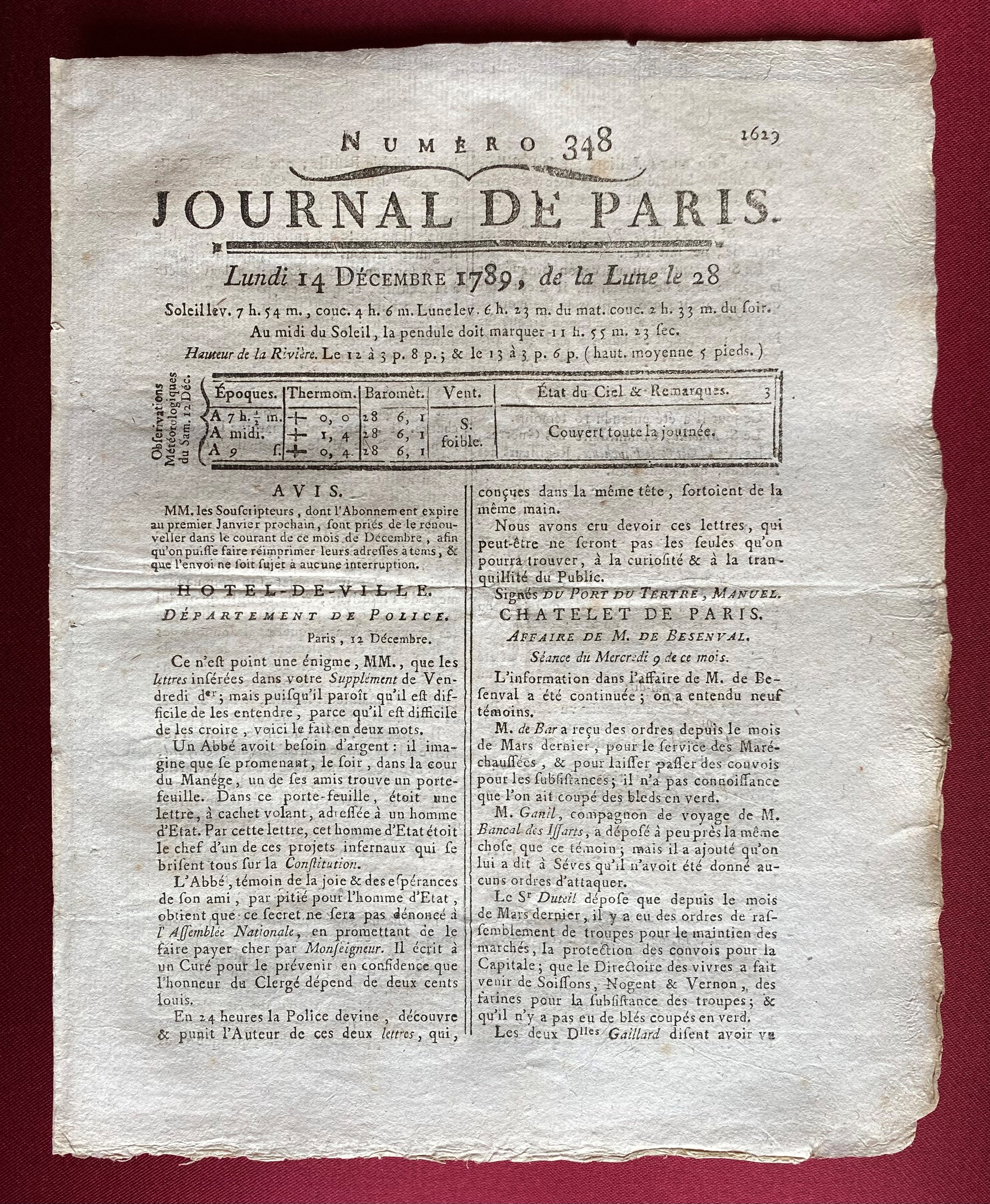
The Baron de Besenval made headlines for months in the Journal de Paris. The public took a keen interest in the trial against the Swiss baron.

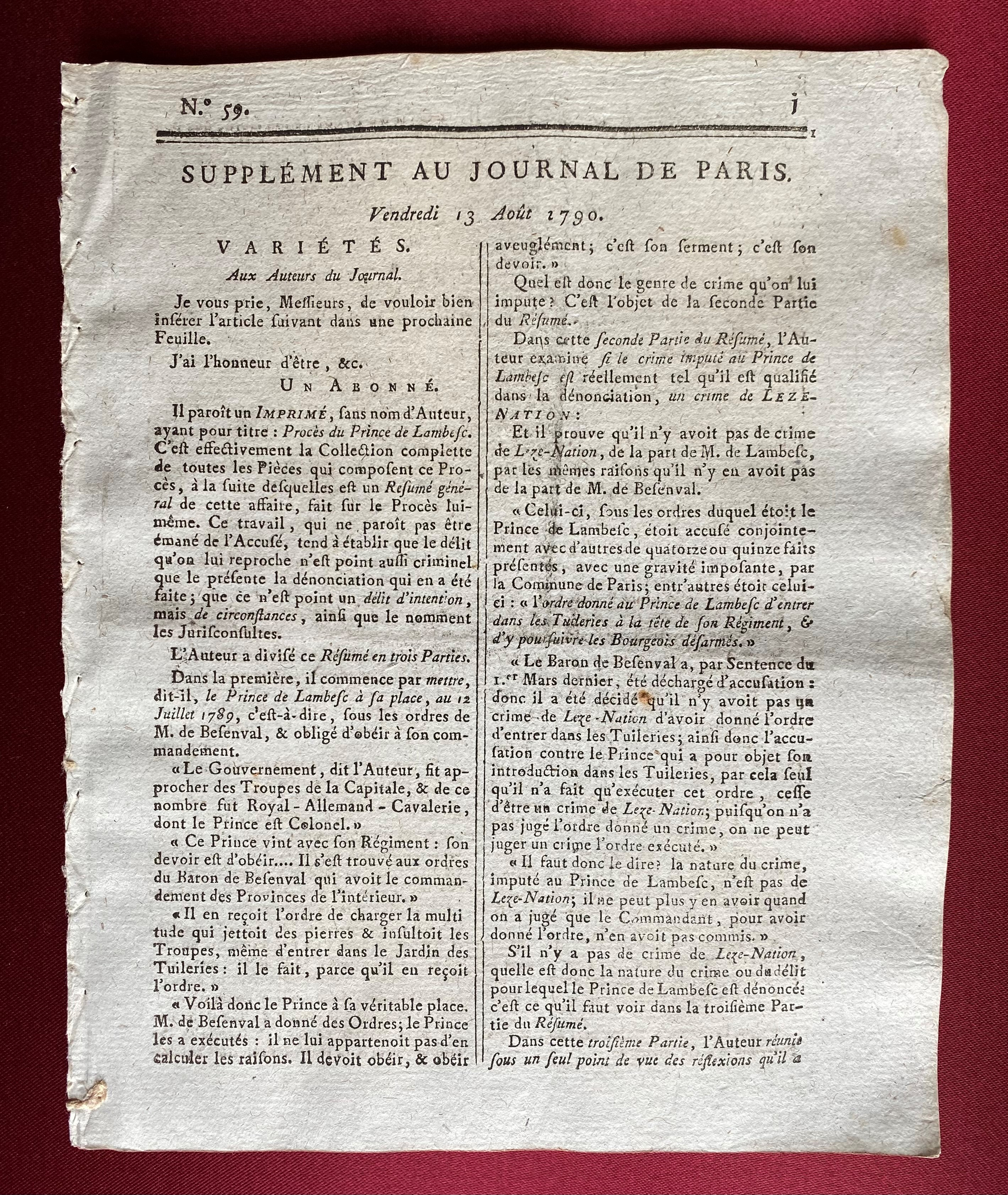
Excerpt from the Journal de Paris, no. 225, Friday, 13 August 1790: Acquittal on Monday, 1 March 1790 – The Baron de Besenval is acquitted of the crime of lèse-nation.

During his imprisonment, evidence was collected against Pierre Victor de Besenval. On 1 August 1789, a house search was carried out on the orders of the municipal council of Paris. Maître Jean-Jacques Grandin, commissioner of the prison court of the Grand Châtelet from 1782 to 1791, accompanied by two witnesses, went to the Hôtel de Besenval to seal all the baron's filing cabinets and his bureau plat in order to secure evidence. In addition, he also interrogated the baron's staff. The aristocratic society was alarmed. This incident caused many nobles to prepare their escape from France. The baron's trial began on 21 November with the first judicial questioning. Pierre Victor de Besenval's life hung by a thread.

Only through the intervention of his compatriot, the Genevan banker and French Finance Minister Jacques Necker, did Pierre Victor de Besenval escape being lynched after his arrest in Villegruis. It was on his return journey from Basel to Versailles, at the end of July 1789, that Jacques Necker learned, at a stopover in Nogent-sur-Seine, of the arrest of the Baron de Besenval. The baron was eventually released on 1 March 1790, having won his case before the court of the Grand Châtelet, thanks to the indefatigable support of his soldiers and friends, such as the Duc de la Rochefoucauld-Liancourt, the Duc de Luynes and the Comte de Mirabeau, who testified in his favour. But also thanks to the closing argument of his lawyer Raymond Desèze and thanks to Jacques Necker, who had held his protective hand over him. Saved from the guillotine and released from prison, the baron returned that same day to his residence on the Rue de Grenelle, protected by the Swiss Guards and escorted by a crowd of friends.

However, not everyone was enthusiastic about this verdict. Quite a few regarded this judgement as a courtesy decision in favour of the Swiss Guards, who were favoured by the royal court, and as a concession to Jacques Necker. He had demanded a pardon for Pierre Victor de Besenval at a reception at the Hôtel de Ville in Paris on 30 July 1789, in the presence of the Mayor of Paris, Jean Sylvain Bailly, and the Commandant Général de la Garde Bourgeoise, the Marquis de Lafayette, as well as of the 120 representatives of the Commune de Paris and further high-ranking dignitaries. Necker asked in his statement: "It is not only before you, but before the humblest and most obscure citizen of Paris, that I prostrate myself and fall upon my knees, to implore that no one may exercise, either towards M. de Besenval or towards any other person whatsoever, severities of the kind of which I have been informed. (...) What I ask is consideration for a foreign general, should that alone suffice; indulgence and kindness, should he require more. (...) I should deem myself most happy if this example were to become the signal for a general amnesty, and thus restore tranquility to France."

Due to the fame of Pierre Victor de Besenval and his prominent friends, some of whom also enjoyed respect among the revolutionaries and had campaigned for the baron's release, the Besenval Case had soon developed into a test case of fair justice in revolutionary France. In addition to the popular Jacques Necker, the much-respected Marquis de Lafayette had also demanded the release of Pierre Victor de Besenval. Furthermore, the Swiss cantons had also protested against the baron's arrest, especially his compatriots from the Canton of Solothurn.

One of the less pleased about the baron's release was François-René, Vicomte de Chateaubriand. In his Mémoires d'Outre-Tombe, published in 1849 and 1850, he commented cynically on Pierre Victor de Besenval's acquittal: "This incriminated baron, compromised in the Bastille affair and saved by M. Necker and by Mirabeau solely for being Swiss – what a misfortune!"

"Monsieur Necker saved my life. (...) I swear loyalty and gratitude to him unto my dying day."

— Pierre Victor, Baron de Besenval

==== Death after dinner: Le Suisse le plus français qui ait jamais été ====
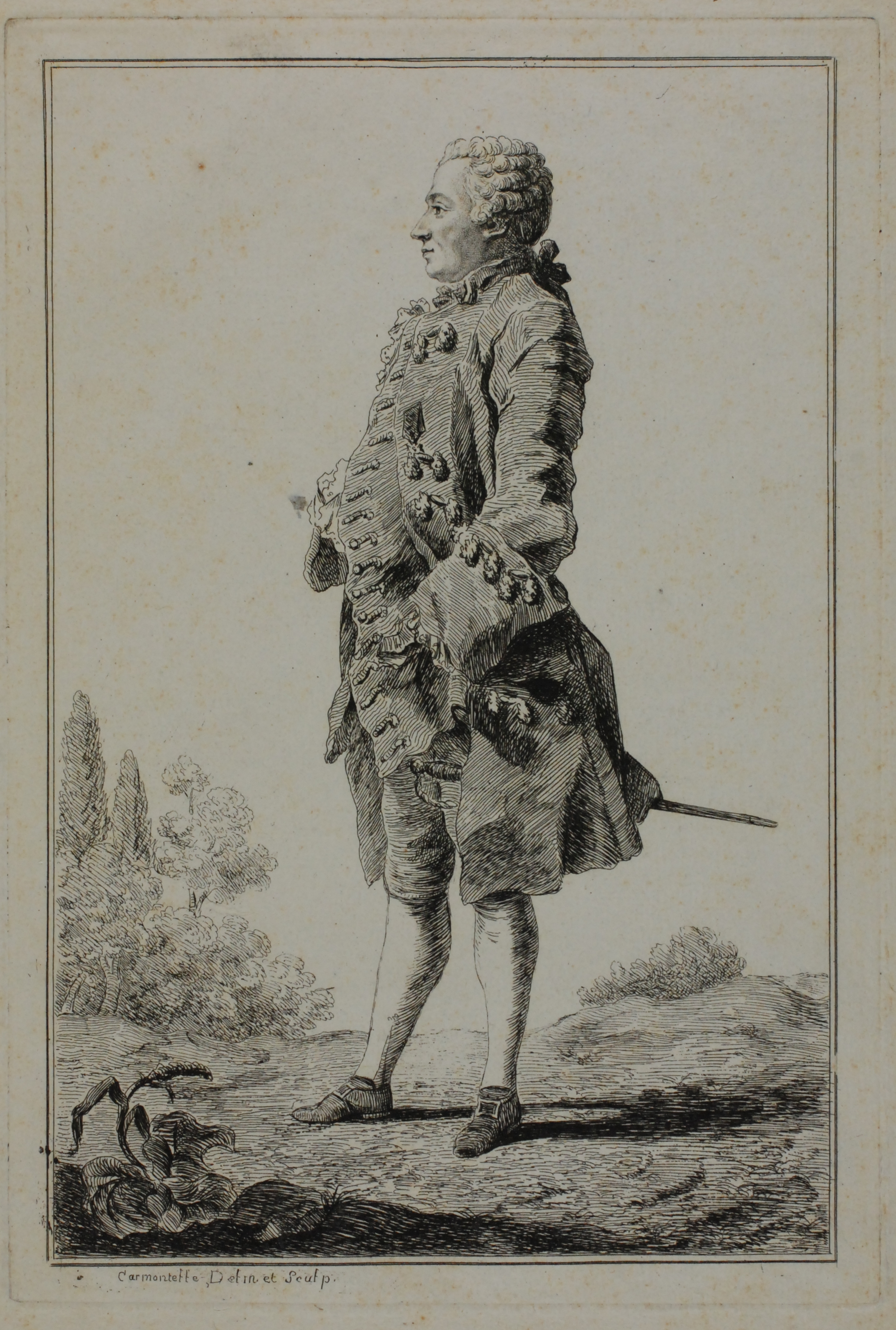
Pierre Victor de Besenval as a courtier around 1780, etching by Louis Carrogis Carmontelle.

After his release, Pierre Victor de Besenval resumed his work in the king's service. But soon he was no longer able to hold office, as the seven-month imprisonment and the ongoing danger to his life had severely affected his health. His condition worsened day by day. After having already had his portrait painted by some of the most famous French painters, such as Jean-Marc Nattier, Jean-Baptiste Greuze and Louis Carrogis Carmontelle, the baron commissioned his last portrait from Henri-Pierre Danloux in spring 1791. Shortly after this most famous portrait of his was completed, his strength failed him at length.

The baron died on 2 June 1791 after dinner in the bedroom of his residence in Paris, surrounded by twenty five friends and relatives, including his mistress Catherine-Louise, Marquise de Courcelles et de La Suze, née de Santo-Domingo (1757–1826), wife of Louis-François de Chamillart, Marquis de Courcelles et de La Suze, his compatriot from Solothurn, the Swiss Guard Victor von Gibelin, also known as Beau Gibelin, and his son Joseph-Alexandre Pierre, Vicomte de Ségur. The autopsy found the cause of death to be a polyp in the heart.

"He looked like a mere shadow. His sunken, still beautiful face was deathly pale, and his eyes stared unseeing. An hour later, he lay dead in my arms."

— Victor von Gibelin, Sous-Lieutenant of the Company de Besenval of the Swiss Guards, on the appearance of Pierre Victor de Besenval in the dining room of the Hôtel de Besenval on 2 June 1791 and his death that night

"Le Suisse le plus français qui ait jamais été" (the most French Swiss that ever was), as Charles Augustin Sainte-Beuve once called Pierre Victor, Baron de Besenval, was buried on 6 June 1791 in the church of Saint-Sulpice in Paris, the burial place of his family, in the presence of his friends and his only child, his son Joseph-Alexandre Pierre, Vicomte de Ségur.

=== From the Baron de Besenval's death in 1791 to 1925 ===
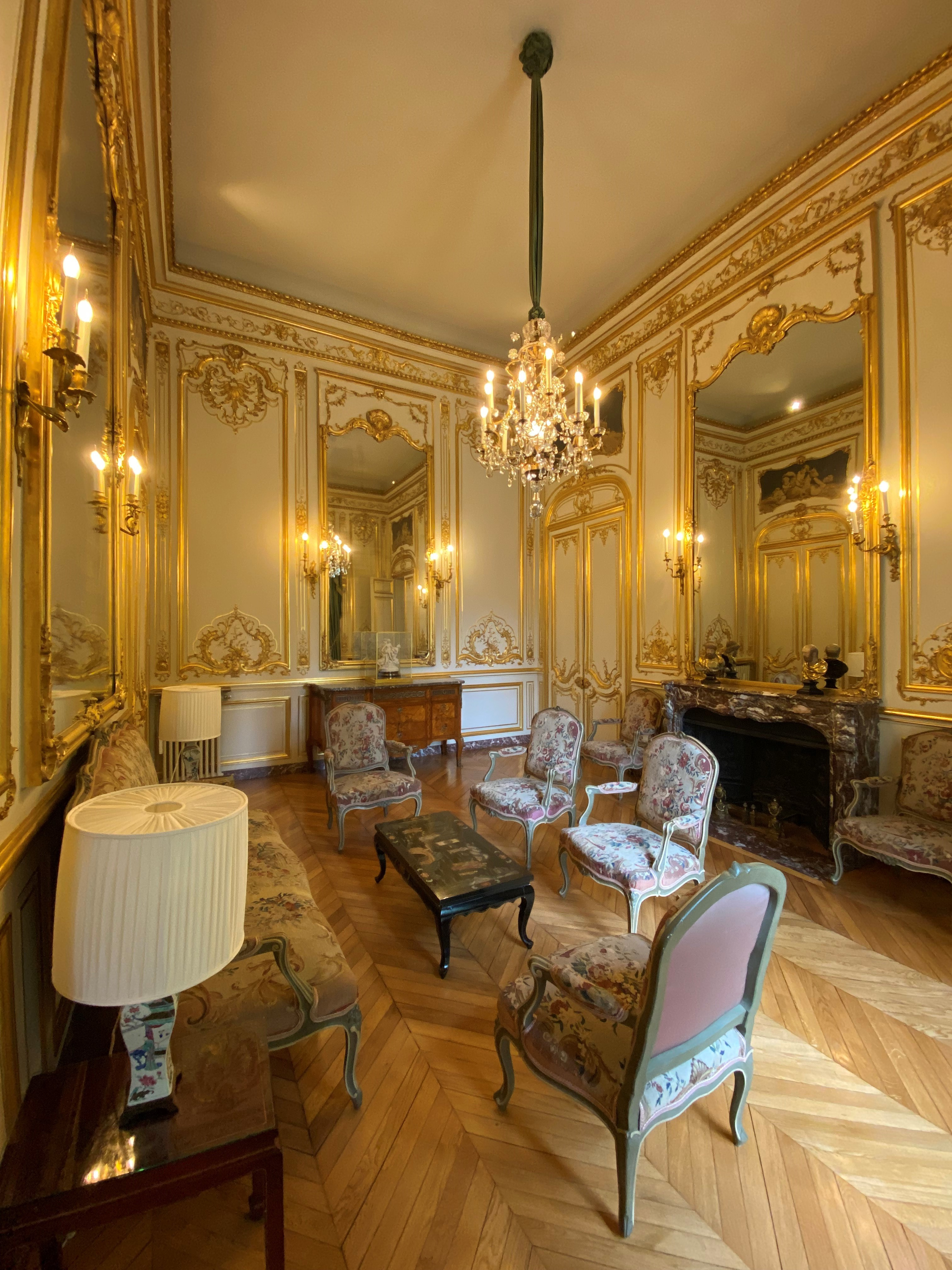
Chambre du maître, the former bedroom of the Baron de Besenval, where he died on 2 June 1791 in the arms of Victor von Gibelin. The room has four overdoors with grisaille painting by Jules Didier, after engravings by François Boucher, showing landscape scenes with sheep, birds and putti, interpreting the three seasons autumn, winter and spring. The fourth overdoor is dedicated to love. Parts of the wood panelling are original with later additions of panels from the Louis XV period and the last quarter of the 19th century. Today, the room is called the Salon des ministres. The baron's writing table, dating in parts from around 1720 and remodelled by the ebeniste E. J. Cuvellier around 1765, was placed in this room. On 25 May 2021, this bureau plat and the accompanying cartonnier (filing cabinet), made by Bernard III van Risenburgh, were sold by Christie's in London as lot 30 in the sale Collection Baroness Marion Lambert for EUR 462,500.

In his will dated 20 December 1784, Pierre Victor de Besenval, who was never married, bequeathed the usufruct of his residence on the Rue de Grenelle to his lifelong friend Maréchal Philippe Henri, Marquis de Ségur, Baron de Romainville, Seigneur de Ponchapt et de Fougueyrolles, whose second son Joseph-Alexandre Pierre, Vicomte de Ségur, was in fact the baron's illegitimate son, which was no secret within the family. The baron's relationship with his best friend's wife Louise-Anne-Madeleine, Marquise de Ségur, née de Vernon (1729–1778), which lasted until her death, and the illegitimate son did not cloud the relationship between the spouses or between Besenval and his best friend. But on the contrary. The three enjoyed being together. The baron spent a lot of time at the château of the Marquis de Ségur in Romainville, where he could pursue another passion: The art of horticulture (the last remains of the Château de Ségur were demolished in 2017). Furthermore, it was the intention of both the Baron de Besenval and the Marquis de Ségur that the baron's son would one day inherit the Hôtel de Besenval. Consequently, the baron bequeathed the bare ownership of the property to his biological son, Joseph-Alexandre Pierre, Vicomte de Ségur. The physical resemblance between Pierre Victor de Besenval and his son was noticed and discussed by contemporaries, including Gouverneur Morris, who wrote in his diary after a visit to the Hôtel de Besenval on 27 March 1789: "I then went to the Baron de Besenval. The company was but scanty, and there was the Vicomte de Ségur, reputed to be the son of the baron; it must be confessed that he truly is, should one take their likeness of person and mutual tenderness as proof. This young man is the Lovelace [Robert Lovelace in Clarissa] of the day, scarcely less remarkable than his father in the arts of seduction."

==== A treasure house is being auctioned off: The sale of the Hôtel de Besenval ====
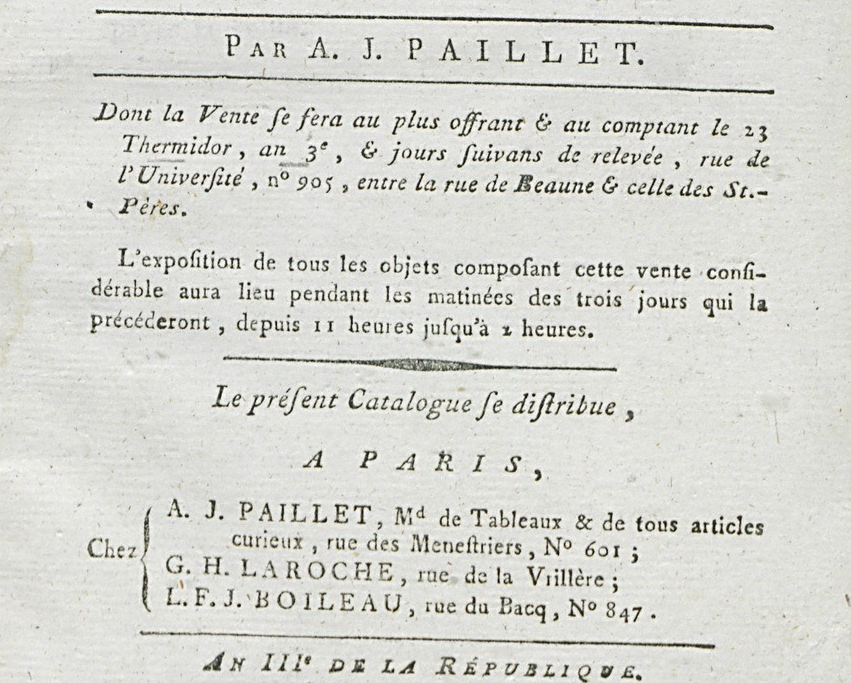
Excerpt from the auction catalogue of the sale of the Besenval Collection on 10 August 1795 (23 thermidor, an 3ème), conducted by Alexandre Joseph Paillet. For reasons of discretion and out of consideration for the difficult political situation for the nobility at the time, Pierre Victor de Besenval's name is deliberately not mentioned.

During the French Revolution, the family de Ségur was largely dispossessed and, as a result, faced financial difficulties. The Marquis de Ségur and the Vicomte de Ségur therefore decided to sell the entire contents of the Hôtel de Besenval at auction on 10 August 1795. The auction with 222 lots was conducted by Alexandre Joseph Paillet, a prominent auctioneer in Paris at the end of the 18th century. Between 1777 and 1789, Paillet also acted as an agent for The Crown, acquiring paintings for the museum in the Louvre.

In the foreword to the auction catalogue, Alexandre Joseph Paillet praises the baron's collection: "The precious and considerable collection, of which we are now announcing the public and detailed sale by auction, will again offer amateurs a brilliant opportunity to acquire objects of the most exquisite quality."

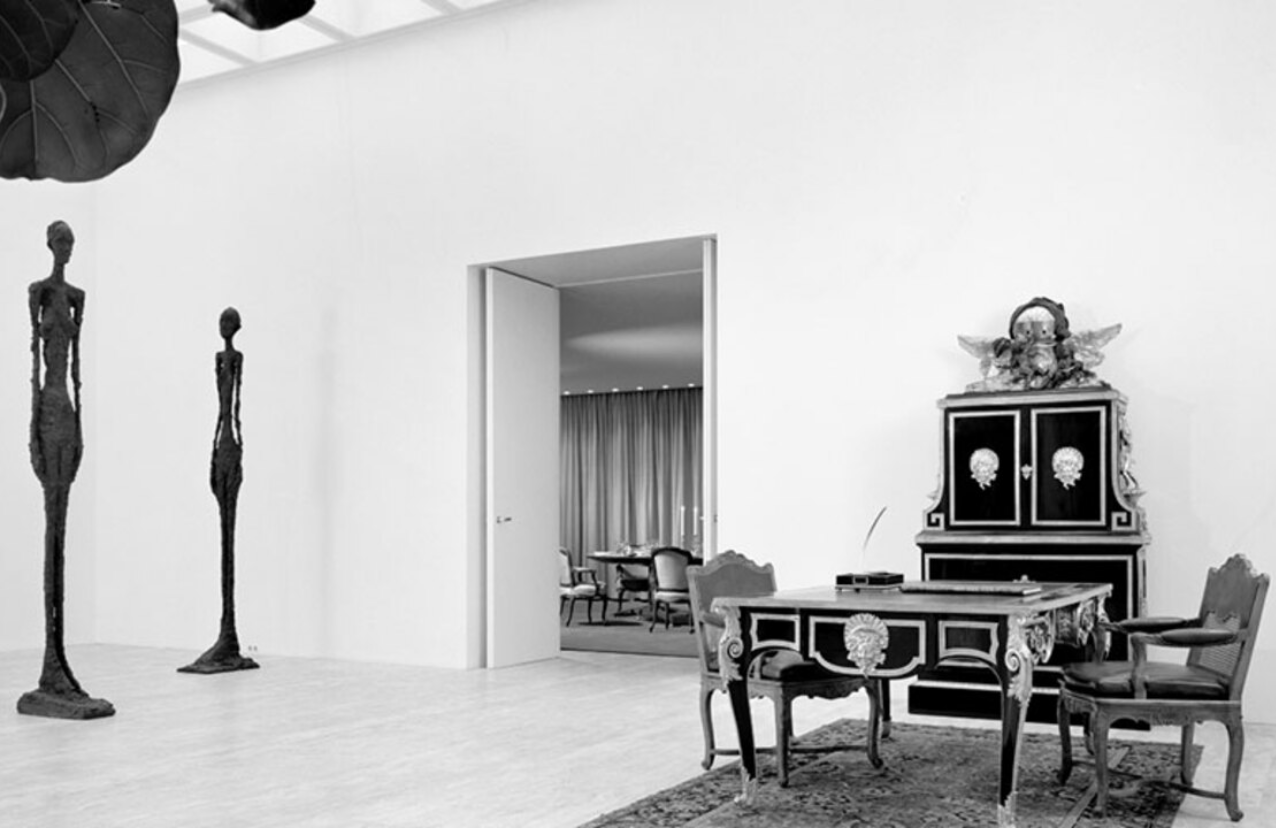
The Baron de Besenval's bureau plat and the cartonnier (filing cabinet) with the pendule on top, signed by the master clockmaker Michel Stollenwerck, together with sculptures by Alberto Giacometti in a private apartment in the 1950s.

Notably, no seating furniture was offered for sale in the auction catalogue; the same applies to books. As for the furniture, part of it remained in the possession of Joseph-Alexandre Pierre, Vicomte de Ségur, in memory of his father. In his will dated 18 May 1804, the Vicomte de Ségur bequeathed the remaining furniture of the Baron de Besenval to his partner and mother of his son, Alexandre Joseph de Ségur (1793–1864), Reine Claude de Mesmes d'Avaux, Comtesse d'Avaux, née Chartraire de Bourbonne, Dame de Bourbonne-les-Bains (1764–1812). In addition, a smaller and less spectacular auction had already taken place on 28 November 1794, during which at least part of the library was sold. The proceeds from this first sale amounted to 19,269 livres.

It is an irony of history that the entire contents of the Hôtel de Besenval were sold at auction, as Pierre Victor de Besenval rarely bought at auctions. He preferred to buy his furniture and artworks either directly from the artists or from established dealers such as Lazare Duvaux or Jean-Baptiste-Pierre Lebrun. The proceeds of the main auction on 10 August 1795 amounted to almost two million livres (1,732,233 livres and 12 sols), a considerable sum that contributed to the financial recovery of the family de Ségur.

==== A taste for the finer things in life ====
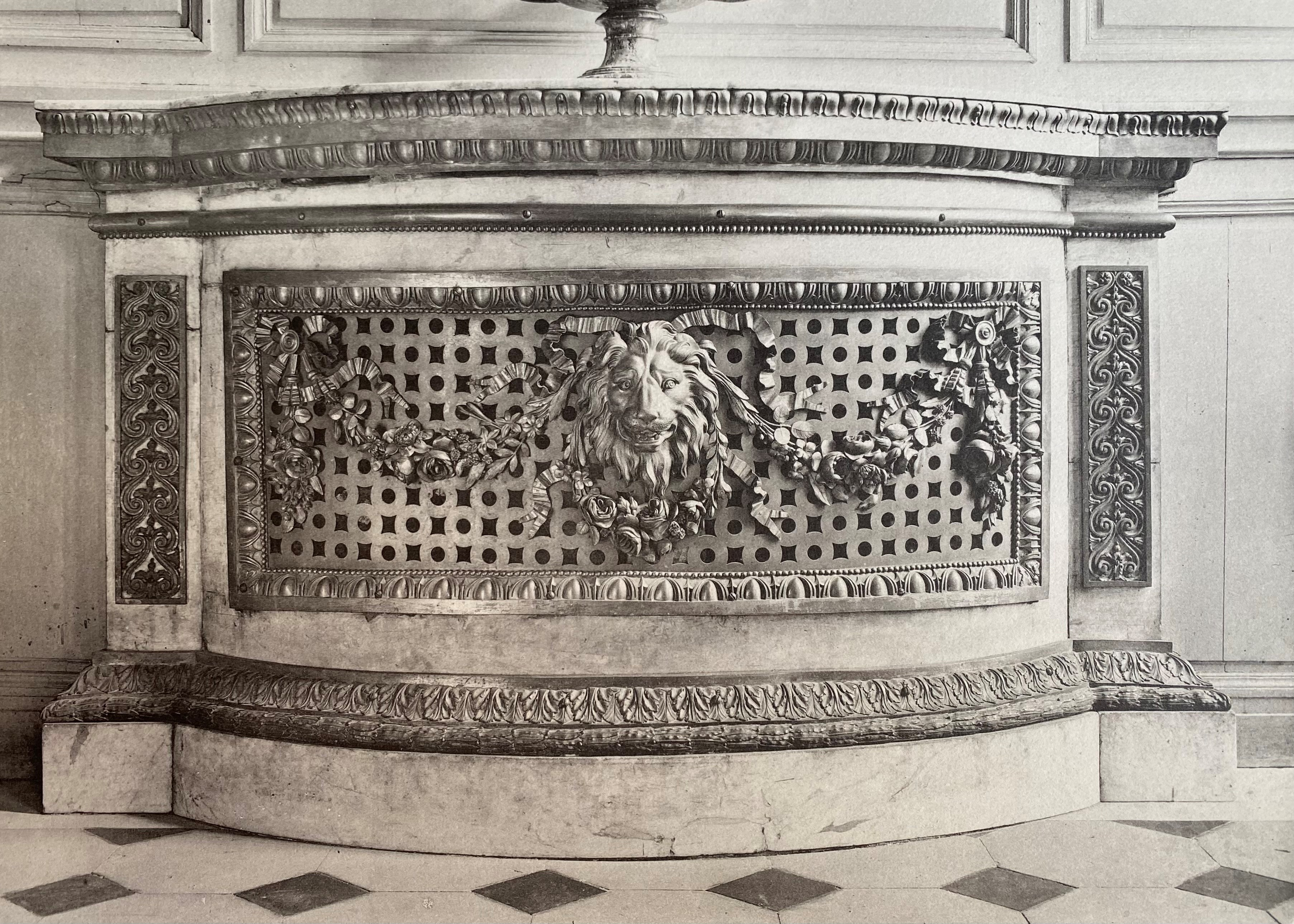
Installed by Pierre Victor de Besenval (originally in the Grand cabinet): The large and unique marble stove decorated with gilt bronzes made by Pierre Gouthière in the vestibule of the Hôtel de Besenval. Photographed before World War I. Only a few years later it was dismantled and sold. In the late 1990s the stove was with the Galerie Kraemer of Paris. The gallery later sold it to a customer in the United States for FRF 4,500,000 (at that time approximately US$ 800,000).

The considerable auction proceeds show what treasures the baron had amassed in the Hôtel de Besenval over the course of his life. His contemporaries already reported that the Hôtel de Besenval was a real treasure house.

The prestige of his collection was such that one might almost take at face value the scathing accusations of François-Emmanuel Guignard, Comte de Saint-Priest, and Antoine de Rivarol. They claimed that the Baron de Besenval had selfishly allowed the looting of Les Invalides on 14 July 1789 – when rioters seized the cannons and muskets stored in its cellars for use against the Bastille – out of fear that his nearby residence, the Hôtel de Besenval, might otherwise have been targeted.

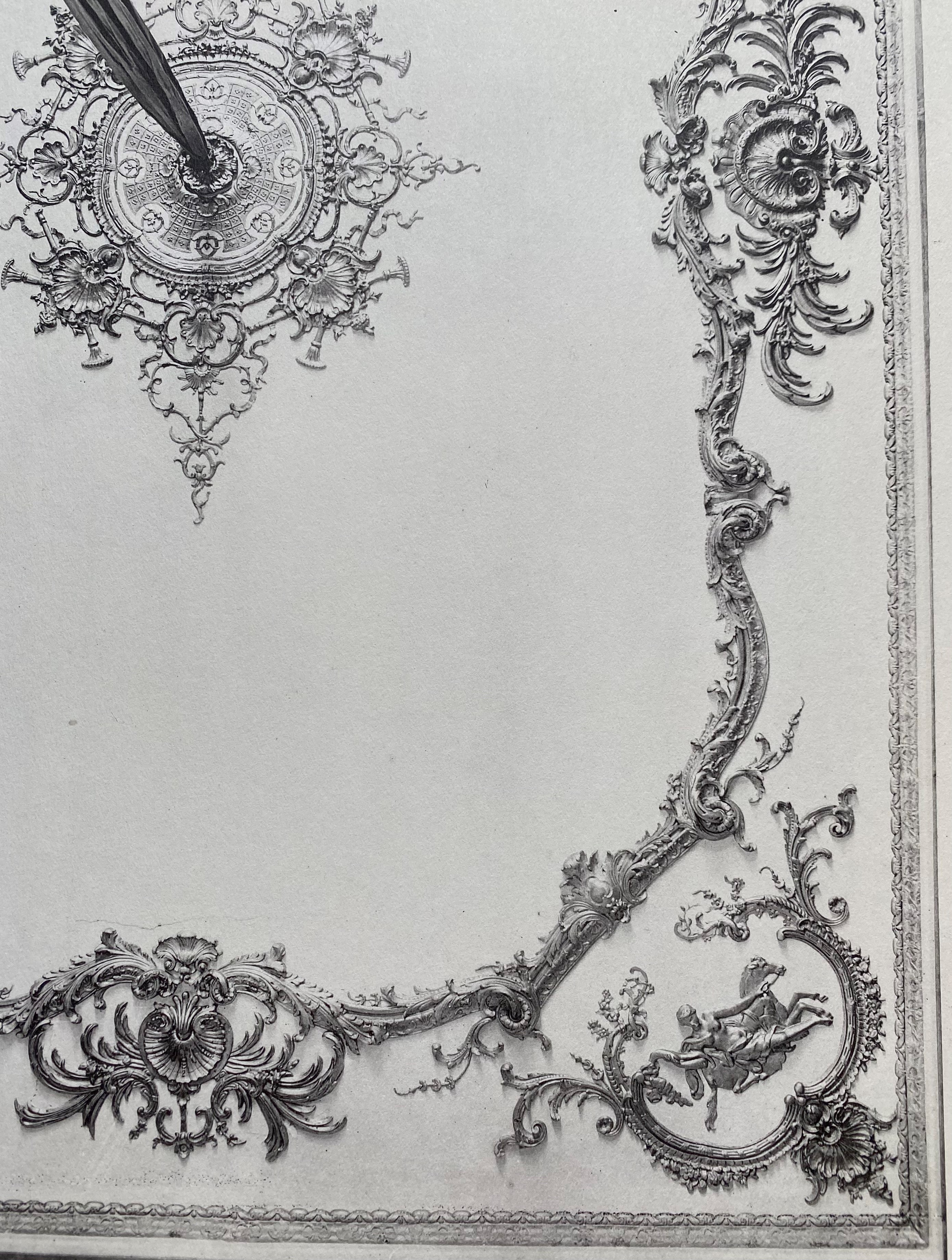
Detail of the now lost neo Louis XV ceiling of the Chambre du maître, photographed around 1910.

Luc-Vincent Thiéry's detailed description of the residence of the Baron de Besenval in his Guide des amateurs et des étrangers voyageurs à Paris, ou Description raisonnée de cette Ville, de sa Banlieue, et de tout ce qu'elles contiennent de remarquable (1787) records with great precision the ornamental wood panelling, stucco ceilings, artworks and furnishings that decorated the various rooms of the house. This account, together with the notes published in 1777 by Abbé Jean-François Brun, known as Le Brun (1732–1804), in his Almanach historique et raisonné des architectes, peintres, sculpteurs, graveurs et cizeleurs, which describe the baron's rich cabinet of paintings from the three principal schools – French, Italian and Netherlandish – and the catalogue of the sale of his collection compiled in 1795 by Alexandre Joseph Paillet, provides a remarkably comprehensive picture of the baron's distinctive taste for luxurious furniture, porcelain, paintings, sculptures and objets d'art. Or as Henriette Campan, Première Femme de Chambre of Queen Marie-Antoinette, put it: "Le Baron de Besenval avait conservé la simplicité des Suisses et acquis toute la finesse d'un courtisan français" (the Baron de Besenval retained the simplicity of the Swiss, yet tempered it with all the polish and finesse of a French courtier).

Some of the baron's treasures are also visible in the portrait titled: Le Baron de Besenval dans son salon de compagnie, painted by Henri-Pierre Danloux in 1791 and now hanging in the National Gallery in London.

==== The baron's Last Sitting – Danloux's iconic portrait ====
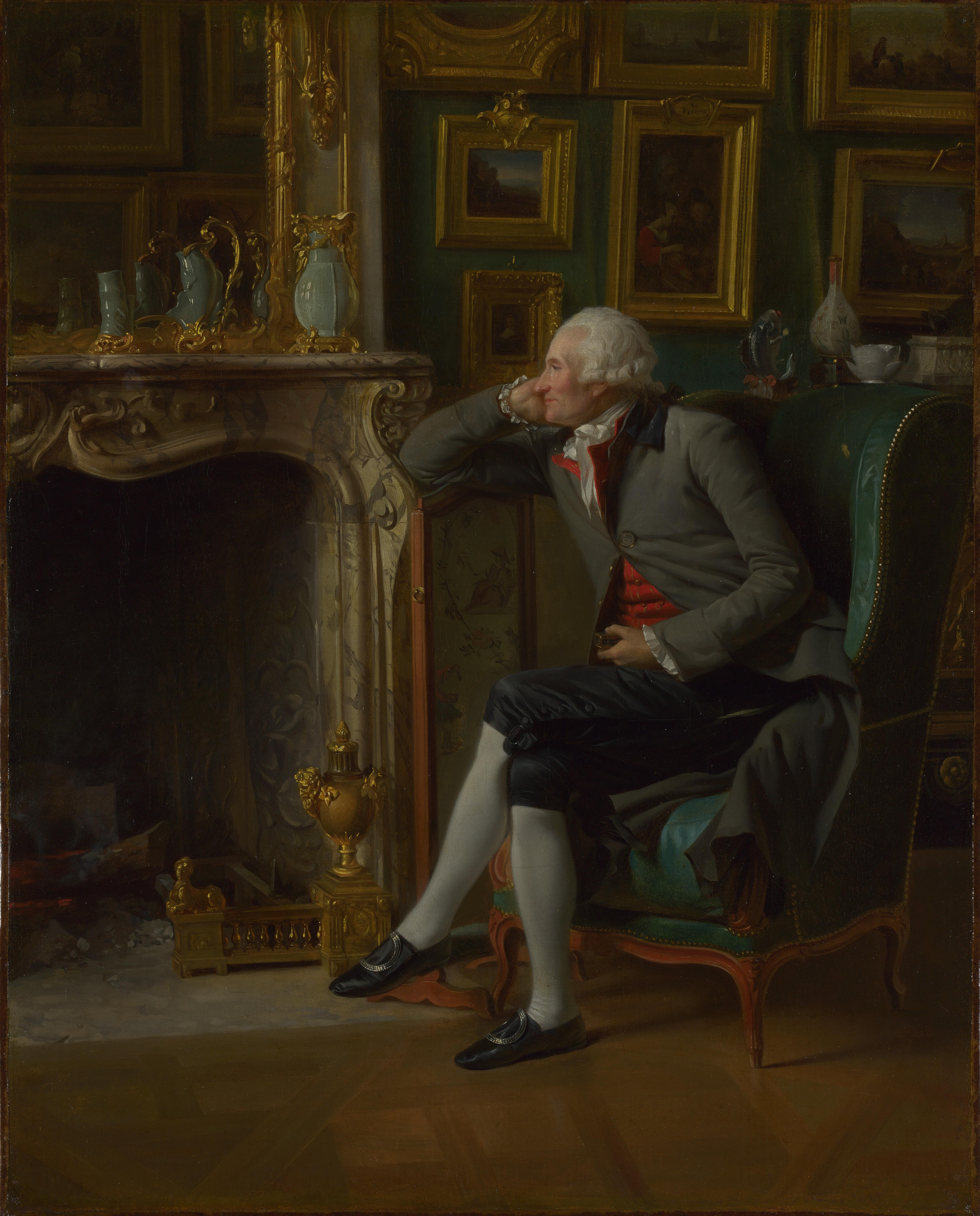
Le Baron de Besenval dans son salon de compagnie at the Hôtel de Besenval, the iconic portrait of Pierre Victor de Besenval by Henri-Pierre Danloux from 1791 (the year of the baron's death). The baron, seated in a wingback armchair, appears lost in thought. A preparatory drawing of this portrait shows the baron seated with his face and upper body turned towards the viewer instead of the profile view. By changing the pose from frontal to profile, Danloux focuses the attention less on the sitter himself and more on the objects in the room, putting not Besenval himself in the limelight but his passion as a collector. On 27 May 2004, this portrait of the baron was sold by Sotheby's in New York as lot 35 for US$ 2,472,000. Today, the portrait is part of the collections of the National Gallery, which acquired the painting from the London art market in 2004 for GBP 1,600,434.63 (from Daniel Katz Ltd and Simon Dickinson Ltd). This room, the Salon de compagnie, was probably lost over time during the various structural alteration works. However, there is speculation as to whether this room could be identical to the Salon de la tapisserie. If this is the case, the fireplace mantel and the parquet floor must have been replaced, since they no longer match the present-day situation.

Colin B. Bailey describes the iconic portrait Le Baron de Besenval dans son salon de compagnie as Henri-Pierre Danloux's "most accomplished Parisian portrait" and notes that this intimate picture "deserves to be known as the single oil painting produced in the 18th century of a French private collector in his picture cabinet." Humphrey Wine, curator of the 17th and 18th century French paintings at the National Gallery from 1990 to 2016, is equally enthusiastic and notes that "the sitter [Pierre Victor de Besenval] is commemorated as a collector in a portrait worthy of a collector." This painting was one of the few pieces not for sale at the auction in 1795. The baron's son Joseph-Alexandre Pierre, Vicomte de Ségur, kept his father's portrait in his possession until his death in 1805.

It was to be one last for both, Besenval and Danloux: Besenval died shortly after the portrait was completed in 1791 and for Danloux it was his last major portrait commission before he left France because of the turmoil of the French Revolution and emigrated to the United Kingdom.

Even today, most of the paintings which are visible in this portrait displayed against green damask can be identified. According to Colin B. Bailey, paintings of the following artists are visible: Cornelis van Poelenburgh, Willem van de Velde, David Teniers, Aelbert Cuyp, Claude-Joseph Vernet and Carlo Maratta. Also most of the other objects visible in the portrait can be identified and sometimes even traced back to their whereabouts, like the three pieces of green Chinese celadon porcelain mounted in gilt bronze and placed on the mantelpiece. Each of the three pieces has an identical pendant. The three pairs, together called the Baron de Besenval Garniture, were sold at auction on 8 July 2021 by Christie's in London in The Exceptional Sale in three lots (lots 4, 5 and 6) for a total of GBP 1,620,000.

Furthermore, some pieces of Japanese porcelain are visible on an armoire à hauteur d'appui, made in the style of André-Charles Boulle (one of a pair, made in contre-parti and almost certainly lots 186 and 187 in the baron's 1795 collection sale catalogue). Among the Japanese porcelain pieces on the armoire à hauteur d'appui are an Arita carp vase and a Kakiemon bottle. The beautifully crafted pair of ormolu chenets to the baron's feet (only one of the pair is visible) and the ormolu wall lights on either side of the mirror (only the lower part of the one on the right hand side is visible, showing a ram's mask on the back-plate) can be attributed to Philippe Caffieri and were probably made en suite to form a visual ensemble (two pairs of these wall lights are known: One at the Royal Palace of Stockholm and the other in a private collection).

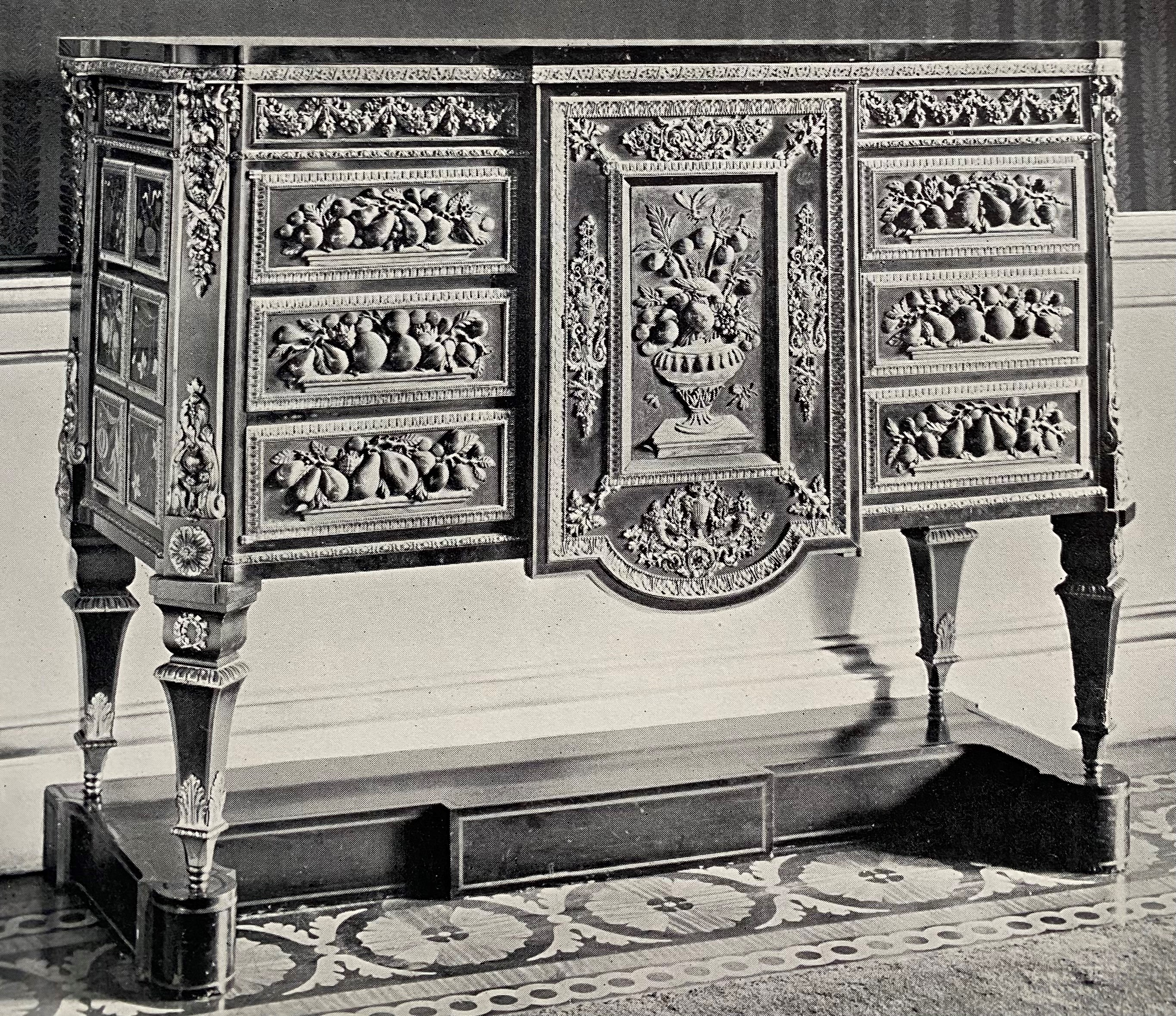
Once the most valuable piece of furniture at the Hôtel de Besenval: The Baron de Besenval's commode à vantaux from 1778 by Martin Carlin, almost certainly once commissioned by Dominique Daguerre. The first private owner of this commode was the Parisian opera singer Marie-Joséphine Laguerre (1755–1783). Some of the reused, probably once royal, 17th century pietra dura panels are signed by the Florentine lapidary Gian Ambrogio Giachetti. Pieces like this would fetch over a million euros at auction today. Photographed in the 1920s in the Green Drawing Room at Buckingham Palace.

The relations between the families de Besenval and Caffieri were close. Already the baron's father, Jean Victor de Besenval de Brunstatt (1671–1736), was a client of Philippe Caffieri's father, Jacques Caffieri. Jacques Caffieri had cast Jean Victor's bust in 1737, the same year that he had also created Jean Victor's funerary monument in the church of Saint-Sulpice. Both works were commissioned by Pierre Victor de Besenval. Two years earlier, in 1735, Jacques Caffieri had also cast the bust of Jean Victor's late father, Jean Victor P. Joseph de Besenval (1638–1713). The two busts were both shown at the exhibition L'Art Français sous Louis XIV et sous Louis XV which was held in Paris in 1888. At least one of these busts was part of the baron's collection. According to Louis Abel de Bonafous, Abbé de Fontenay (1737–1806), it was the bust that showed the baron's father and which he kept in his cabinet at the Hôtel de Besenval.

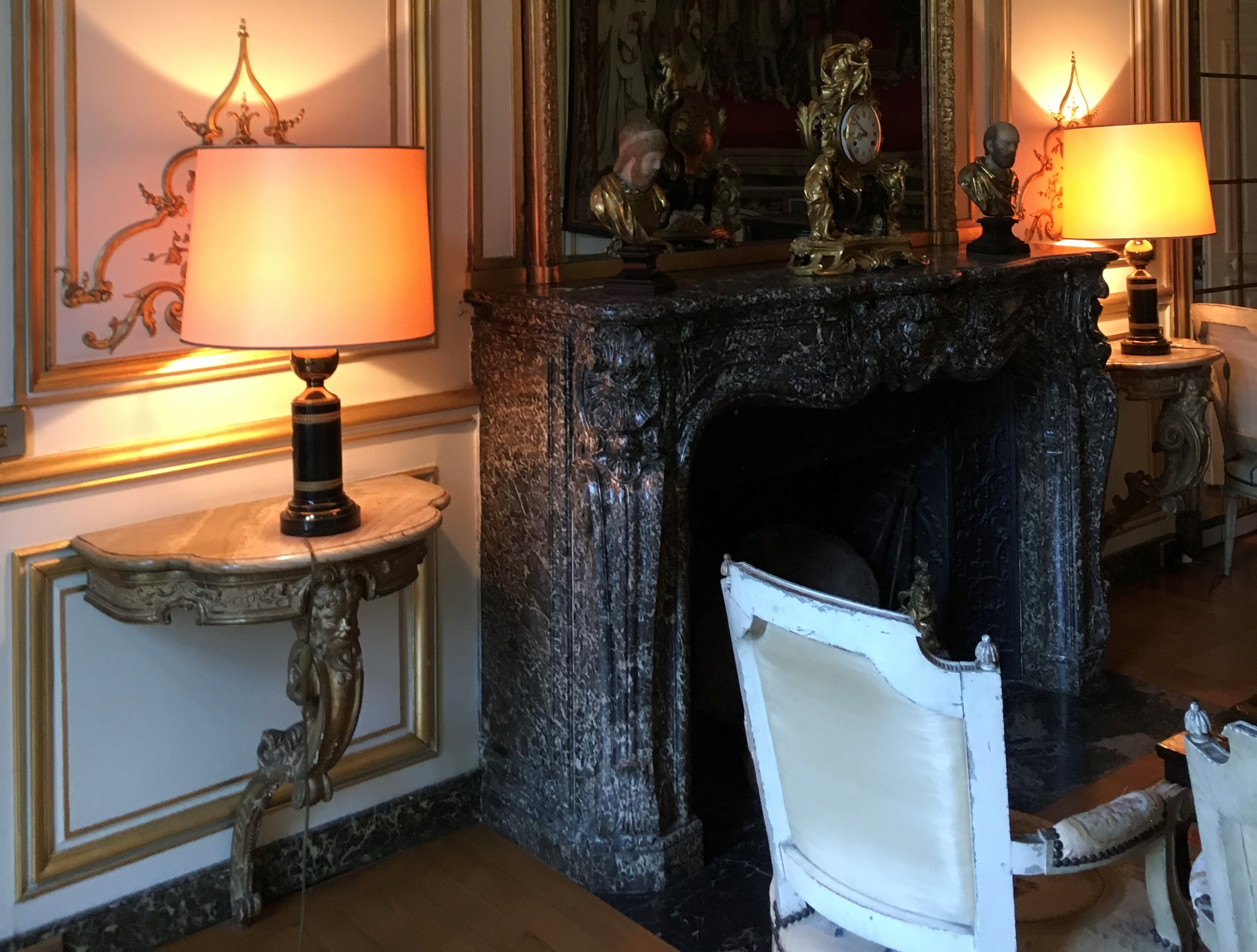
The fireplace mantel in the Salon de la tapisserie at the Hôtel de Besenval. Also visible is the backrest of one of the chairs from the baron's original furniture ensemble.

On the one hand, this shows the exquisite taste of the baron, whom Luc-Vincent Thiéry once called "homme de goût et de connaissances" (a man of taste and knowledge), and, on the other, the precision with which Henri-Pierre Danloux has executed this final portrait of Pierre Victor de Besenval.

Over the years, many of the baron's treasures have found new homes in world renowned museums or distinctive private collections. The most valuable piece of furniture in the baron's collection was a commode à vantaux made in 1778 by Martin Carlin in ebony inset with precious pietra dura panels, signed by Gian Ambrogio Giachetti, a Florentine lapidary who worked at the Gobelins Manufactory between 1670 and 1675. Today, this commode is part of the Royal Collection and is on display in the Green Drawing Room at Buckingham Palace. Other pieces found their way into the collections of the Louvre, the National Gallery, the Hermitage Museum, the Wallace Collection and the Metropolitan Museum of Art.

==== The Baron de Besenval's Salon de compagnie – reimagined after 230 years ====
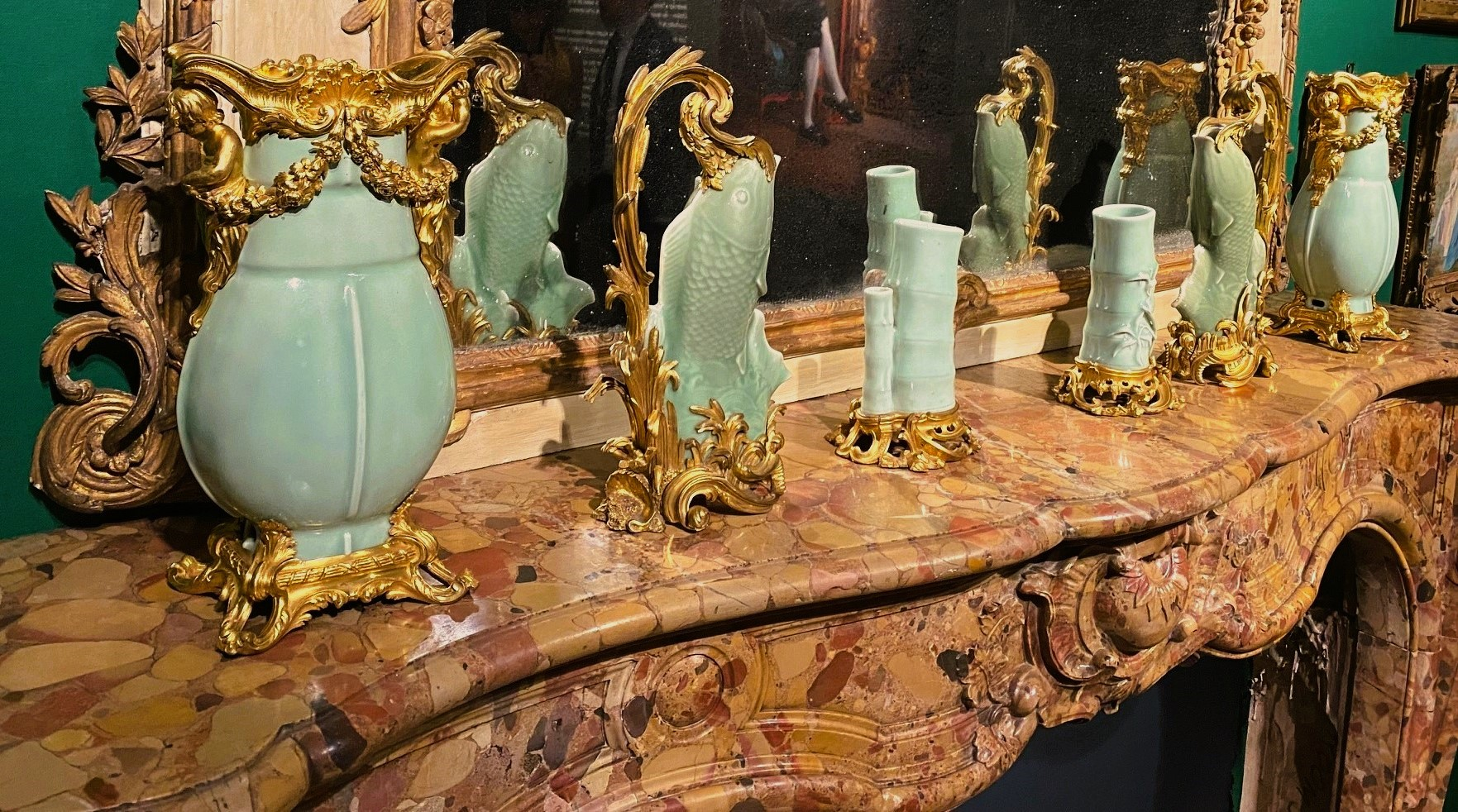
The Baron de Besenval Garniture at Christie's in Paris during the sales exhibition in 2025. The garniture was previously sold by Christie's in London in 2021 for GBP 1,620,000.

From 31 October to 18 November 2025, 230 years after the sale of the Besenval Collection on 10 August 1795, conducted by Alexandre Joseph Paillet, Paul Gallois, Head of European Furniture at Christie's, recreated the Baron de Besenval's Salon de compagnie in the premises of the auction house in Paris, at 9 Avenue Matignon, entitled: "Les Passions du Baron de Besenval – A salon reimagined." The display was part of a sales exhibition featuring some original works of art and furniture from the collection of the Baron de Besenval, amongst others the Baron de Besenval Garniture, the six-piece Chinese celadon porcelain garniture (three pairs), formerly on the baron's mantelpiece at the Hôtel de Besenval, and the Baron de Besenval's bureau plat, which, according to Luc-Vincent Thiéry, was originally placed in the baron's bedroom, the Chambre du maître. Both lots were previously sold by Christie's in London in 2021.

"This exhibition brings together magnificent 18th-century pieces reflecting the Baron de Besenval's taste for elegance, diplomacy and theatrical display."

— Paul Gallois, Head of European Furniture at Christie's

==== The Besenval era is coming to an end: The Comtesse de Moreton de Chabrillan ====
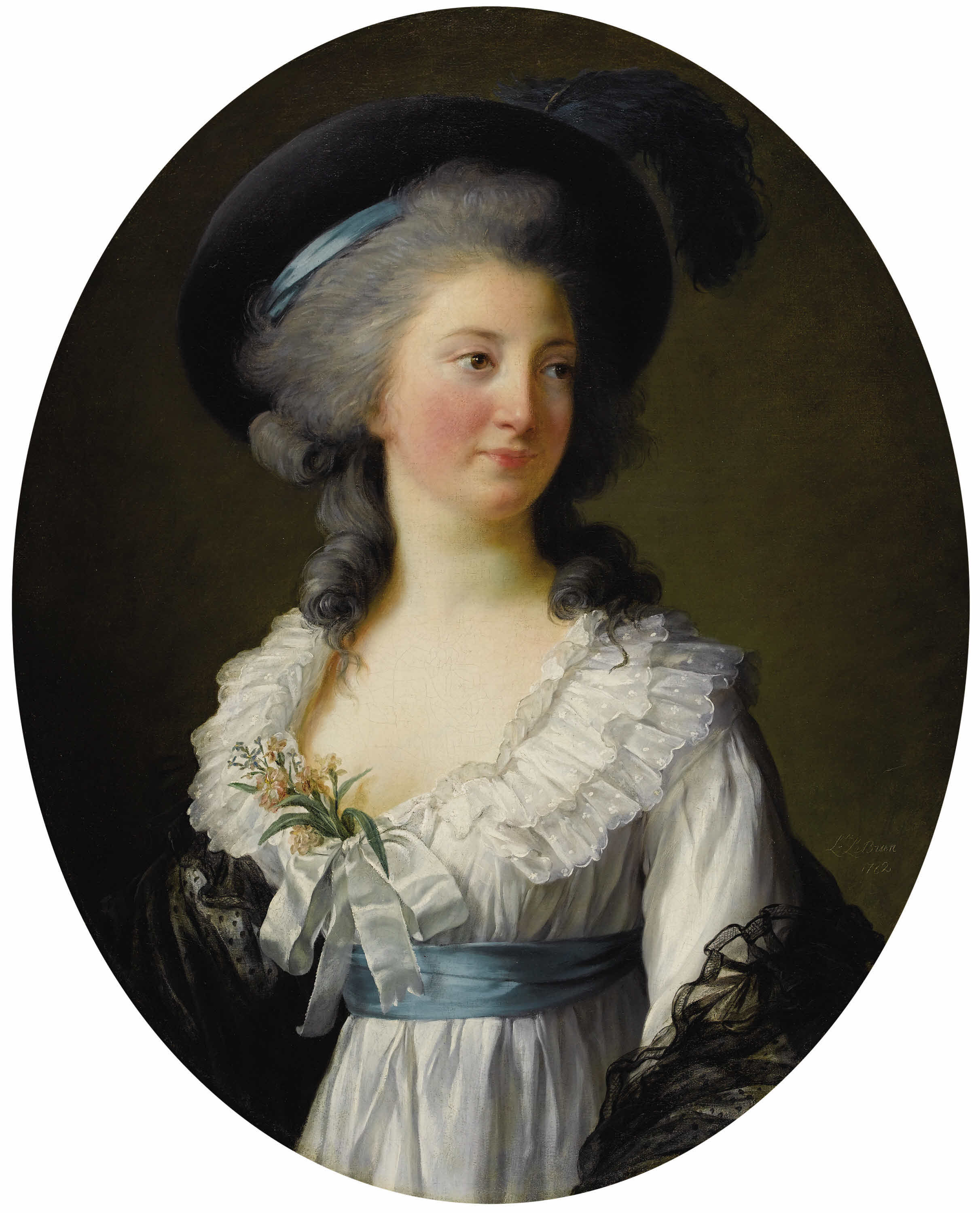
Bought the Hôtel de Besenval in 1797: The widow Marie-Elisabeth-Olive Guigues, Comtesse de Moreton de Chabrillan (1761–1807), heiress to the Château de Digoine in Palinges. The comtesse was portrayed by Élisabeth Vigée Le Brun in 1782.

Unlike the property and the fortune of the family de Ségur, the Hôtel de Besenval was exempt from expropriation by the revolutionary government since the former property of the Baron de Besenval was still considered Swiss-owned. In this context, it paid off for Joseph-Alexandre Pierre, Vicomte de Ségur, to ensure that, during the worst phase of the revolutionary turmoil, he was only perceived as executor of Pierre Victor de Besenval's will and not as his heir.

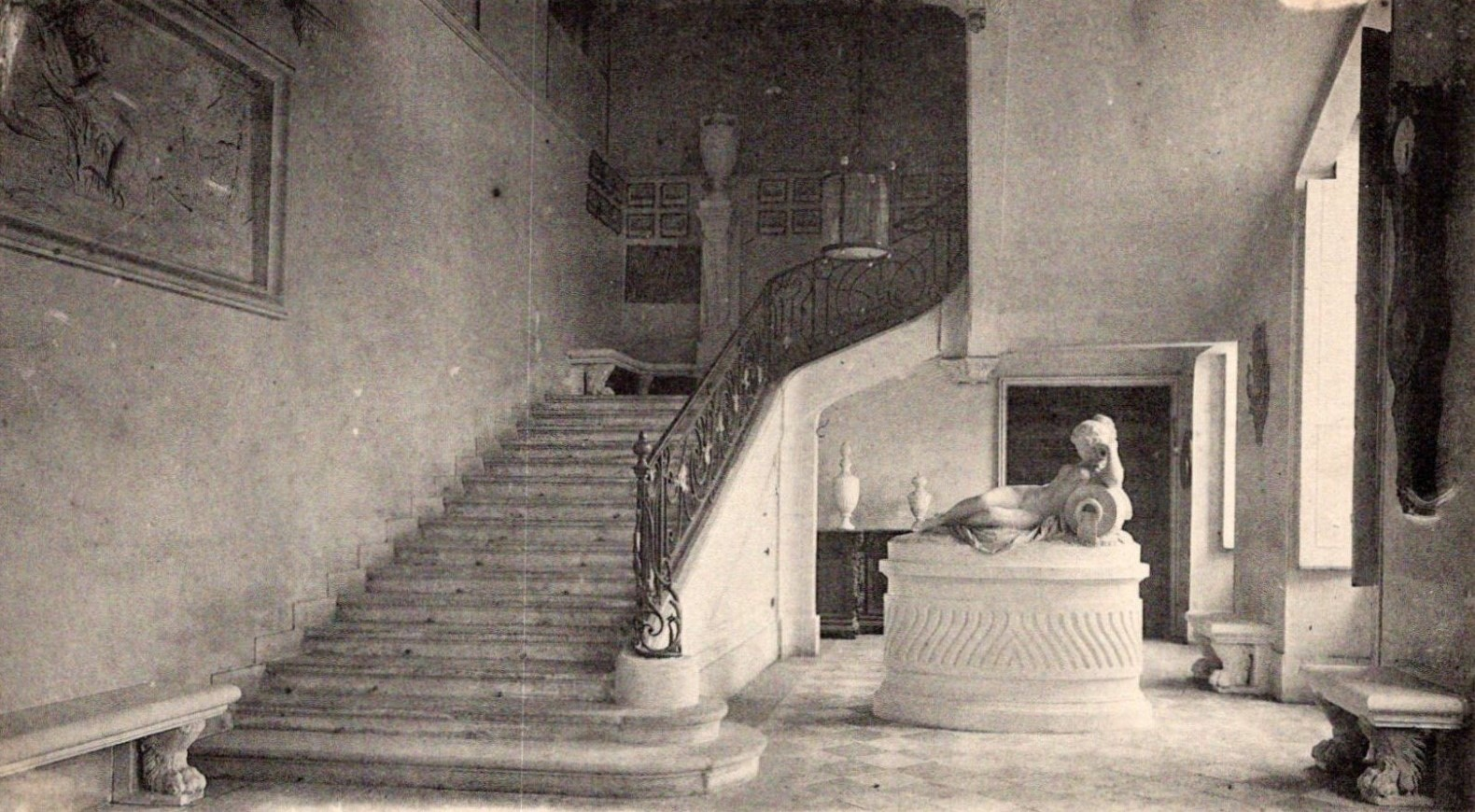
The entrance hall of the Château de Digoine as it appeared at the end of the 19th century. Visible are the following works of art by Claude Michel which he produced for the nymphaeum of the Hôtel de Besenval: The relief showing Pan pursuing Syrinx under de gaze of Cupid (embedded in the wall on the left), one of the four vases (on a pedestal column at the top of the stairs) and the masterpiece: The now considered lost larger-than-life naiad, called La Source, on her original oval-shaped pedestal (the pedestal has apparently been rotated 180 degrees so that the bronze gargoyle cannot be seen in this photo). The benches with paw feet were also part of the nymphaeum's furnishings, along with a pair of matching console tables with paw feet (the console tables are not visible in the photo, but like the benches they are still in the entrance hall of the Château de Digoine).

Already in 1780, the Baron de Besenval had bought a hôtel particulier on 6 Rue Chantereine for his son, the Vicomte de Ségur, or at least the baron financed his son's living there. The house was built by the architect François-Victor Perrard de Montreuil (1742–1821). This was the house where the Vicomte de Ségur lived with his then mistress Louise Julie Careau and which later became famous as the Hôtel Bonaparte. Philippe Henri, Marquis de Ségur, lived in the Hôtel de Ségur on 9 Rue Saint-Florentin. And when the Marquis de Ségur's house in Paris and his château in Romainville were later confiscated during the French Revolution, he withdrew to his country house, the Château de la Petite Roseraie in Châtenay-Malabry. Therefore, neither the Marquis de Ségur nor the Vicomte de Ségur had any intention of moving permanently to the Hôtel de Besenval. However, shortly after his father's death and the end of his relationship with Louise Julie Careau, the Vicomte de Ségur lived at the Hôtel de Besenval until his arrest on 13 October 1793, using it as the editorial headquarters for the monarchist newspaper Feuille du Jour, which he published together with the journalist Pierre-Germain Parisau and Jean-Baptiste-Denis Després, his father's former secretary. On 28 July 1794, the charges of counter-revolutionary pamphleteering against the Vicomte de Ségur were dropped, and he was subsequently released from Port-Libre prison. After his release, the Vicomte de Ségur resided in various properties of his partner, Reine Claude de Mesmes d'Avaux, Comtesse d'Avaux, née Chartraire de Bourbonne, Dame de Bourbonne-les-Bains (1764–1810), until his death in 1805.

On 30 October 1795, the Marquis de Ségur and the Vicomte de Ségur decided to let the Hôtel de Besenval to Francesco-Saverio, Conte di Carletti (1740–1803), the Minister of the Grand Duchy of Tuscany in Paris. But just two years later, on 5 May 1797, the Marquis de Ségur and the Vicomte de Ségur sold the Hôtel de Besenval to Marie-Elisabeth-Olive Guigues, Comtesse de Moreton de Chabrillan, née Frotier de La Coste-Messelière (1761–1807), widow of Jacques Henri Sébastien César Guigues, Comte de Moreton de Chabrillan, for FRF 35,000. The family of the comtesse also owned the Château de Digoine in Palinges. The comtesse's grandfather was Claude Léonor de Reclesne, Marquis de Digoine (1698–1765).

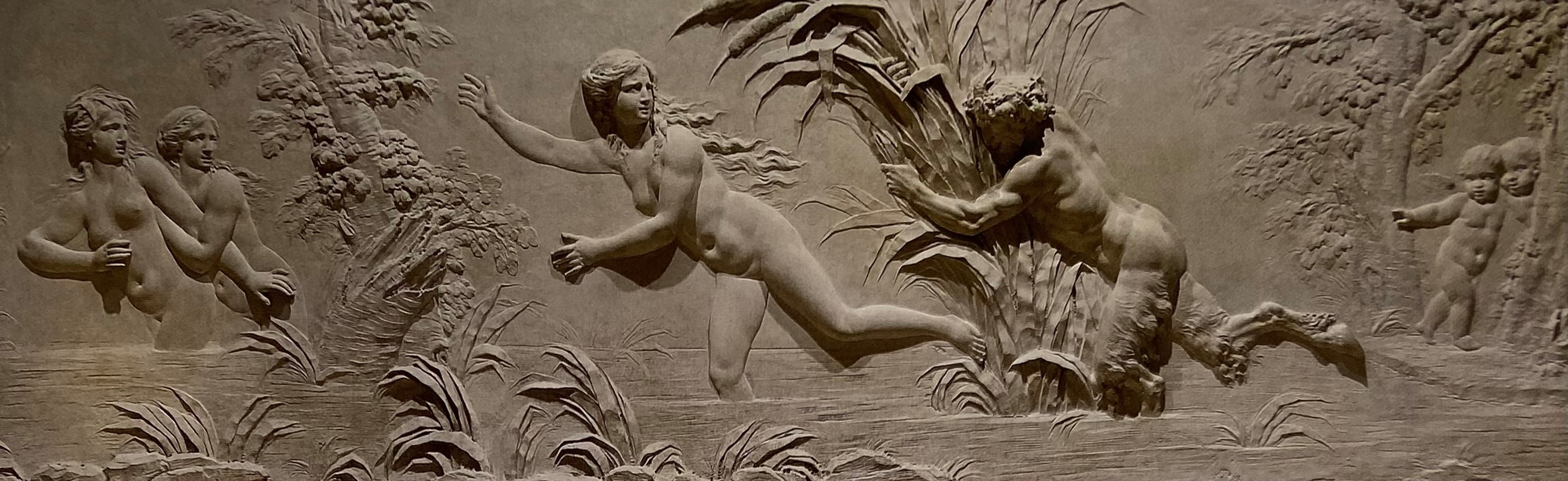
Relief I by Claude Michel, made for the nymphaeum of the Hôtel de Besenval: Pan pursuing Syrinx under de gaze of Cupid.

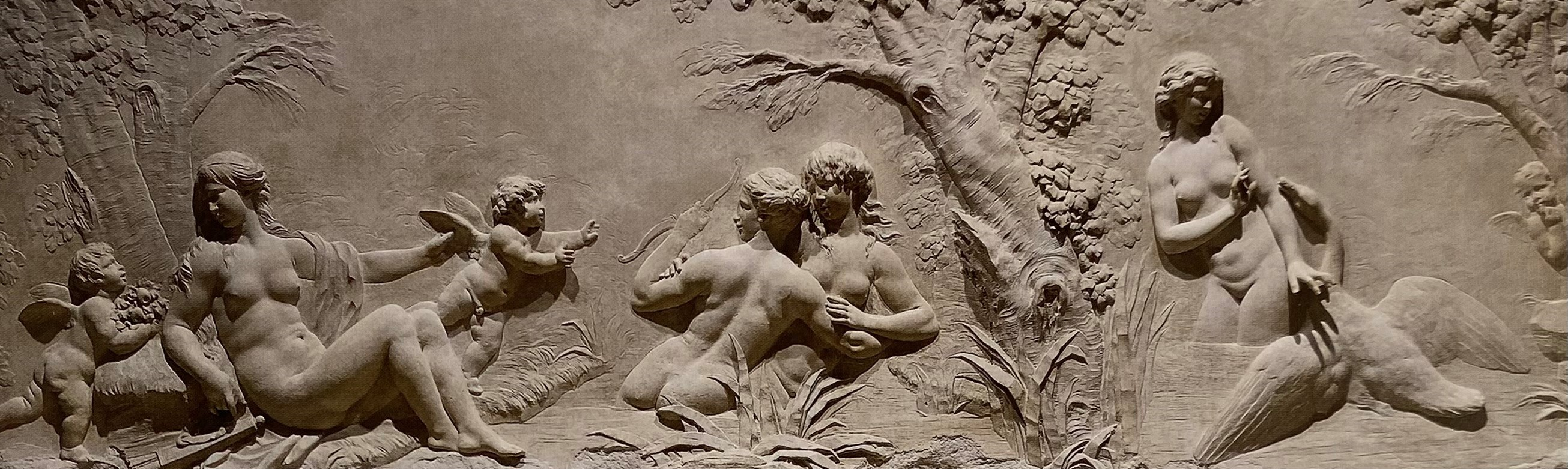
Relief II by Claude Michel, made for the nymphaeum of the Hôtel de Besenval: Venus and Cupid, (Salmacis and Hermaphroditus) and Leda and the Swan.

It was the son of the Comtesse de Moreton de Chabrillan Aimé Jacques Marie Constant Guigues, Comte de Moreton de Chabrillan, Chambellan to Emperor Napoleon by decree of 21 December 1809, whom Napoleon created Comte de l'Empire by letters patent of 19 January 1811, who, in 1822, brought all the decorative elements of the baron's nymphaeum to the Château de Digoine. He used them to adorn the entrance hall and the grand staircase of the château. One of the reasons for moving the works of art may have been that they were becoming increasingly damaged by the humidity in the nymphaeum at the Hôtel de Besenval. Most of these decorative elements were made by Claude Michel, such as the two reliefs depicting erotic scenes, which have been part of the collections of the Louvre since 1986 and 1987, respectively. These two reliefs were installed three times in different residences: First in the Hôtel de Besenval, then in the Château de Digoine (where they were each cut into two pieces and presented in four fragments) and then in the Hôtel de Sourdeval-Demachy, also called Hôtel de Wendel, (where they were again reassembled into two reliefs, back to their original size). When the reliefs finally became part of the Louvre's collections, they were extensively restored.

The family de Moreton de Chabrillan and their descendants kept the Hôtel de Besenval in their possession until 1925. In later years they also rented it out, including to members of the family Bonaparte.

==== The transformation of the Hôtel de Besenval and the arrival of the family Bonaparte ====
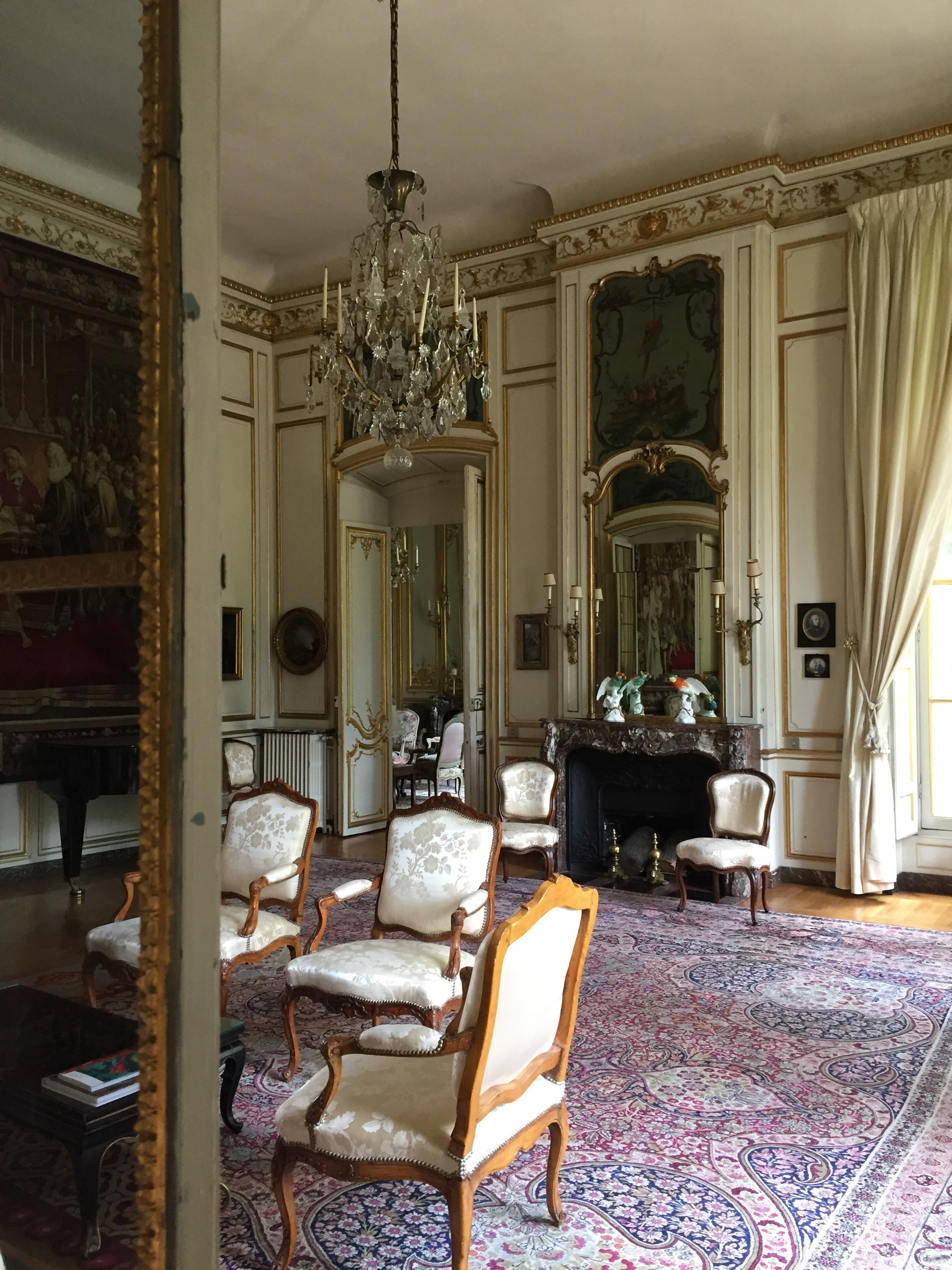
View from the Salon de la tapisserie, its mirrored doors opening onto the Salon des perroquets and further to the Salon des ministres (Chambre du maître). The Salon des perroquets takes its name from the parrot painting in the trumeau mirror above the fireplace and the parrot motifs in the overdoor paintings. These paintings were all installed in the last quarter of the 19th century. It was in this room, where the Baron de Besenval had gathered his guests for dinner on 16 March 1778 in the course of the affair: An Incident at the Opera Ball on Mardi Gras in 1778, including the Comte d'Artois, the Duc de Polignac and the Chevalier de Crussol.

It was in 1862 (construction plans dated 25 July 1862) and in 1866 (construction work carried out), at a time when the Hôtel de Besenval belonged to Marie Jacqueline Sidonie, Marquise de Montholon-Sémonville, née Guigues de Moreton de Chabrillan (1810–1890), daughter of Aimé Jacques Marie Constant Guigues, Comte de Moreton de Chabrillan, and her husband Louis François Alphonse, Marquis de Montholon-Sémonville, Prince d'Umbriano del Precetto (1808–1865), Chevalier de la Légion d'honneur, that the corps de logis was altered to its present appearance, following a design by the architect P. Chabrier. The house was enlarged with another floor and an attic with a comble à la Mansart.

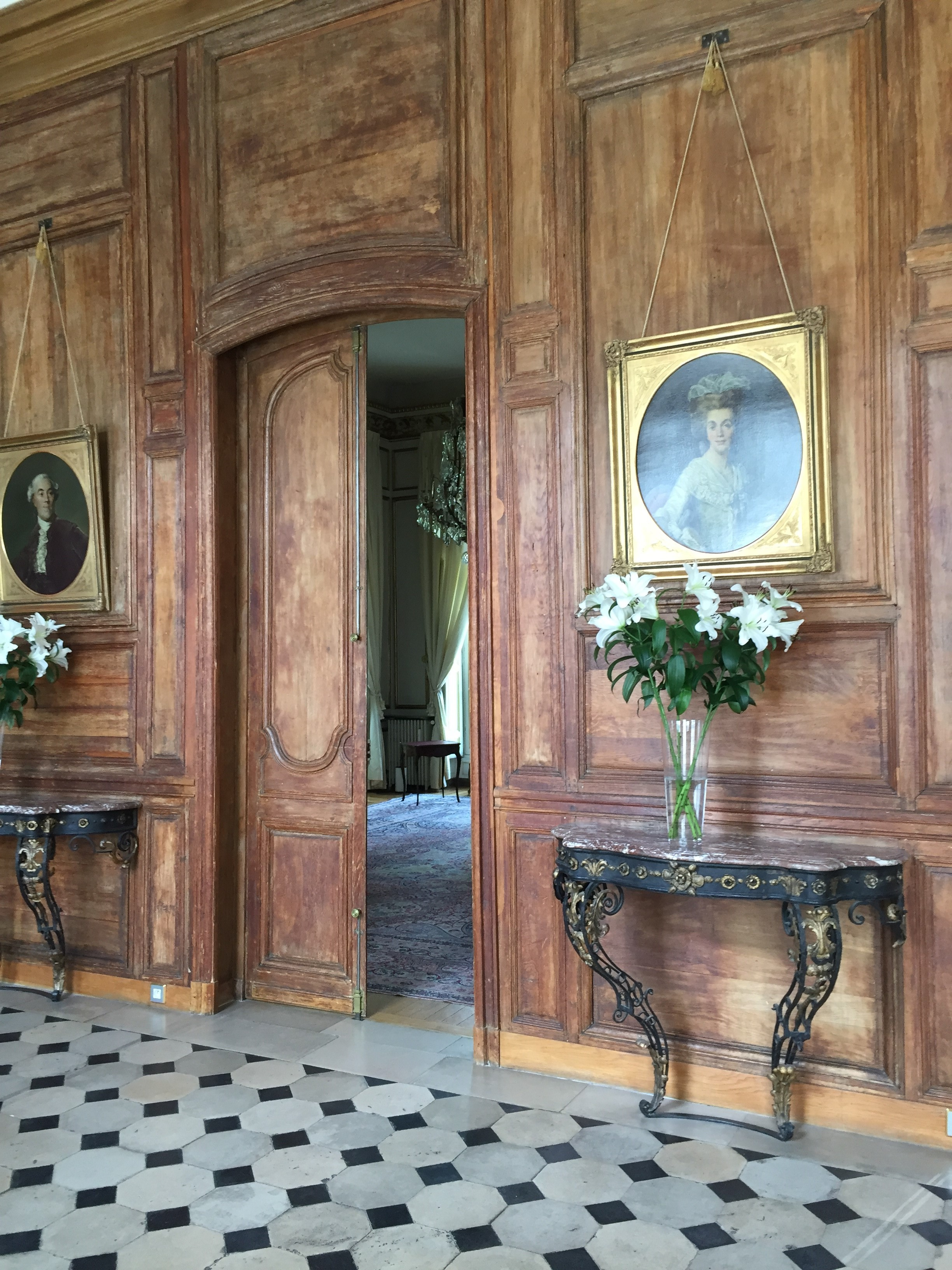
View from the vestibule, with its 18th-century wood panelling à la capucine, to the Salon des perroquets. To the left and right of the door are the portraits of Jacques Necker, who saved Besenval's neck, and his wife Suzanne Curchod. The wood panelling was originally painted. The pair of matching console tables was supplied by the Galerie Kraemer of Paris in 1968.

This construction work massively changed the external appearance of the single-storey residence. Whereas the corps de logis previously had the appearance and the architectural lightness of a maison de plaisance, the Hôtel de Besenval now changed its appearance to become a house with a certain severity and seriousness, a residence suitable for a family.

The family de Montholon was very close to the French imperial family, the House of Bonaparte. Charles Tristan, Marquis de Montholon, was a general under Emperor Napoleon and followed him into exile on 8 August 1815 on Saint Helena. Therefore, it doesn't come as a surprise that between 1855 and 1870 the Princes Lucien and Joseph Lucien Bonaparte, sons of Charles Lucien Bonaparte and therefore descdendants of Lucien Bonaparte, younger brother of Emperor Napoleon, resided at the Hôtel de Besenval.

It was also at the request of the family Bonaparte that the family de Montholon-Sémonville commissioned the extension of the building and the construction of the new suites of rooms on the first floor so that also other members of the family Bonaparte could temporarily stay at the Hôtel de Besenval, such as the Princesses Charlotte Honorine Joséphine Bonaparte (1832–1901) and Augusta Amélie Bonaparte.

Today, the ambassador's office and other offices and meeting rooms are located on the first floor. Part of the first floor also houses the ambassador's private quarters. The layout and the decoration of these rooms are rather simple compared to the state apartments on the ground floor.

=== Embassy of the Swiss Confederation (until 1957 as the Swiss Legation) ===
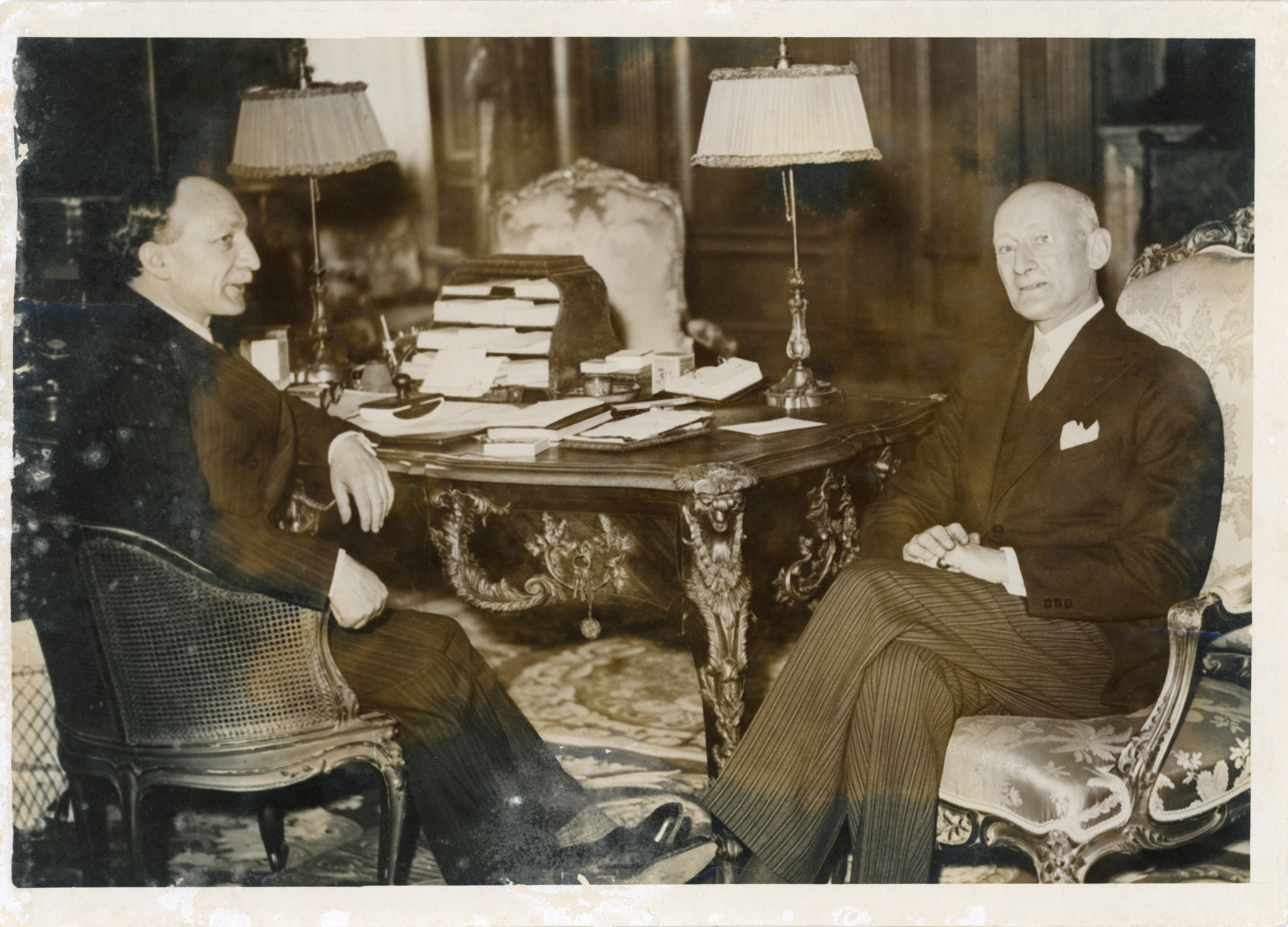
On the afternoon of 8 March 1938, Walter Stucki, the designated Envoy of the Swiss Confederation to France (right), and the French Foreign Minister Yvon Delbos (at his desk) met for talks in Delbos' office at the Ministry of Foreign Affairs. On this occasion, Stucki presented Delbos with a copy of his lettres de créance, which Stucki later presented to the President of the French Republic, Albert Lebrun. One of the topics of conversation that afternoon was the relocation of the Swiss Legation to the Hôtel de Besenval. A few days later, the world looked very different. On 10 March, the Government Chautemps IV under Prime Minister Camille Chautemps resigned and Delbos was no longer foreign minister. On 12 March, the Anschluss Österreichs took place. It was the eve of World War II.

During the second half of the 19th century, the Hôtel de Besenval became more and more of a revenue house. By 1909, the whole building was subdivided into apartments. Before World War I, most of the tenants were aristocrats. In the aftermath of World War I, parts of the Hôtel de Besenval served from 1936 to 1938 as the seat of various international arbitral tribunals established under the peace treaties. Years earlier, in 1925, Jean-Charles, Marquis de Montholon-Sémonville, Prince d'Umbriano del Precetto (1875–1954), sold the Hôtel de Besenval for FRF 3,000,000 to the public company Société immobilière Pompadour. At that time, the Marquis de Montholon-Sémonville lived in his family's Italian castle, the Castello di San Michele. He was a descendant of Marie-Élisabeth-Olive Guigues, Comtesse de Moreton de Chabrillan, who had purchased the Hôtel de Besenval in 1797. The majority shareholders of the Société immobilière Pompadour were Emily Grace Baumann, née Kinsley (1862–1951), an American heiress and widow of Gustav Baumann (1853–1914), a Swiss gentleman from St. Gallen, and her son, Clifton K. Baumann (1893–1936). However, Emily Grace Baumann and her son Clifton only lived in the Hôtel de Besenval temporarily between 1930 and 1931. The property continued to be occupied primarily by tenants until it was sold in 1938. One of the more illustrious tenants was George Bakhmeteff, the last tsarist Russian ambassador to the United States. One of the last tenants to leave the Hôtel de Besenval before it was taken over by the Swiss Confederation was the retired US ambassador Robert Peet Skinner, former US ambassador to Greece, Estonia, Latvia, Lithuania and Turkey.

==== Federal Councillor Giuseppe Motta's strategy ====
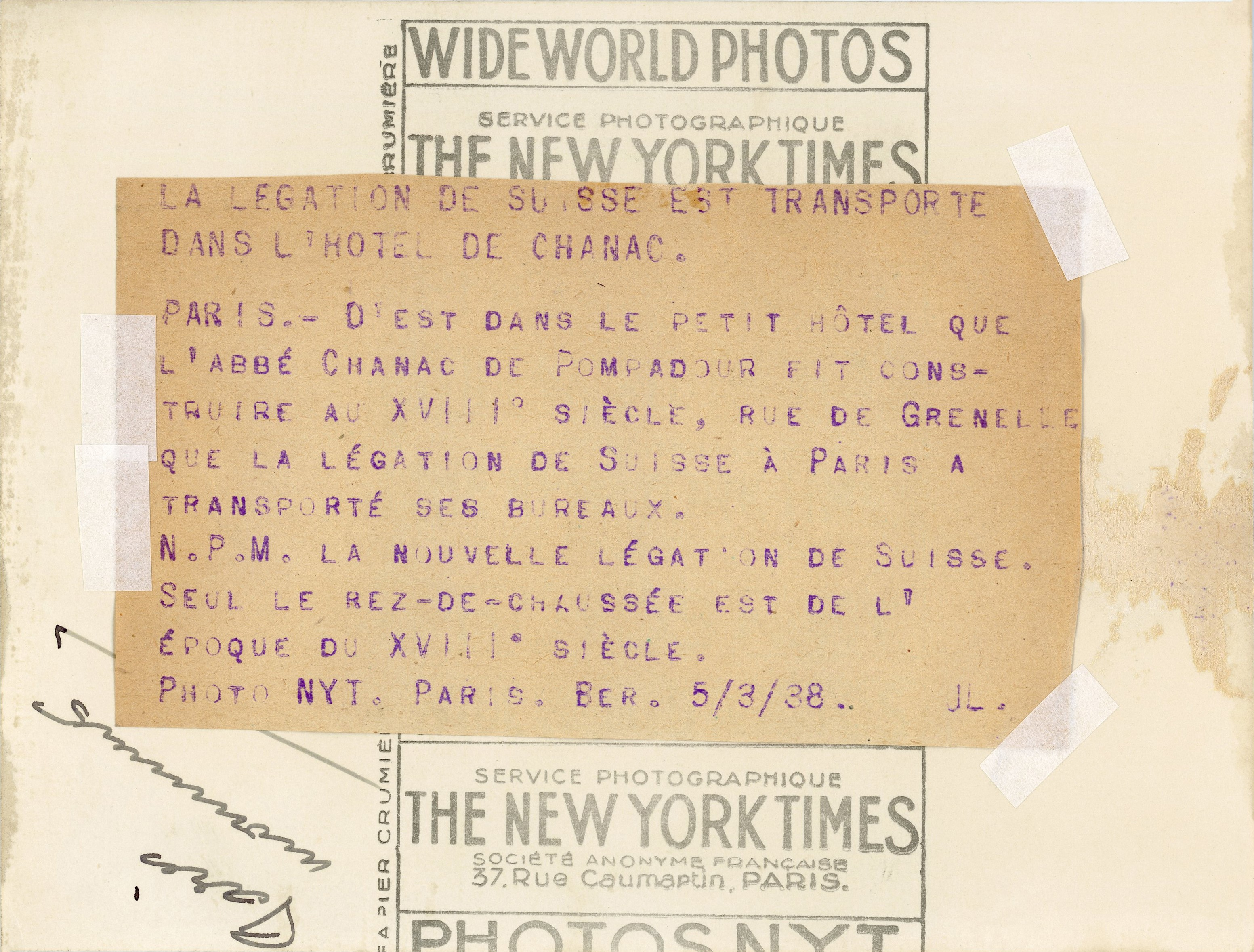
The relocation of the Swiss Legation to the Rue de Grenelle in 1938 made international headlines. At this time war was in the air and the international press was closely following what neutral Switzerland was doing. It was no surprise that The New York Times reported on the relocation of the Swiss Legation to the Hôtel de Besenval even before the notarial certification of the purchase of shares had taken place, as it was no secret among the diplomatic and the political circles that the purchase negotiations had been ongoing since 1937. First under the leadership of the Swiss envoy, Minister Alphonse Dunant, and then under his successor Minister Walter Stucki.

From the mid-1930s, the threat of war in Europe steadily increased. Accordingly, the Federal Council was concerned about the country's balance and independence. Therefore, the Swiss Foreign Minister Giuseppe Motta decided to strengthen Switzerland's presence in some important capitals. Part of this strategy was the plan to purchase representative legation buildings in strategically favorable locations, particularly in Paris, Rome and Washington (with the purchase of the Villa Kunheim in Berlin in 1919 and a mansion in London, this task had already been accomplished in these capitals).

When, after the death of Clifton K. Baumann in 1936, the Hôtel de Besenval was put up for sale in 1937, the Swiss Government did not hesitate. With its prime location, ideal size and storied Franco-Swiss past reflected in the life of Pierre Victor, Baron de Besenval, it seemed the perfect choice. In the same year, negotiations began between the Société immobilière Pompadour and the Swiss Confederation. Finally, on 19 May 1938, following the notarial certification of the purchase of shares, the Swiss Confederation acquired the Hôtel de Besenval for FRF 3,440,000 and relocated the Swiss Legation from its previous premises at 51 Avenue Hoche to 142 Rue de Grenelle. However, as the seller of the Hôtel de Besenval was a public company with multiple shareholders, the purchase was an ongoing process. The Swiss Confederation began acquiring shares as early as 1937. By May 1938, it had acquired all but two shares. Accordingly, the relocation of the Swiss Legation also took place in stages, beginning around March 1938.

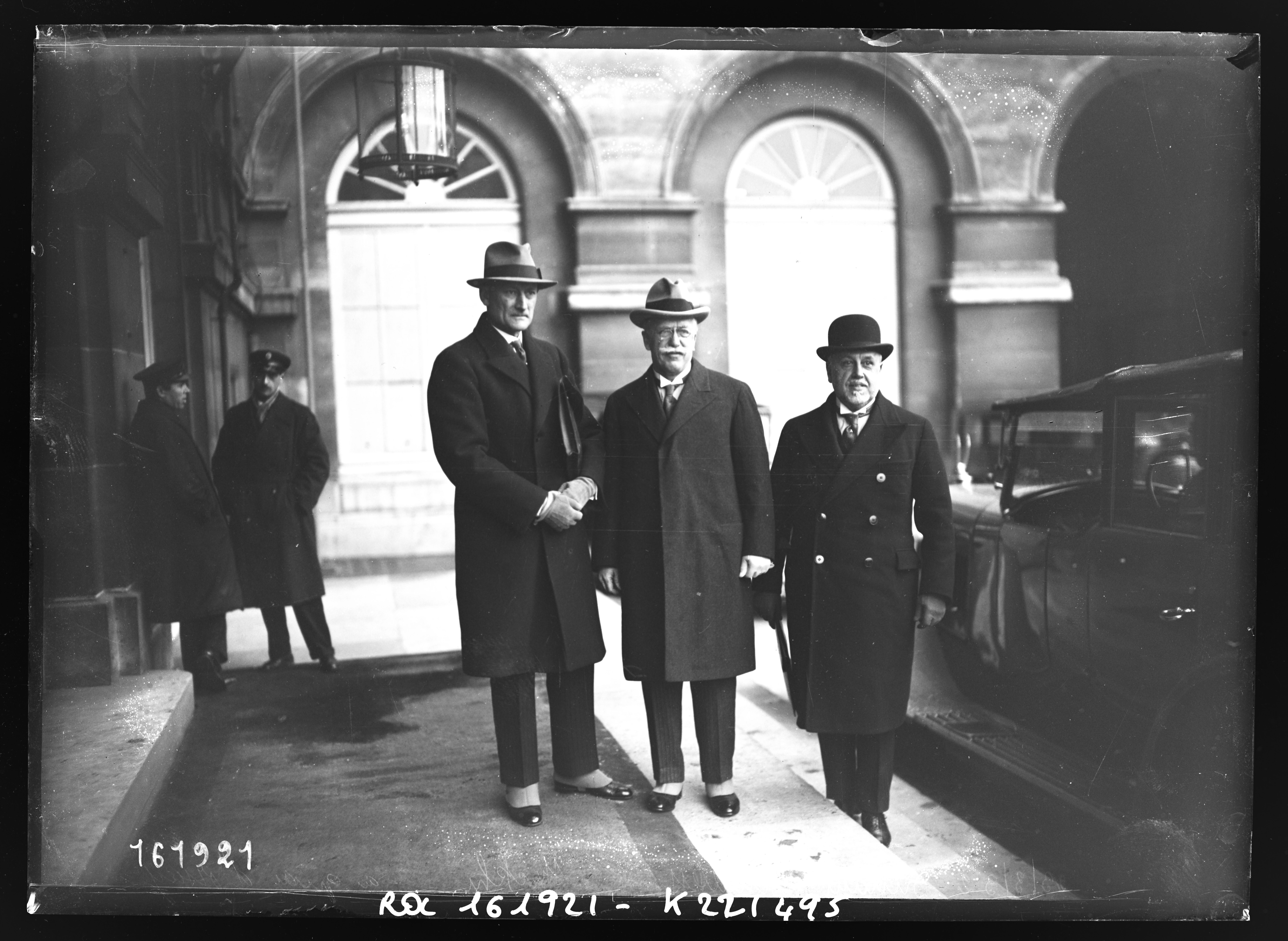
23 March 1932 – Quai d'Orsay: The two diplomats responsible for the purchase of the Hôtel de Besenval: The Swiss envoy, Minister Alphonse Dunant (right), and his successor Walter Stucki. In the middle: Federal Councillor Edmund Schulthess. In the background Minister Dunant's luxury car: An Avions Voisin.

When the Swiss Confederation bought the Hôtel de Besenval, the property was in rather poor condition. It was Minister Walter Stucki, Envoy of the Swiss Confederation to France, who was in charge for completing the purchase and the supervision of the serious renovation work of the existing buildings, as well as the addition of an administrative building bordering the west court, which replaced the former west wing with the kitchen and the servant's quarters. The work was planned and carried out by the architects Moreillon & Taillens. Later, between 1967 and 1969, the west wing was expanded to include a floor and an attic based on the model of the corps de logis. The aim was for all the renovations and extensions to form a harmonious architectural ensemble, based on the plans of Pierre-Alexis Delamair.

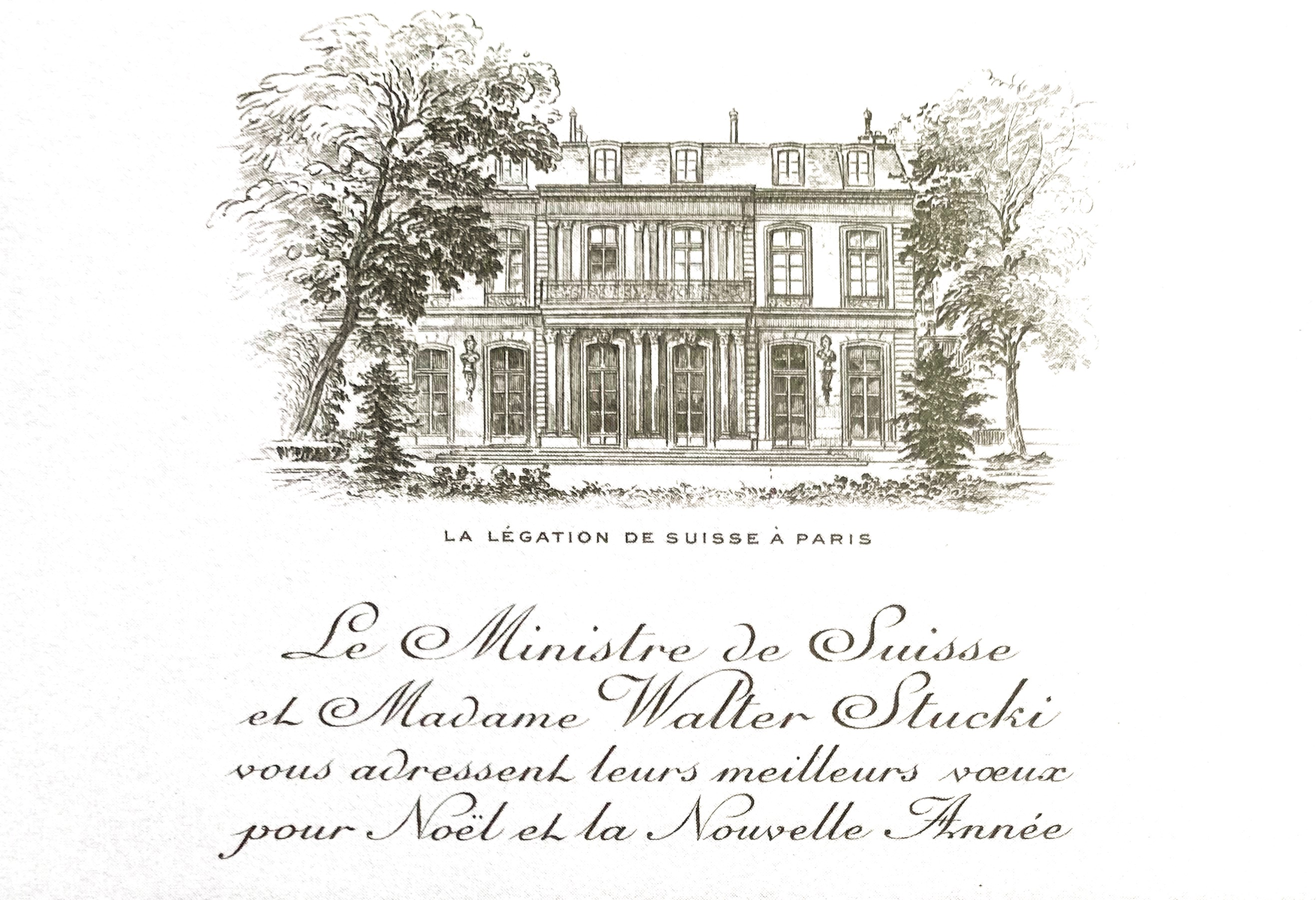
The first Christmas card featuring the Hôtel de Besenval (1938).

At the official opening of the new legation on 24 January 1939, Minister Walter Stucki and his wife Gertrud welcomed around 500 guests; a screening of Fusilier Wipf at the Maison de la Chimie preceded the reception at the Hôtel de Besenval. In order to meet the high expectations of his French and international guests, Walter Stucki was permitted to purchase silverware, porcelain and drinking glasses worth a total of CHF 5,000 at state expense.

A month earlier, in December 1938, Walter Stucki and his wife were able to move into the envoy's residence. However, the envoy couple were not able to enjoy the stately residence for long. A few months later, on 1 September 1939, World War II broke out.

==== World War II ====
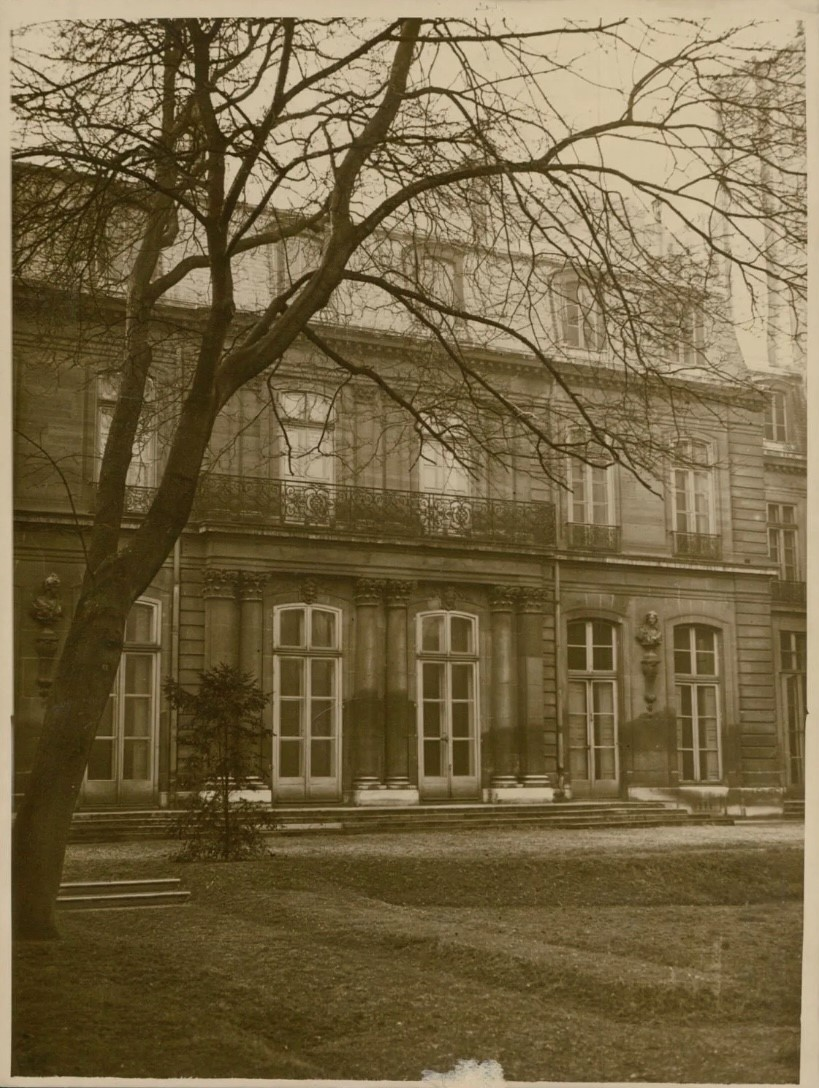
The garden façade of the Hôtel de Besenval in the winter of 1938. The year the Swiss Confederation bought the property.

From July 1940, after the Battle of France, the Capture of Paris and the Fall of the Third Republic on 22 June 1940, the legation in Paris served solely to represent the interests of Switzerland in Occupied France. De facto, the legation was downgraded to a consulate. However, the official downgrade did not occur until the summer of 1941 under pressure from Germany, when the Germans demanded that Switzerland no longer represents its interests in the territory of Occupied France from Paris, but from Berlin. But already in June 1940, Minister Walter Stucki, together with Legation Secretary Pierre Dupont (1912–1993) and Military and Air Attaché Colonel Richard de Blonay (1898–1968), as well as a large part of the French ruling elite, including Maréchal Philippe Pétain, who became prime minister on 16 June, had left Paris for Vichy. Meanwhile, Walter Stucki's deputy, Legation Councillor Henry de Torrenté, remained in Paris.

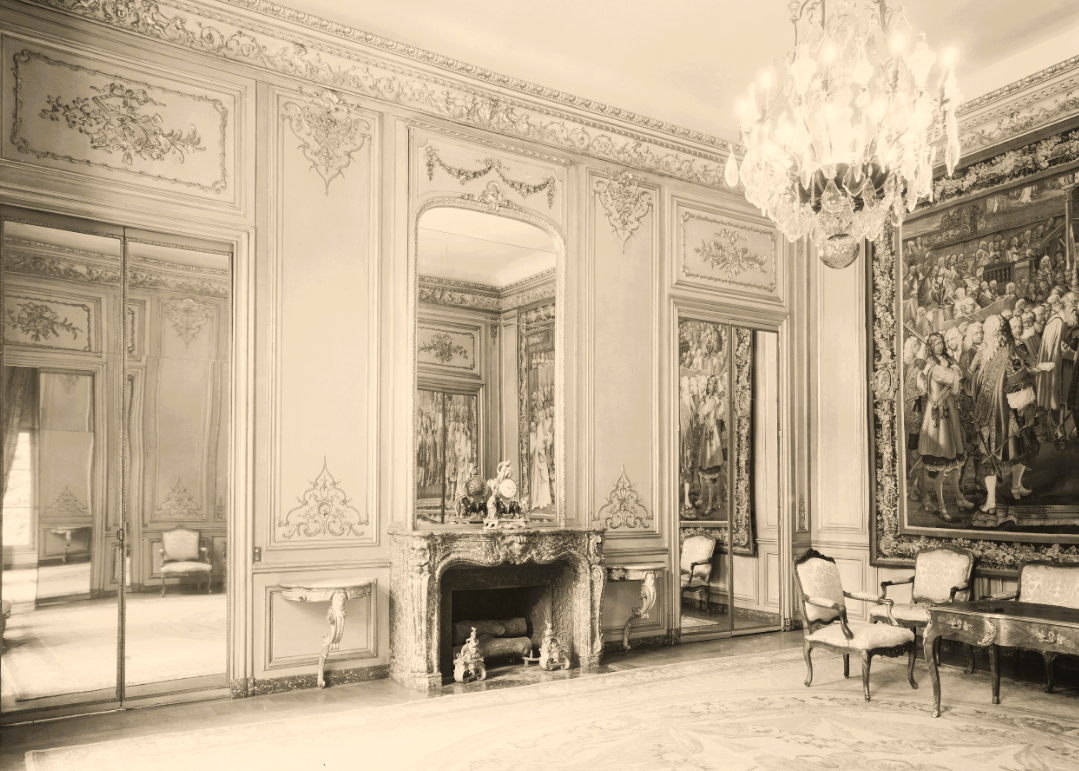
The Salon de la tapisserie of the Hôtel de Besenval as it was set up in the 1940s. The wood panelling largely dates from the second half of the 19th century. Only the overdoors likely date to the 18th century.

Shortly afterwards, Philippe Pétain took action. With a single sentence, he created a new executive power that effectively ended the Third Republic and founded the État français. He declared: "We, Philippe Pétain, Maréchal de France, declare, in accordance with the constitutional law of 10 July 1940, that we exercise the functions of Head of State of the État français (Chef de l'État français)." On 11 and 12 July, Pétain promulgated the first four constitutional acts, which granted him unlimited powers as head of state, with the exception of declaring war. These acts undermined the republican principle of separation of powers and replaced popular sovereignty with the personal authority of Maréchal Philippe Pétain. Walter Stucki recognised the seriousness of the situation and sought contact with Pétain.

In the course of time, Stucki gained Pétain's trust. And on 20 August 1944, Pétain took Stucki to his private apartment at the Hôtel du Parc as a witness to prove that he was evacuated by the Germans against his will to Belfort. Stucki mediated between the advancing Allies, the withdrawing Germans and the French Resistance fighters and saved Vichy from destruction. The grateful city government of Vichy made Stucki an honorary citizen and named a street after him, the Avenue Walter Stucki.

==== A place – reminiscent of the great diplomatic missions: The ambassadors Burckhardt and Soldati ====
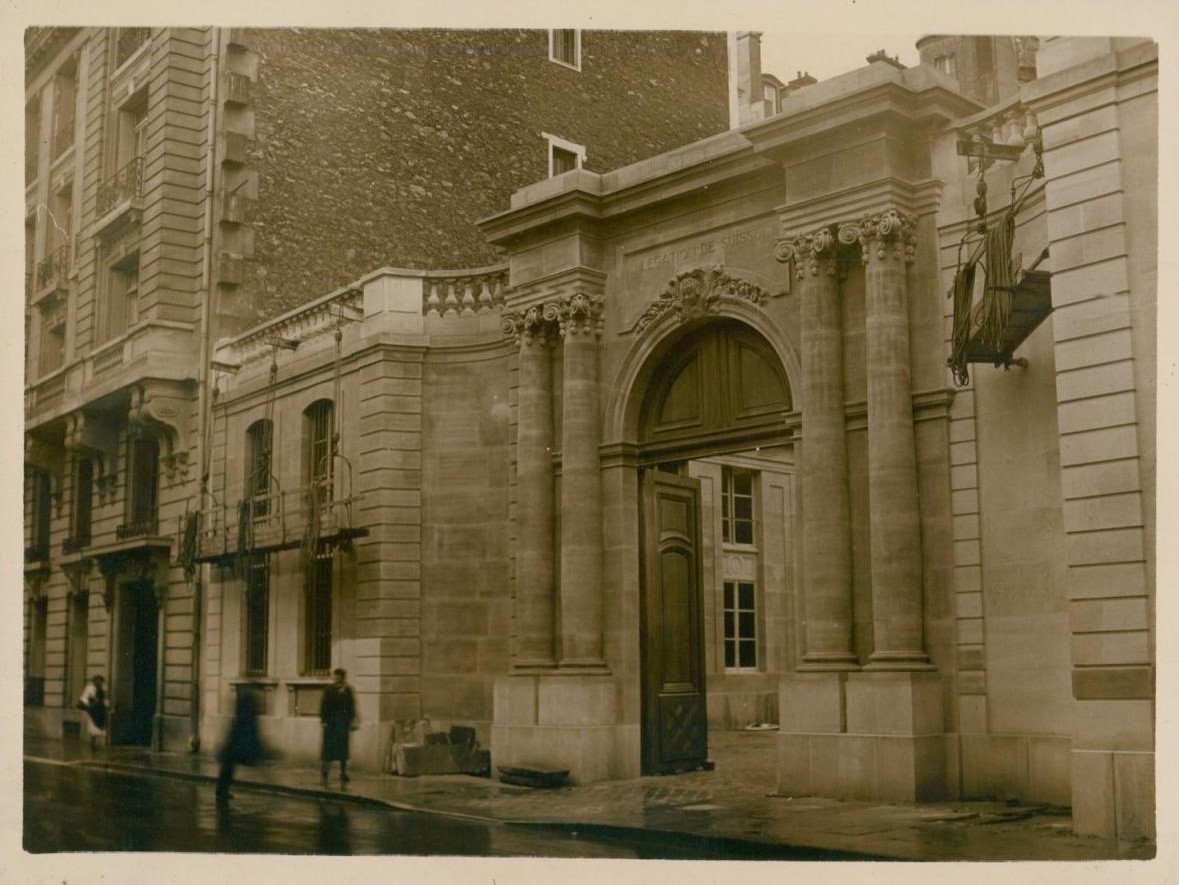
The main entrance of the Hôtel de Besenval around 1939. The new monumental entrance portal, designed by the architects Moreillon & Taillens based on the design of the entrance portal of the Hôtel de Soubise, has already been completed. The inscription Légation de Suisse was later removed when the legation was upgraded to an embassy in 1957.

After the war and with the arrival of Minister Carl J. Burckhardt, the Hôtel de Besenval once again became the Swiss Legation and social life returned to the residence on the Rue de Grenelle. On 25 March 1947, Carl J. Burckhardt welcomed a group of friends well-known in the arts at his residence. Amongst others there were: Marie-Laure de Noailles, Louise Lévêque de Vilmorin, Nora Auric (1900–1982), Robert de Saint-Jean, Christian Bérard and Jacques Février. Diplomacy was finally able to devote itself again to its actual task: Maintaining and intensifying bilateral relations.

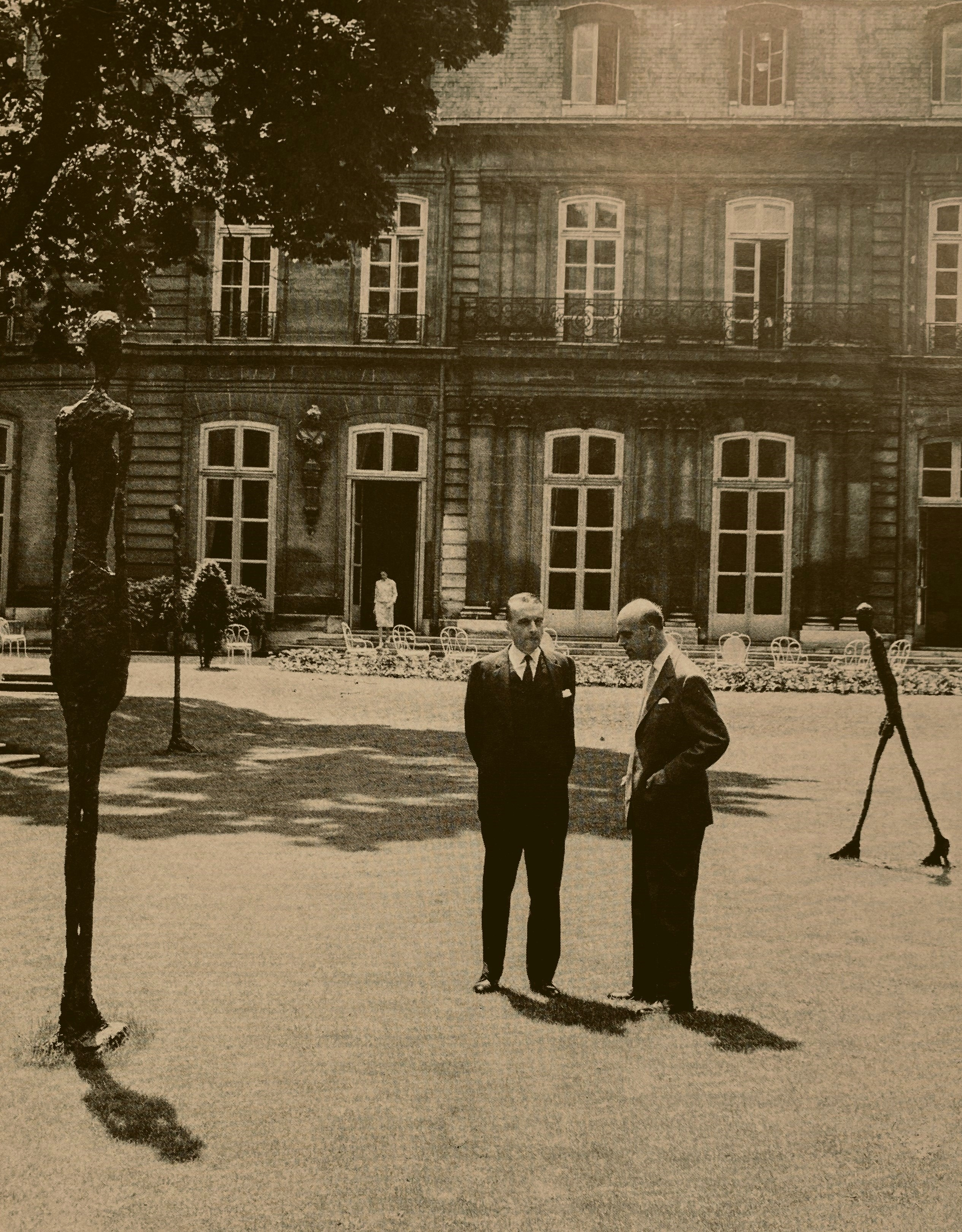
Ambassador Agostino Giorgio Soldati (left) and Cultural Attaché Bernard Barbey in the garden of the Hôtel de Besenval, surrounded by Alberto Giacometti's sculptures during the exhibition in 1963. In the back in the doorway the ambassador's wife Marguerite Daisy Soldati-Thome, Comtesse de Contades (1907–2001). Her wealth and influence benefited her husband's work. She was friends with Charles de Gaulle, André Malraux, Alain Poher and René Pleven.

From 1961, with the arrival of Ambassador Agostino Giorgio Soldati and his rich and influential wife Marguerite Daisy Soldati-Thome, Comtesse de Contades (1907–2001), daughter of André Thome and sister of Jacqueline Thome-Patenôtre, the Hôtel de Besenval became the centre of the international Parisian diplomatic society. The ambassador and his wife hosted lavish parties and entertained on a grand scale: In Paris at the Hôtel de Besenval, in Switzerland at their country estate in Aubonne, the Château de Trévelin. Marguerite Daisy Soldati-Thome had purchased the Château de Trévelin in 1958 from the banker Édouard Bordier (1874–1957), partner of Bordier & Cie, and, after his death during the transaction, from his heirs, respectively.

In 1963, Ambassador Agostino Giorgio Soldati and Cultural Attaché Bernard Barbey achieved a cultural coup: A major exhibition by the artist Alberto Giacometti in the garden of the Hôtel de Besenval. Ambassador Soldati and his wife welcomed tout-Paris to the exhibition, including Hubert de Givenchy. From 1986, Hubert de Givenchy's residence in Paris was the Hôtel d'Orrouer, which is also located on the Rue de Grenelle, not far from the Hôtel de Besenval. Hubert de Givenchy was a passionate collector of works by Alberto Giacometti and his brother Diego Giacometti. Amongst others, Hubert de Givenchy owned the sculpture Femme qui marche by Alberto Giacometti, which he kept in his salon at the Hôtel d'Orrouer.

In his later years, Alberto Giacometti's works were shown in a number of large exhibitions throughout Europe. The popularity was such that it was decided to show the exhibition also at the Museum of Modern Art in New York in 1965. Alberto Giacometti attended the exhibition personally, despite his declining health.

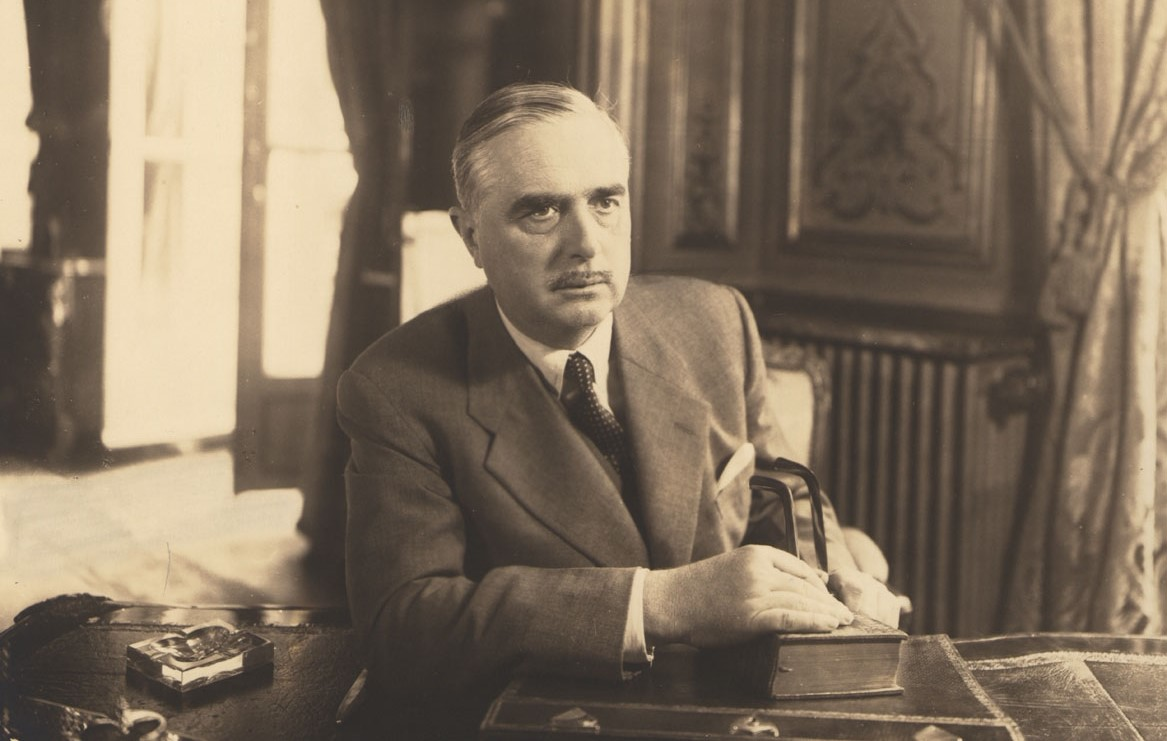
The last League of Nations High Commissioner for the Free City of Danzig, Minister Carl J. Burckhardt, Envoy of the Swiss Confederation to France from 1945 to 1949, at his desk in the Salon de la tapisserie at the Hôtel de Besenval in 1945. He simultaneously served as the President of the ICRC. In 1954 he was awarded the Friedenspreis des Deutschen Buchhandels.

The post-war years up until the 1980s were the last years of the gentlemen diplomats. They were a generation of mainly pre-war diplomats with privileged backgrounds who, because of their financial independence, viewed their profession as an appointment rather than a job. Two of the most outstanding heads of mission of this era who left their mark on the Hôtel de Besenval were Carl J. Burckhardt and Agostino Giorgio Soldati.

The importance of the Hôtel de Besenval as a place for Franco-Swiss encounters has become apparent again and again throughout history. On 20 December 1966, Gaston Palewski, Président du Conseil constitutionnel, delivered the funeral eulogy for Ambassador Agostino Giorgio Soldati. He recalled, in particular, Soldati's elegance, excellent taste, diplomatic skill and legendary hospitality – qualities that led Charles de Gaulle, Président de la République Française, to call him "le grand ambassadeur et l'ami de la France":

"The Hôtel de Besenval, the beautiful Swiss Embassy in Paris, rejuvenated and decorated with exquisite taste, had become a popular and much-loved venue, reminiscent of the great diplomatic missions once known in Paris – those of Lord Tyrell, William Bullitt, Duff Cooper and Carl J. Burckhardt."

— Gaston Palewski, Président du Conseil constitutionnel

==== The Hôtel de Besenval: In the service of Franco-Swiss diplomacy – already in Besenval's time ====
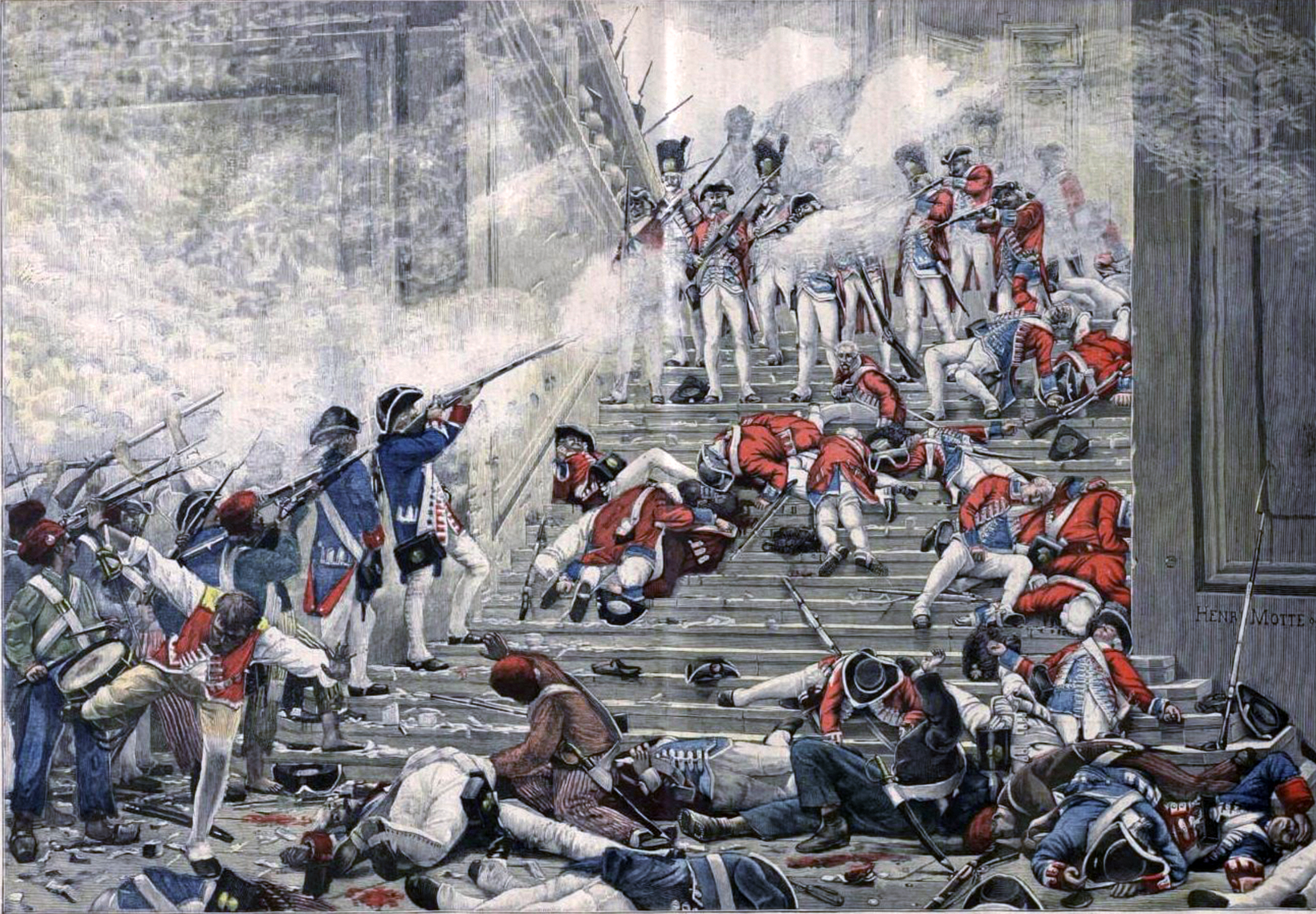
Loyal to the End: The Massacre of the Swiss Guards (in red uniform coats) during the Storming of the Palais des Tuileries on 10 August 1792. It is estimated that up to 700 Swiss Guards were killed. The Lion Monument was erected to commemorate their sacrifice. The Swiss Guards were assigned to the direct protection of the sovereign and his residences and were also custodians of the King's Seals and the French Crown Jewels. After the conflict surrounding the Storming of the Palais des Tuileries, the revolutionary government lost confidence in the royalist Swiss Guards and disbanded them on 20 August 1792.

The first permanent diplomatic representation of the then Helvetic Republic in France was opened in April 1798. Head of this worldwide first ever official permanent Swiss diplomatic representation was the Envoy Peter Josef Zeltner from Solothurn. This was the beginning of a long line of Swiss ambassadors to France.

However, long before this, individual Swiss cantons of the Old Swiss Confederacy were well aware of the need to have their interests represented at the powerful French royal court. Under the Ancien Régime, such tasks were either entrusted to special envoys or carried out through established networks by trusted individuals already on site, such as officers of the Swiss Guards, including Pierre Victor de Besenval, and for good reason: The officers of the Swiss Guards wielded considerable influence at court. Alain-Jacques Tornare (* 1957) describes their status as follows: "Swiss soldiers in France were not mercenaries, but effectively an army within the army. In a broader sense, the Swiss community in France formed a state within the state. The kings showered the Swiss with privileges such as tax exemptions, legal rights and freedom of religion, so that they enjoyed greater privileges than the French themselves." The Swiss expressed their gratitude to the kings by affirming their steadfastness and loyalty to The Crown. In summary, Tornare says about the importance of the Swiss Guards: "A pillar of France's Ancien Régime and a symbol of Swiss know-how."

"Switzerland had to have a place in Paris that reflected the importance, the friendship and the density of relations between the two countries."

— Ambassador Edouard Brunner on the importance of the Hôtel de Besenval for Swiss diplomacy

==== State apartments: Representation and film location ====
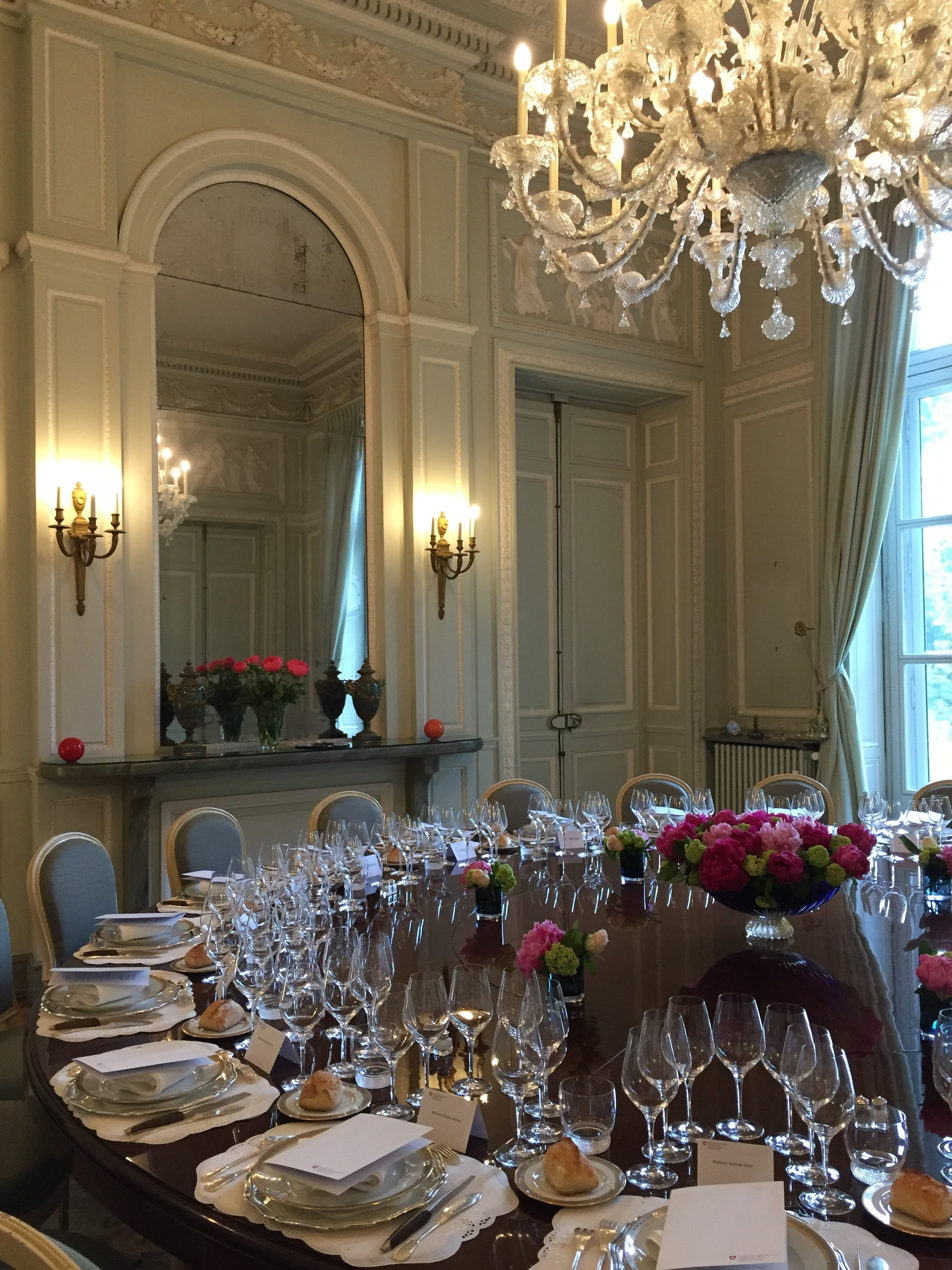
It was in 1782, when the architect Alexandre-Théodore Brongniart transformed the Grand cabinet at the Hôtel de Besenval into what was then a novelty: A dining room in the neoclassical style, painted in mint green and decorated with overdoor reliefs imitating the decorative style of Pompei and Herculaneum. One showing the Dance of The Bacchae, the other the Toilette of Venus. The Baron de Besenval can be regarded as a pioneer of what is now known as gastrodiplomacy. Like his contemporary Charles Maurice de Talleyrand-Périgord, Prince de Benevento et de Talleyrand, the baron believed that the way to successful diplomacy is through the stomach. Famously, Charles Maurice de Talleyrand-Périgord is reputed to have told Napoléon: « Sire, j'ai plus besoin de cuisiniers que de diplomates ! »

The layout and the decoration of the vestibule and the state apartments – the Salon de la tapisserie, the Salon des perroquets, the Salon des ministres (Chambre du maître) and the adjoining boudoir, as well as the dining room – have changed little since the time of the Baron de Besenval, when he received tout-Paris – including royalty – at the Hôtel de Besenval. The designs of the architects Pierre-Alexis Delamair and Alexandre-Théodore Brongniart are still predominant, especially when it comes to wood panelling, although later revisions and additions were made in the corresponding styles. During the time of the Baron de Besenval, wood panelling was less dominant in some of the state apartments, except in the dining room. The wall sections between the wainscoting, trumeau mirrors and overdoors were covered in damask. Even today, the rooms are still decorated in the styles of their time: Régence, Louis XV, Louis XVI and Neoclassicism.

"I shall come to your house for dinner, and you may be assured it will give me the greatest pleasure."

— Charles-Philippe de France, Comte d'Artois, the future King Charles X, accepting the Baron de Besenval's inviation for dinner on 16 March 1778 at the Hôtel de Besenval in the course of the affair: An Incident at the Opera Ball on Mardi Gras in 1778

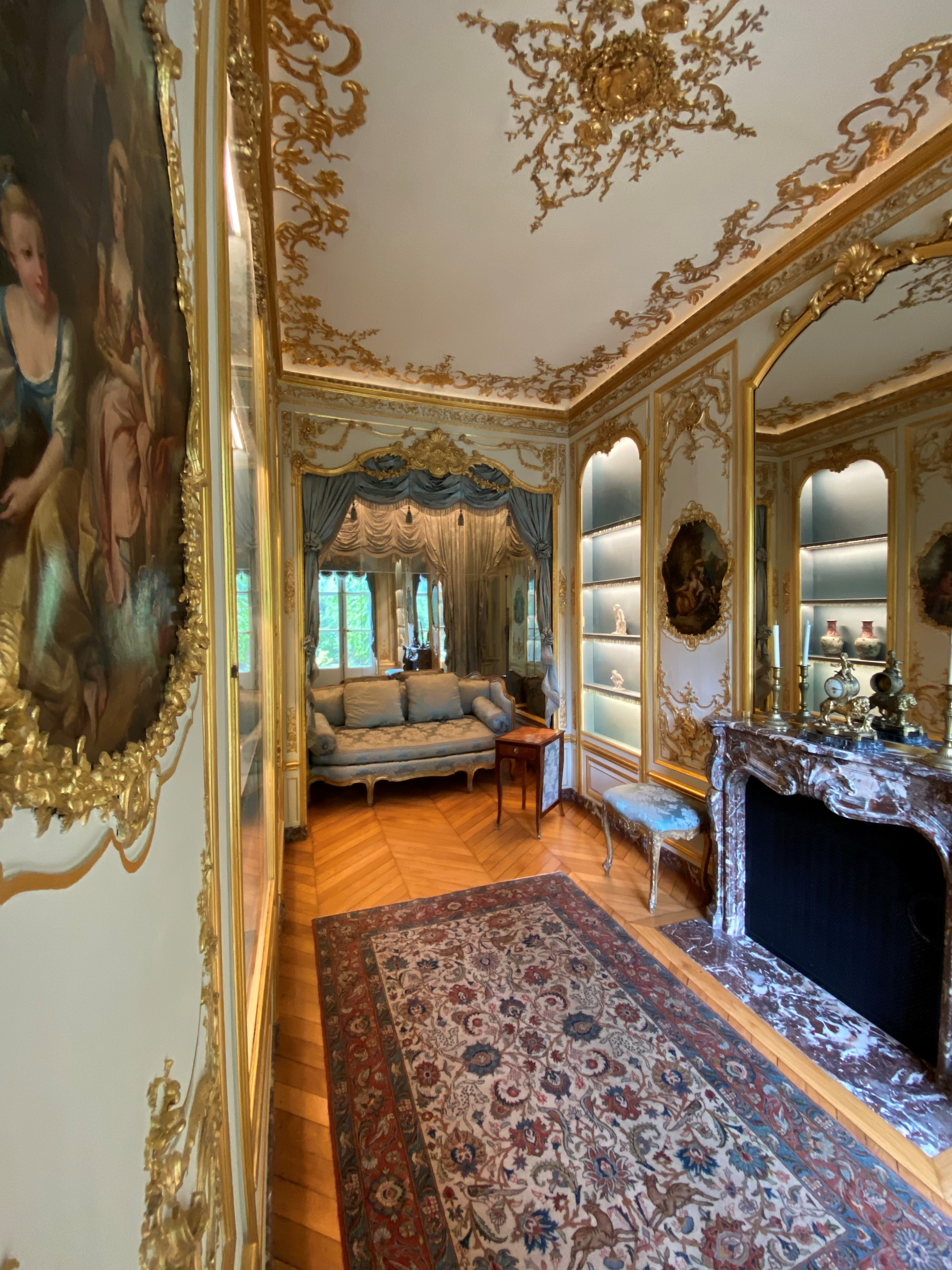
Salon de l'alcôve, also called Le Boudoir, at the Hôtel de Besenval. A richly decorated room in white and gold, showing four medallion paintings in the style of François Boucher. The painting La Gimblette hung in this room. It was also in this room where the Baron de Besenval kept his collection of gold snuffboxes. The bookshelves now serve as display cases.

However, it was in the first half of the 19th century that the family de Moreton de Chabrillan transformed the little adjoining room to the baron's former bedroom into a Salon de l'alcôve and embellished its wood panelling, dating originally from the 1720s, with elements in the Rococo Revival style, amongst others with four medallion paintings in the style of François Boucher, embedded in the wall panelling. Today, this room is also called Le Boudoir.

In the course of time and under the different owners, further decorative changes were made, especially before the turn of the 19th to the 20th century and in the early 20th century: Some parquet floors and fireplace mantels were replaced, the large 18th-century marble stove – decorated with gilt bronzes by Pierre Gouthière and placed in the vestibule – was dismantled and sold, the double-leaf doors of the Salon de la tapisserie were fitted with mirrors and the stucco ceiling in the Chambre du maître lost its elaborate neo Louis XV decoration (the ceiling decoration can still be seen in photographs dating from before World War I).

However, the Swiss Confederation renovated these rooms with great respect after acquiring the property in 1938, which had already been a listed building for 10 years at that point.

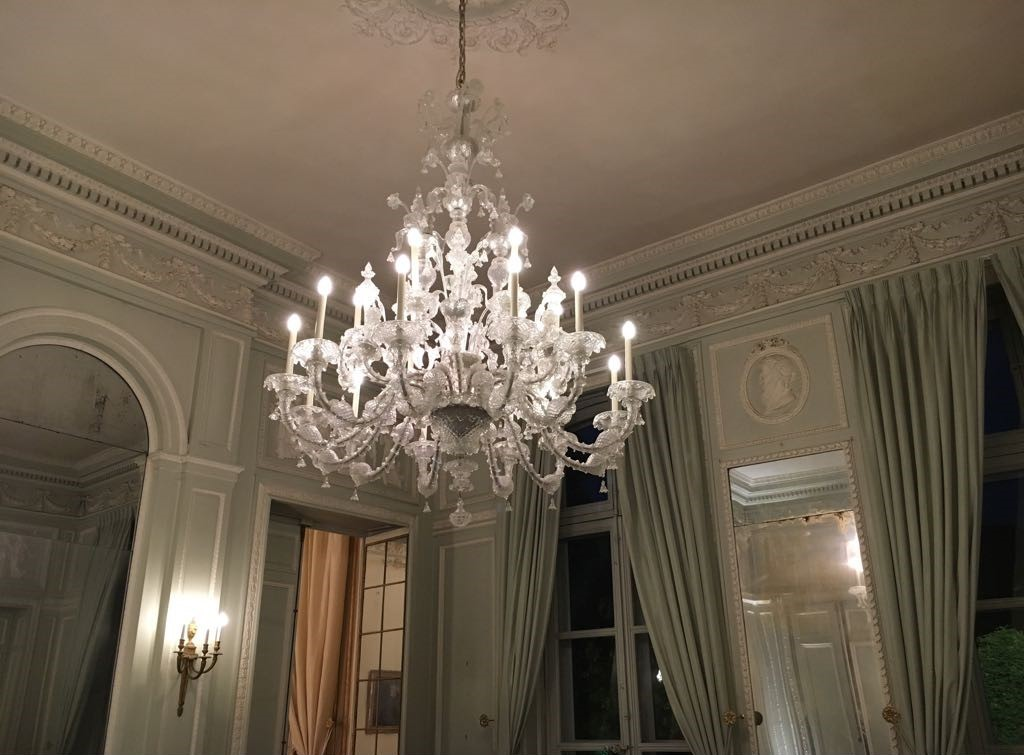
The Murano glass chandelier in the dining room was purchased from Barovier & Toso in 1962 on the initiative of Ambassador Agostino Giorgio Soldati. The carpet for the dining room was supplied by the Real Fábrica de Tapices. The relief between the windows above the mirror shows Plato. The mirror glass is the original glass as installed by Alexandre-Théodore Brongniart in 1782.

In addition, it was important to the Swiss Confederation to furnish the state apartments with appropriate furniture from the respective eras and styles. And, if at all possible, to get back some of the original furniture that was once part of the Hôtel de Besenval. The costs of purchasing all the antique furniture and works of art were largely borne by Swiss industrialists, who founded the association Amis de l'Hôtel de Pompadour for this purpose. The driving forces behind the extensive furnishing of antiques were Minister Walter Stucki and Ambassador Agostino Giorgio Soldati.

The state apartments and the cour d'honneur of the Hôtel de Besenval were used several times as film locations. Amongst others, for the films Beaumarchais, l'insolent in 1996 and Le Comte de Monte-Cristo in 1998. In the latter, the Hôtel de Besenval served as the headquarters of the Banque Danglars. Furthermore, on 30 November 2016, the Hôtel de Besenval was the subject of a documentary film by Stéphane Bern and his guest Jean-Christophe Rufin as part of Stéphan Bern's television format Visites privées, entitled Les réceptions de l'ambassadeur. In addition, France Télévisions produced the documentary Les Trésors des Ambassades Parisiennes in 2024, which also featured the Hôtel de Besenval. In this documentary, Dr. Guillaume Poisson of the University of Lausanne explains that there is evidence that King Louis XVI and Queen Marie-Antoinette were among the illustrious guests at the Baron de Besenval's regular soirées at the Hôtel de Besenval.

==== The Solothurn – Paris Axis: The return of the furniture and the families de Besenval and de Broglie ====
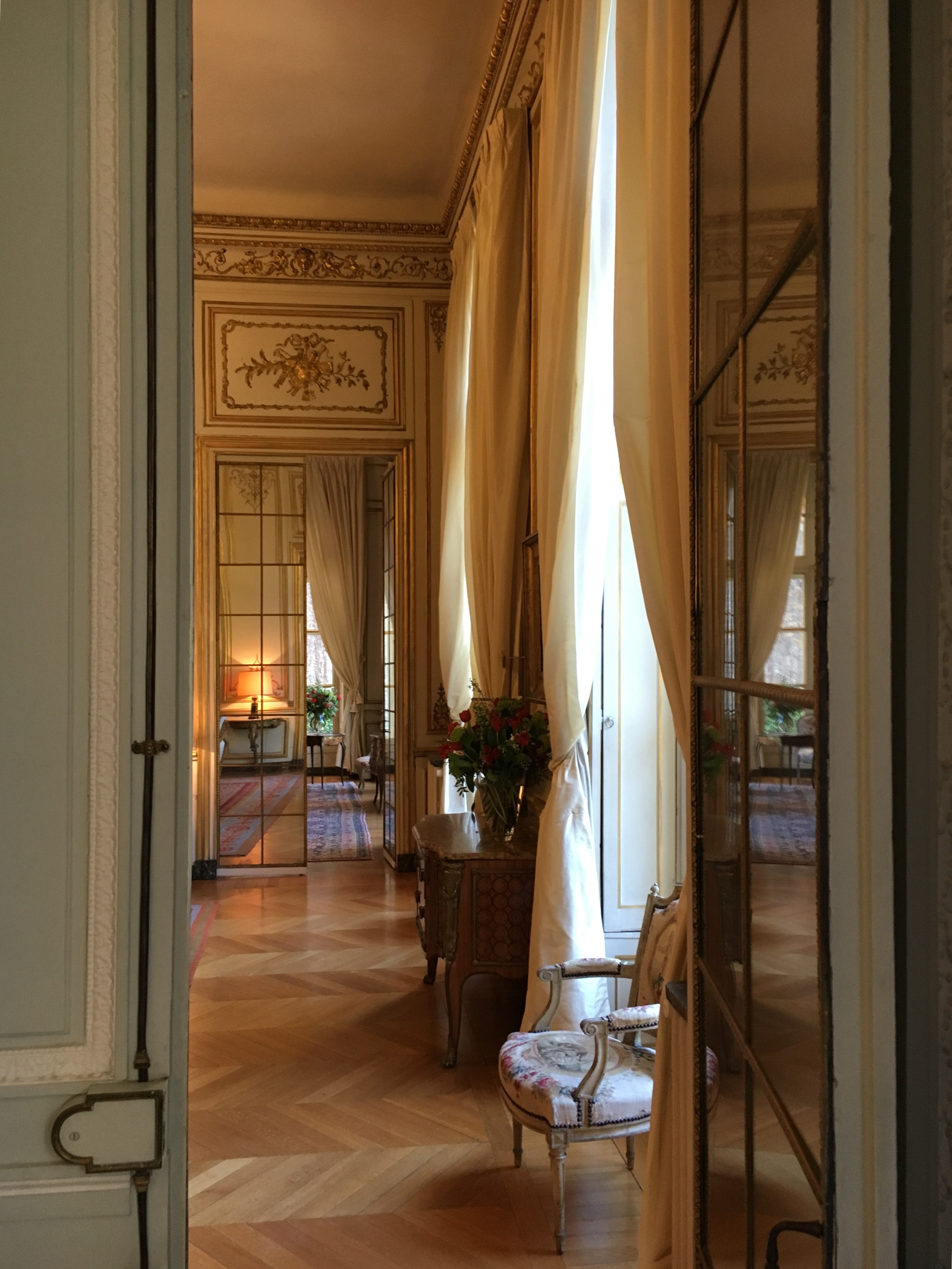
The enfilade at the Hôtel de Besenval, from the dining room through the Salon de la tapisserie to the Salon des perroquets. In the window niche is one of the six chairs of the baron's original furniture ensemble visible. It was Ambassador Agostino Giorgio Soldati, called Tino, and his wife Marguerite Daisy Soldati-Thome, Comtesse de Contades (1907–2001), called Daisy, who began to furnish the Hôtel de Besenval with antiques on a large scale in the style of Maison Jansen in the early 1960s, amongst others with the help of the Galerie Kraemer of Paris and the Galerie Moinat of Rolle. These acquisitions were largely paid for by Swiss industrialists.

A few years after the baron's death in 1791, the baron's furniture, works of art and further belongings from the Hôtel de Besenval were sold at auction in Paris on 10 August 1795. However, already during the baron's lifetime some pieces of furniture as well as paintings and further works of art from the Hôtel de Besenval were sent to his country estate in Switzerland, the Schloss Waldegg. According to oral tradition, shortly before the French Revolution, the baron sent a furniture ensemble to Switzerland comprising a sofa and six chairs. The chairs are painted in gris Trianon – a colour named after the Petit Trianon – and upholstered in beige fabric embroidered with scenes from the fables of Jean de La Fontaine, whereas the sofa features a pattern of flowers and birds. The sofa looks slightly different from the chairs. However, since the provenance is the same, it may already have been added to the ensemble by the Baron de Besenval.

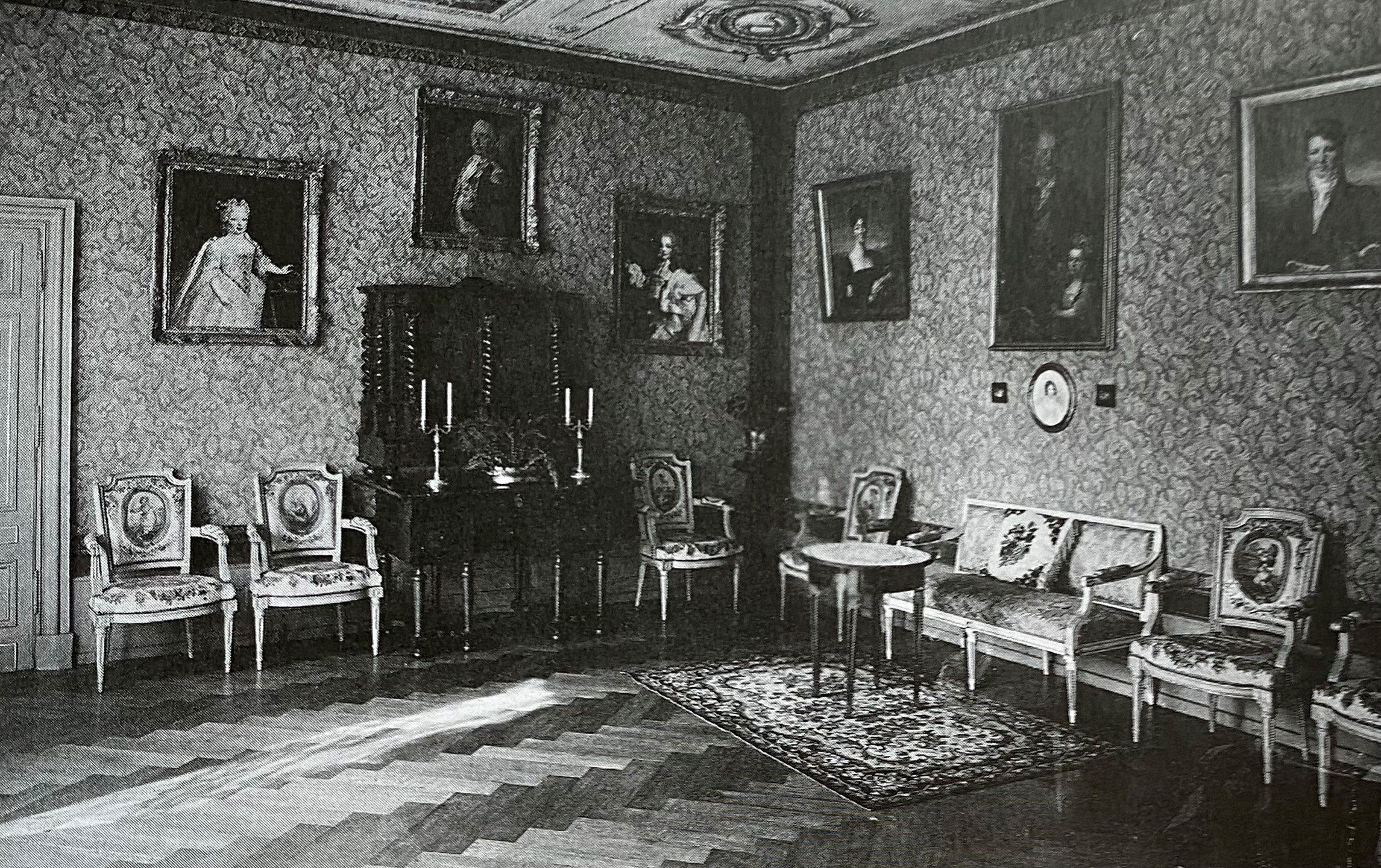
A photograph from the 1920s of the Salon de Besenval at the Schloss Waldegg: Visible are the six chairs of the original furniture ensemble from the Hôtel de Besenval (the sofa in the picture is not the one that the Swiss Confederation also bought for the Hôtel de Besenval in 1938).

The sofa and the six chairs were bought by the Swiss Confederation in 1938 from the patrician family von Sury for a total of CHF 4,000. Their ancestor, Josef von Sury von Bussy (1817–1887), who had been married to Charlotte de Besenval (1826–1885) since 26 June 1848, had bought the Schloss Waldegg – including its furniture and the paintings – on 6 February 1865 from the last members of the family de Besenval entitled to inherit the assets of the former Fidéicommis de Waldegg, which existed from 1684 to 1811. On the one hand, this was Amédée de Besenval (1809–1899), the brother-in-law of Josef von Sury von Bussy. He was the main heir to the Schloss Waldegg Estate. On the other hand, these were Amédée de Besenval's two daughters Marie Joséphine (1833–1869) and Marie Laurette (1837–1912), who had inherited their shares from their late mother Marie Louise Emélie de Besenval, née de Besenval (1804–1838). Marie Louise Emélie de Besenval, née de Besenval, was a first cousin of her husband Amédée de Besenval. With the death of Amédée Victor Louis, Comte de Besenval (1862–1927), who lived in Naples, the main line of the family died out. Amédée Victor Louis' father Victor (1819–?) and his uncle Jules (1820–1894) were both in military service in Naples for the then ruling dynasty, the House of Bourbon-Two Sicilies. Both served with the rank of captain. In 1840, they were joined by their brother Amédée (1809–1899). After the death of his wife, Marie Louise Emélie (1804–1838), he also settled in Naples for some time with his two daughters.

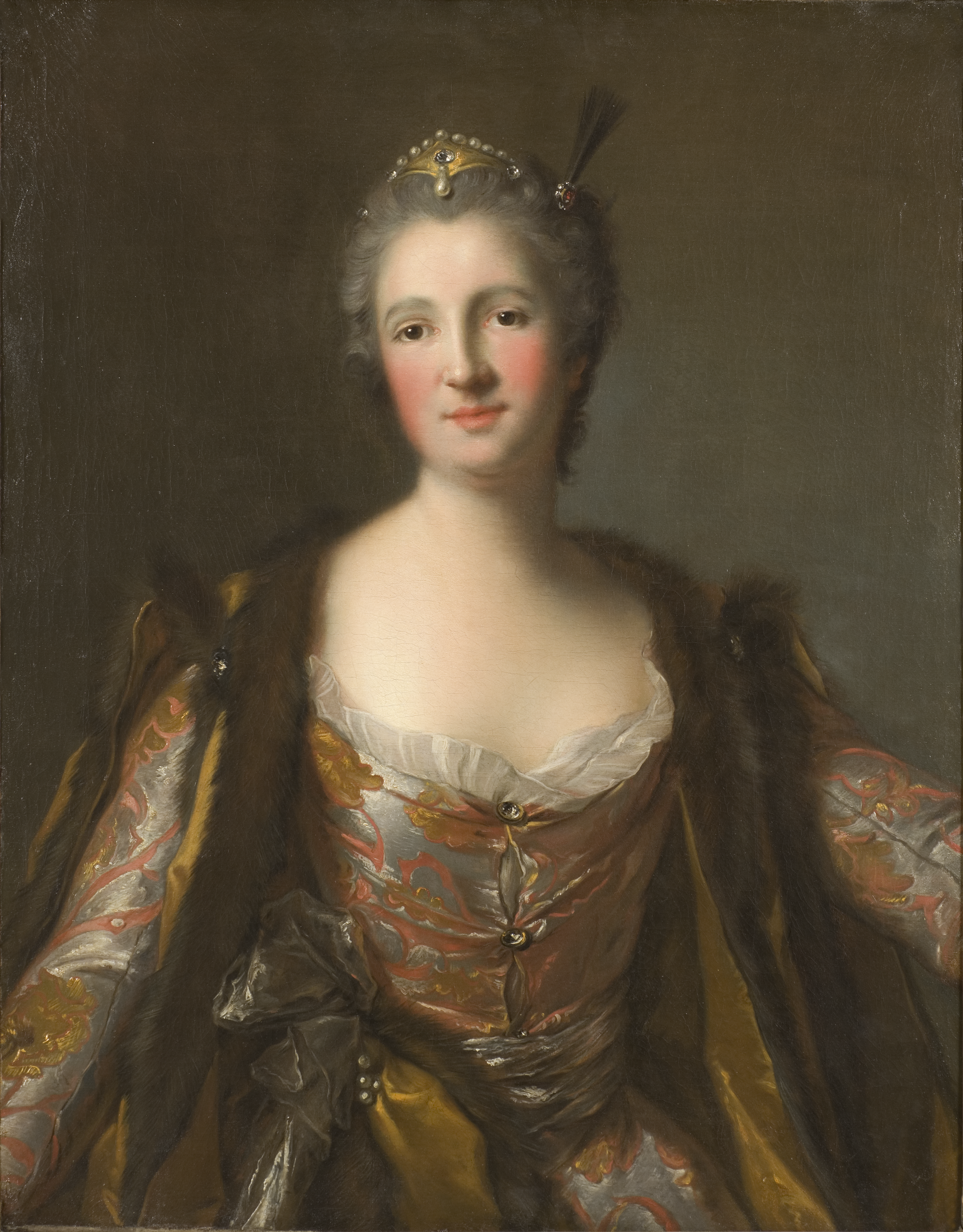
Théodora Élisabeth Catherine, Marquise de Broglie, née de Besenval de Brunstatt (1718–1777), sister of Pierre Victor de Besenval, who acted as lady of the house at the Hôtel de Besenval, after she had separated from her husband Charles Guillaume Louis, Marquis de Broglie (1716–1786). Portrayed by Jean-Marc Nattier in 1742. Today, this portrait is part of the collections of the Nationalmuseum.

Some members of the House of Broglie are the descendants of the French line of the family de Besenval. Pierre Victor de Besenval's sister Théodora Élisabeth Catherine, Marquise de Broglie (1718–1777), was married since 1733 to Charles Guillaume Louis, Marquis de Broglie (1716–1786), a cousin of Maréchal Victor-François, Duc de Broglie, on whose orders Pierre Victor de Besenval had withdrawn the troops from Paris on 14 July 1789. However, the couple later separated, whereupon Pierre Victor de Besenval's sister moved to the Hôtel de Besenval and took care of the household for her brother. But the connections between the families de Besenval and de Broglie never broke. On the contrary. In 1884, Jeanne Eméline Cabot de Dampmartin (1864–1901), granddaughter of Amédée, Comte de Besenval (1809–1899), married François, Prince de Broglie (1851–1939). In 1910, their son, Jean Amédée Marie Anatole, Prince de Broglie (1886–1918), married Marguerite Séverine Philippine Decazes de Glücksbierg. Amédée de Besenval's (1809–1899) father, Martin Louis, Comte de Besenval (1780–1853), was raised to the hereditary rank of comte by King Charles X on 18 March 1830. Consequently, Amédée inherited the title. This was the highest level of ennoblement the family de Besenval achieved.

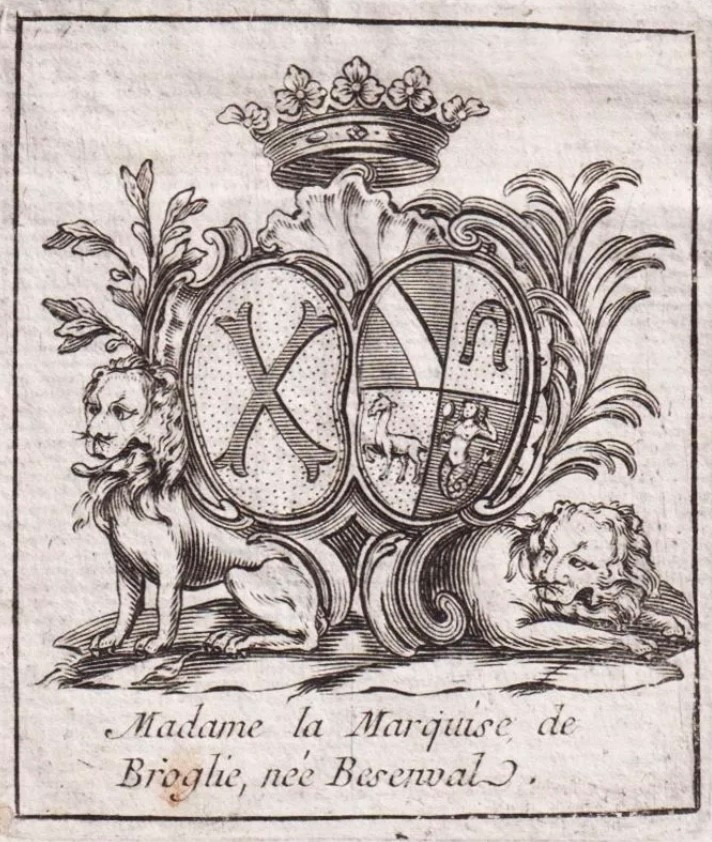
The arms of alliance of Théodora Élisabeth Catherine, Marquise de Broglie, née de Besenval de Brunstatt (1718–1777).

The descendants of this extended branch of the family de Besenval, the family de Broglie–Cabot de Dampmartin, also had the extensive family archive in their possession until 1980 with many original documents, also from the possession of Pierre Victor de Besenval and therefore with relevance for the history of the Hôtel de Besenval (75 boxes of documents, mostly dating from the 17th, 18th and 19th centuries). For many years the family archive was located on the estate of the family de Broglie, the Château de Broglie. Béatrix Marie Nadine, Princesse de Broglie, née de Faucigny Lucinge et Coligny (1902–1990), wife of Eugène Marie Amédée, Prince de Broglie (1891–1957), who was the son of François, Prince de Broglie (1851–1939), handed over the family archive to the Fondation pour l'histoire des Suisses dans le Monde in 1980 to exhibit it in their museum at the Château de Penthes. After the bankruptcy and dissolution of the Fondation pour l'histoire des Suisses dans le Monde in 2021, the archive of the family de Besenval was transferred to the state archive of the Canton of Solothurn, the hometown of the family de Besenval. However, by far the largest part of the collection of the dissolved Fondation pour l'histoire des Suisses dans le Monde was auctioned off on 20 and 21 September 2022 by the auction house Piguet in Geneva, including other heirlooms from the family de Besenval.

In 1938, after over 150 years, the sofa and the six chairs were returned to the Hôtel de Besenval, where they once again form part of the furnishings of the Salon de la tapisserie.

=== The Alliance Tapestry: A Testament to Franco-Swiss diplomacy ===
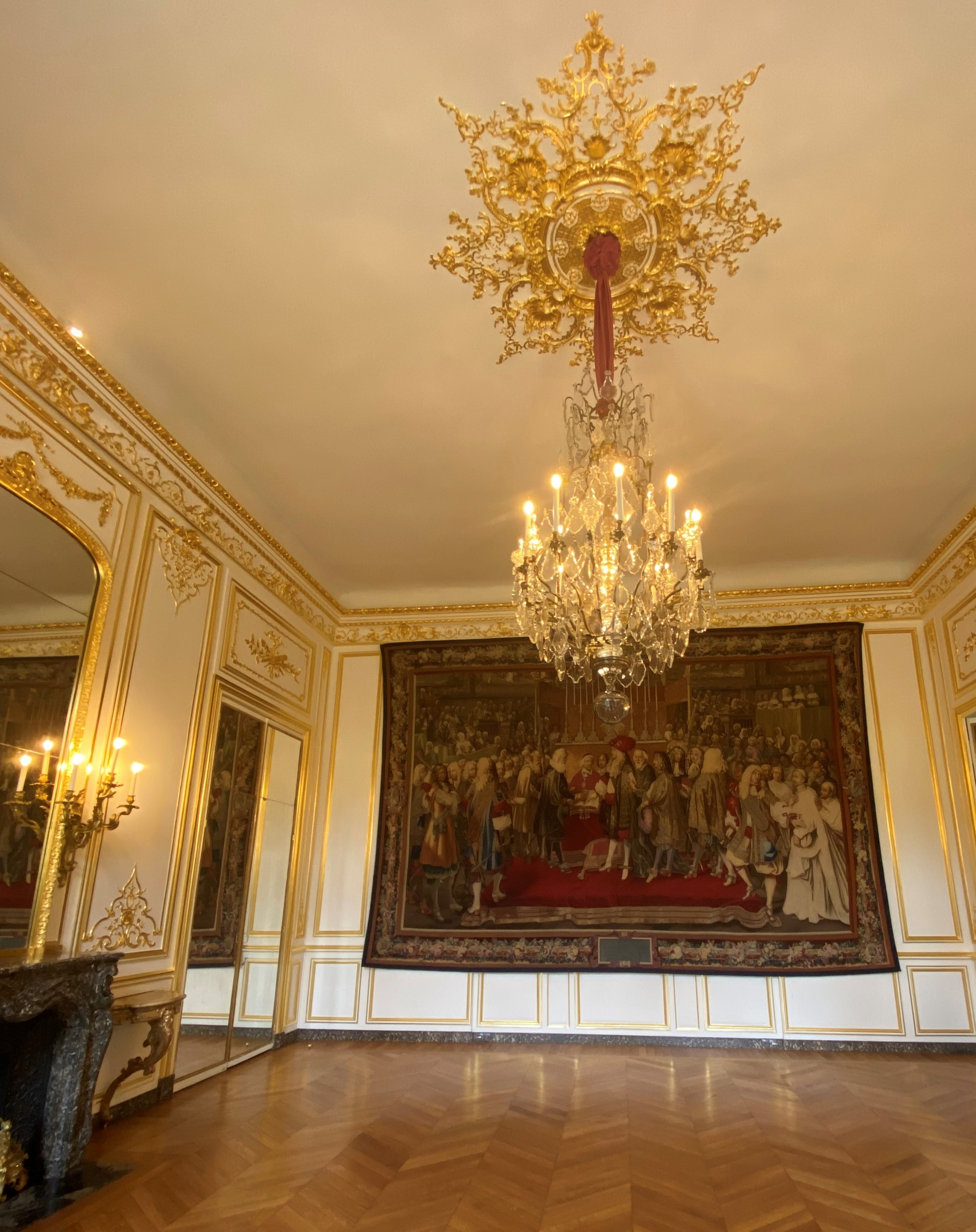
The Alliance Tapestry (3.87 m x 5.85 m) in the Salon de la tapisserie at the Hôtel de Besenval. In the foreground are King Louis XIV (right) and Johann Heinrich Waser, a Swiss politician, Mayor of Zürich and Bailiff of the County of Kyburg. Waser was the head of the Swiss delegation. Behind the king stands his brother Philippe de France, Duc d'Orléans, holding his hat in his hand. Behind Johann Heinrich Waser stands Anton von Graffenried, the Envoy of the Canton of Bern. The wood panelling of the Salon de la tapisserie largely dates from the second half of the 19th century. The pair of Louis XV style ormolu wall lights on either side of the mirror were installed during the renovation in 2019.

One of the most significant works of art in the Hôtel de Besenval today is the large 18th-century tapestry in the Salon de la tapisserie, formerly called the Chambre de parade, produced in the Gobelins Manufactory. The production of the first copies of these tapestries began already in 1665. The copy in the Hôtel de Besenval was made between 1732 and 1735 in the atelier of Dominique de la Croix, who was the head of the atelier between 1693 and 1737. The tapestry, woven based on a design by Charles Le Brun and a cartone by Simon Renard de Saint-André, is on loan by the Mobilier National.

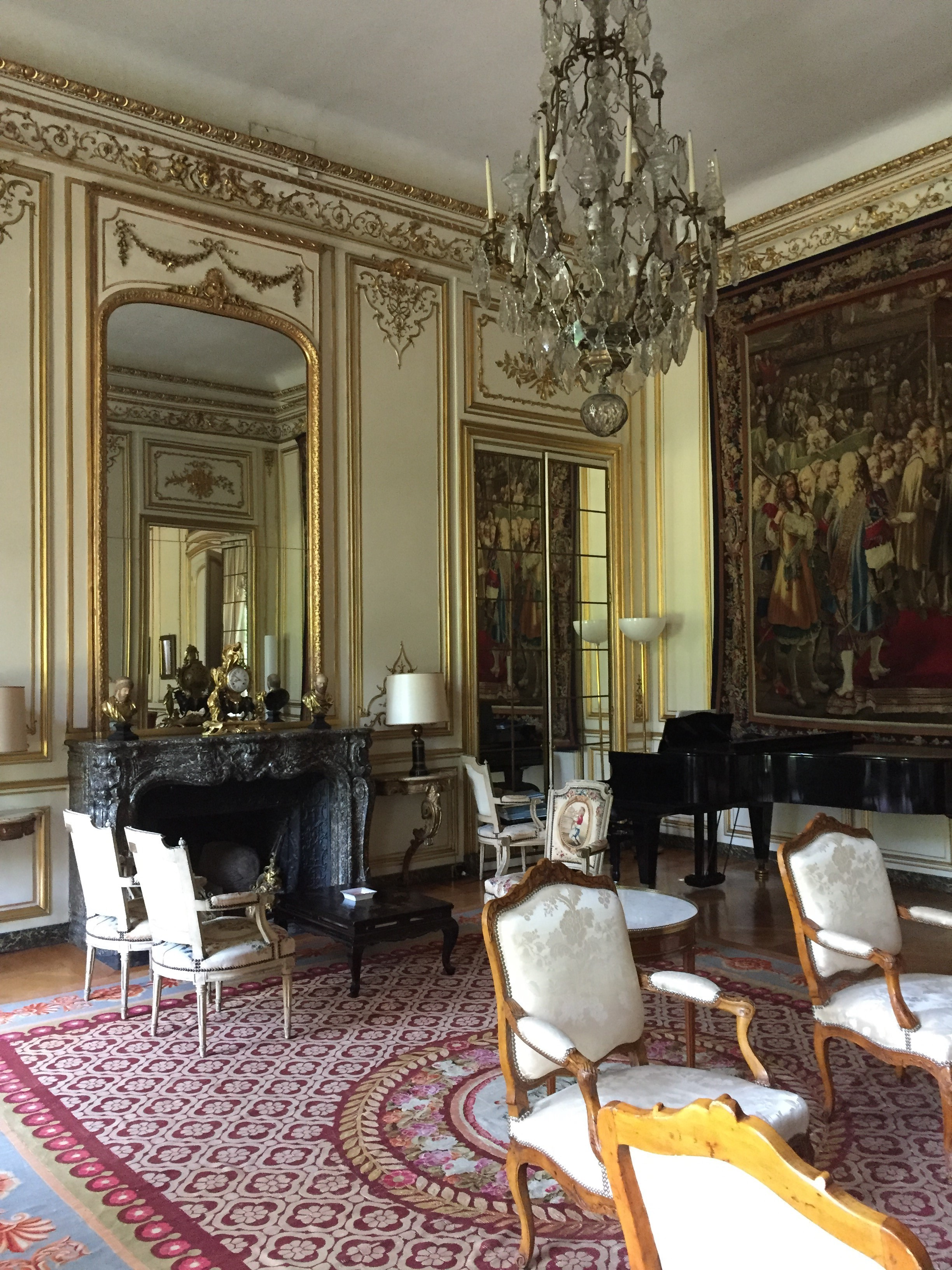
The Salon de la tapisserie as it was set up in 2018. In addition to part of the Alliance Tapestry, four of the six chairs from the baron's original furniture ensemble can be seen next to the fireplace.

The tapestry shows the historic moment of the festivities on 18 November 1663 in the Cathédrale Notre-Dame de Paris on the occasion of the renewal of the mercenary alliance of 1521, also called the Soldallianz von Luzern, between France and the Swiss, which was negotiated by the two parties in the aftermath of the Battle of Marignano and the peace treaty of 1516, known as Traité de Fribourg or Paix Perpétuelle (Perpetual Peace). It depicts the moment when King Louis XIV, the only non-clergyman allowed to wear a hat, and the envoys of the Confederation of the XIII cantons take an oath together on the Bible in the presence of Cardinal Antonio Barberini and several hundred dignitaries. And so one by one took the oath, which ended with the words of King Louis XIV: "Et moi aussi, je jure et promets" (and me too, I swear and promise).

This defensive alliance of 1521 had to be renewed with each French king. The renewals prior to 1663 took place in the years 1549, 1564, 1582 and 1602. The renewal of the alliance of 1663 on the French side was negotiated by Jean de La Barde, Marquis de Marolles-sur-Seine (1602–1692), the French ambassador to the Swiss cantons based in Solothurn. The alliance gave King Louis XIV, amongst others, the right to recruit up to 16,000 Swiss mercenaries. In return, the Swiss received certain trading privileges in France and a lot of money, which made some Swiss patrician families very rich, those families who put their regiments at the disposal of the king, such as the family de Besenval.

"This treaty brought France and the Swiss so many political and economic advantages that it was repeatedly renewed with minor expansions by the French kings François I to Louis XIV in 1663."

— Prof. Martin Körner (1936–2002), Vice President of the Swiss National Science Foundation (1997–2000), on the importance of the mercenary alliance of 1521 between France and the Swiss

The last major alliance in this context, concluded between the Swiss and the Kingdom of France under the Ancien Régime, was that of 1777, signed in Solothurn. In substantive terms, however, the alliance of 1777 went beyond that of 1663. The independence and neutrality of Switzerland (Corpus Helveticum) were more strongly emphasised. For this reason, the agreement was regarded as more than a mere renewal of the alliance. This centuries-old tradition of Franco-Swiss alliance under the Ancien Régime came to an end with the abolition of the French monarchy on 21 September 1792 and the proclamation of the First French Republic.

==== The Special Relationship: The glorification of the king's diplomatic achievements with the Swiss ====
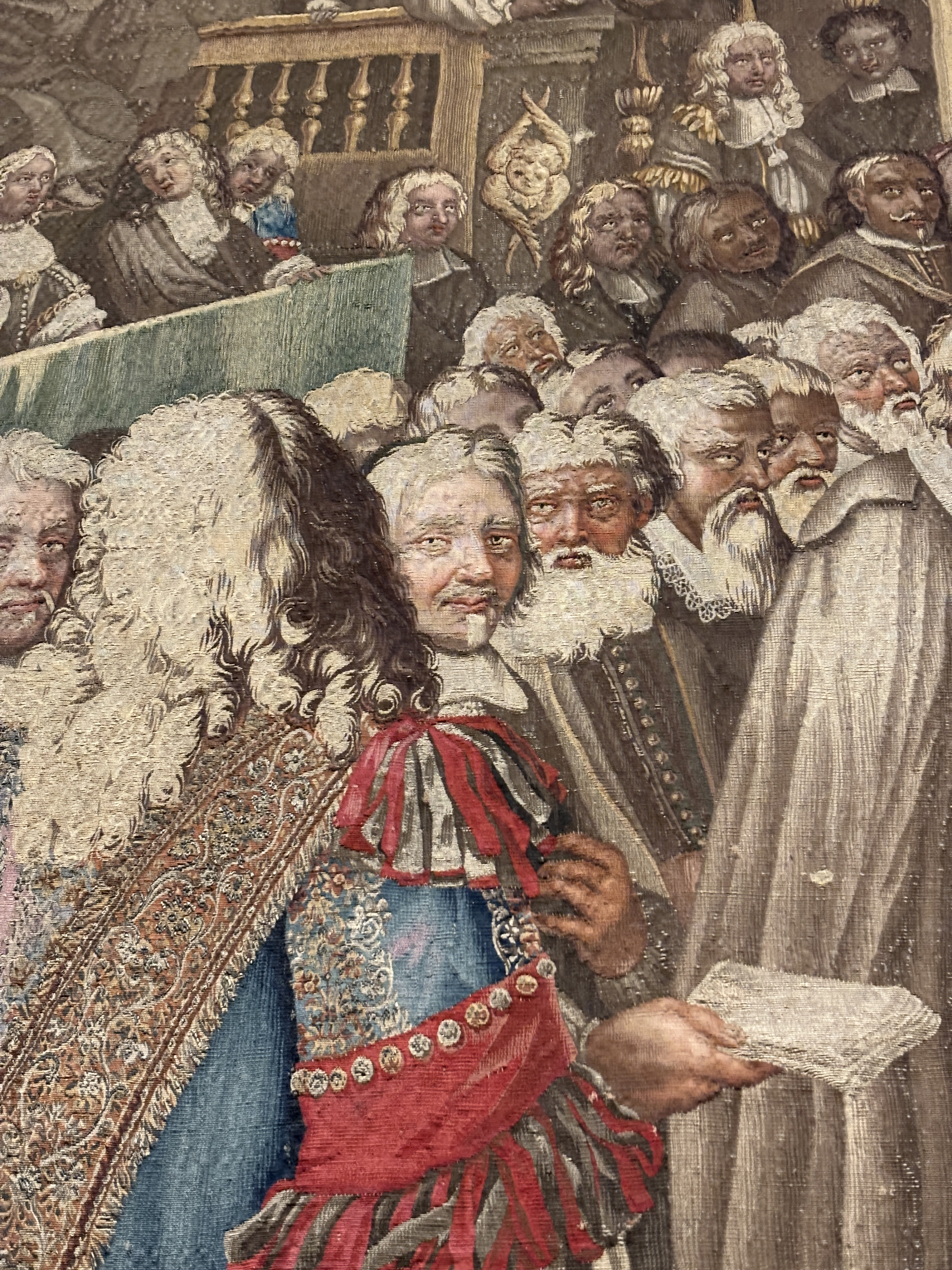
Detail of the Alliance Tapestry: It shows the French ambassador Jean de La Barde, Marquis de Marolles-sur-Seine (1602–1692), among the Swiss delegation holding a copy of the renewed alliance treaty.

This tapestry is part of the fourteen-episode sequel to the Histoire du Roi (The King's story). Seven copies of this Alliance Tapestry were made, as a total of seven series of the fourteen-episode sequel to the Histoire du Roi were produced between 1665 and 1742 (the Alliance Tapestry is episode number six). Four of the seven copies of the Alliance Tapestry have survived. In addition to the copy in the Hôtel de Besenval, there is also a copy in the Château de Versailles, in the Museum of the Gobelins Manufactory (Mobilier National) and in the Swiss National Museum in Zürich. The Zürich copy is from the fourth edition, created between 1729 and 1734. It is a loan from the Gottfried Keller Foundation, which acquired it in June 1896 in Paris as part of the sale of the Dreyfus-de Gonzalès Collection for FRF 88,000. Until the French Revolution, this tapestry was kept in the Embassy of France in Rome.

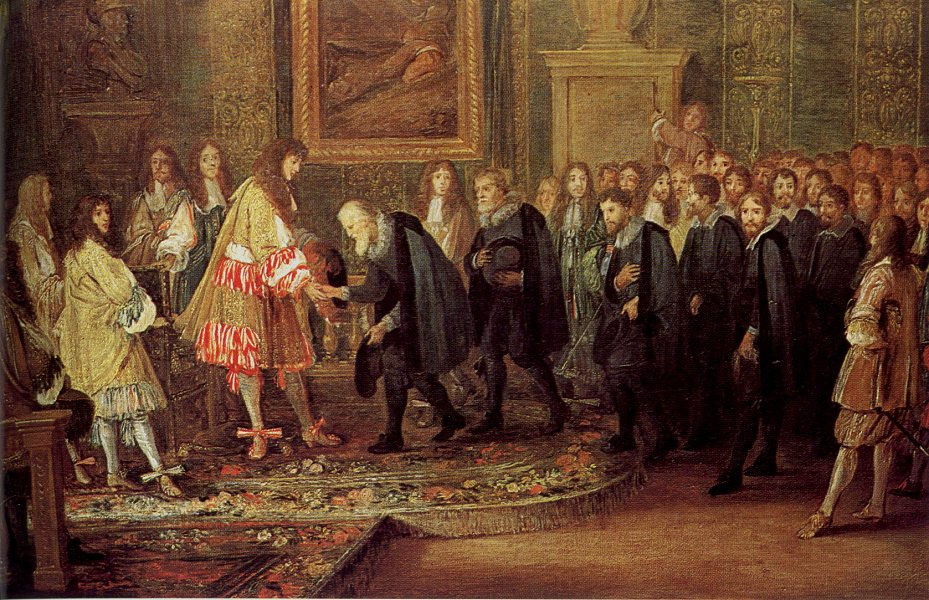
11 November 1663: Johann Heinrich Waser, the head of the Swiss delegation, bows to King Louis XIV. Behind Johann Heinrich Waser stands Anton von Graffenried, the Envoy of the Canton of Bern. This oil sketch on canvas, created in 1664 by Adam Frans van der Meulen, depicts the reception the king gave to the Swiss delegation at the Louvre prior to the celebrations on 18 November 1663 at the Cathédrale Notre-Dame de Paris, as depicted in the Alliance Tapestry. The first draft of the tapestry, which was later discarded in favour of the scene in the cathedral, was this scene in the Louvre. Today, this painting is part of the collections of the Château de Versailles.

The concept of portraying the key events in King Louis XIV's life in tapestry can be traced back to Jean Chapelain, an adviser to Jean-Baptiste Colbert. The production of the fourteen-episode sequel to the Histoire du Roi – to which three more episodes were later added – began in 1665. The aim was to present the greatest achievements of King Louis XIV in the military, civil and diplomatic spheres.

Since the royal court had a great interest in ensuring that as many people as possible knew about these key events, engravings of the individual tapestries were later made, which were widely distributed and glorified and shaped the image of the king in France as well as abroad.

The renewal of the mercenary alliance with the Swiss represented a significant achievement for French diplomacy. This is further supported by the very inclusion of this episode in the Histoire du Roi. Furthermore, ceiling painting № 27 in the Hall of Mirrors at the Château de Versailles, presumably by François Bonnemer, is dedicated to this historic event.

"There is none (...) who does not think that these foreigners [the Swiss] are those whose alliance the king ought to guard with the greatest care, if only because they separate Germany from Italy. But also, because when men make war their calling, it is no small task to recruit them and to prevent them from falling into the service of the enemy."

— Armand Jean du Plessis, Duc de Richelieu et de Fronsac, Principal ministre d'État, usually just referred to as Cardinal de Richelieu, on the importance of the mercenary alliance of 1521 between France and the Swiss in a letter to King Louis XIII in 1629

The tapestry, made from wool, silk and precious metal threads, bears the following inscription in the lower center (written in old French and capital letters):

«RENOWELLEMENT DE L'ALLIANCE ENTRE LA FRANCE ET LES SVISSES FAIT DANS L'EGLISE DE NOSTRE DAME DE PARIS PAR LE ROY LOVIS XIV ET LES AMBASSADEVRS DES XIII. CANTONS ET DE LEVRS ALLIEZ LE XVIII. NOVEMBRE M.DC.LXIII»

=== Entre cour et jardin ===
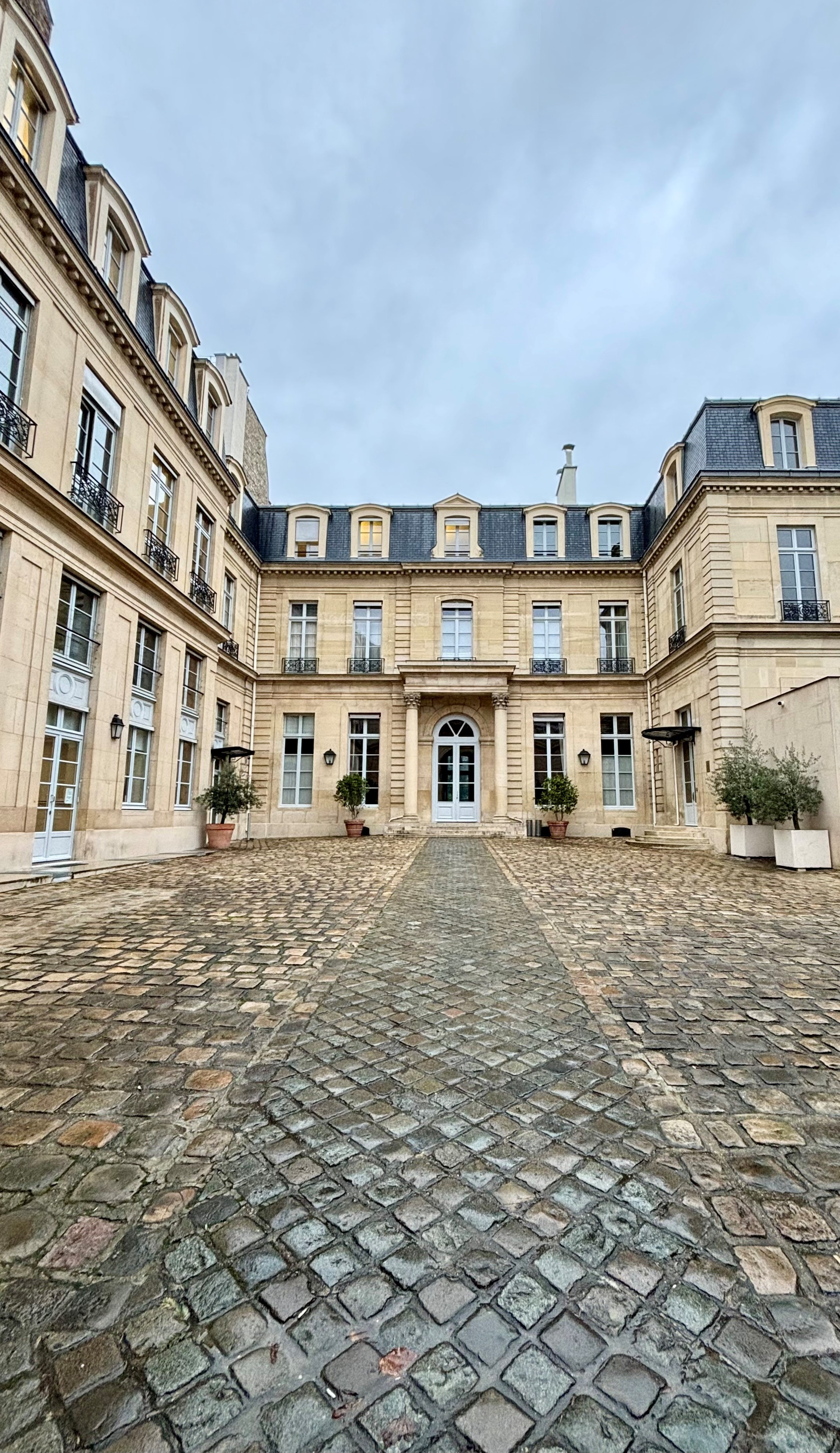
The cour d'honneur of the Hôtel de Besenval. On 13 July 1972, approximately 30 activists from the Béliers – a militant youth group of Jura separatists founded in 1962 – forcibly entered the Hôtel de Besenval and occupied parts of it as part of the campaign for the independence of the Jura from the Canton of Bern. After Ambassador Pierre Dupont (1912–1993) and Minister François de Ziegler negotiated with Jean-Claude Montavon (1944–2014), the leader of the intruders, and after receiving assurances that the French police would not intervene, the occupiers left the building after six hours. In Switzerland, Jean-Claude Montavon was sentenced to 20 days in prison for unlawful entry into premises.

The last major construction work on the Hôtel de Besenval, a classic example of a residence entre cour et jardin (between courtyard and garden), dates back to the late 1990s. This work primarily affected the office spaces in the non-historic side wings of the building, their attics and the attic of the corps de logis. In broad terms, it concerned all interior areas of the building that are not listed.

The renovation work, planned and carried out by the architects Herbert Furrer and Marc Zimmermann, focused on bringing the infrastructure up to date (electricity and security), making the previously unused attics usable as workspaces and creating contemporary workplaces within the existing office space. To ensure that these renovations could be carried out efficiently and that embassy operations continued to run smoothly, some offices were relocated to a temporary facility at 26 Rue Villiot for 18 months starting in April 1998.

==== Renovation of the state apartments and the preservation of the historic cobblestones ====
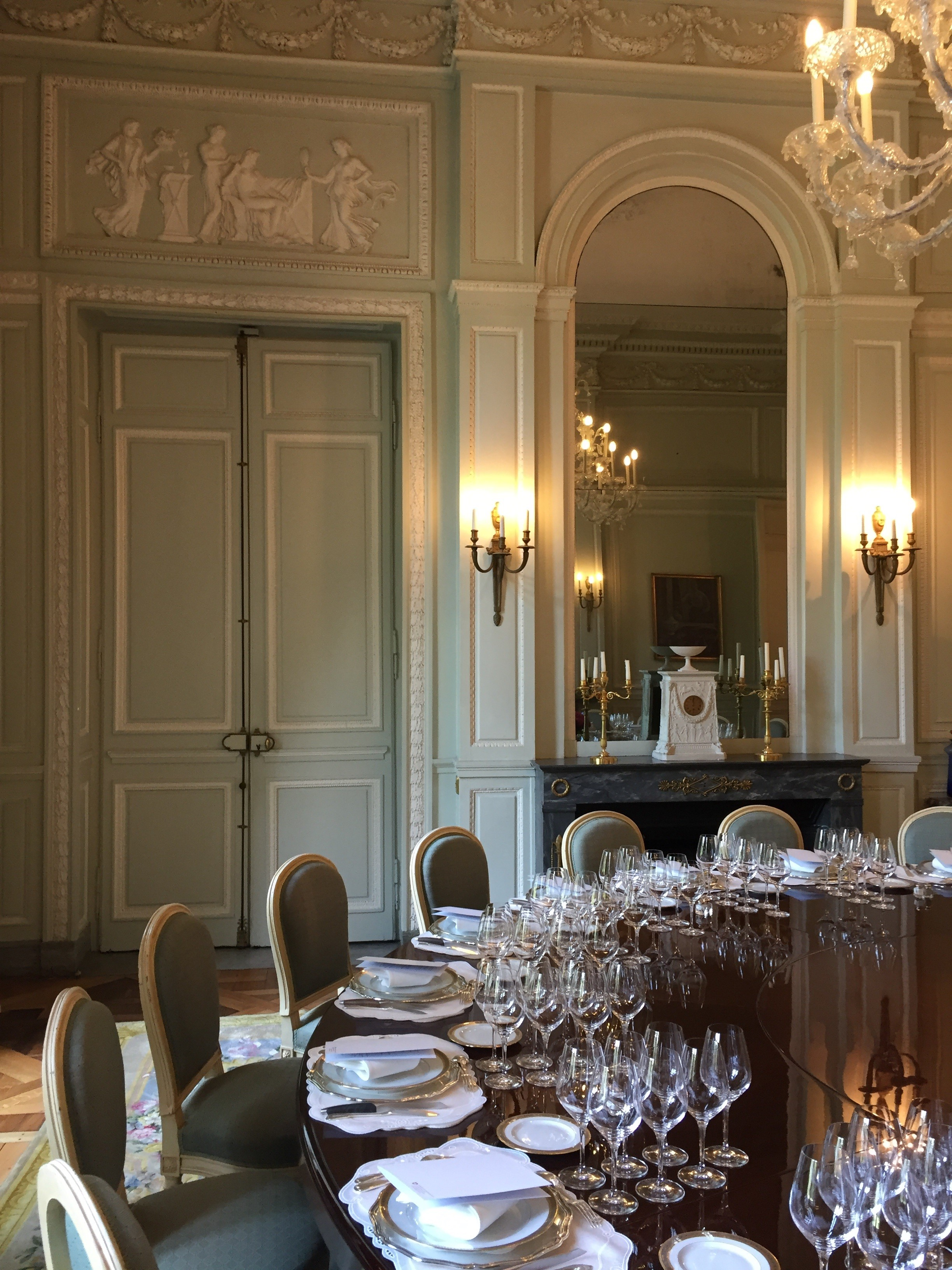
One of the overdoor reliefs in the dining room, depicting the Toilette of Venus, with the room's colour scheme as it appeared before 2019. The door leads to the library. A private room of the ambassador with little historical significance, both in terms of its furnishings and its fittings (the 1782 annexe replacing the former Cabinet chinois of Louis-Guy de Guérapin, Baron de Vauréal et Comte de Belleval).

The historic building structure of the corps de logis was only slightly affected by renovation and construction work in the 1990s. It was not until 2017, over the course of the following three years, that the historic interiors of the Hôtel de Besenval were restored once again as part of a major refurbishment, in close cooperation with the Direction régionale des affaires culturelles d'Île-de-France (DRAC Île-de-France). On this occasion, the antique furniture was also restored, and some pieces were reupholstered with fabric from Tassinari & Chatel, a manufacturer founded in 1680. A few additional antique pieces were acquired to complement the collection, and most of the curtains were replaced. The dining room underwent the most significant colour change of all the state apartments, having been repainted from mint green to grey-blue in 2019.

Furthermore, the work included the renovation of the façades and roof, the redesign of the commercial kitchen, the repair of the sanitary facilities and heating, as well as the adaptation of the general electrical installations to today's standards.

The cour d'honneur has resisted all modern fashion trends and renovations for centuries. It is still paved with the historic cobblestones à la Versailles on which already Pierre Victor de Besenval left his mark.

==== The garden of the Hôtel de Besenval: A source of inspiration ====
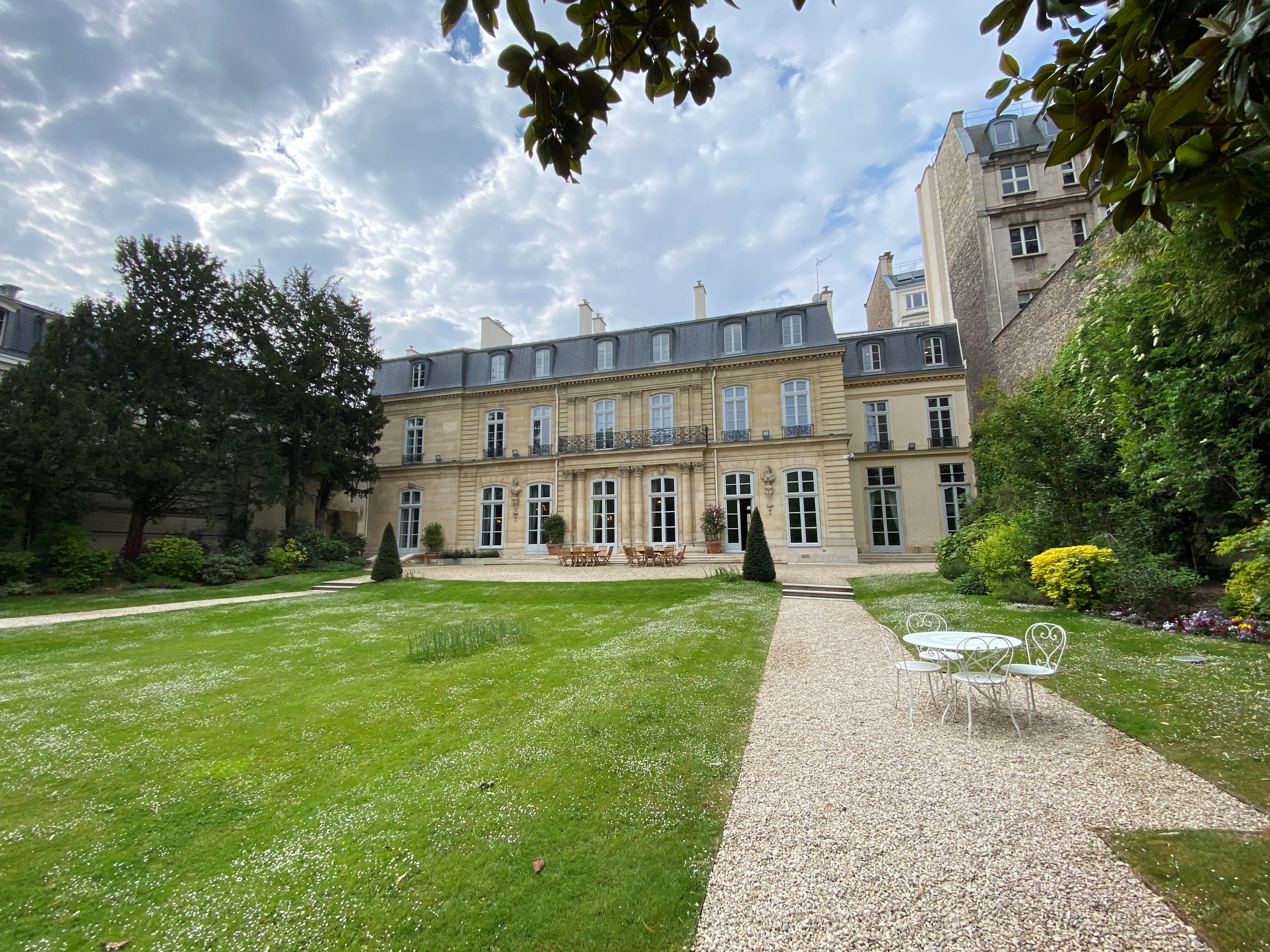
The garden façade of the Hôtel de Besenval. The garden adjoins that of the Hôtel de Monaco, which houses the residence of the Ambassador of Poland to France.

Pierre Victor de Besenval had the garden of his residence on the Rue de Grenelle converted into an English landscape garden and cultivated rare and exotic plants in specially designed greenhouses. In order to obtain seeds and specimens of rare plants such as orchids, jasmines and tulips, the baron was able to rely on a wide network of friends. In 1784 he received bulbs of unknown flowers from the Cape of Good Hope in South Africa through Colonel Charles-Daniel de Meuron from Neuchâtel. Pierre Victor de Besenval gave these flower bulbs to Queen Marie Antoinette, who had them planted in her garden at the Petit Trianon.

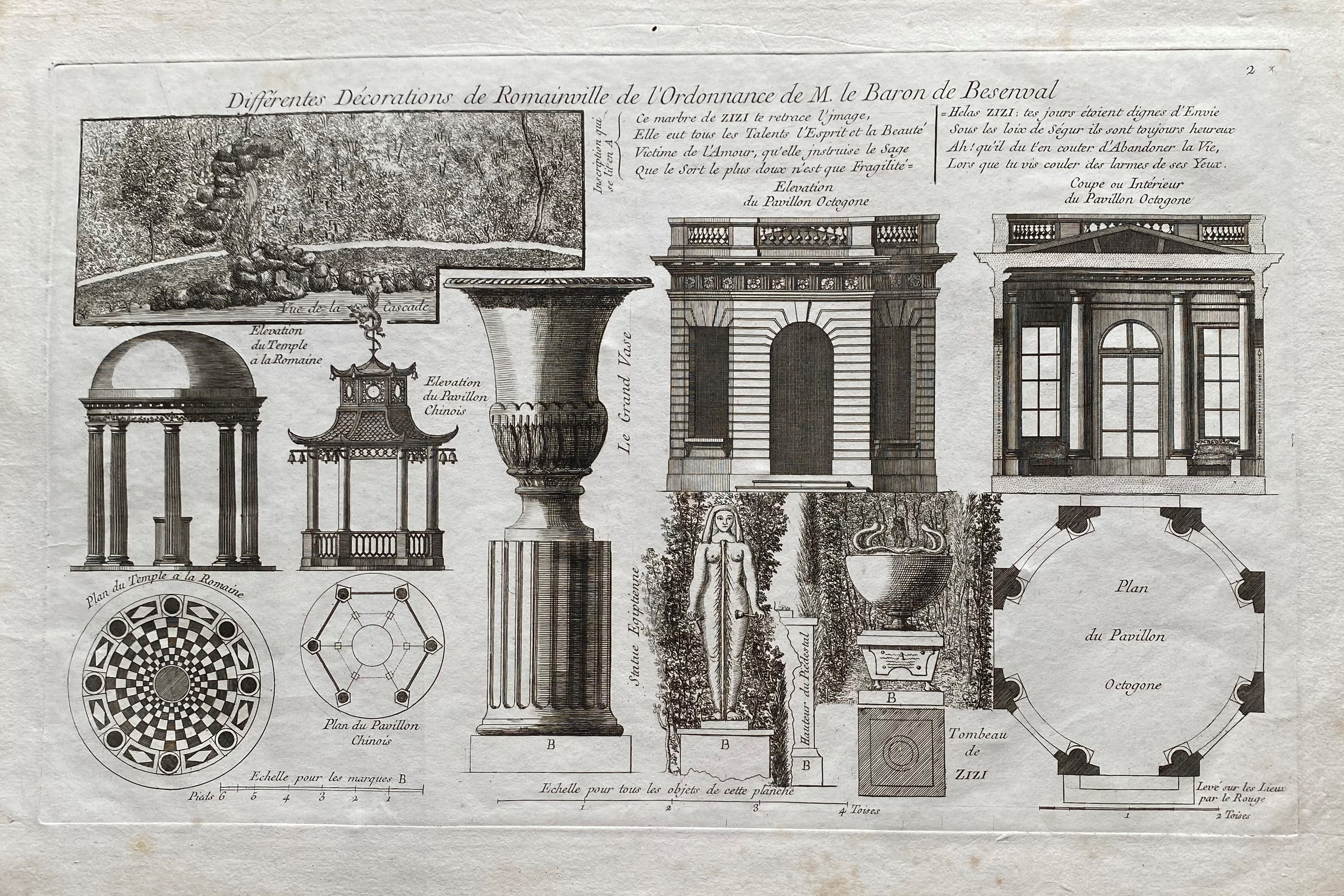
L'ordonnance de M. le Baron de Besenval – or the follies of the Baron de Besenval: It was Pierre Victor de Besenval who commissioned the new garden design for the Château de Romainville, based on his designs for his own gardens, in particular the garden of the Hôtel de Besenval.

Pierre Victor de Besenval designed not only his own gardens, in particular the garden of the Hôtel de Besenval and the garden of this country estate in Switzerland, the Schloss Waldegg, he also helped design his friends' gardens. These included both the garden of the Petit Trianon of Queen Marie-Antoinette and the garden of the Château de Romainville of his military comrade Philippe Henri, Marquis de Ségur, husband of the baron's mistress Louise-Anne-Madeleine, Marquise de Ségur, née de Vernon (1729–1778), and therefore mother of Pierre Victor de Besenval's illegitimate son Joseph-Alexandre Pierre, Vicomte de Ségur.

It was also Pierre Victor de Besenval who managed to inspire Queen Marie-Antoinette with his passion for rare plants. At his suggestion, the queen had various precious plant species planted in the garden of the Petit Trianon.

As in the field of the arts, the baron was also a patron in the field of botany. In 1782, Pierre-Joseph Buc'hoz named a plant after the baron to thank him for his support. Unfortunately, this plant had already received its scientific name a few years earlier and is therefore not known today as Besenvalia senegalensis but as Oncoba spinosa.

=== The Games of the XXXIII Olympiad ===
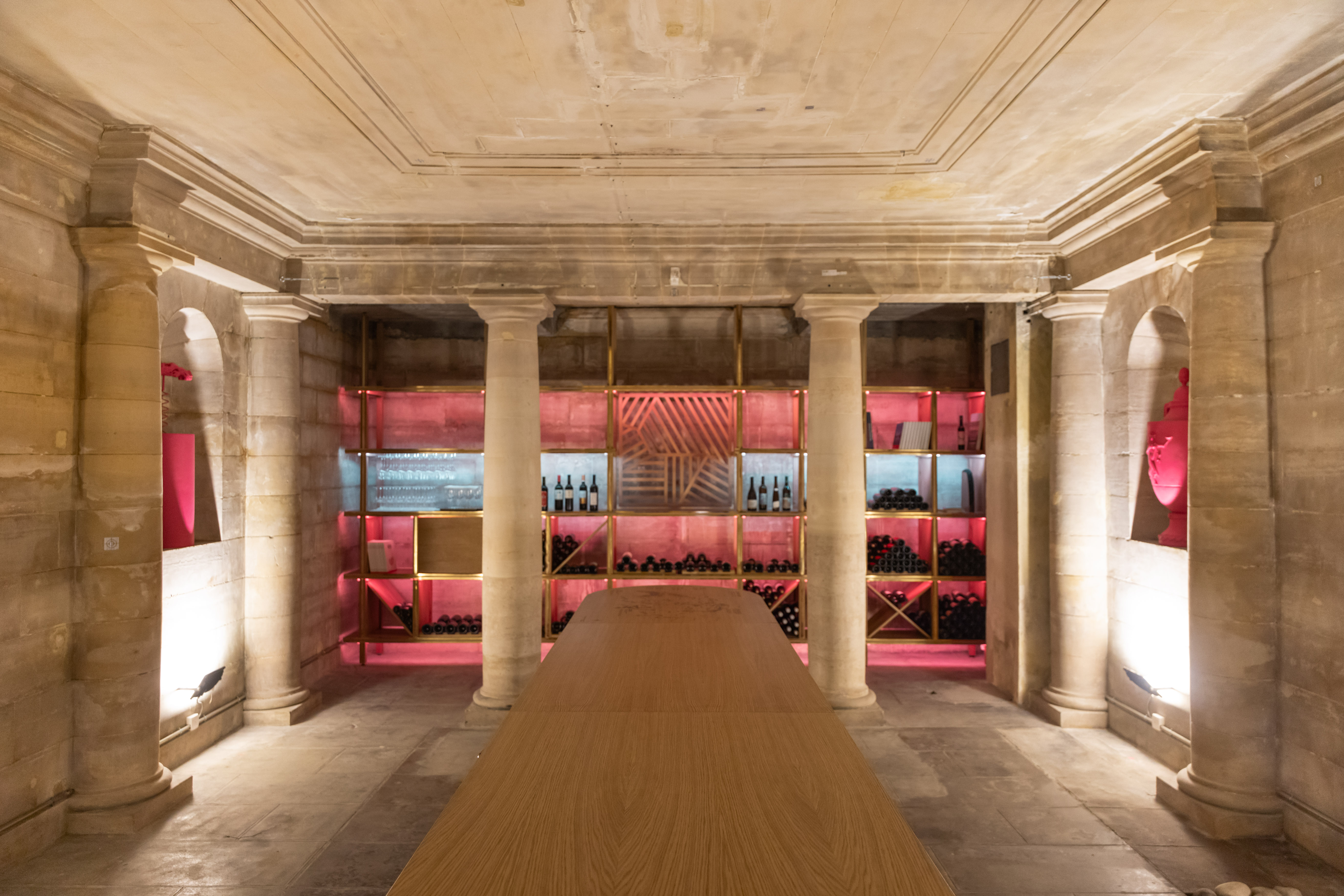
In the service of gastrodiplomacy: The Baron de Besenval's former nymphaeum after its renovation and transformation into a wine cellar in 2024. In the niche on the right hand side is the red-painted wooden replica of one of Claude Michel's vases visible. The figure in the opposite niche shows a large corkscrew. In the other two niches (not visible), there are sculptures of a grapevine and a pair of pruning shears. The custom-made oak table, crafted by the Paris-based atelier La Remanufacture, seats 14 people.

As part of the 2024 Summer Olympics and the 2024 Summer Paralympics in Paris, the Swiss Confederation set up a House of Switzerland in the garden of the Hôtel de Besenval. In addition to the Swiss athletes and a large number of international guests, Ambassador Roberto Balzaretti welcomed personalities from sports, politics, business and culture to the House of Switzerland, including Viola Amherd, President of the Swiss Confederation, Federal Councillor Ignazio Cassis, Federal Councillor Élisabeth Baume-Schneider, Thomas Bach, President of the International Olympic Committee, Anne Hidalgo, Mayor of Paris, and Jackie Chan. It was the first time that a House of Switzerland was built on the premises of an Embassy of the Swiss Confederation.

==== Renovation of the nymphaeum and its use in the service of diplomacy ====
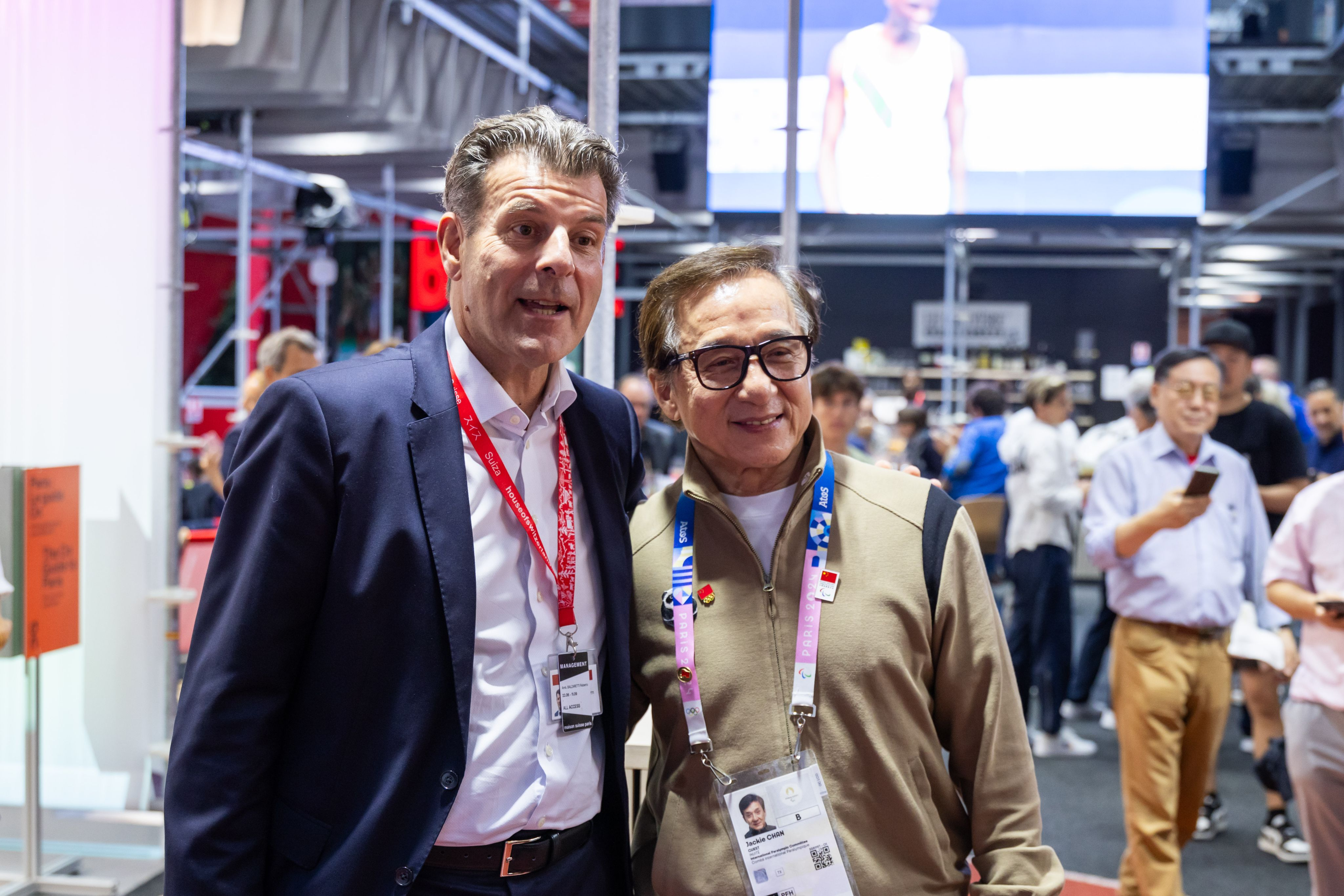
In the service of sports and gastrodiplomacy: Ambassador Roberto Balzaretti welcomes Jackie Chan on 30 October 2024 to the House of Switzerland in the garden of the Hôtel de Besenval.

In the run-up to the 2024 Olympic Games in Paris and the decision to erect a temporary House of Switzerland in the garden of the Hôtel de Besenval, the unique nymphaeum – commissioned in 1782 by Pierre Victor, Baron de Besenval, from the architect Alexandre-Théodore Brongniart and decorated by the artist Claude Michel – was also comprehensively renovated. As part of the renovation, the Paris-based atelier La Remanufacture created contemporary wooden replicas inspired by Claude Michel's original decoration, including a relief-decorated vase for one of the four niches.

Today, the nymphaeum serves, on the one hand, as a wine cellar for the Embassy of the Swiss Confederation and, on the other hand, as a reception or dining room for the Swiss ambassador on special occasions.

"The Hôtel de Besenval also constitutes an emblematic place in the history of Franco-Swiss relations in Paris, the continuity of which it symbolises."

— Ambassador Roberto Balzaretti
