= Political climate =

Collective mood of a society's politics

The political climate is the aggregate mood and opinions of a political society at a particular time. It is generally used to describe when the state of mood and opinion is changing or unstable. The phrase has origins from both ancient Greece and medieval-era France.

While the concept of a political climate has been used historically to describe both politics and public reactions to political actions in various forms, the naming of the concept by the addition of the modifier "political" to the base "climate" has been fairly recent. Public opinion is also widely used incorrectly as a synonym for political climate.

As for judging what the climate is at any given time, there is no way to know an entire country's views on certain subjects. So, polls are used to estimate what the political climate "feels" like on a regular basis.

== Etymology ==
=== Climate ===
According to the Oxford English Dictionary, the base climate comes from the Middle French climat, which was first used to describe a region's prevailing weather conditions around 1314. One of the first recorded uses of climate as a description of prevailing political attitudes was in The Vanity of Dogmatizing by Joseph Glanvill in 1661 where he mentions "divers Climates of Opinion".

=== Political ===
The modifier (politic with the –al suffix) comes originally from the ancient Greek noun polis which referred to both a Greek city state, and the ideal state or government. Over time, this evolved through the Latin noun politicus which is defined as the civil government, to the Middle French adjective politique which is the state of government, or relating to government.

== Usage ==
=== Historical example ===
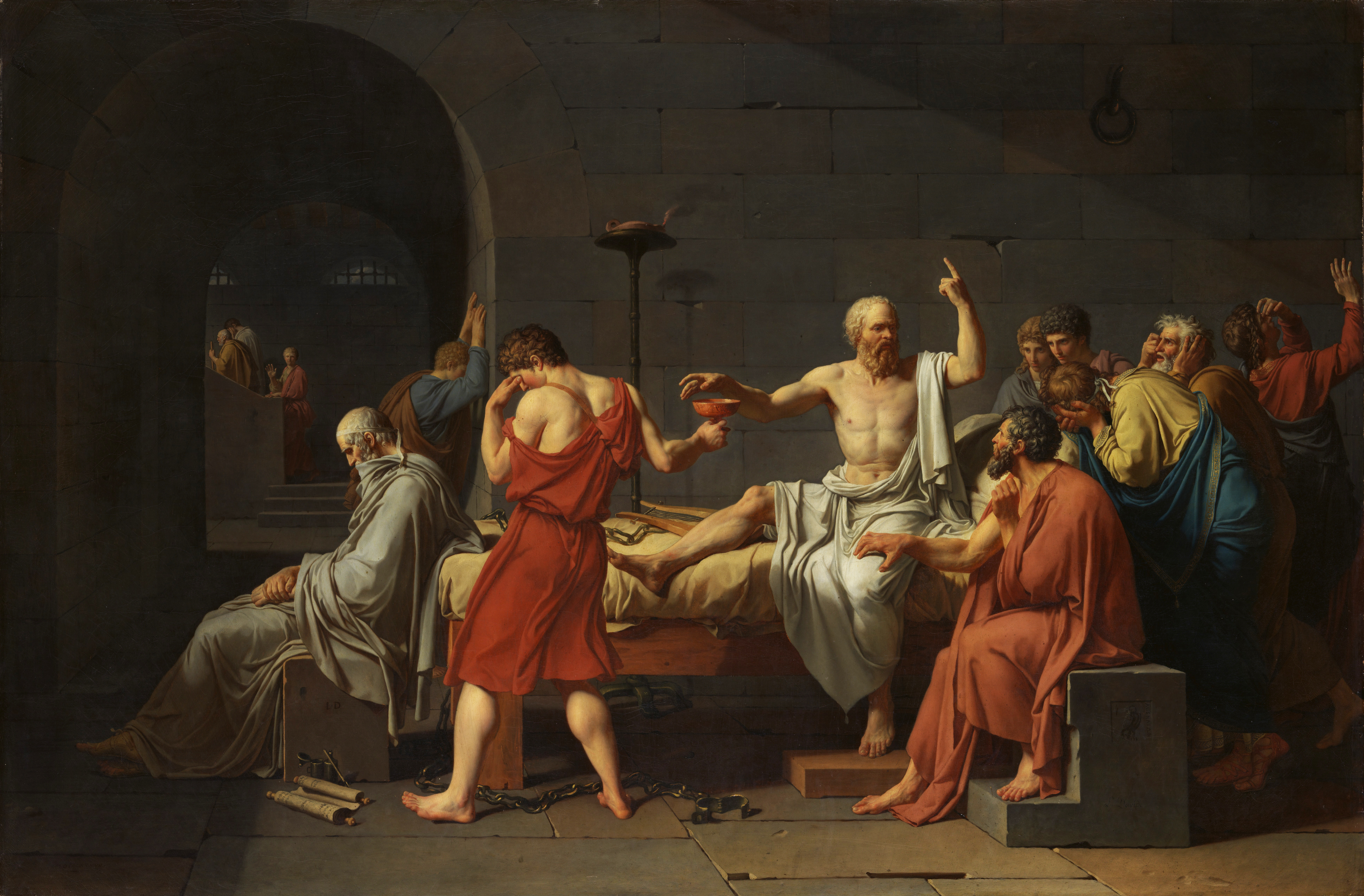
The Death of Socrates, by Jacques-Louis David (1787).

From 431 B.C.E to 404 B.C.E., ancient Greece was torn apart by the Peloponnesian War between Athens and Sparta. The war concluded with an Athenian defeat and several years of oppression by pro-Spartan rulers. By 399 B.C.E, Athens had returned to self-rule through revolution. At this time, Athens was undergoing social turmoil due to the apparent failure of democracy as an effective form of government, which created a public backlash against anything anti-democratic.

Socrates—the self-described "gadfly" of Athens because of his practice of elenchos (critical interrogation)—was seen by many as anti-democratic and thus a traitor to Athens due to his associations with Critias and Alcibiades (the former a Spartan supported tyrant, the latter a deserter to Sparta) and his frequent praises of the Spartan and Cretan governments because of their similarity to many of his philosophical opinions on government. The prevailing political climate of distrusting anything remotely anti-Athens or anti-democracy coupled with attacks from Socrates's personal enemies led to the philosopher's execution by poison in 399 B.C.E.

=== Public opinion ===
The phrase originates from the French term opinion publique, which was first attributed to Montaigne, the father of modern Skepticism and a major figure of the French Renaissance, around 1588 C.E. It is generally used to describe the overall opinion of the public body about a certain issue. The phrase is commonly used interchangeably with political climate but the two actually refer to separate concepts. Public opinion is the aggregate logical thoughts that the public thinks and expresses about an issue (which does not have to be political in nature), while political climate is what the public's emotional reaction to those logical thoughts are.

Depending on the nature of the thoughts (if they are considered controversial or extreme), the emotional reaction can range from nothing to a highly violent state. Accordingly, controversial issues in the public eye are usually accompanied by or can even produce a polarizing political climate. For example, the introduction, passing, and court fight over Proposition 8 in California brought a controversial issue into the public sphere, which resulted in such a drastic change in the political climate of the United States as to produce many protests throughout the nation, some of them violent.

=== Opinion polls ===
An opinion poll is a survey of public opinion from a particular group of people or sample. For determining the political climate, this usually would be a cross-section of the population in question. Opinion polls conduct series of questions and then extrapolate the average opinion of the sample according to their answers. However, opinion polls generally have appreciative margins of error because of the inability to survey the entire population and the improbability of surveying a perfectly random cross-section of the population. For example, the Wall Street Journal estimated in 2006 that the average margin of error is about 3-5% in opinion polls because of a wide variety of potential inaccuracies such as response bias and selection bias.

Opinion polls are also known to be entirely incorrect when predicting the outcome of certain events. The best-known example of this is the 1948 US presidential election, in which the prediction was that Thomas Dewey would easily defeat Harry Truman. Major polling organizations, including Gallup and Roper, indicated a landslide victory for Dewey when, in fact, Truman was the victor in a close election and kept the presidency. 2016 saw the validity of opinion polls enter the debate once more, as polls in both the UK "Brexit" referendum and the US presidential election were ultimately shown to be largely incorrect. Polls widely predicted a win for Democratic candidate Hillary Clinton, while instead Republican candidate Donald J. Trump won the Electoral College and, therefore, the presidency.

== See also ==
- Climate
- Socrates
- Peloponnesian War
- Critias
- Alcibiades
- Montaigne
- Proposition 8
- Bias
