= Simon Denis =

Flemish painter (1755–1813)

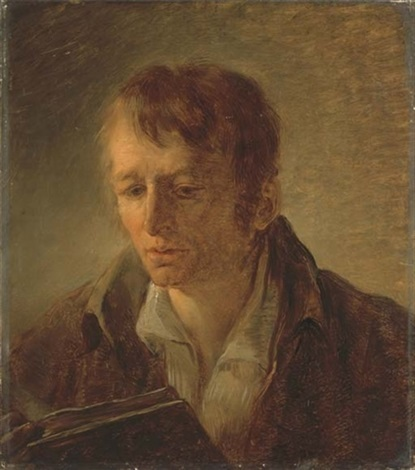
Simon Denis, self-portrait (circa 1785)

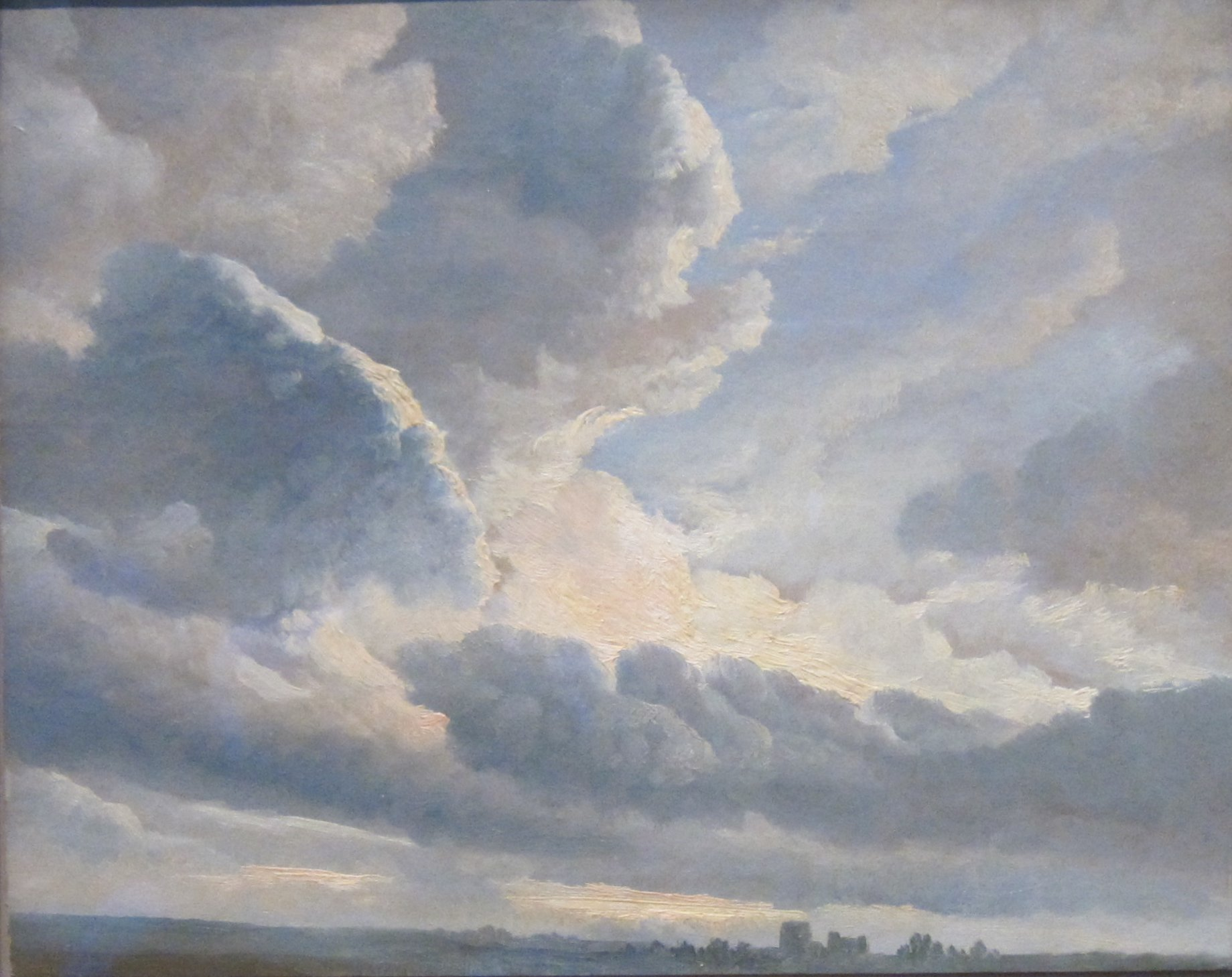
Study of Clouds with a Sunset near Rome, oil on paper, now at the J. Paul Getty Museum

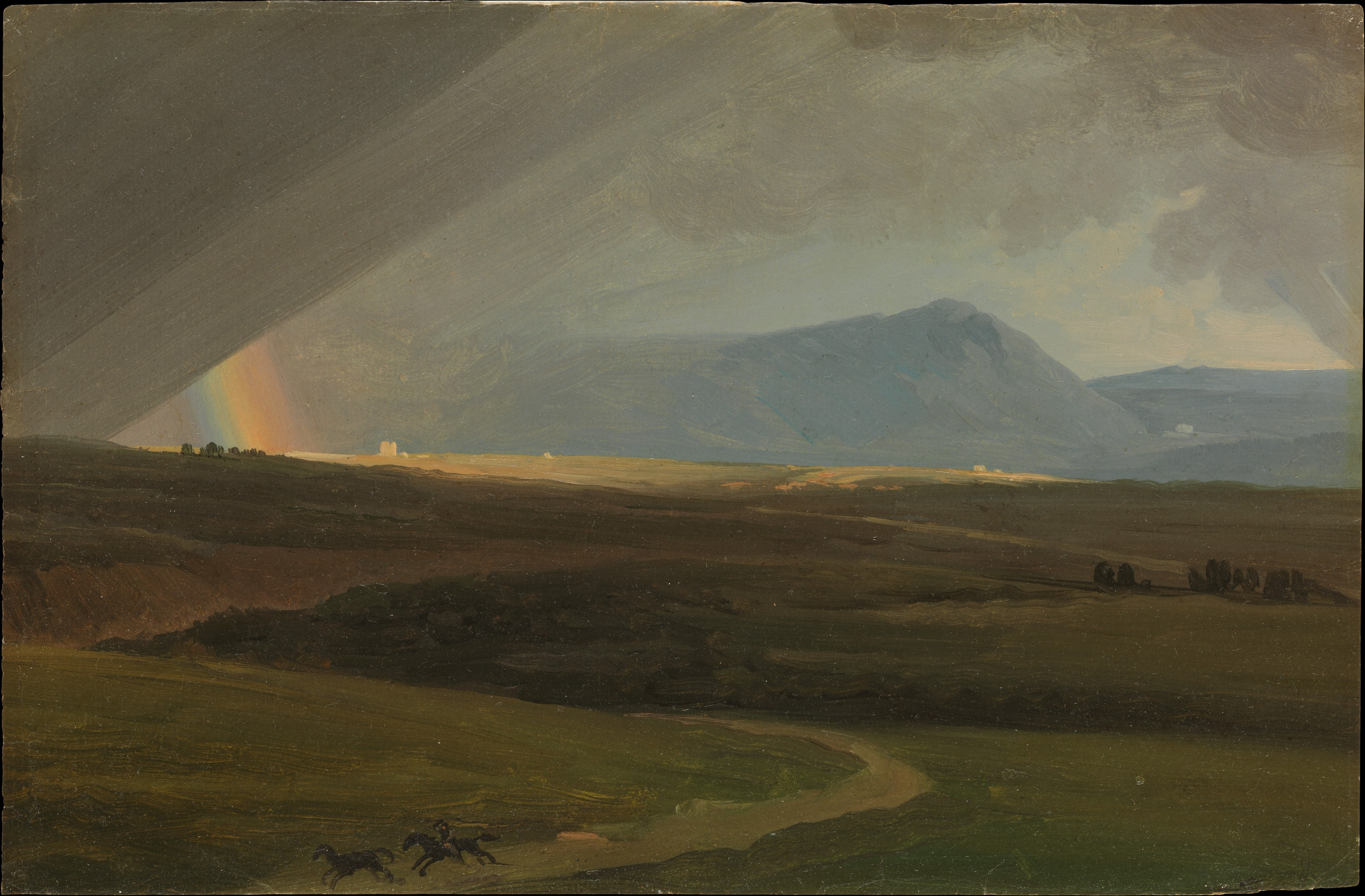
Landscape near Rome during a Storm (1786–1806) oil on paper, now at The Metropolitan Museum of Art

Simon-Joseph-Alexandre-Clément Denis (14 April 1755 in Antwerp – 1 January 1813 in Naples) was a Flemish painter active primarily in Italy.

== Life ==
Denis first studied in his native city of Antwerp, with the landscape and animal painter H.-J. Antonissen. The work of Balthasar Paul Ommeganck also influenced his style.

He lived in Paris for ten years where he gained the patronage of genre painter and art dealer Jean-Baptiste-Pierre Lebrun, whose support allowed him to move to Rome in 1786. His paintings there attracted favorable attention, and in 1787 he married a local woman. He remained close to the Flemish community in Rome, and in 1789 was elected to head the Foundation St.-Julien-des-Flamands. He also developed ties within the French artistic community; Élisabeth-Louise Vigée-Le Brun stayed with him for some days in 1789 and that same year he and she traveled with François-Guillaume Ménageot to visit Tivoli. During his period in Rome, Denis painted in open air prioritizing famous landscapes such as the waterfalls of Tivoli in the outskirt of Rome, annotating some of his works.

François Marius Granet sought his advice when he arrived in Rome in 1802.

In 1803, he was elected to the Accademia di San Luca.

Simon Denis exhibited several times at the Salon de peinture de Paris : two Vue de Rivière. Paysage orné de figures & d’animaux in 1791 catalogue number 87 and 740, one Paysage in 1802 (then purchased by the maréchal Murat) catalogue number 81, one Cheval se défendant contre un taureau in 1804 catalogue number 127, and Des bœufs gardés par des chiens in 1808 catalogue number 170.

He settled for good in Naples in 1806, becoming first court painter to Joseph Bonaparte. From 1809 he became professor at the Accademia di Belle Arti.

Landscape painter Prosper Barrigue de Fontainieu (1760–1850) was his pupil.

Denis died in 1813.

View of the Roman Campagna. Study, Oil on paper mounted on carboard, Nationalmuseum, Stockholm

In the park of Ariccia, paper on canvas, Staatliche Kunsthalle Karlsruhe
