= The Worried Lover =

Painting by Antoine Watteau

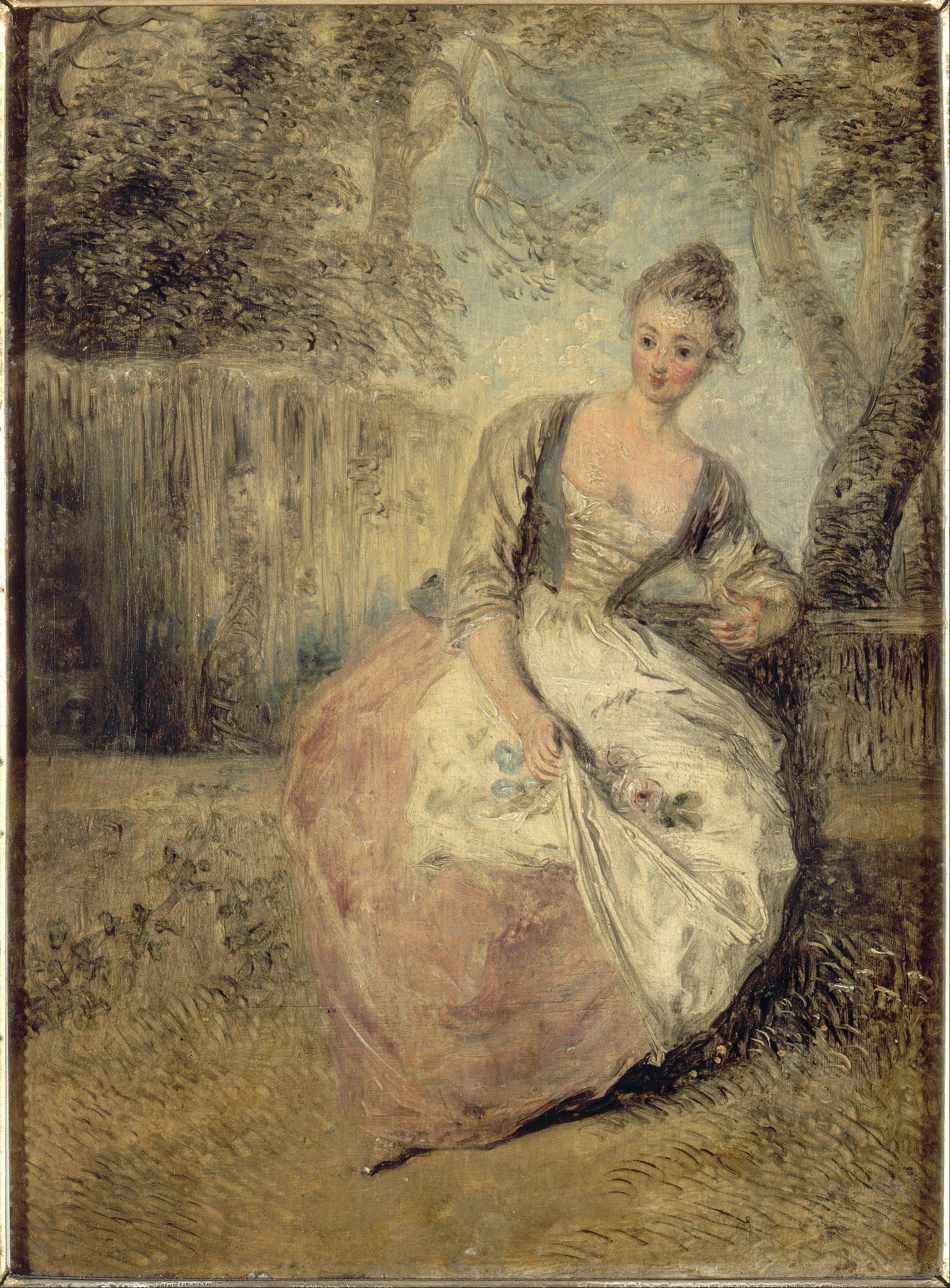
- Artist: Antoine Watteau
- Year: c. 1715-1720
- Catalogue: H 48 (49); G 81; DV 165; R 95; HA 127; EC 211; F B34; RM 225; RT 115
- Medium: oil on panel
- Dimensions: 24 cm × 17.5 cm (9.4 in × 6.9 in)
- Location: Musée Condé, Chantilly
- Accession: PE 372

The Worried Lover (L'Amante inquiète) (Note: As common case within Watteau's body of work, the painting has no author title; its traditional French naming is derived from Pierre-Alexandre Aveline's print. In the Duke of Aumale's inventory, the painting was listed as L'Attente. Montagni 1968, p. 122, translated into English as Camesasca 1971, pp. 125–126, cat. no. 211, and Zeri 2000, p. 47, list the painting as Girl with Roses (Ragazza con rose). Grasselli, Rosenberg & Parmantier 1984, pp. 38, 78, 228, 235, 304–306, 365, adapts the original French title into English as The Anxious Lover.) is an oil on panel painting in the Musée Condé, Chantilly, by the French Rococo artist Antoine Watteau. Variously dated to c. 1715–1720, the painting was among private collections throughout the 18th and 19th centuries, until it has been acquired by Henri d'Orleans, Duke of Aumale, son of King Louis Philippe I; as part of the Duke of Aumale's collection at the Château de Chantilly, The Worried Lover was bequeathed to the Institut de France in 1884.

At 24 by 17.5 cm, the painting is a case of small, single-figure, and full-length composition showing a costumed character, often in Watteau's art; it shows a seated young woman amid a landscape, dressed in pastoral attire, and holding a set of the cut roses, viewed by authors as a symbol of consumed love. With slight differences, the woman's figure has been adapted by Watteau from a double sanguine drawing, in which a study exactly matches the pose of the woman in the painting; Watteau also made an etching showing a woman seated in a very similar pose. In light of its provenance, The Worried Lover was related to two other paintings by Watteau, The Chord and The Dreamer.

== Provenance and dating ==
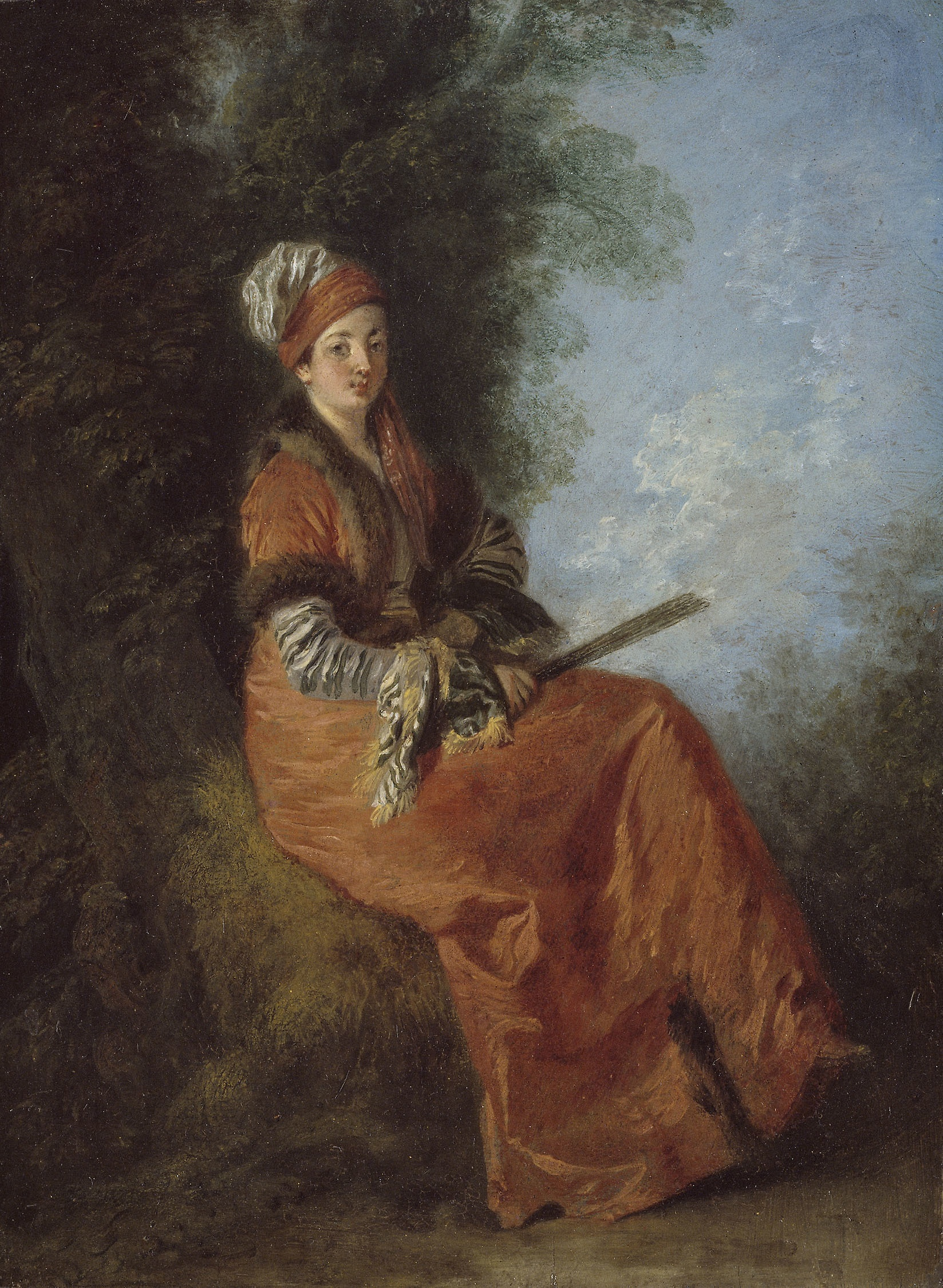
Watteau, The Dreamer, c. 1712–1717, Art Institute, Chicago

The earliest known owner of The Worried Lover was the Abbé Pierre-Maurice Haranger (ca. 1655–1735), canon of the Saint-Germain-l'Auxerrois who was one of Watteau's closest friends, inheriting a large number of the artist's drawings on his death. In 1729, the painting was published by Edme-François Gersaint as an etching made by Pierre-Alexandre Aveline; Aveline also etched another Watteau painting owned by the Abbé Haranger, The Dreamer. Though the prints don't mention the Abbé's ownership, Pierre-Jean Mariette confirms that in his manuscripts, and so does the fact that as part of the Recueil Jullienne, The Worried Lover and The Dreamer were printed on the same sheet. Given the appearance in the Recueil Jullienne and shared provenance, some authors considered both paintings to be pendants; contrary to that point, Pierre Rosenberg stated that these were likely brought together in the Abbé's collection. It has also been presumed that The Worried Lover was no. 33 in Abbé Haranger's inventory published in 1985, though the overall vagueness of the inventory makes that description elusive.

In the 1780s, The Worried Lover resurfaced in the collection of Antoine Claude Chariot (1733-1815), the commissaire-priseur du Châtelet; along with another Watteau painting in the Chariot collection, The Chord, it was lot 44 sold at auction for 221 livres in January 1788 to the painter and art dealer Jean-Baptiste-Pierre Lebrun (1748-1813), the husband of the prominent portrait painter Élisabeth Vigée Le Brun. Lebrun didn't keep the pair for long; he put it on sale in November 1791, only to have them bought back for 132 livres. The pair appeared as lot 25 at a later auction in February 1792, before resurfacing in the mid-19th century as part of the collection of Marquis André Joseph Maison (1798–1869), son of the prominent general and diplomat Nicolas Joseph Maison. Part of that collection was then bought in 1868 by Henri d'Orléans, Duke of Aumale, the fifth son of King Louis Philippe I, during his English exile; upon his return to France, the Duke of Aumale hung it in the salle Caroline of his château de Chantilly, where it remains as part of the Musée Condé collection.

Among Watteau scholars, The Worried Lover is dated from the middle to late years of the artist's career. In the late 19th and early 20th centuries, the painting was attributed by the Musée Condé curators to c. 1717–1720. in a 1912 album and catalogue, the German historian Ernst Heinrich Zimmermann placed it to c. 1717, the year Watteau completed the Louvre version of The Embarkation for Cythera. In the 1950 catalogue raisonné, the Louvre staff curator Hélène Adhémar listed the painting as a Spring-Autumn 1716 work; in 1959, the painter and connoisseur Jacques Mathey had proposed a c. 1715 dating. In the 1968 catalogue raisonné, the Italian scholar Ettore Camesasca considered The Worried Lover a later work by Watteau, dating it c. 1720; Camesasca's dating is also used by Federico Zeri. in a later 1980 catalogue raisonné, the French historian Marianne Roland Michel dated the painting c. 1716–1718.

== Gallery ==
Related pictures
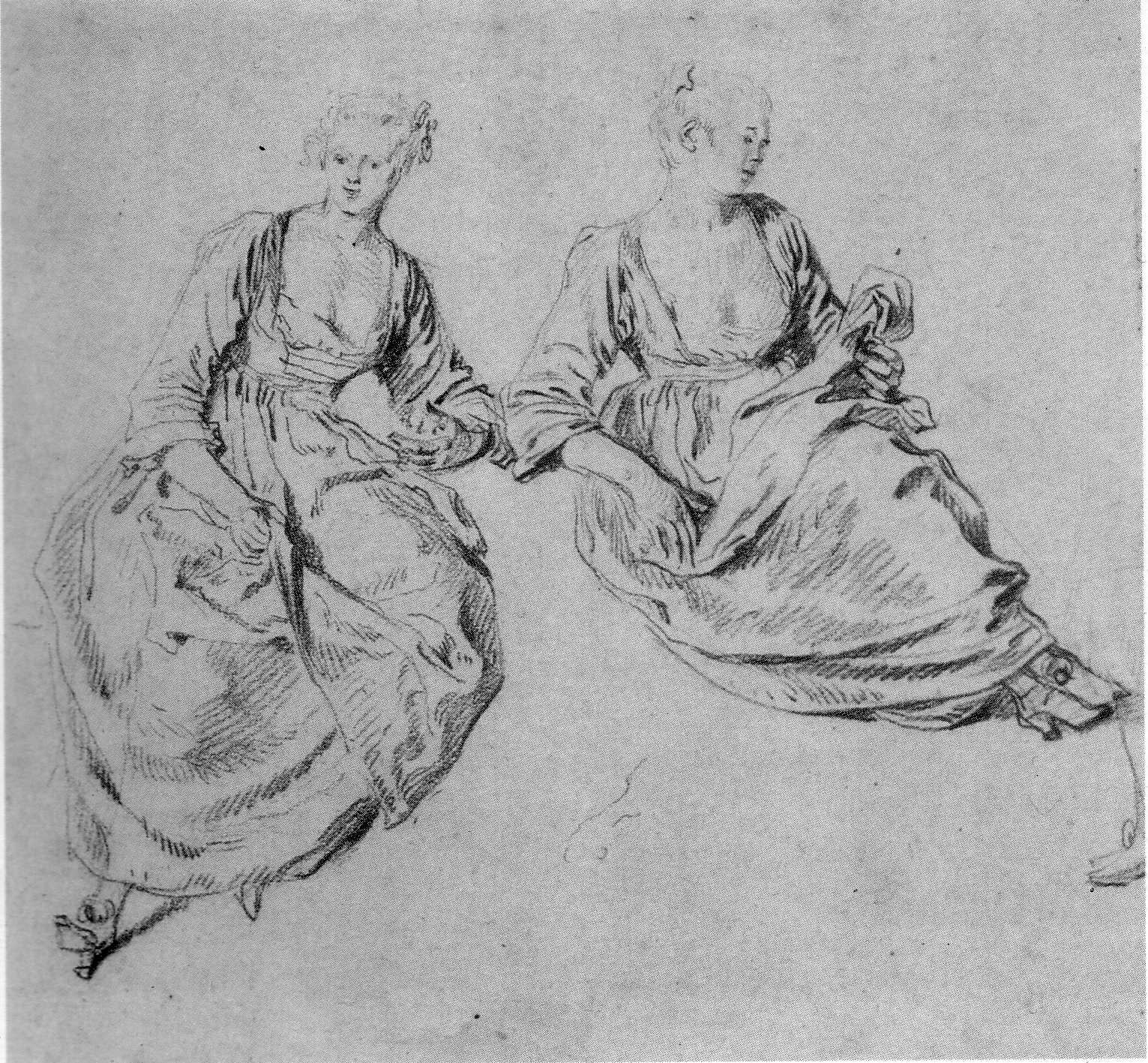
Watteau, Studies of a Seated Woman, c. 1712, sanguine, whereabouts unknown

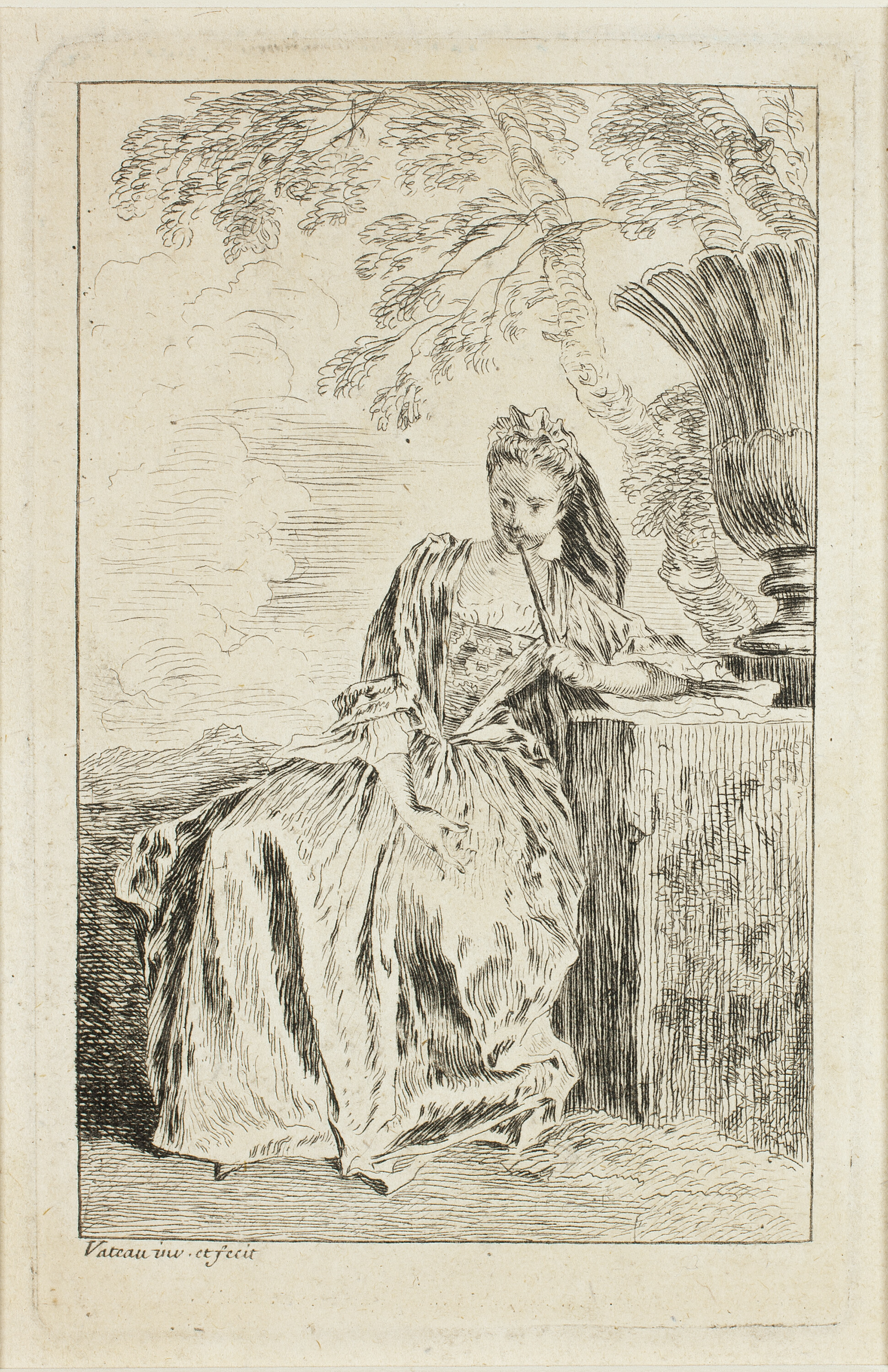
Watteau, Seated Woman, Leaning on a Pedestal, c. 1709–1710, etching, plate from Figures de mode, Art Institute, Chicago

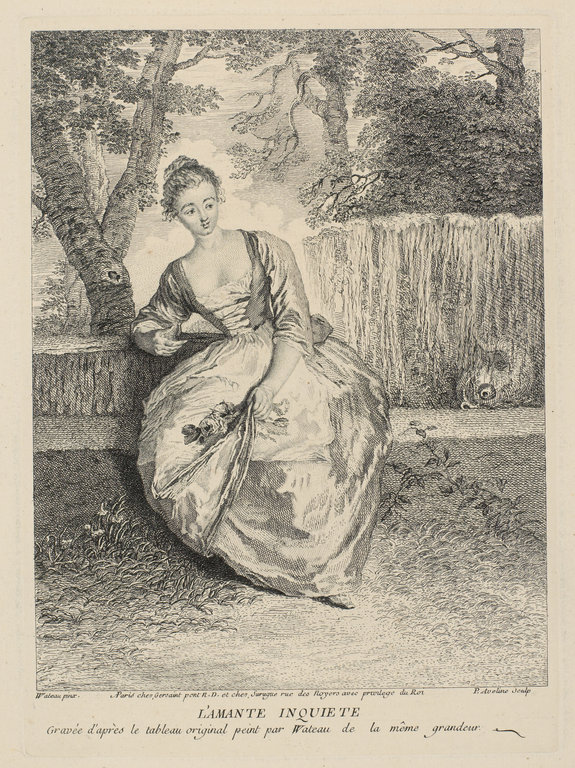
Pierre-Alexandre Aveline after Watteau, The Worried Lover, published in 1729, etching and engraving, Louvre, Paris

== Sources ==
- Adhémar, Hélène (1950). Watteau; sa vie, son oeuvre (in French). Includes "L’univers de Watteau", an introduction by René Huyghe. Paris: P. Tisné. pp. 57, 183, 216; pl. 67; cat. no. 127. OCLC 853537.
- Camesasca, Ettore [in Portuguese] (1971). The Complete Painting of Watteau. Classics of the World's Great Art. Introduction by John Sutherland. New York: Harry N. Abrams. pp. 125–126, cat. no. 211. ISBN 0-8109-5525-3. LCCN 77-92260. OCLC 143069 – via the Internet Archive.
- Dacier, Émile [in French]; Vuaflart, Albert (1922a). "Jean de Julienne et les graveurs de Watteau au XVIII-e siècle. II. Historique". Jean de Jullienne et les Graveurs de Watteau Au Xviii. Siècle (in French). Paris: M. Rousseau. pp. 29, 61, 83, 93, 131, 133 n. doi:10.11588/DIGLIT.41976. OCLC 1039156495.
- Dacier, Émile; Vuaflart, Albert (1922b). "Jean de Julienne et les graveurs de Watteau au XVIII-e siècle. III. Catalogue". Jean de Jullienne et les Graveurs de Watteau Au Xviii. Siècle (in French). Paris: M. Rousseau. pp. 81–82, 100; cat. no. 165. doi:10.11588/DIGLIT.41977. OCLC 1039156495.
- Eidelberg, Martin (August 2014). "L'Amante inquiète". A Watteau Abecedario. Archived from the original on April 23, 2020.
- Garnier-Pelle, Nicole (1995). Chantilly, musée Condé. Peintures du xviiie siècle. Inventaire des collections publiques de France (in French). Vol. 38. Paris: Réunion des musées nationaux. pp. 155–156, cat. no. 113. ISBN 2-7118-3285-6. OCLC 33264438.
- Grasselli, Margaret Morgan; Rosenberg, Pierre; Parmantier, Nicole; et al. (1984). Watteau, 1684-1721; National Gallery of Art, June 17—September 23, 1984; Galeries Nationales du Grand Palais, Paris, October 23, 1984—January 28, 1985; Schloss Charlottenburg, Berlin, February 22—May 26, 1985 (PDF). Washington: National Gallery of Art. ISBN 0-89468-074-9. LCCN 84-4918. OCLC 557740787 – via the National Gallery of Art archive.
- Gruyer, François-Anatole (1898). La peinture au chateau de Chantilly. Vol. 2: École française (in French). Paris: Plon-Nourrit. pp. 269–272, cat. no. CXVI. OCLC 1048229654 – via the Internet Archive.
- Gruyer, François-Anatole (1899). Chantilly, Musée Condé. Notice des peintures (in French). Paris: Braun, Clément et cie. pp. 346, 349, cat. no. 372 – via the Internet Archive.
- Hédouin, Pierre (November 30, 1845). "Watteau: catalogue de son oeuvre". L'Artiste (in French). pp. 78–80 – via Gallica. p. 79, cat. no. 48
- Hédouin, Pierre (1856). Mosaïque. Peintres, musiciens, littérateurs, artistes dramatiques à partir du 15e siècle jusqu'à nos jours (in French). Paris: Heugel. p. 99, cat. no. 49. OCLC 1157159285 – via the Internet Archive.
- "Inventaire après décès du chanoine Haranger, 17 mai 1735". Revue de l'Art (in French). 69 (69): 62–68. 1985. doi:10.3406/rvart.1985.347525. ISBN 2-222-96-415-6. ISSN 0035-1326 – via Persee.fr.
- Mathey, Jacques (1959). Antoine Watteau. Peintures réapparues inconnues ou négligées par les historiens (in French). Paris: F. de Nobele. p. 68. OCLC 954214682.
- Montagni, E. C. (1968). L'opera completa di Watteau. Classici dell'arte (in Italian). Vol. 21. Introduction by Giovanni Macchia. Milano: Rizzoli. p. 122; cat. no. 211. OCLC 1006284992. For the English edition, see Camesasca 1971
- Posner, Donald (1984). Antoine Watteau. London: Weidenfeld & Nicolson. p. 123. ISBN 0-8014-1571-3. LCCN 84-164937. OCLC 1147993782 – via the Internet Archive.
- Roland Michel, Marianne (1984). Watteau: an Artist of the Eighteenth Century. London: Trefoil. pp. 55, 156, 265, 269, 306, pl. 335. ISBN 0-86294-049-4. OCLC 1302554747 – via the Internet Archive.
- Rosenberg, Pierre; Prat, Louis-Antoine (1996). Antoine Watteau : catalogue raisonné des dessins (in French). Paris: Gallimard-Electa. vol. 1, pp. 252–253, cat. no. 162. ISBN 2-07-015043-7. OCLC 463981169.
- Zeri, Federico (2000) [first published in Italian in 1998]. Watteau: The Embarkment for Cythera. One Hundred Paintings. Richmond Hill, Ontario: NDE Pub. p. 47. ISBN 1553210182. LCCN 2001339949. OCLC 48003550 – via the Internet Archive.
- Zimmermann, E. Heinrich [in German] (1912). Watteau: des Meisters Werke in 182 Abbildungen. Klassiker der Kunst (in German). Vol. 21. Stuttgart, Leipzig: Deutsche Verlags-Anstalt. pp. 16, 186. OCLC 561124140.
