= Greece on the Ruins of Missolonghi =

1826 painting by Delacroix

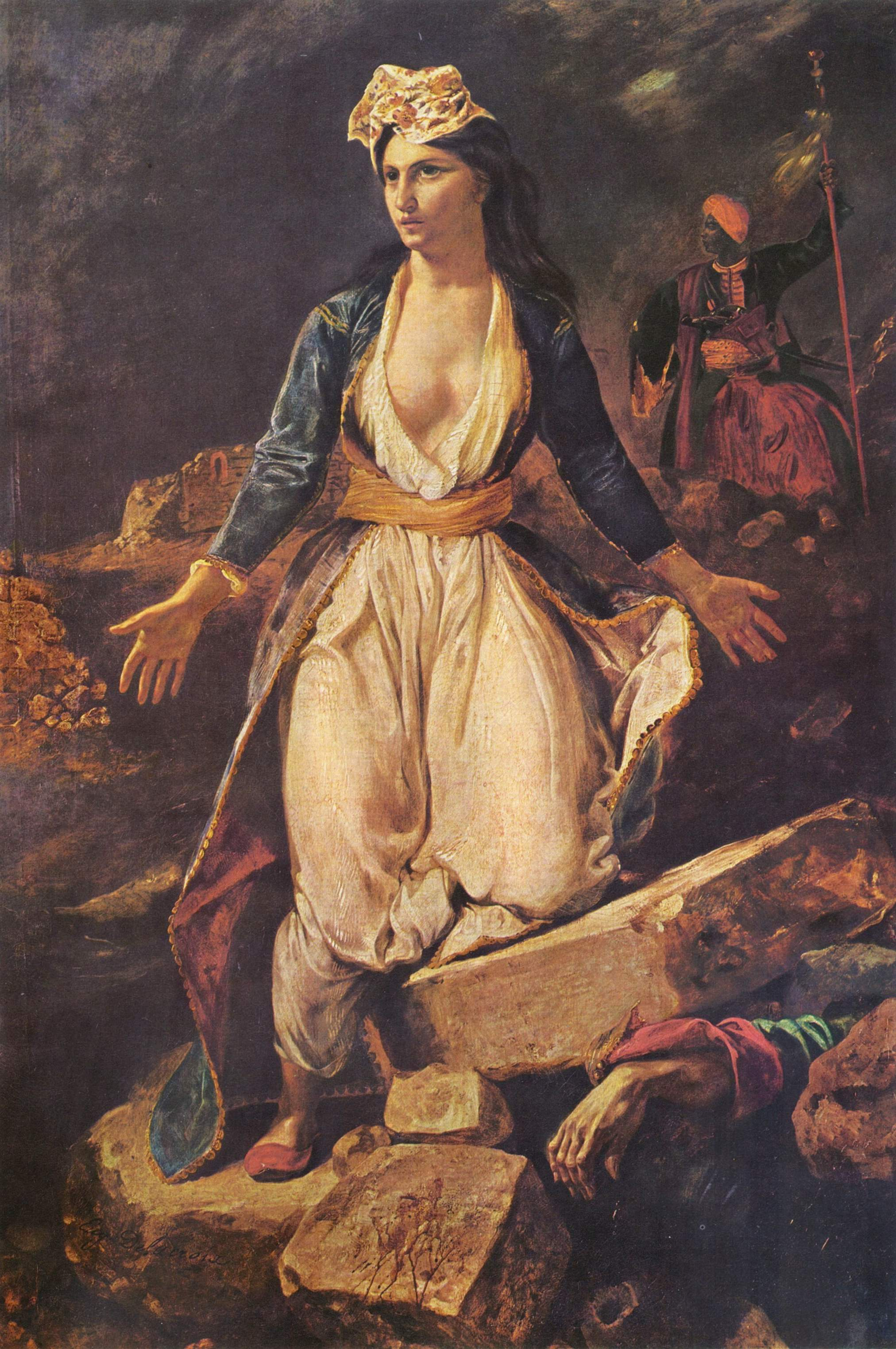
- Artist: Eugène Delacroix
- Year: 1826
- Medium: Oil on canvas
- Dimensions: 2.09 m × 1.47 m (82 in × 58 in)
- Location: Musée des Beaux-Arts de Bordeaux, Bordeaux

Greece on the Ruins of Missolonghi (French: La Grèce sur les ruines de Missolonghi) is an 1826 oil painting by French painter Eugène Delacroix, now preserved at the Musée des Beaux-Arts de Bordeaux. It was first exhibited at the Galerie Lebrun in 1826 with later exhibitions at Hobday's Gallery in London in 1828 and the Musée Colbert in Paris in 1829. It is likely that the painting was finished between the middle of June and the middle of August of 1826, although the exact date is unknown.

The painting serves as an allegorical painting of Greece's struggle for independence and resistance against the Ottomans, specifically the fall of Missolonghi after the Turks besieged the town.

== Context ==
The Turks surrounded Missolonghi on the Gulf of Patras after having tried several times to retake the territory following the 1821 Greek insurrection. While the Greeks held out for almost a year, disease and famine ultimately resulted in a Turkish victory.

Three days after the Turks entered on the night of April 22, 1826, the remaining defenders of Greece fired at the mines located in Missolonghi, resulting in an explosion and deaths of both Greeks and Turks.

== Analysis ==
The work depicts a woman dressed in a disordered blue robe with gold details (often used to depict Greece in many of Delacroix's works), a white underdress, and scarf-like headwear. The figure was likely meant to serve as an allegorical figure of Greece, representing "Hellenic Beauty" and motherhood. The allegorical figure is depicted as half-kneeling on the rubble of the explosion, her arms spread out in an expression of despair. The hand of a corpse can be seen emerging from under the rubble, beneath her feet. In the background, a dark-complexioned man wearing a yellow turban, who symbolizes the enemy, is planting a flag in the ground.

The painting was meant to symbolize the atmosphere and mood of the Greek struggle at the time, with the allegorical figure's tear-stained expression and dress in a disarray as she stands among the ruins of Missolonghi and the human remains. The gloomy color palette further helps to capture the despair of Greece's defeat. The allegorical figure's stance and expression can also be interpreted as representing Greece pleading with Europe for assistance in the face of exhaustion.

The painting can also be interpreted as borrowing elements from Christianity, building off of concepts of city and motherhood meeting. The victorious and "exotic" soldier in the background to the right represents a Turk or Egyptian soldier (since Egypt sent troops in support of the Turkish cause towards the end of the siege). This figure was meant to stand in contrast with the allegorical figure in the foreground, representing Islam and Christianity, respectively.

== French Romanticism ==
Visitors were expected to be shocked by the painting and experience an appeal to humane and civic responsibility, with the painting depicting the horrors and violence of war. The severed hand and the rubble from the explosion serve as reminders of the reality of massacres and wars.

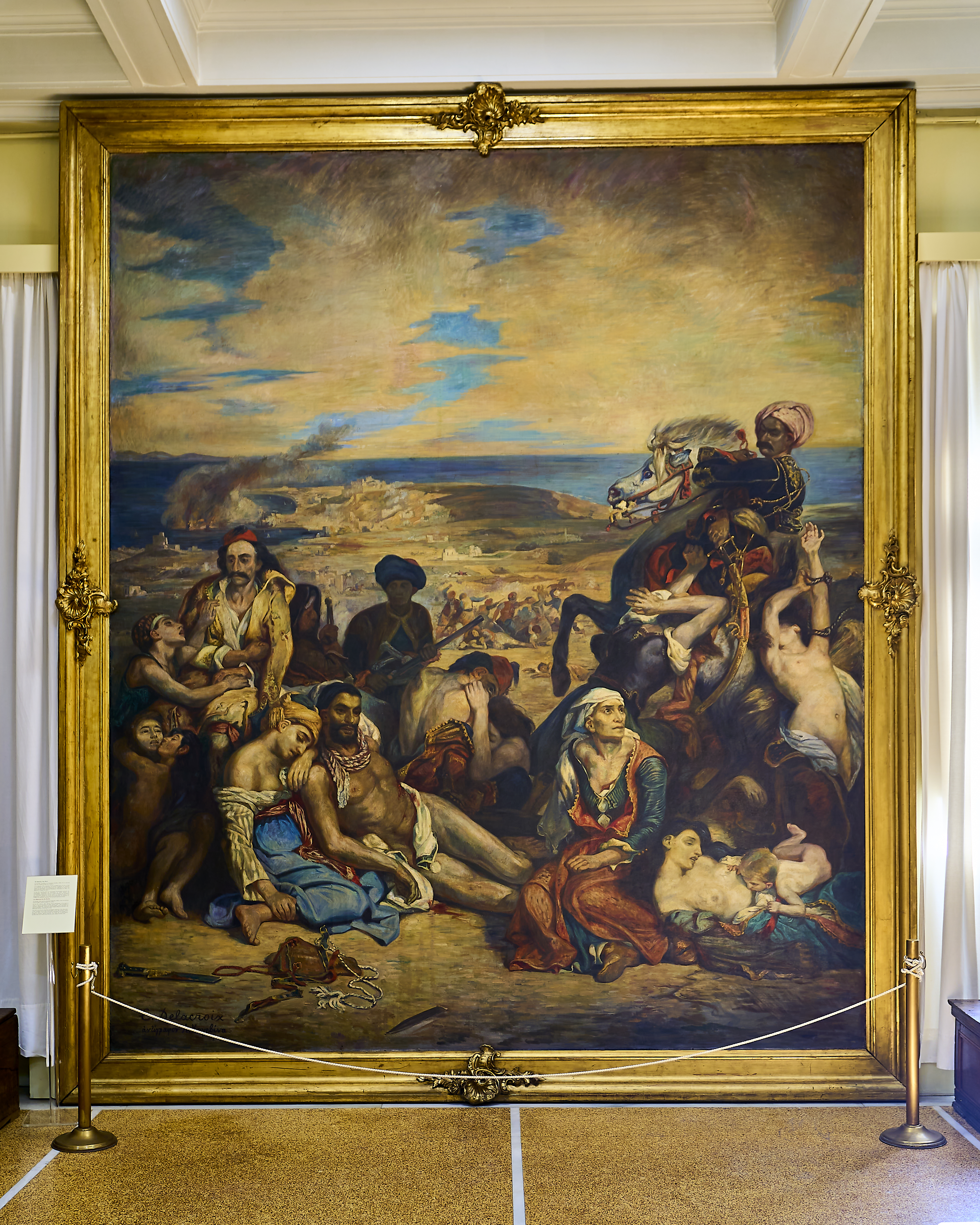
The Massacre at Chios in the National Historical Museum of Athens

Delacroix's Romantic approach to the subject was largely unappreciated by the audience at the time, which preferred works with narrative clarity.

== Connection to Massacres of Chios ==
This painting's themes of slavery and the Greek struggle for independence from the Ottomans built on his earlier painting depicting the Massacres at Chios. The two paintings can be understood as a narrative sequence, with Greece on the Ruins of Missolonghi representing the conclusion of the Massacre at Chios.

In Greece on the Ruins of Missolonghi, the allegorical figure representing Greece and the soldier-like figure in the background representing Turkey/Egypt have been interpreted by Darcy Grimaldo Grigsby as standing for slavery and freedom, respectively.
