= Jean-Baptiste-Pierre Lebrun =

French painter and art collector (1748–1813)

Jean-Baptiste-Pierre Le Brun
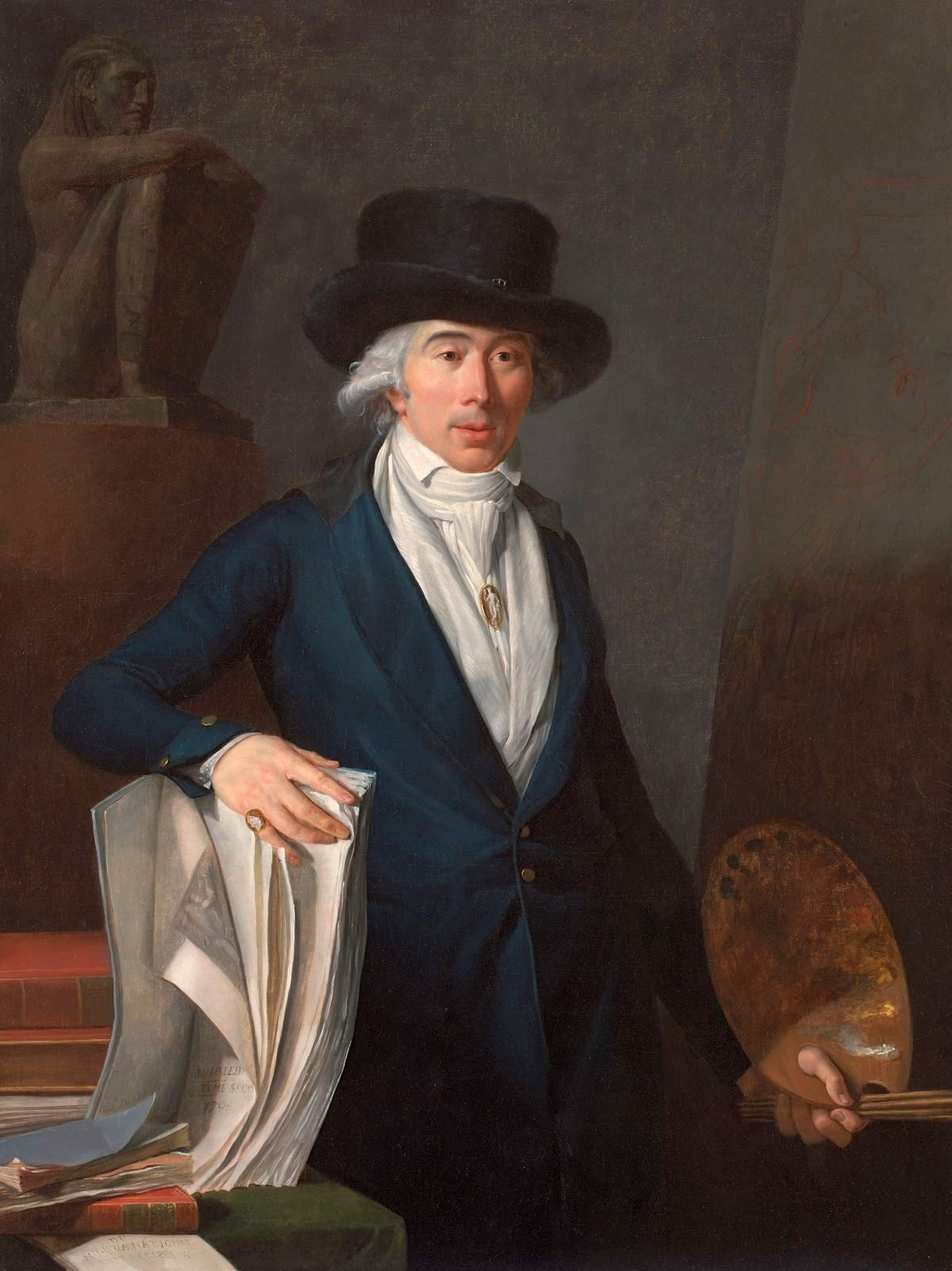
- Self-Portrait, c. 1795, private collection
- Born: 1748; Paris, France
- Died: 7 August 1813; Paris, France
- Occupation: Painter
- Spouse: Élisabeth Vigée (m. 1776; div. 1794)
- Children: Julie Le Brun

Jean-Baptiste-Pierre Le Brun (1748 – 7 August 1813) was a French painter, art collector and art dealer. Simon Denis was his pupil.

== Life ==
Born in Paris, he was the son of the painter Pierre Le Brun (1704–1771), who was himself a great-nephew to the renowned painter of King Louis XIV's reign, Charles Le Brun. From 1775 onwards he became one of the main art dealers and painting experts in Paris, specialising in restoring old masters, particularly Dutch ones, and publishing catalogues of them for commercial purposes. His own collection included Ochtervelt's Street Musicians at the Door and later an Immaculate Conception by Bartolomé Esteban Murillo.

His first marriage was in the Netherlands, before a second marriage on 11 January 1776 at Saint-Eustache, Paris to Élisabeth Louise Vigée. He had first met her the previous year, becoming her agent and eventually proposing marriage – the marriage was discouraged due to his reputation as a rake and a gambler but she accepted nonetheless. They had one child, Jeanne Julie Louise Lebrun, who in 1800 married Gaëtan Bertrand Nigris, director of the Imperial Theatre in Saint Petersburg.

In 1778 he bought the former Palais Lubert on rue de Cléry in Paris. Ten years later he opened the "Salle Le Brun" (or Galerie Le Brun), a neoclassically decorated gallery and saleroom for antiquities and paintings by Jean-Baptiste Greuze, Jean-Honoré Fragonard and other artists, including Antoine Watteau's The Worried Lover and The Chord. The gallery invented "a new architecture, that of an auction room with overhead lighting". One of his prominent clients was Pierre Victor, baron de Besenval de Brunstatt, who furnished his residence in Paris, the Hôtel de Besenval, with the help of Jean-Baptiste-Pierre Le Brun. Furthermore, Élisabeth Vigée Le Brun portrayed the Baron de Besenval's illegitimate son Joseph-Alexandre Pierre de Ségur, Viscount of Ségur, who was also a regular private guest at Élisabeth Vigée Le Brun's house.

Le Brun's wife sold her portraits there for 12,000 francs, but received only 6 francs, with her husband pocketing the rest – as she wrote in her Souvenirs "He was so unconcerned about money that he hardly knew its value". In 1781 he and his wife travelled to Brussels to buy works at the sale of the fallen governor Prince Charles Alexander of Lorraine.

The early years of the French Revolution saw the collapse of the art market, forcing Lebrun to sell his collection in 1791. He became a supporter of the Revolution, though his wife remained a monarchist and left France in autumn 1789. The new government called on him to appraise and catalogue the artworks it had seized from churches and from émigrés. Wishing to take part in setting up a national museum in the Louvre Palace, he retired from the museum commission and entered discussions with the Minister of the Interior Jean-Marie Roland de la Platière.

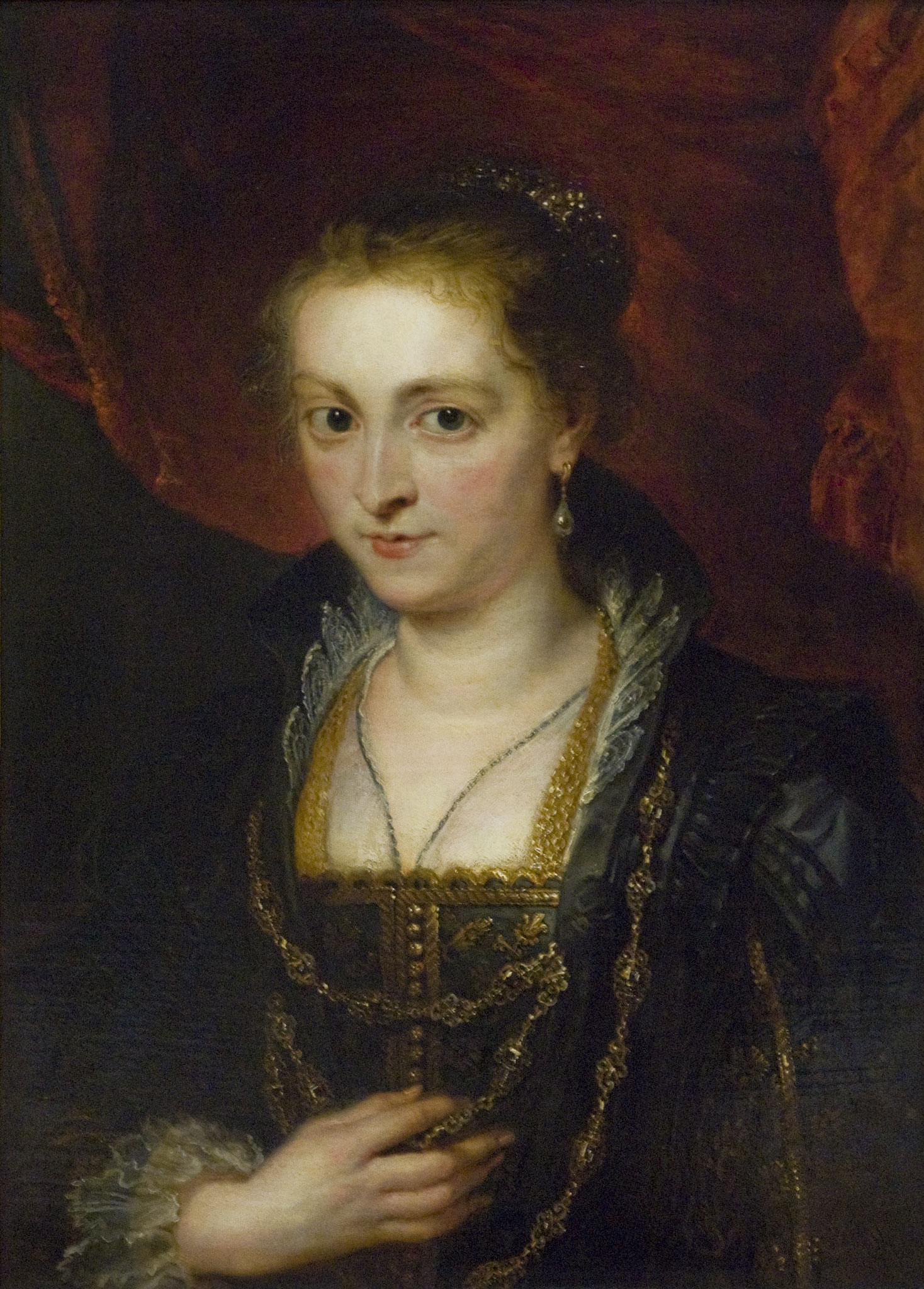
Peter Paul Rubens, Suzanne Fourment, c. 1625; bought by Lebrun for the Louvre in 1793

On la Platière's resignation on 23 January 1793 and the Girondists' departure, Robespierre took power and was also favourable to the idea. The following month, Le Brun bought several paintings for the Louvre with Jacques-Louis David's support but without the government's knowledge, including a Holy Family attributed to Rembrandt and Peter Paul Rubens' Portrait of Suzanne Fourment. His purchases totalled 30,000 livres at a time when the First Republic was in a budgetary crisis and so an annual acquisitions budget was set for the Louvre to avoid a repeat of the situation. He was one of the businessmen who worked with the count of Angiviller to augment the royal collections which served as the nucleus for the new Louvre Museum. As a painter he also restored paintings for the Louvre.

In 1793 he made a failed attempt to have his wife removed from the list of émigrés, something which only eventually occurred in 1800. Publishing a pamphlet entitled Précis Historique de la Citoyenne Le Brun. He and his brother-in-law Étienne Vigée were both imprisoned for some months. Citing his wife's desertion, Jean-Baptiste-Pierre was divorced from her in 1794 to protect and preserve his own assets.

He became indispensable to the running of the new Louvre and continued producing catalogues of émigrés' collections, distinguishing between works that should end up in national collections and works that could be sold off to produce income for the state. He published Observations sur le Museum national : pour servir de suite aux réflexions qu'il a déjà publiées sur le même objet in 1793, laying the foundations for the future organisation and collections of the Louvre Museum.

In 1795 he was made the museum's expert curator, organising the galleries into Italian, French and North European works. As an assistant to the arts commission, he also published Essai sur les moyens d'encourager la peinture, la sculpture, l'architecture et la gravure ... in 1794–1795, but Napoleon's rise to power led to Le Brun's departure from the National Museum. He failed to return to the Parisian art market, pushing him into debt, and on 14 January 1807 he was forced to sell the Salle Le Brun and the mansion to his ex-wife, an excellent business-woman. He died in Paris in 1813.

== Works ==
- Le Brun, Jean-Baptiste-Pierre (1793). Observations sur le Museum national : pour servir de suite aux réflexions qu'il a déjà publiées sur le même objet (in French). Paris.
- Le Brun, Jean-Baptiste-Pierre (1794–1795). Essai sur les moyens d'encourager la peinture, la sculpture, l'architecture et la gravure par J.B.P. Le Brun, peintre et marchand de tableaux, adjoint à la Commission temporaire des Arts. Paris.
- Le Brun, Jean-Baptiste-Pierre (1794). Quelques idées sur la disposition, l'arrangement et la décoration du Muséum national. Paris: De l'imprimerie de Didot jeune.
- Le Brun, Jean-Baptiste-Pierre (1802). Catalogue de tableaux des plus grands maîtres des trois écoles... de dessins montés de différens maîtres, des terres cuites ... et autres objets, dont une partie provenant de feu M. Laborde de Méréville par J.-B.-P. Le Brun, peintre, commissaire, expert honoraire du Musée Napoléon. Paris.

== Bibliography ==
- (in French) Gilberte, Émile-Mâle (1956), « Jean-Baptiste-Pierre Lebrun (1748–1813) - Son rôle dans l'histoire de la restauration des tableaux du Louvre », Mémoires de la Fédération des sociétés historiques et archéologiques de Paris et de l'Île-de-France VIII, 371–417.
- Edwards, Lynn (1998), « Le Brun, Jean-Baptiste-Pierre », Grove Art Online (Oxford University Press) ISBN 978-1-884446-05-4.
