= The Chord (painting) =

Painting by Antoine Watteau

- L'Accord, Le Donneur de sérénades (French)
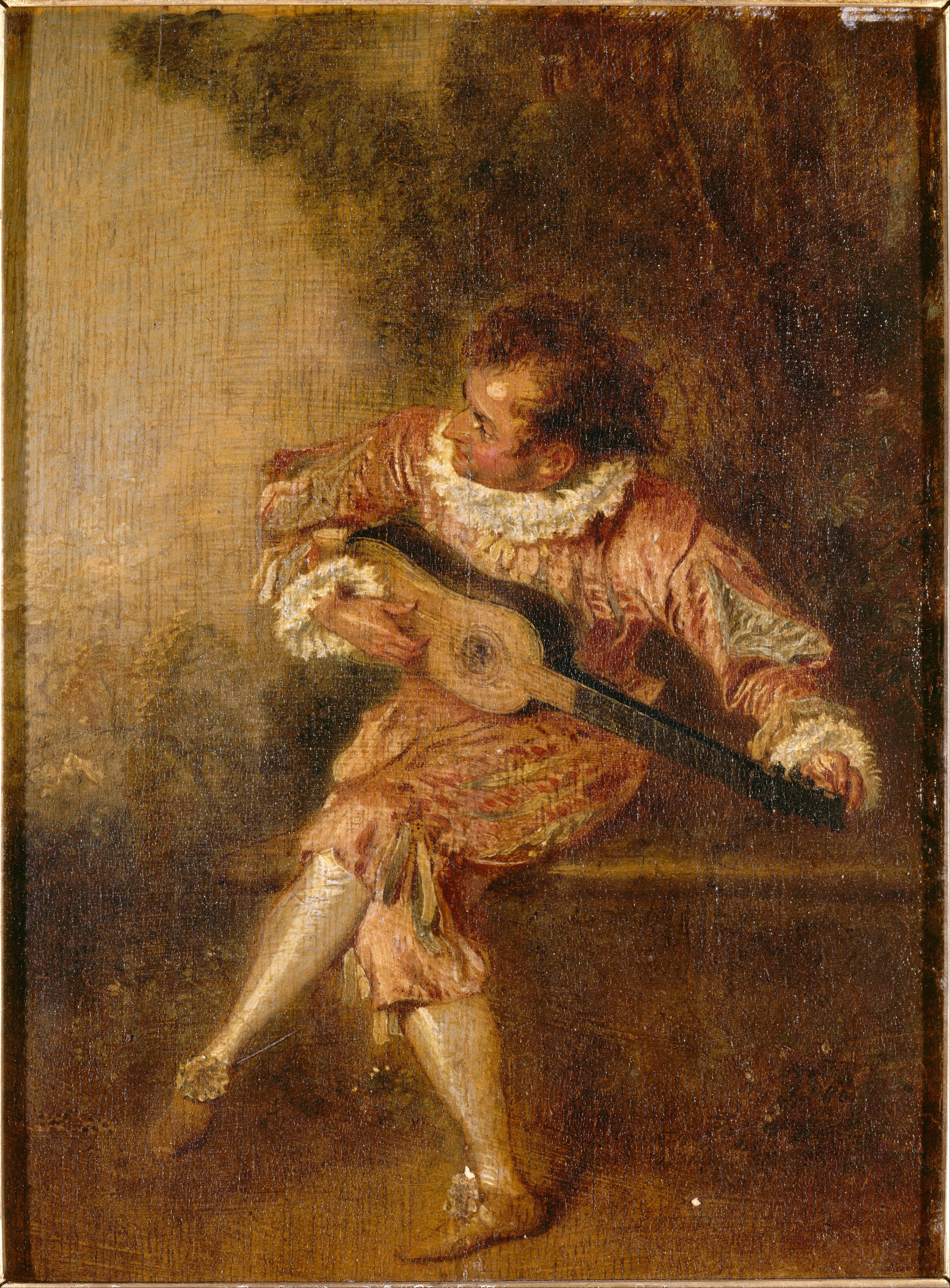
- Artist: Antoine Watteau
- Year: c. 1714–1717; See § Provenance
- Catalogue: G 81; DV 215; R 94; HA 144; EC 130; F A10; RM 170; RT 58
- Medium: oil on panel
- Dimensions: 24 cm × 17 cm (9.4 in × 6.7 in)
- Location: Musée Condé, Chantilly
- Accession: PE 371

The Chord (L'Accord), also known as The Serenader (Le Donneur de sérénades) and Mezzetino (Mézetin), is an oil on panel painting in the Musée Condé, Chantilly, by the French Rococo painter Antoine Watteau, variously dated c. 1714–1717. Throughout the 18th and 19th centuries, The Chord passed through numerous private collections, until it came into possession of Henri d'Orléans, Duke of Aumale, son of King Louis Philippe I; as part of the Duke of Aumale's collection at the Château de Chantilly, The Chord was bequeathed to the Institut de France in 1884.

At 24 by 17 cm, the painting forms a single-figure full-length composition that depicts a male guitarist in theatrical costume, sitting amid the landscape. The guitarist, widely associated with the commedia dell'arte character Mezzetino, is a recurring subject in Watteau's art; based on a red and black chalk drawing owned by the Louvre, it is also present in two other paintings by Watteau, The Surprise (now in the Getty Museum, Los Angeles) and Pleasures of Love (now in the Alte Meister Gallery, Dresden).

== Provenance ==
The recorded provenance of The Chord begins in the mid-18th century, when it was in possession of the fermier géneral Marin Delahaye (1684–1753); at the sale after his death, held in Paris on January 1, 1754, the painting was lot 47, described as "un tableau peint sur bois, représentant Mezetin par Vatteau, de 10 pouces de haut sur 7 pouces de large, dans sa bordure dorée," and sold for 300 livres to the certain Beauchamp. Soon after that sale, it entered the collection of the painter and art dealer Jean-Baptiste-Pierre Lebrun (1748-1813), the husband of the prominent portrait painter Élisabeth Vigée Le Brun; Lebrun put The Chord on sale twice, as lot 58 at a May 1765 auction, and as lot 40 at a November 1778 auction respectively.

In the 1780s, the painting belonged to Antoine Claude Chariot (1733-1815), the commissaire-priseur du Châtelet; at a sale in January 1788, The Chord and another Watteau painting in the Chariot collection, The Worried Lover, were lot 44 sold back to Lebrun for 221 livres. Lebrun didn't keep the pair for long, and put it at auction on April 11, 1791, only to have them bought back for 132 livres. For a brief time, The Chord was owned by the art dealer Alexandre Joseph Paillet, and was sold as lot 25 at auction for 120 livres on February 13, 1792. Decades later, the painting resurfaced as lot 150 at auction in Paris on March 20–22, 1824, before entering the collection of Marquis André Joseph Maison (1798–1869), son of the prominent general and diplomat Nicolas Joseph Maison; with part of that collection, it was sold in 1868 to Henri d'Orléans, Duke of Aumale, the fifth son of King Louis Philippe I. As part of the Duke of Aumale's collection at the Château de Chantilly, The Chord was bequeathed to the Institut de France in 1884.

Among Watteau scholars, The Chord is generally attributed to the middle years of the artist's career. In the 1950 catalogue raisonné, the Louvre staff curator Hélène Adhémar listed the painting as a Spring-Summer 1716 work; in a 1959 study, the painter and connoisseur Jacques Mathey attributed it to c. 1714. In the 1968 catalogue raisonné, the Italian art historian Ettore Camesasca dated the painting c. 1715; in the 1980s, the French scholar Marianne Roland Michel suggested a ca. 1715–1716 dating. In 2002, Renaud Temperini gives a slightly later dating of ca. 1716–1717.

== Analysis ==
The Chord is an oil on panel painting, shaped as a vertical rectangle that measures 24 by 17 cm. It shows a full-length single figure of a male guitarist in a theatrical costume, seated tuning a guitar amid a landscape; the man's head, turned to the left, is barren. He wears a rose-colored coat and knee-britches slashed with yellow, embellished with blue ribbons and shoes with blue rosettes.

== Related works ==
The painting has often been confused with Mezzetin, a painting by Watteau held at the Metropolitan Museum of Art in New York, which also depicts the same character from the Italian theatre. However, the two characters do not have the same physique at all. Another Mezzetin by Watteau is kept at the Pierpont Morgan Library.

The preparatory drawing for the painting is kept in particular at the Rouen Museum of Fine Arts, other very similar drawings are kept at the Petit Palais Museum, the Louvre and formerly in the Bordeaux-Groult collection in Paris.

== Gallery ==
Related pictures
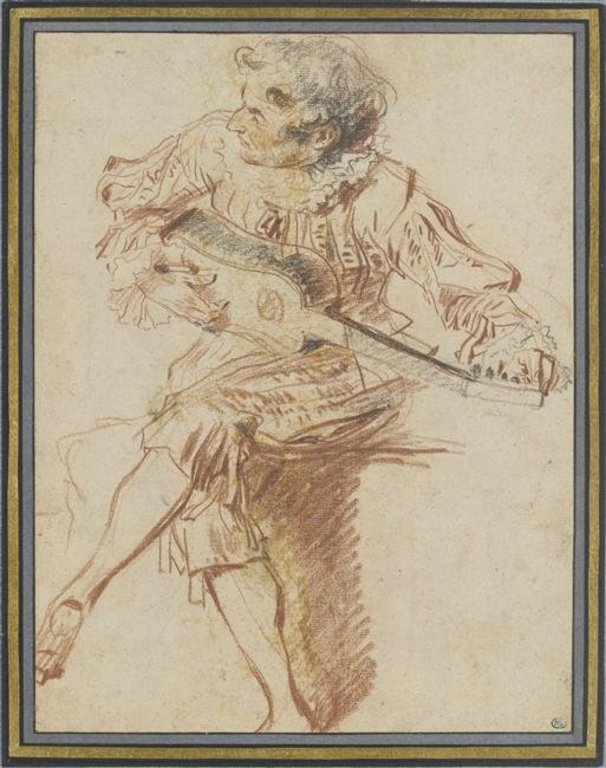
Watteau, Study of a Seated Guitarist, c. 1716, red and black chalk; Louvre, Paris

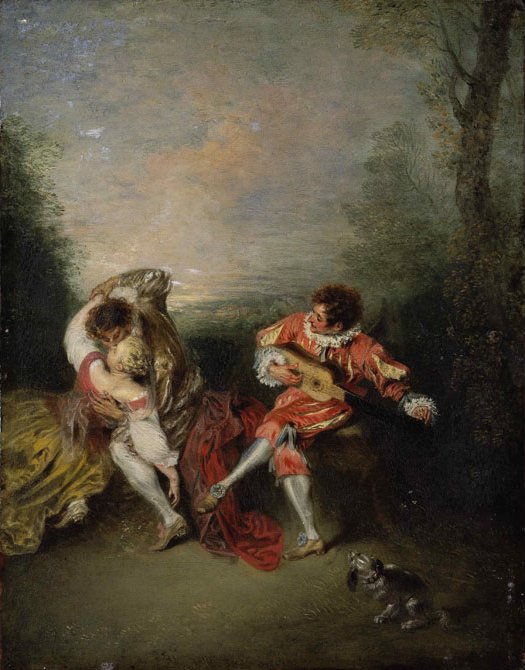
Watteau, The Surprise, ca. 1718, oil on panel; J. Paul Getty Museum, Los Angeles

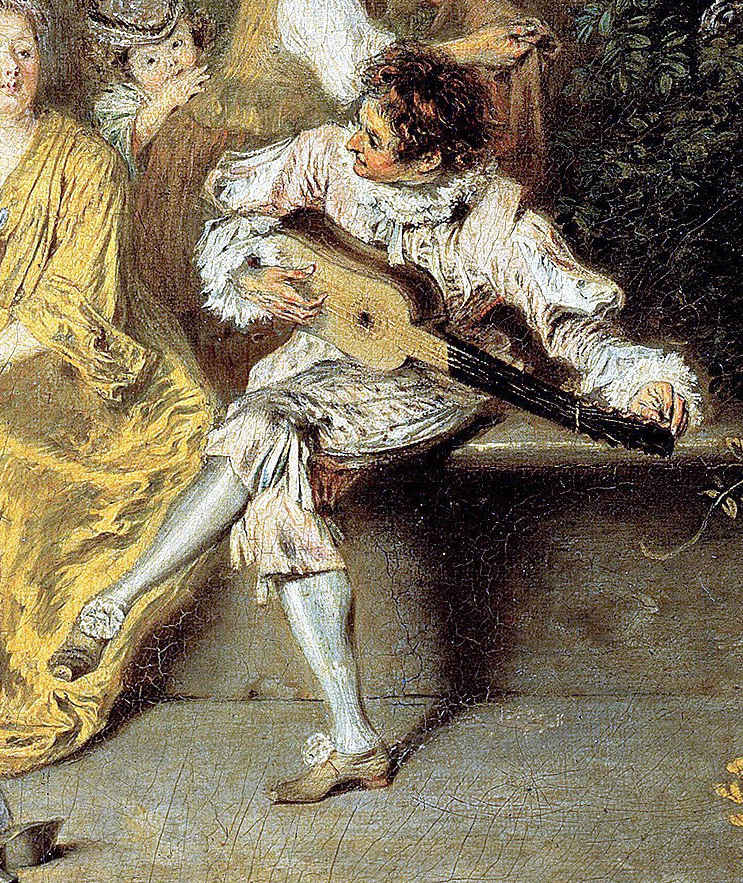
Watteau, detail of Pleasures of Love, ca. 1718–1719, oil on canvas; Alte Meister Gallery, Dresden

== Sources ==
- Adhémar, Hélène (1950). Watteau; sa vie, son oeuvre (in French). Includes "L’univers de Watteau", an introduction by René Huyghe. Paris: P. Tisné. pp. 28, 49, 119, 184, 219; cat. no. 144; pl. 76. OCLC 853537.
- Baetjer, Katharine, ed. (2009). Watteau, Music, and Theater. Rosenberg, Pierre (an introduction by); Cowart, Georgia J. (an essay by). New York: Metropolitan Museum of Art. pp. 42–44, under cat. no. 11. ISBN 978-1-58839-335-7.
- Camesasca, Ettore [in Portuguese] (1971). The Complete Paintings of Watteau. Classics of the World's Great Art. Introduction by John Sunderland. New York: Harry N. Abrams. p. 110, cat. no. 130, colorpl. IX. ISBN 0-8109-5525-3. LCCN 77-92260. OCLC 143069 – via the Internet Archive.
- Eidelberg, Martin (August 2020). "Le Donneur de sérénade". A Watteau Abecedario. Archived from the original on October 17, 2020.
- Garnier-Pelle, Nicole (1995). Chantilly, musée Condé. Peintures du xviiie siècle. Inventaire des collections publiques de France (in French). Vol. 38. Paris: Réunion des musées nationaux. pp. 152–154, cat. no. 112. OCLC 33264438.
- Gruyer, François-Anatole (1898). La peinture au chateau de Chantilly. Vol. 2: École française (in French). Paris: Plon-Nourrit. pp. 266–269, cat. no. CXV. OCLC 1048229654 – via the Internet Archive.
- Gruyer, François-Anatole (1899). Chantilly, Musée Condé. Notice des peintures. Paris: Braun, Clément et cie. pp. 345–346, cat. no. 371 – via the Internet Archive.
- Mathey, Jacques (1959). Antoine Watteau. Peintures réapparues inconnues ou négligées par les historiens (in French). Paris: F. de Nobele. p. 68. OCLC 954214682.
- Montagni, E. C. (1968). L'opera completa di Watteau. Classici dell'arte (in Italian). Vol. 21. Introduction by Giovanni Macchia. Milano: Rizzoli. p. 108; cat. no. 130, colorpl. IX. OCLC 1006284992. For the English edition, see Camesasca 1971.
- Roland Michel, Marianne (1980). Antoine Watteau: das Gesamtwerk (in German). Translated from the French by Rudolf Kimmig. Frankfurt: Ullstein. pp. 61–62; cat. no. 170. ISBN 3-548-36019-X. OCLC 69202887.
- Temperini, Renaud (2002). Watteau. Maîtres de l'art (in French). Paris: Gallimard. cat. no. 58. ISBN 2-07-011686-7. OCLC 300225840.
