= Julie Le Brun =

French artist (1780–1819)

- Portrait of Julie Le Brun, painted by her mother in 1789
- Born: Jeanne-Julie-Louise Le Brun; 12 February 1780; Paris, France
- Died: 8 December 1819 (aged 39); Paris, France
- Other names: Dlle Nigris; Brunette (nickname)
- Occupation: Painter
- Spouse: Gaëtan-Bernard Nigris (m. 1799)
- Parents: Jean-Baptiste-Pierre Le Brun (father); Élisabeth Vigée Le Brun (mother)
- Relatives: Louis Vigée (grandfather)

Jeanne-Julie-Louise Nigris (née Le Brun; 12 February 1780 – 8 December 1819), nicknamed "Brunette", was a painter and the daughter of painter Élisabeth Vigée. She also was the model for many of her mother's paintings.

== Life ==
Julie Le Brun was born on 12 February 1780 in Paris, France, to Jean-Baptiste-Pierre Le Brun and Élisabeth Vigée, also known as Madame Le Brun. When her parents separated in 1789, Julie travelled with her mother. Early in life she produced a number of pastels, including one after a piece by Jakob Orth.

Relations with her mother were strained from time to time, especially after her marriage to Gaëtan Bernard Nigris in 1799. The couple soon separated. Le Brun attempted to support herself with her art, appearing in 1811 under the name "Dlle Nigris" in an exhibit in the rue Saint-Lazare. She died at the age of 39 in 1819.

Despite their strained relationship, her mother wrote in her memoirs:

This blow [the death of her husband], however, was far less than the cruel grief I experienced at the death of my daughter. I hastened to her as soon as I heard of her illness, but the disease progressed rapidly, and I cannot tell what I felt when all hope of saving her was gone. When, going to see her the last day, my eyes fell upon that dreadfully sunken face, I fainted away. My old friend Mme. de Noisville rescued me from that bed of sorrow; she supported me, for my legs would not carry me, and took me home. The next day I was childless! Mme. de Verdun came with the news, and vainly tried to soften my despair. All the wrongdoing of the poor little one vanished—I saw her again, I still see her, in the days of her childhood. Alas! she was so young! Why did she not survive me?

== Gallery ==
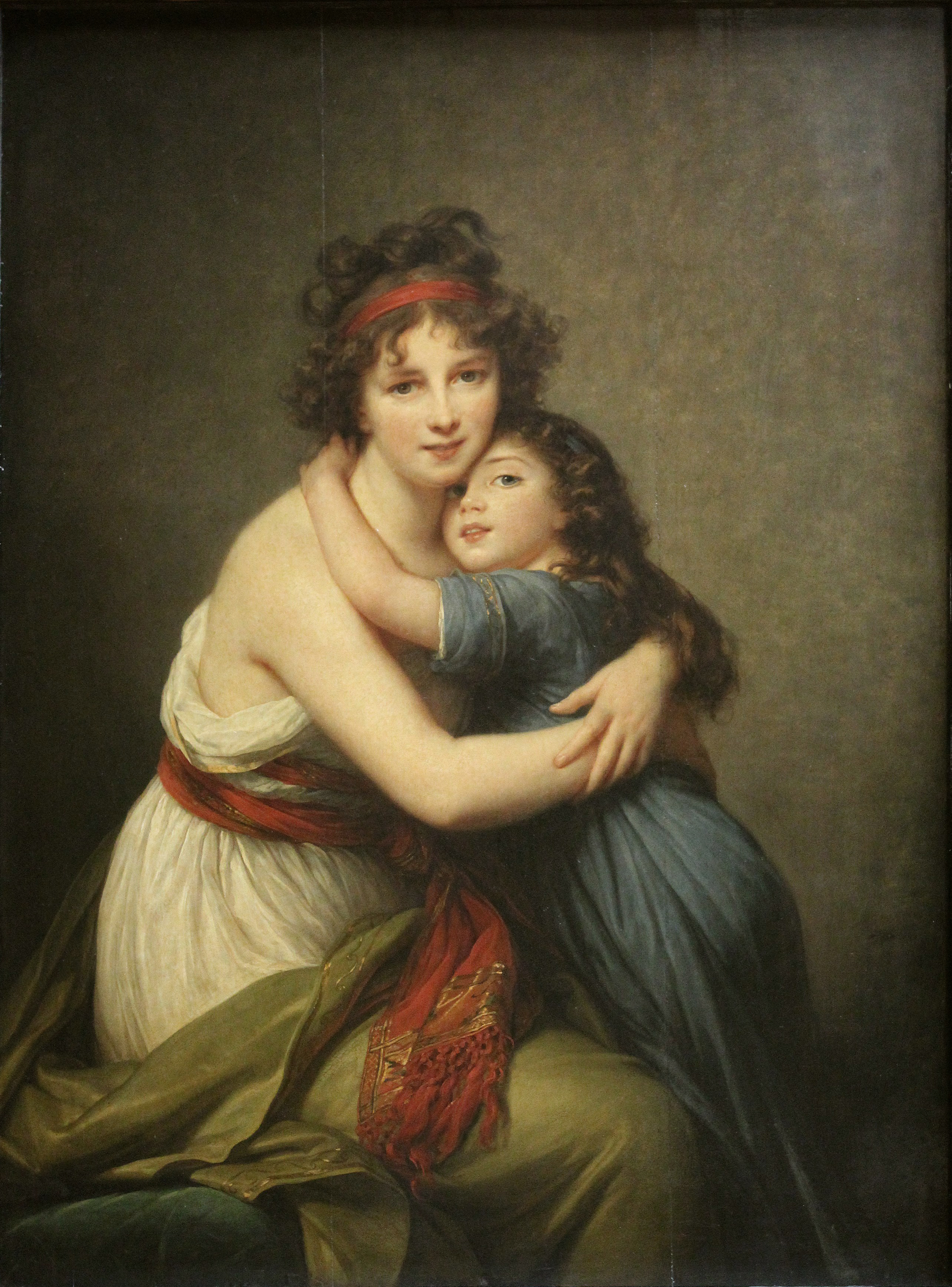
Self-portrait of Élisabeth Vigée Le Brun with her daughter

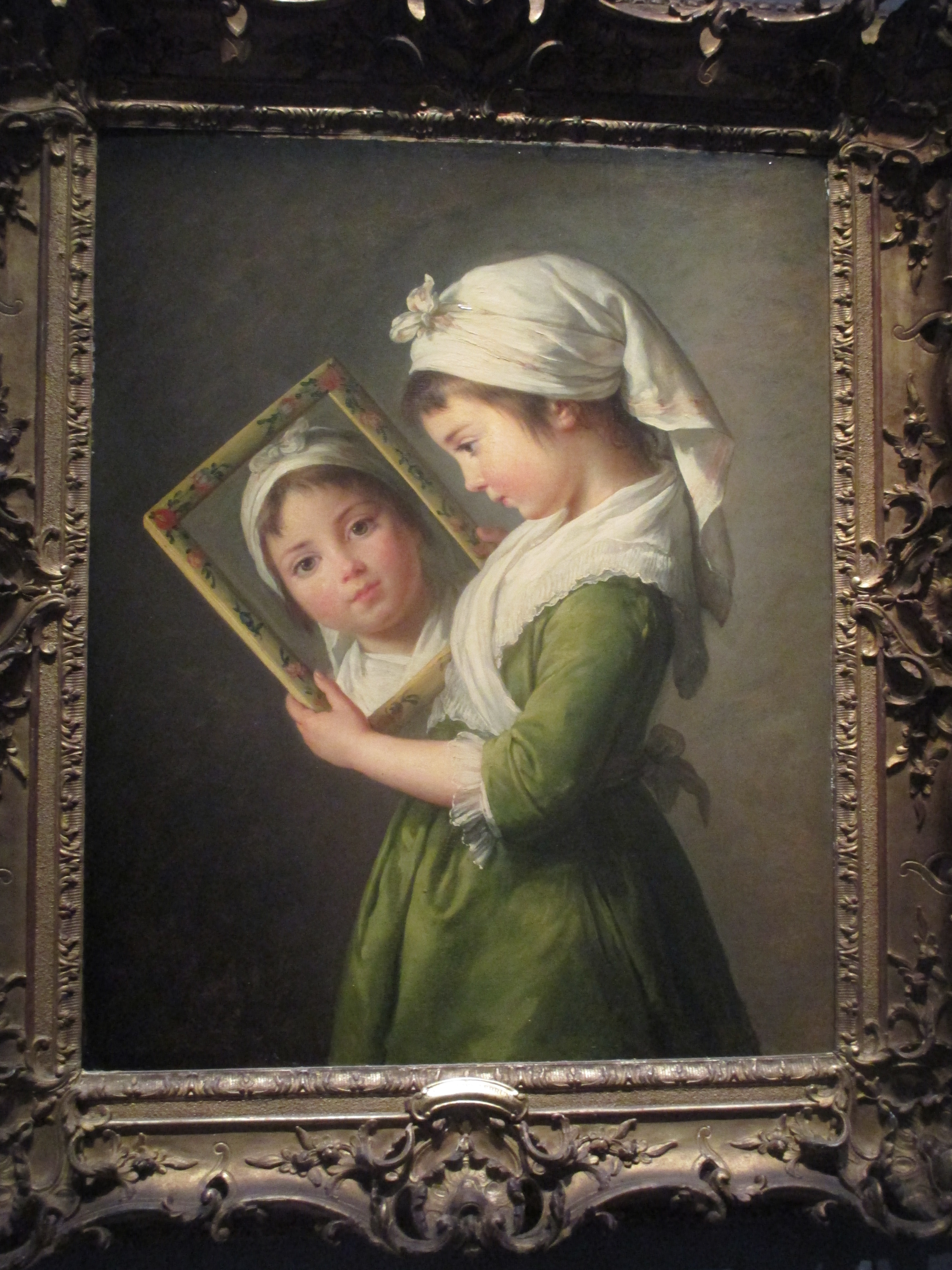
Portrait of Julie by her mother in 1787

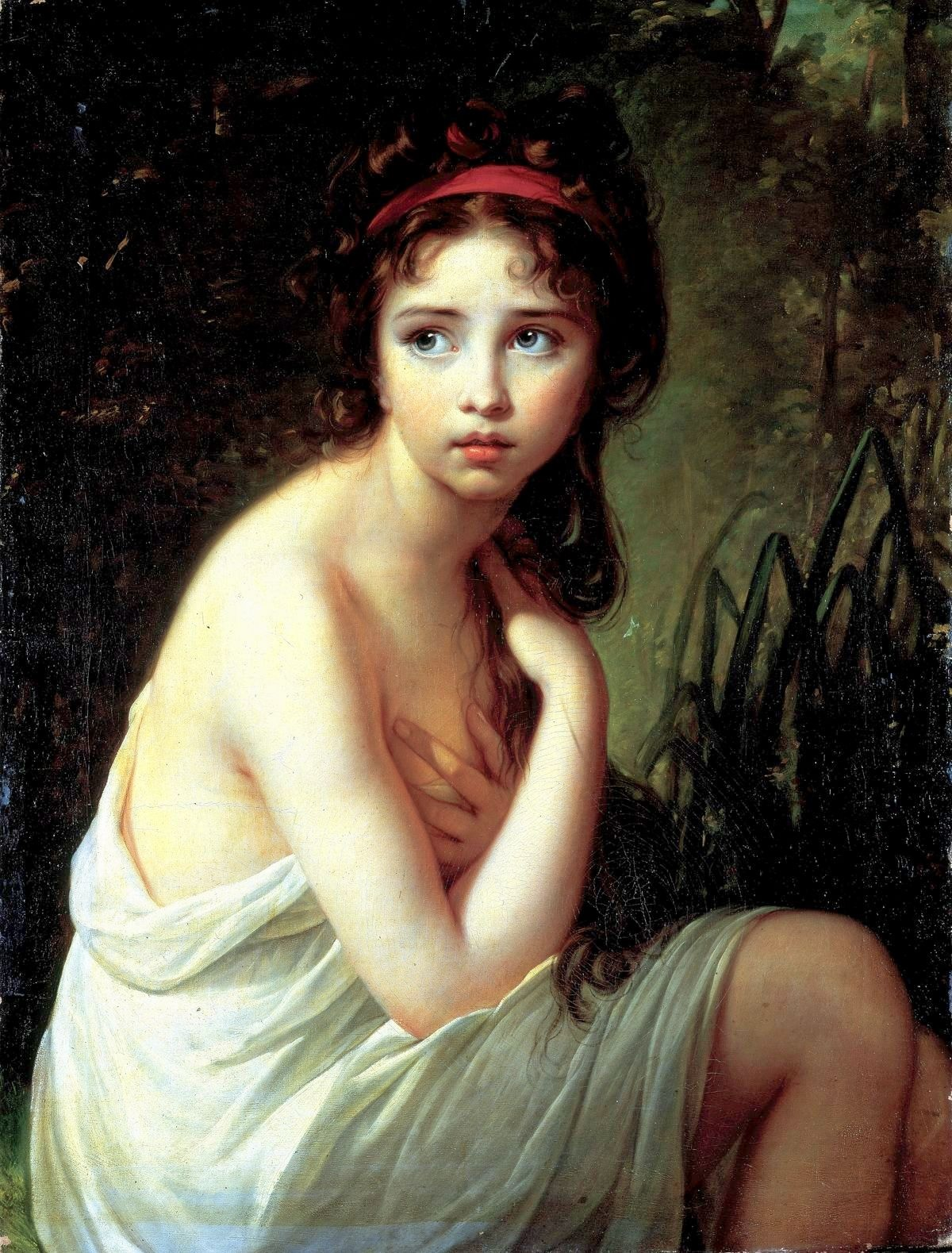
Julie as the bather, 1792

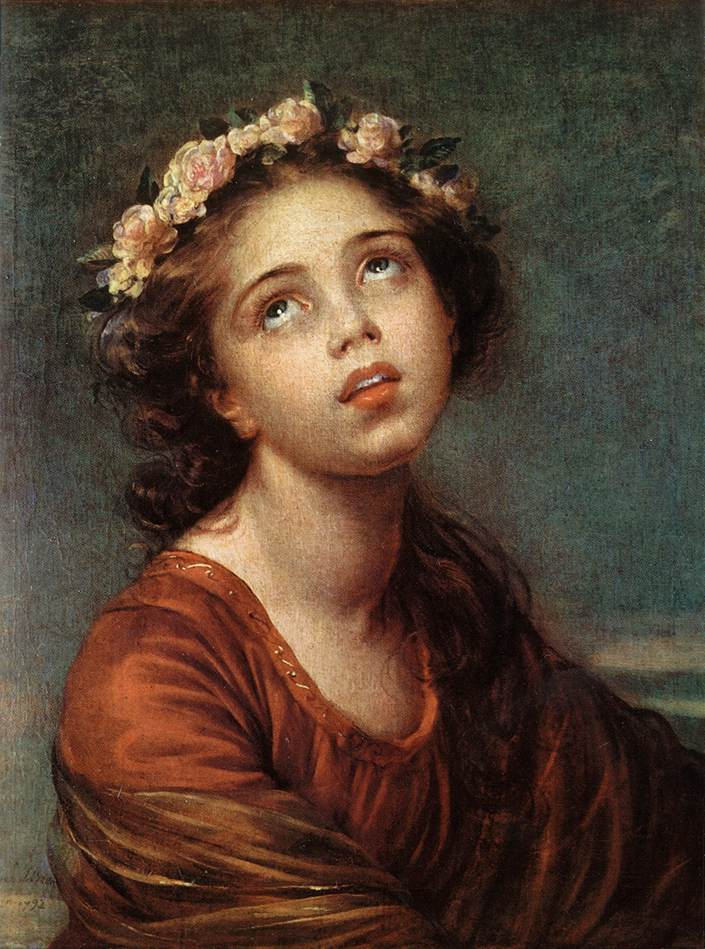
Portrait of Julie, 1792

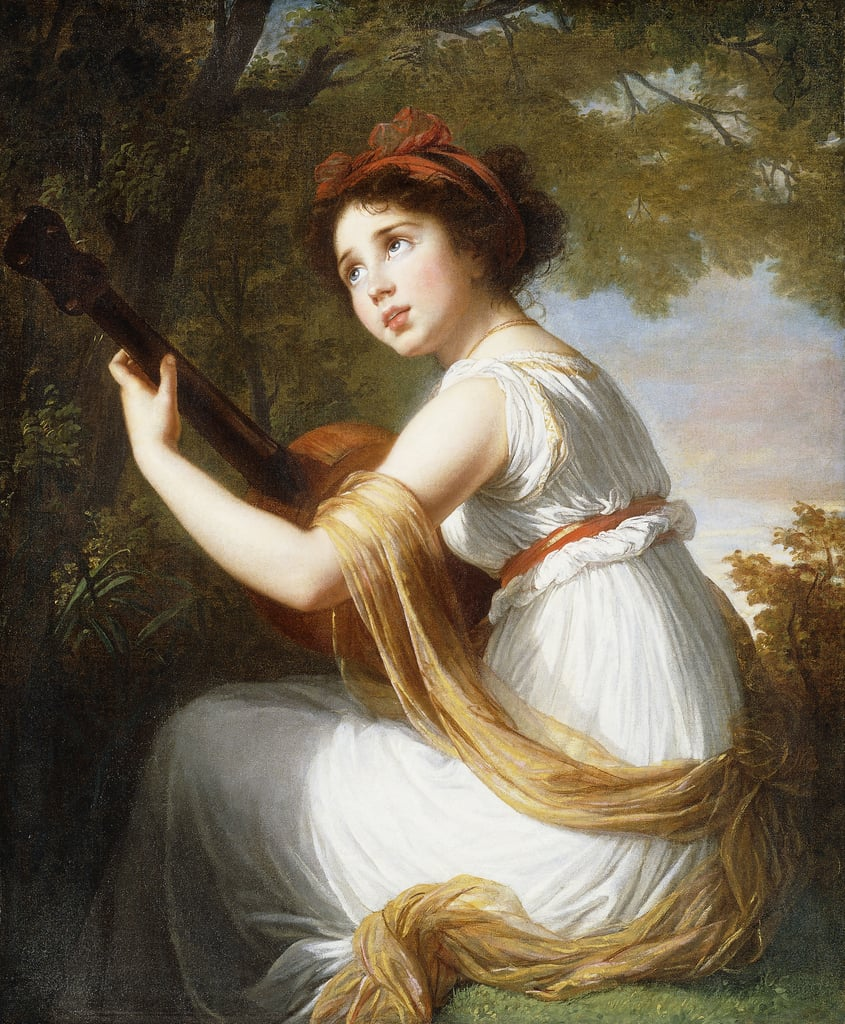
Julie plays guitar, 1797

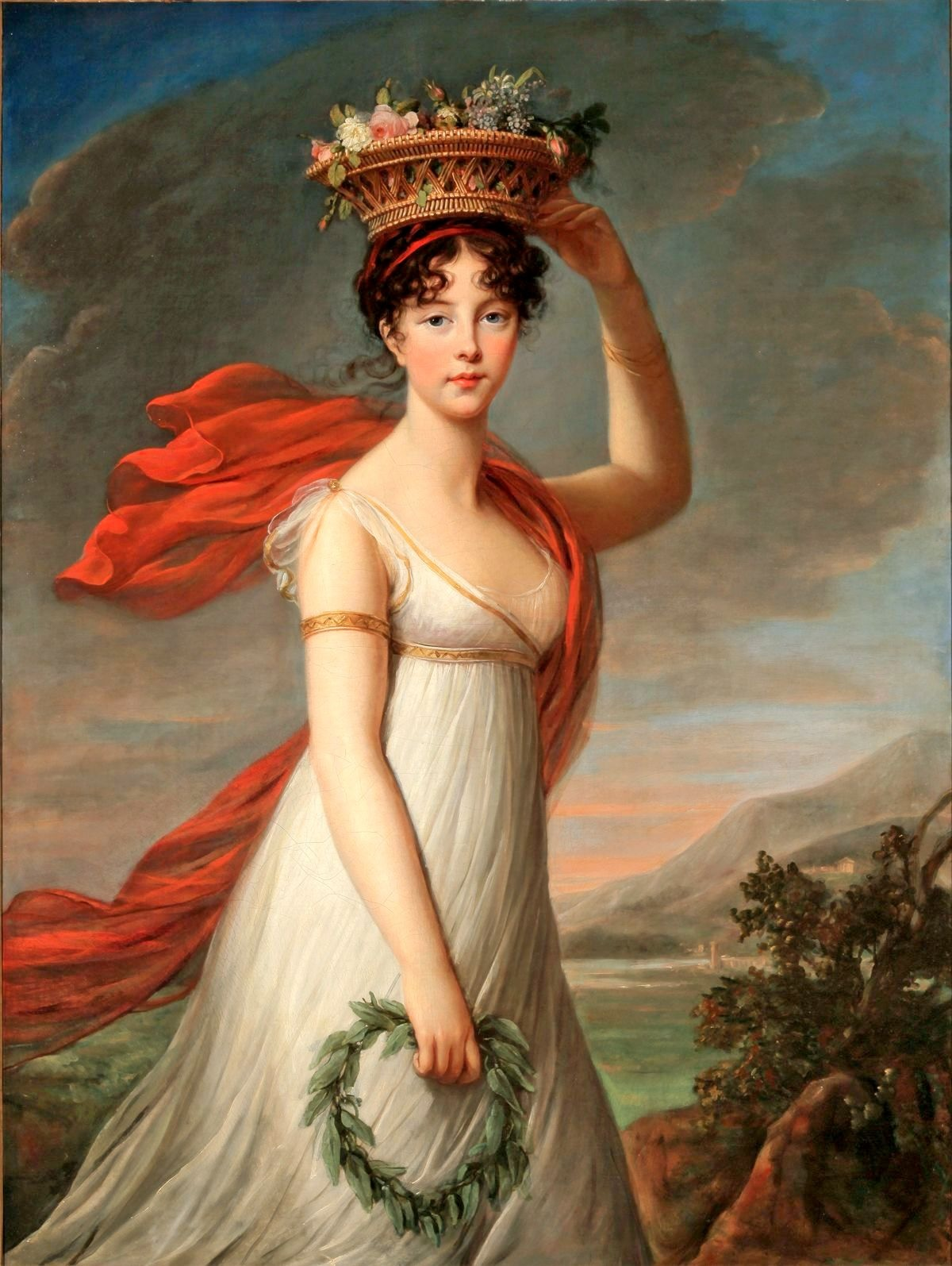
Julie as Flora, Roman Goddess Of Flowers, 1799
