= Galerie Lebrun =

Former art gallery in Paris, France

- Established: 1787; 239 years ago
- Location: 4 Rue Gros-Chenet (now Rue de Sentier); Paris, France
- Coordinates: 48.8691°N 2.3480°E
- Type: Art museum
- Architect: Jean-Armand Raymond
- Owner: Jean-Baptiste-Pierre Lebrun

Galerie Lebrun (English: Lebrun Gallery) was an art gallery of Jean-Baptiste-Pierre Le Brun, formerly based in Paris, France.

== History ==
Galerie Lebrun was located in Paris in the Kingdom of France in the late 18th century. It was named after Jean-Baptiste-Pierre Le Brun, a French painter and art dealer who was married to French portraitist Élisabeth Vigée Le Brun. Le Brun had leased the 17th century Hôtel de Lubert on rue de Cléry in 1776, using it as a nine-room gallery apartment. J.B.P Le Brun had renovated the Hôtel de Lubert to host exhibitions and art sales.

In July 1778, Le Brun acquired the full hotel building and, by the mid-1780s, developed the Galerie Lebrun as an exhibition hall. The location, adjoining the Hôtel de Lubert, housed an art gallery and a salesroom with a façade on 4 Rue Gros-Chenet (now Rue du Sentier) in the 2nd arrondissement of Paris. The architect behind the design was Jean-Armand Raymond, later associated with the Louvre.

Le Brun used the space to display gallery holdings, conduct estate sales, and present a range of exhibitions. The Galerie LeBrun was noted in the Journal de Paris as a space where students and amateurs could learn while the King's museum was under construction.

=== 18th century ===
An estate sale of the Comte de Vaudreuil's paintings, furniture, and porcelains took place at Le Brun's gallery in Paris on 26 November 1787.

Exhibitions showcasing the works of young artists were frequently held at the gallery. The Galerie Lebrun hosted the Exposition de la Jeunesse in 1789 and 1790.

=== 19th century ===
Hippolyte Sebron made his debut as a genre painter at the Galerie Lebrun in 1824.

==== Exposition au profit des Grecs ====
On 17 May 1826, the gallery held a major exhibition to raise funds for the War of Greek Independence called the Expositions au profit des Grecs. Jacques-Louis David's complete body of work, featuring his drawings and notably The Death of Socrates, was displayed at the gallery. The painting The Combat of the Giaour and Hassan by Eugène Delacroix was sent to the gallery as well as Greece on the Ruins of Missolonghi. French history painter Jacques-Antoine Vallin entered his work at the exhibition. French painter and lithographer Pierre-Roch Vigneron also exhibited in 1826, at the gallery, L'enfant abandonné (The abandoned child). The exhibition closed on 19 September 1826. Published that year, Les expositions de la galerie Lebrun, showcased the first catalog of prints from the gallery's modern art exhibition.

In the winter of 1827–28, the Galerie Lebrun was directed by Binant and hosted an exhibition featuring works that were not accepted into the Salon at the Louvre.

==== Exposition au profit de la caisse ouverte pour l'extinction de la mendicité ====
A few years later, a new painting exhibition was organized at the gallery to support philanthropic causes. On 15 May 1829, the Parisian gallery hosted an exhibition for the benefit of the fund opened for the extinction of begging titled Exposition au profit de la caisse ouverte pour l'extinction de la mendicité. Among the artists showcased, the Galerie Lebrun displayed two works by Jean-Baptiste-Camille Corot: Le Château Saint-Ange and Le Matin sur la place Saint-Marc à Venise. During the exhibition, 1,000 copies of the Explanation of the Works of Painting and Sculpture Exhibited at the Lebrun gallery were registered on 12 June 1829, and 1,000 supplements to the catalog.

In 1841, 69 pictures from Alphonse Perregaux's collection were sold at an estate sale for 441,528 francs, with several acquired for England.

== See also ==
- Jean-Baptiste-Pierre Lebrun
- Élisabeth Vigée Le Brun
