= The Immaculate Conception (Murillo, 1670) =

Painting by Bartolomé Esteban Murillo

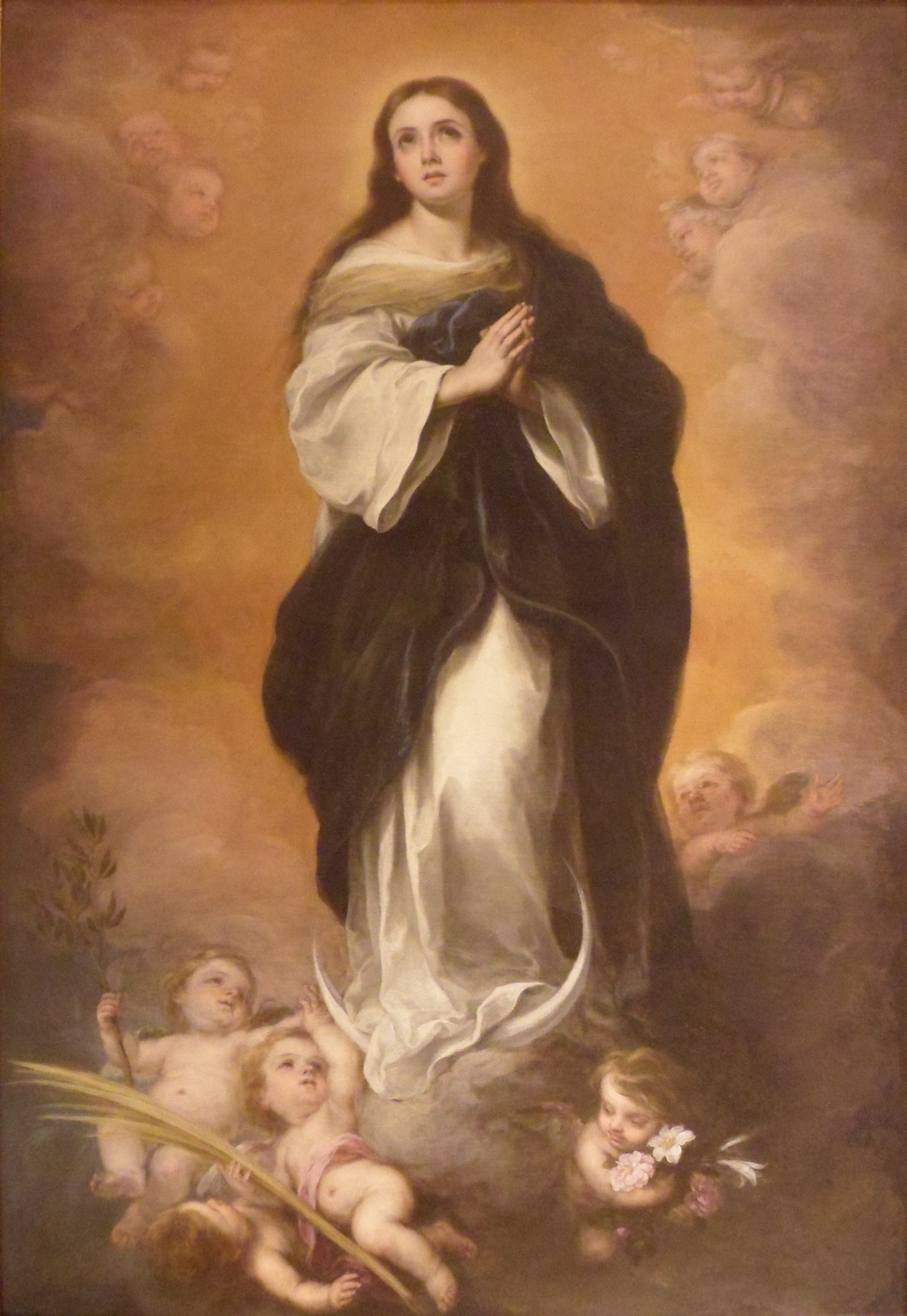
Inmaculada Concepción (1670) by Bartlomé Esteban Murilo

The Immaculate Conception is an oil on canvas painting made by Bartolomé Esteban Murillo in the year 1670. It belongs to the collection of Museo Soumaya. The dimensions are 168 x 112 cm.

The painting was identified as an autograph Murillo in the 1979 catalogue by Diego Angulo Íñiguez, Spanish art historian. It belonged to the French marshal Horace François Bastien Sébastiani de La Porta, an officer who participated in Napoleon's invasion of Spain in 1807. The painting traveled with him back to Paris and remained there until Jean-Baptiste-Pierre Lebrun purchased it on the recommendation of his artist ex-wife Louise Élisabeth Vigée Le Brun, who also suggested he return it to Spain.
