= The Death of Socrates =

1787 painting by Jacques-Louis David

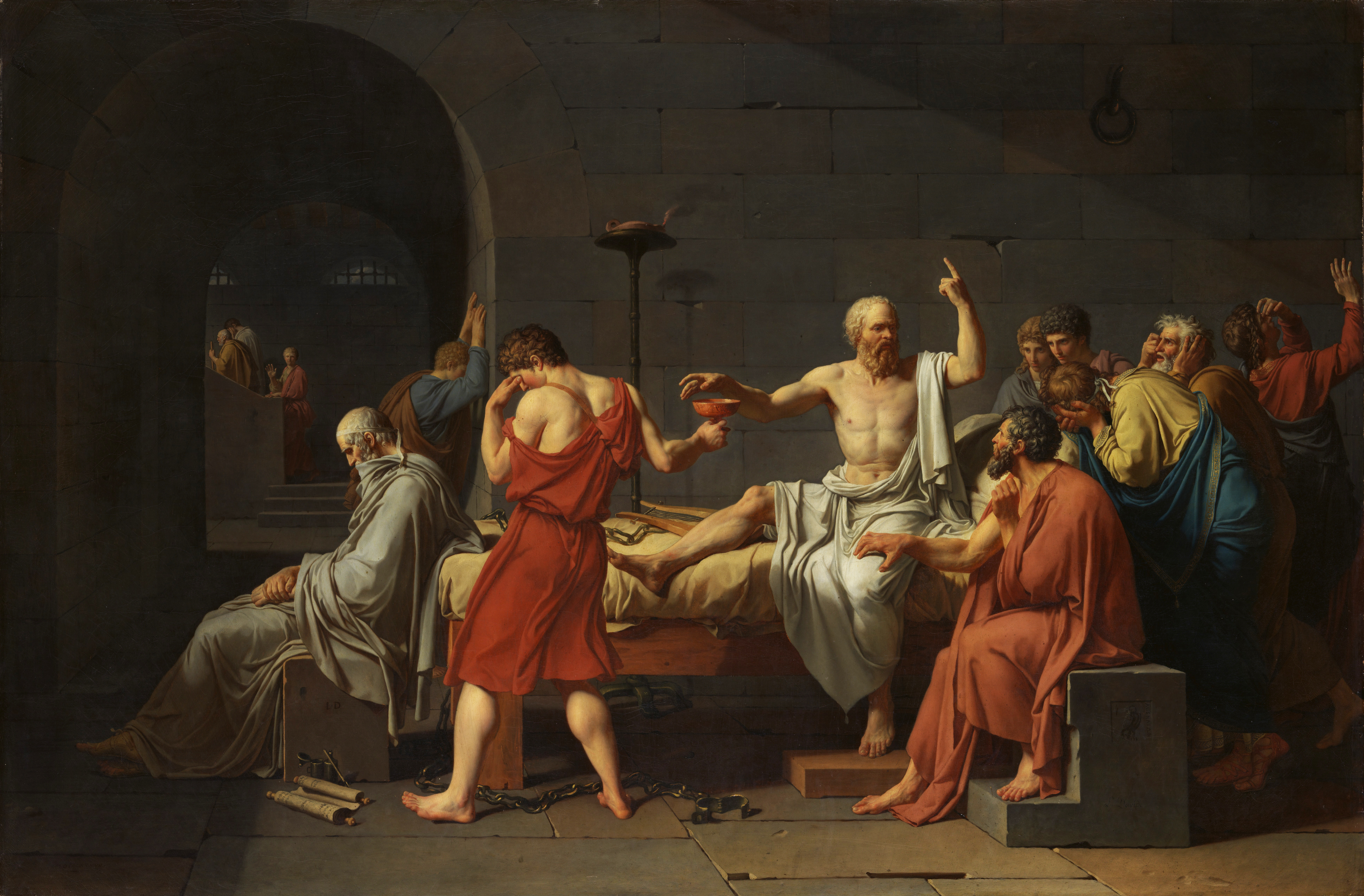
- Artist: Jacques-Louis David
- Year: 1787
- Medium: Oil on canvas
- Movement: Neoclassicism
- Dimensions: 129.5 cm × 196.2 cm (51.0 in × 77.2 in)
- Location: Metropolitan Museum of Art, New York

The Death of Socrates (French: La Mort de Socrate) is an oil on canvas painted by French painter Jacques-Louis David in 1787. The painting was part of the neoclassical style, popular in the 1780s, that depicted subjects from the Classical age, in this case the story of the execution of Socrates as told by Plato in his Phaedo. In this story, Socrates has been convicted of corrupting the youth of Athens and introducing strange gods, and has been sentenced to die by drinking poison hemlock. Socrates uses his death as a final lesson for his pupils rather than fleeing when the opportunity arises, and faces it calmly. The Phaedo depicts the death of Socrates and is also Plato's fourth and last dialogue to detail the philosopher's final days, which is also detailed in Euthyphro, Apology, and Crito.

== Description ==
In the painting, an elderly Socrates is dressed in a white robe and sits upright on a bed, one hand extended over a cup, the other gesturing in the air; he is still teaching. He is surrounded by his friends of varying ages, most showing emotional distress, unlike Socrates, who remains calm. The young man handing him the cup looks the other way, with his face in his free hand. Crito listens intently to his teacher's words while clutching his knee. An elderly man, Plato, sits at the end of the bed, slumped over and looking in his lap. To the left, other men are seen through an arch set in the background wall. On the stairway in the background, Socrates' wife Xanthippe, who had been dismissed earlier by her husband, takes a wistful glance backward at the scene.

David uses color to highlight the emotion in this painting. The shades of red are more muted on the edges of the painting and become more vibrant in the center, culminating in the dark red robe of the man holding the cup of poison, generally taken as offering the cup to Socrates rather than receiving it after Socrates had consumed its contents. The only two serene men, Socrates and Plato, are garbed in a contrasting bluish-white. The more muted color scheme of this painting may be a response to critics of David's Oath of the Horatii, who called his colors "garish".

David simplifies the scene by removing many characters originally described in the dialogues of Plato. He also displayed some artistic license in representing the ages of many of the pupils of Socrates, including Plato. Socrates, while elderly, is depicted as rather more handsome and fit than a 70-year old of his era would be in a more realistic depiction; his face is also much more idealized than the classical bust that is typically used as a reference portrait of Socrates. Plato would have been a young man at the time of Socrates's death, but in this painting he is the old man sitting at the foot of the bed. David might have intended the painting to be set in Plato's imagination, where an elderly Plato attempts to conjure the scene in his imagination as he writes.

David signed this painting in two places; he put his full signature under Crito, the young man clutching Socrates's thigh, and his initials under Plato. David's signature placement often had symbolic meaning – for example, in his painting of Stanisław Kostka Potocki, David signed in the collar of the dog that is barking at the sitter. In Death of Socrates, his signatures also have meaning. His initials under Plato are a reference to the fact that the story comes from Plato, a thanks for the inspiration. His fuller signature under Crito means that this is the character whom the artist identifies most with. This may be a reference for Crito's position in the composition – clutching Socrates's thigh. In this way, David would be seen as a man who likewise clutches at the morals and values that Socrates represents.

== Creation and history ==
Rather than a royal commission, David received a direct private commission for the work in 1786 from the wealthy Charles-Michel Trudaine de la Sablière, the youngest son of Trudaine de Montigny's and around 20 years old at the time. (Note: There is some uncertainty on the nature of the commission; other sources report it is unclear which of the brothers Trudaine made the commission, Charles-Louis or Charles-Michel.) Trudaine was intrigued by a drama that Denis Diderot had considered writing but never completed. One of the dramatic scenes that Diderot's unfinished work did include was his death, which led to the commission for a painting. David's friend at the time André Chénier was also a member of the "Trudaine society" circle, and David appears to have followed Chénier's suggestions on matters such as the pose of Socrates in reaching out for the cup while still teaching. More generally, Socrates was a popular subject at the time as an example of Enlightenment values: a man who kept to the truth with admirable rationality and self-control.

David had created an initial treatment as early as 1782, and he returned to this early composition now that he had a commission. He consulted Father Jean Adry, a Hellenist and scholar on the subject, on the circumstances of Socrates death. One of Adry's letters has survived; he recommended that Plato should be shown as immobile (although Plato was not actually present), that Crito be shown with more emotion, and that Apollodorus (on the extreme right in the painting) should be visibly filled with emotion.

It was during David's first trip to Rome that he began to study the depiction of funerary scenes and to draw many examples. Many of David's major works stem from these funerary drawings. In The Death of Socrates, David examines a philosopher's approach to death. Socrates is stoic and calm because he sees death as a separate, actual realm, a different state of being from life but not an end to being. In the painting, Socrates's gesture shows us that he is still teaching, even in the moment before his death.

== Similar paintings ==
Pierre Peyron, a contemporary of David's, also painted an artistic rendition of the Death of Socrates around 1787. Both Peyron's version and David's version were displayed at the same Salon of 1787. The two had something of a rivalry before, with both hoping to become Director of the French Academy in Rome when the position next opened; the critics felt the two paintings decisively settled the matter in favor of David. Count Potocki derisively stated that Peyron's work "has shown up the quality of David's picture by proving to the public how far beneath him one could be".

Another painting depicting the death of Socrates was done by the Italian artist Giambettino Cignaroli in the first half of the 18th century. Cignaroli's work shows Socrates already dead, surrounded by his anguished followers.

Yet another depiction of Socrates' death was done by the French artist Jacques-Philippe-Joseph de Saint-Quentin. The work, currently housed at the École Nationale Supérieure des Beaux-Arts in Paris, France, dates to circa 1762.

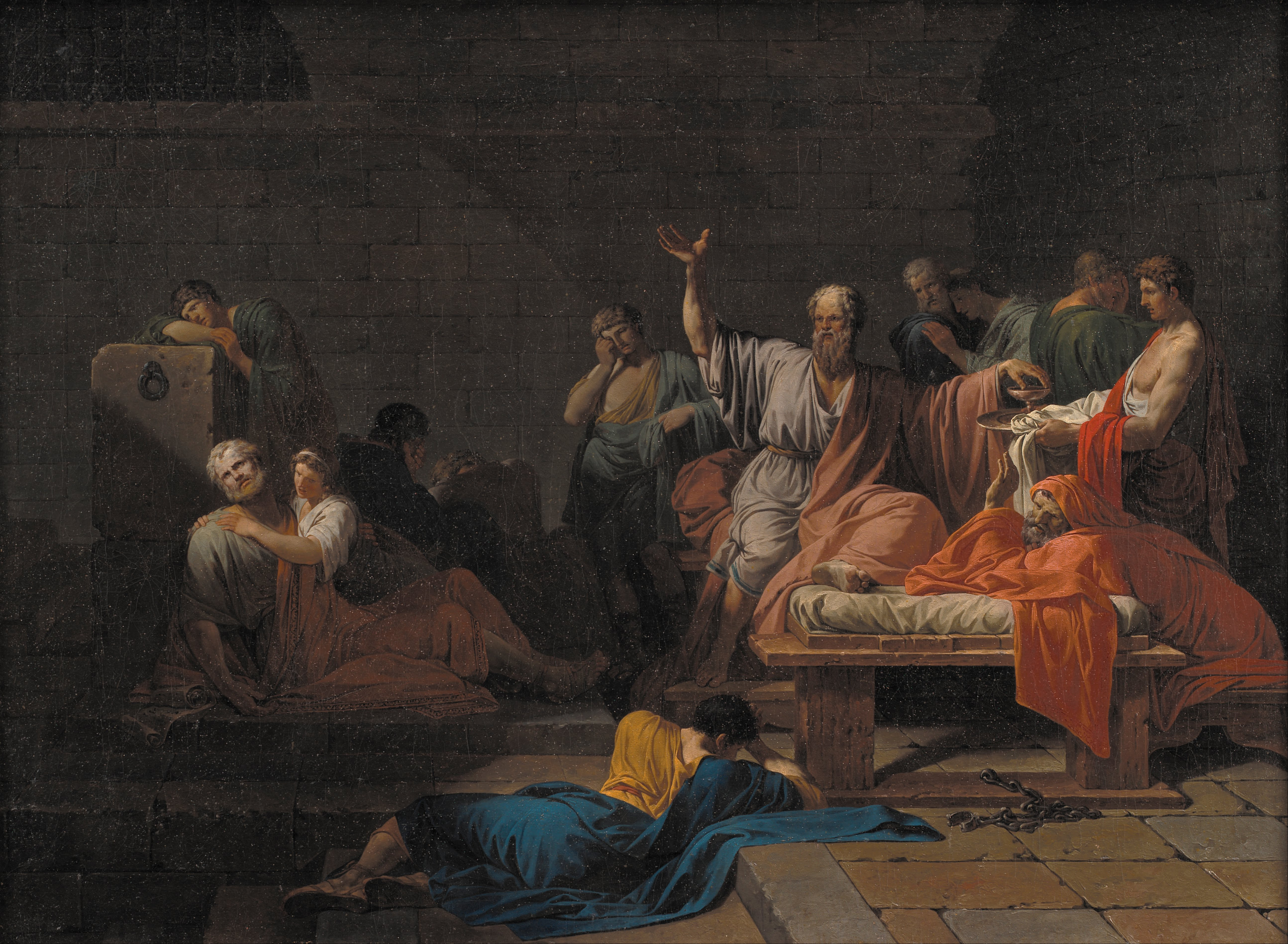
The Death of Socrates by Pierre Peyron

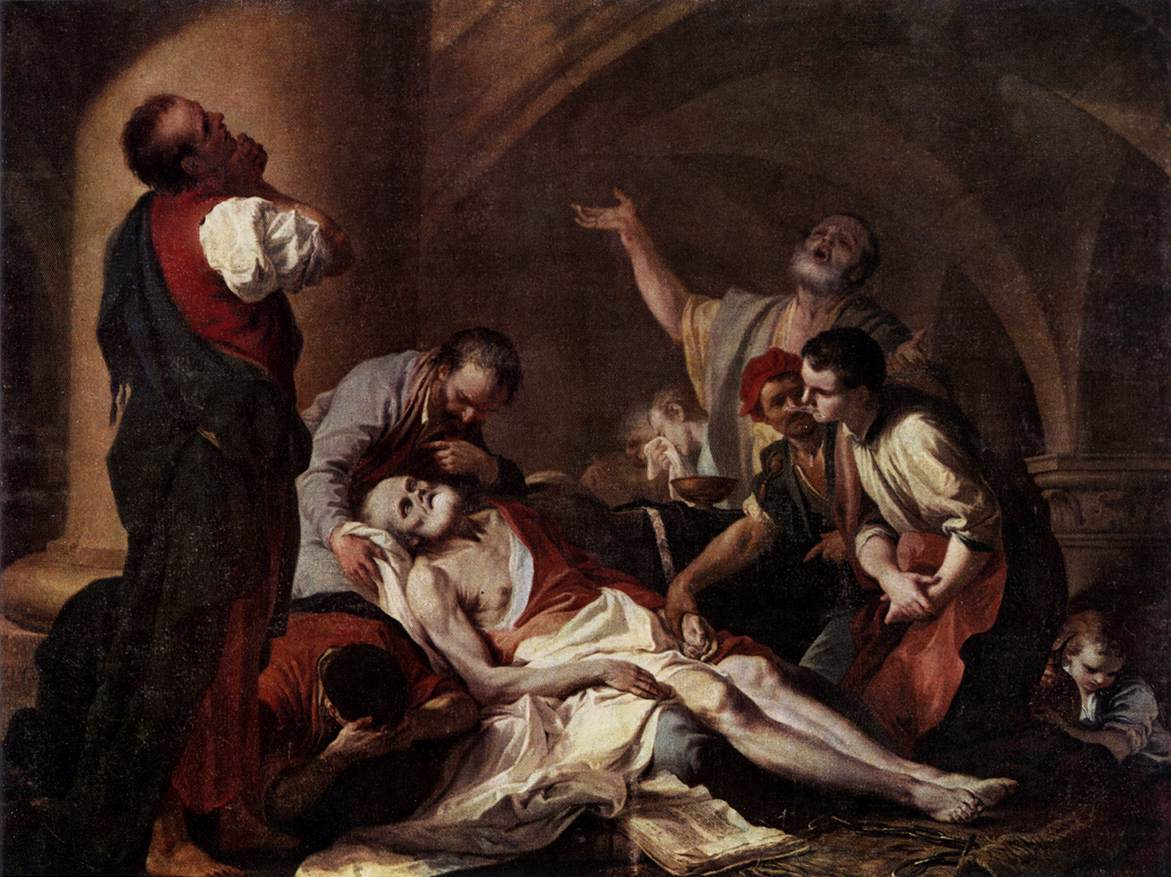
The Death of Socrates by Giambettino Cignaroli

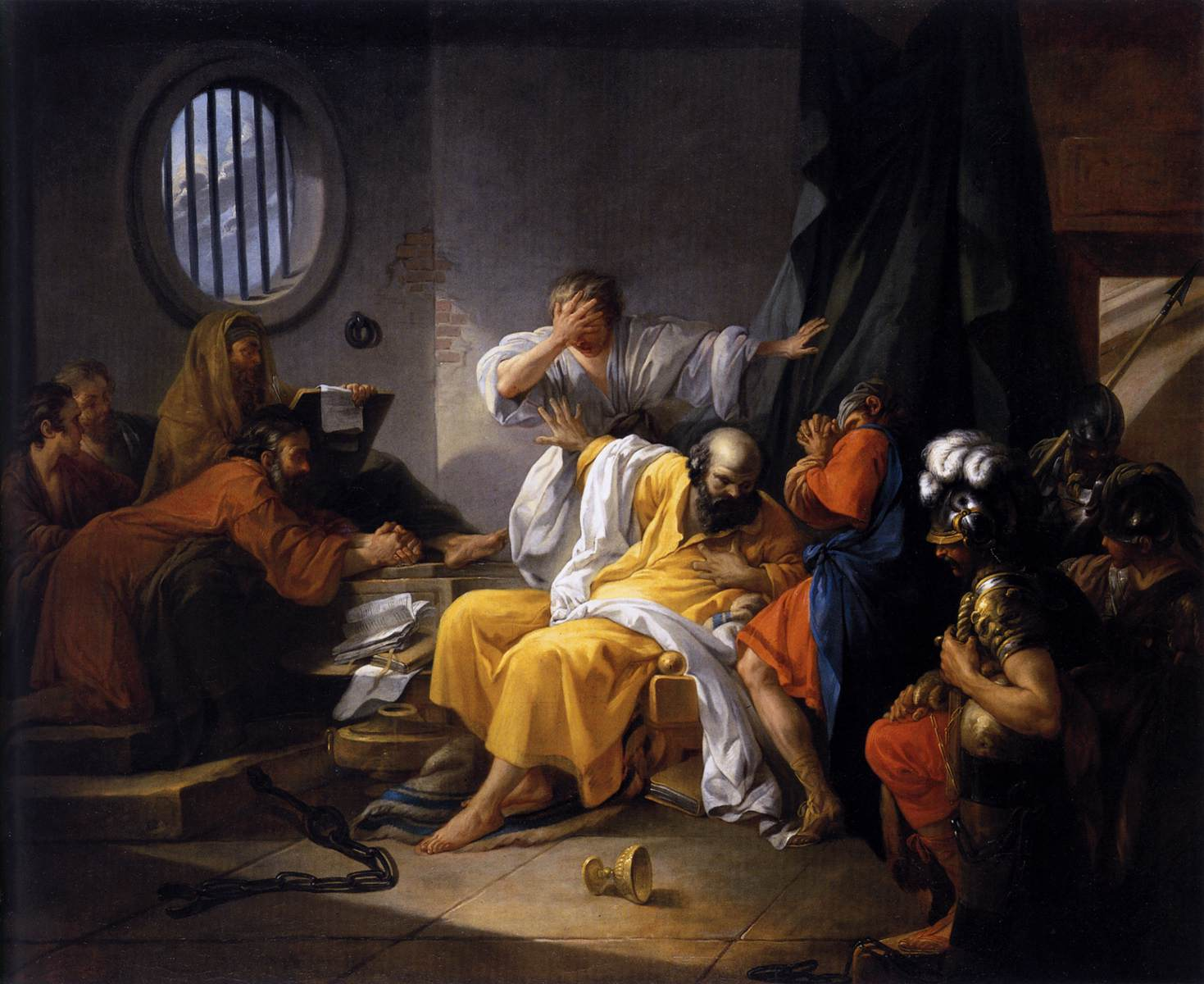
The Death of Socrates by Jacques-Philip-Joseph de Saint-Quentin

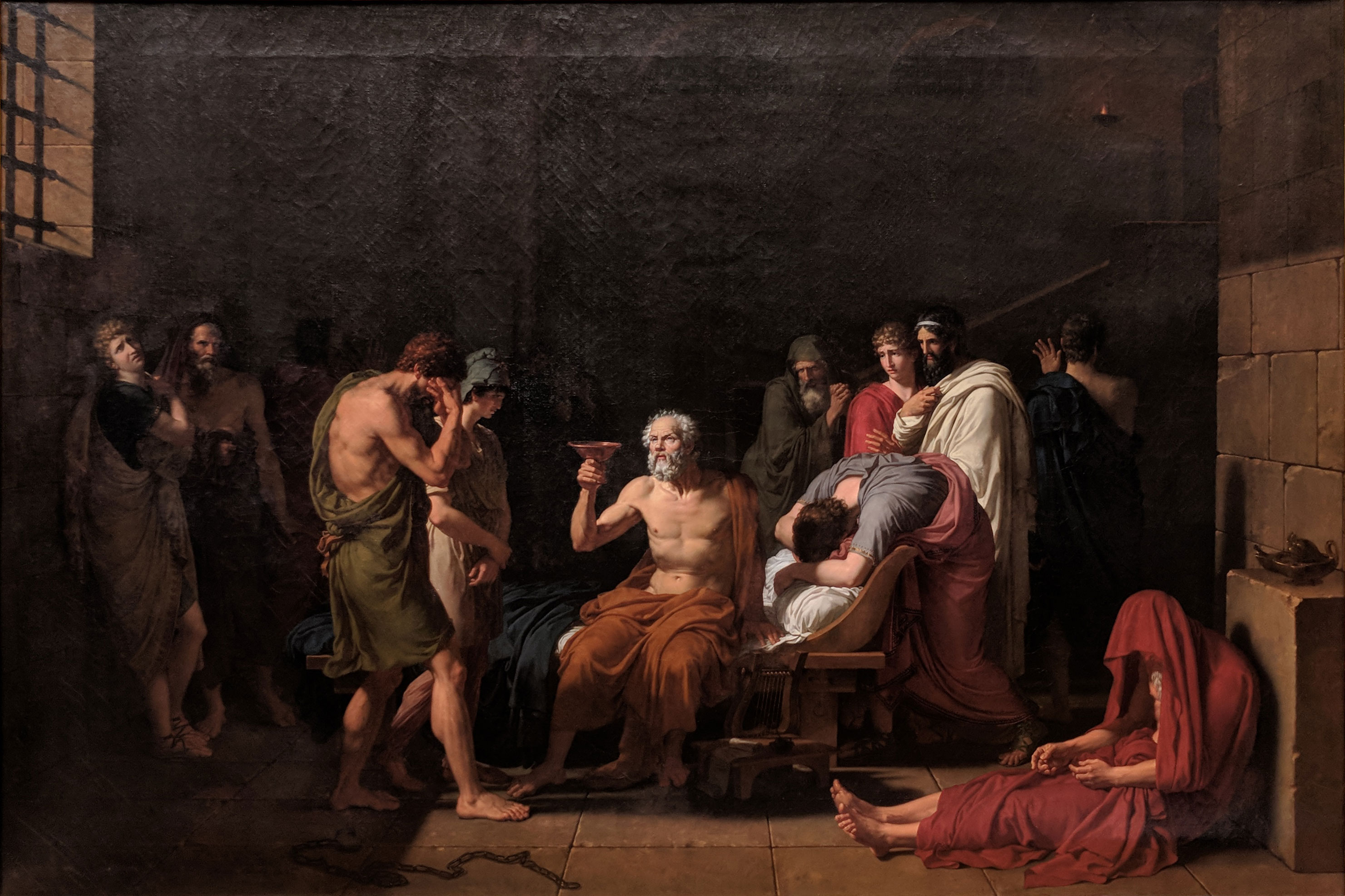
The Death of Socrates by Francois-Xavier Fabre

== Release and reception ==
David debuted the painting at the Paris Salon of 1787, the official art exhibition. The painting received prompt acclaim among David's contemporaries. The English painter Joshua Reynolds wrote that The Death of Socrates was "the greatest work of art since the Sistine Chapel and Raphael's Stanze in the Vatican." The American minister to France, Thomas Jefferson, wrote that the painting was the best work at the Salon of 1787, and that the painting was "superb". The painting was sufficiently successful that David showed it again at the Salon of 1791; it still attracted interest due to the changed political environment, as heroic stories from an earlier age fit the mood of the early French Revolution.

An 1826 exhibition intended to raise money for the Greek War of Independence displayed much of David's work at the Galerie Lebrun, including The Death of Socrates. The exhibition attracted much interest due to a backlash from the post-Bourbon Restoration royalist government, which disliked David and had refused permission for his body to be buried in France, albeit more for his Revolutionary-era paintings than Socrates.

== Provenance ==
After Charles-Michel Trudaine de la Sablière and his brother were executed in 1794 during the Reign of Terror, the painting passed to his brother's wife Louise Micault de Courbeton, Madame Trudaine de Montigny. The painting passed between several people in inheritances and private sales, notably including Olivier de Saint-Georges de Vérac and his wife from 1809–1870. In 1931, the painting was sold to the Metropolitan Museum of Art in New York, where it has stayed since.

== See also ==
- List of paintings by Jacques-Louis David
