= The Fish Market =

1659 painting by Adriaen van Ostade

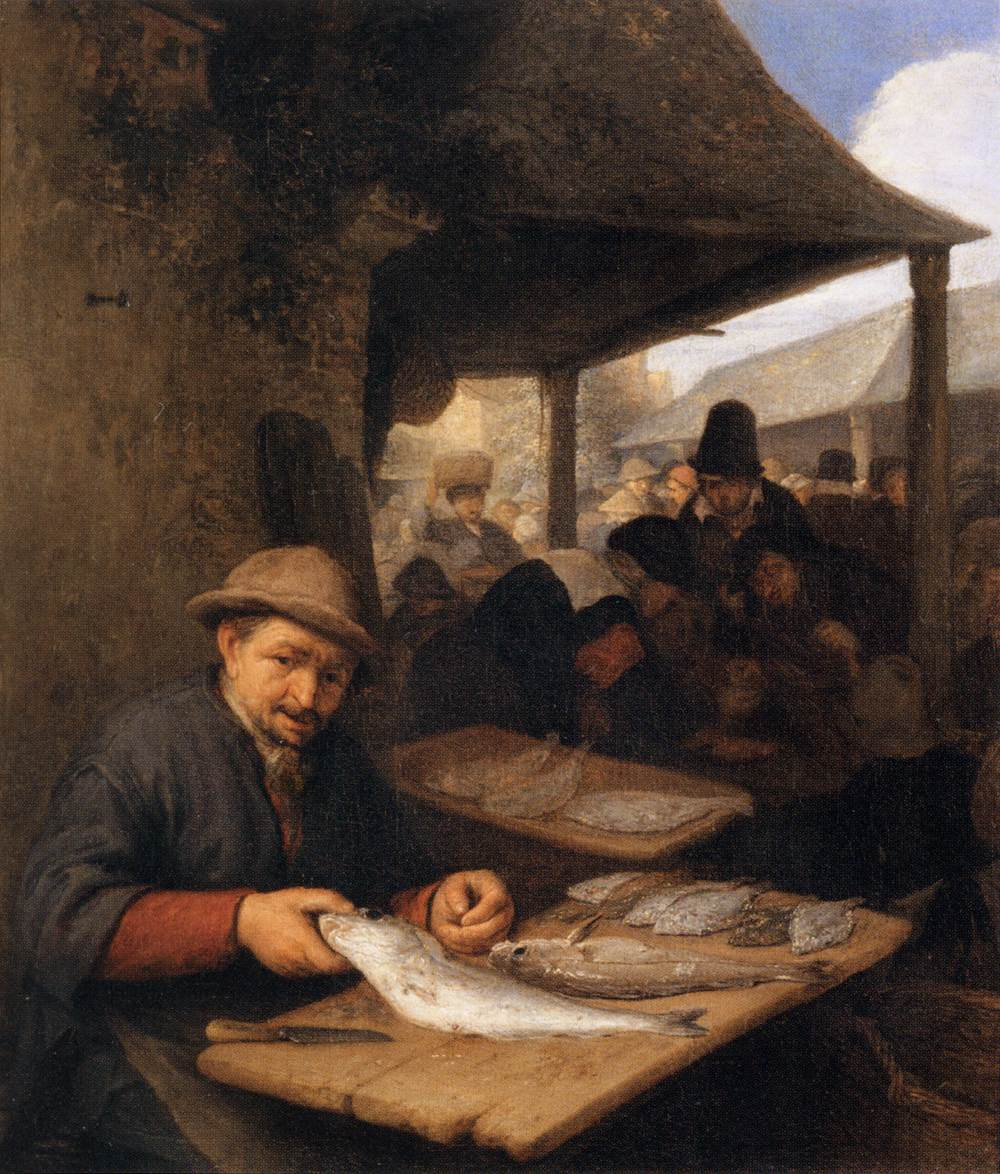
- Artist: Adriaen van Ostade
- Year: 1659
- Medium: oil on canvas
- Dimensions: 34 cm × 41.3 cm (13 in × 16.3 in)
- Location: Louvre, Paris

The Fish Market is an oil on canvas painting by Adriaen van Ostade, from 1659. It is held in the Louvre, in Paris.

== Description ==
It has been described as a post-Rembrandtesque work from van Ostade's mature period, showing a major theme in Flemish painting, urban markets. In his mature work, Ostade portrayed his countrymen in the naturalistic style he had learned from his first teacher, Frans Hals, combined with the chiaroscuro of Rembrandt, whom he admired. This painting is an excellent example of the successful fusion of these two styles.

In the foreground, the vendor proudly displays his largest catch, looking directly at the viewer. He appears to have cleaned it with a knife before offering it to a customer. Other stalls are lined up under a canopy, and in a neighboring shop, customers lean over the display tables to inspect their purchases. In the background, which gradually brightens as it recedes, a maid can be seen returning home, balancing a large shopping basket on her head.

== Provenance ==
It was bought by the Louvre in 1801 during a public sale of paintings brought to Paris from Flanders and the Netherlands by Alexandre Joseph Paillet and Cloclers. It is still held there as INV 1681.
