= Self-Portrait (Rembrandt, Louvre) =

1639 painting by Rembrandt van Rijn

Self-portrait with architectural elements in the background
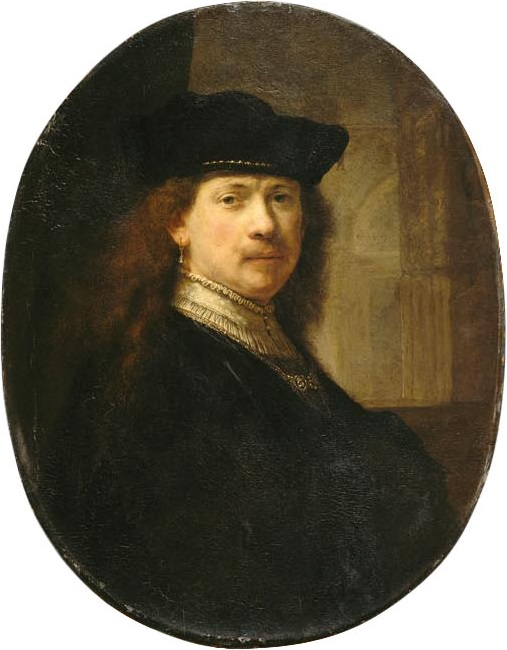
- Artist: Rembrandt
- Year: c. 1639
- Medium: oil paint, oak panel
- Dimensions: 80 cm (31 in) × 62 cm (24 in)

Self-Portrait or Self-Portrait with an Architectural Background is a c. 1639 oil on panel self-portrait by Rembrandt, now in the Louvre in Paris. It was bought by the art dealer Alexandre Joseph Paillet in London in 1785 for the collection of Louis XVI.

== Sources ==
- http://cartelfr.louvre.fr/cartelfr/visite?srv=car_not_frame&idNotice=25574
