= La Gimblette =

Painting by Jean-Honoré Fragonard c. 1770

La Gimblette (Munich version)
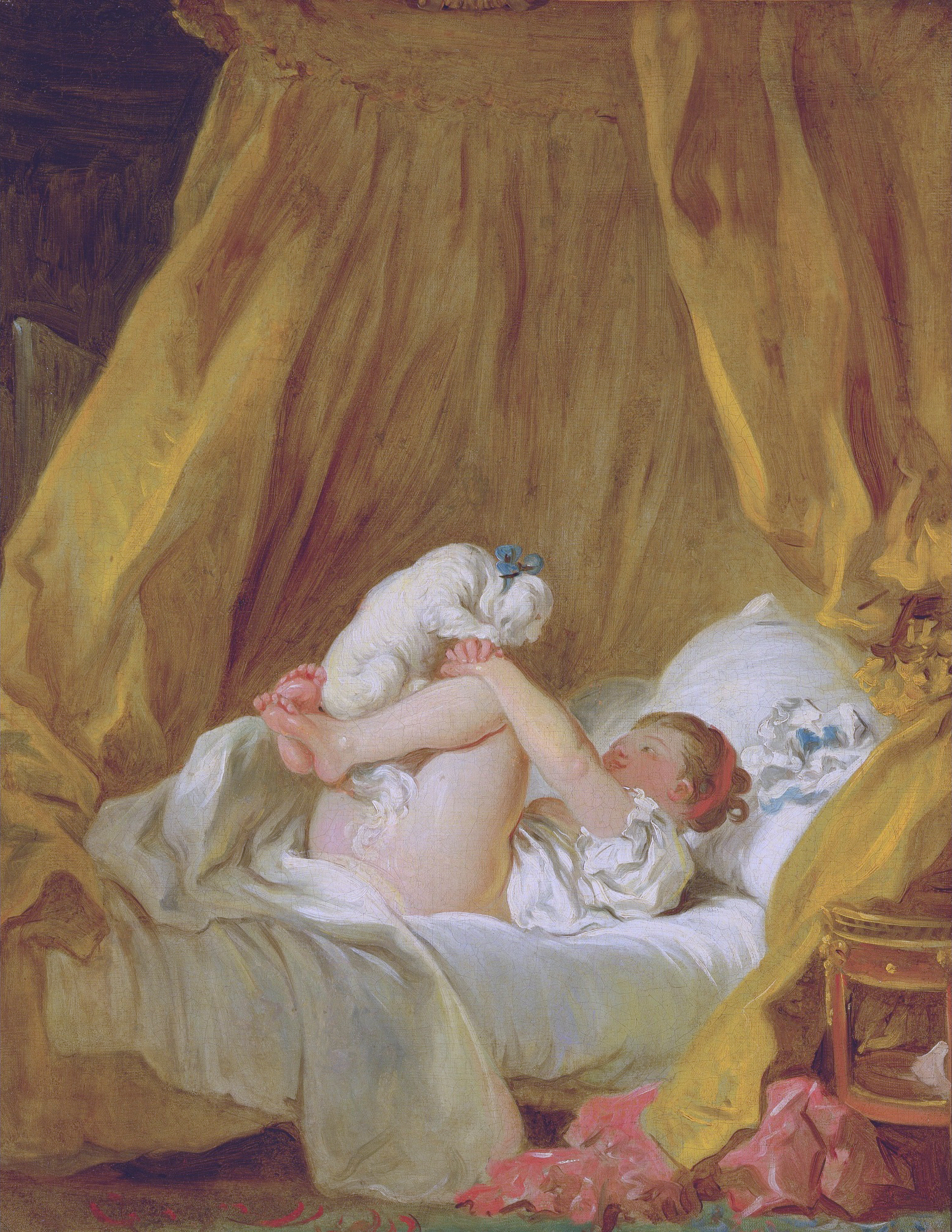
- Artist: Jean-Honoré Fragonard
- Year: c. 1770
- Medium: Oil on canvas
- Movement: Rococo
- Dimensions: 89 cm × 70 cm (35 in × 28 in)
- Location: Alte Pinakothek, Munich

La Gimblette is one of the most famous paintings by the French painter Jean-Honoré Fragonard and one of the most famous Rococo paintings. Like other paintings by Fragonard, such as The Swing, La Gimblette also has a frivolous component.

"The lovers' paradise of the mid-eighteenth century is no longer ours at the end of the twentieth. It is therefore not surprising that these pictures should, in some respects, remain strange to us."

— Jean-Pierre Cuzin (* 1944), General Curator of the Paintings Department of the Louvre Museum from 1973 to 2003

== A Testament to the Ancien Régime in several versions ==
According to auction sales catalogues and other sources, several versions of this painting existed. Three versions of La Gimblette can be traced back to the 18th century through contemporary auction catalogues. As two of these versions are now considered lost, it is not possible to determine with certainty which was the first, i.e., the original version.

The painting stands as a testament to the Ancien Régime, with a composition rich in symbolism that varies between versions and requires contextual interpretation.

== Description ==
The painting depicts a girl lying beneath a canopy in a voluminous bed, richly furnished with bed linen, playing with a dog. The subject of the painting is also known by the titles: Young girl in her bed, making her dog dance and Girl playing with a dog or Girl with dog.

The two protagonists – the girl and the dog – differ slightly in appearance and behaviour across the various versions of the painting; however, these differences significantly influence the interpretation of the scene. This is evident in the way the girl wears her clothes, whether she feeds the dog a gimblette, how she holds the animal, as well as in the dog's position and breed. In some versions, the dog resembles a spaniel, while in others it appears more like a pug or a poodle. In the Besenval version, the dog even resembles a poodle wearing a judge's wig, or the long ceremonial wig of a King's Counsel, which may be interpreted as a caricature. Edmond and Jules de Goncourt commented accordingly:

"At her feet is seen a curly poodle, bearing the visage of a bewigged counsel; laughing, she buries the soles of her feet in its hair."

— Edmond and Jules de Goncourt

The dog plays a distinct role in the composition; however, this role varies between versions and must therefore be interpreted accordingly. In the Munich version, it additionally serves to obscure parts of the girl's body.

== The best known four versions of La Gimblette ==
It is unknown how many versions of La Gimblette Jean-Honoré Fragonard painted. There are no records of it. Neither is any of the versions in question signed by Fragonard. Over time, however, four versions of La Gimblette became particularly famous. These four paintings have been differentiated as follows:

=== The Walferdin version ===
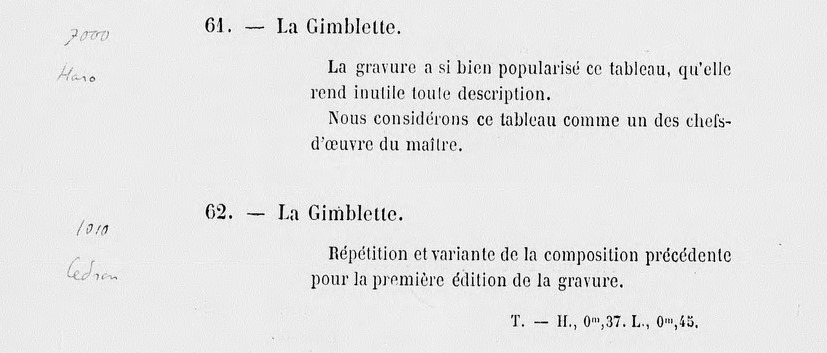
Excerpt from the auction catalogue of the sale of the Walferdin Collection at the Hôtel Drouot in 1880, p. 24, with annotations of the prices achieved for the lots 61 and 62 as well as the names of their buyers (Haro and Cedron).

It is named after the Walferdin Collection. It has been proven that there were two versions of La Gimblette in this collection. The dimensions of the first one, now called the Walferdin version, are: 35.0 cm x 40.5 cm. It has a provenance dating back to the 18th century.

This version was sold at auction at the Hôtel Drouot in Paris in 1880 in the sale of the Walferdin Collection, lot 62, for FRF 1,010. This version is considered lost. The second one is the one now known as the Munich version.

=== The Munich version ===
It is named after its current location, the Alte Pinakothek in Munich. The dimensions are: 89.0 cm x 70.0 cm. It has a provenance dating back to the 18th century.

This version was sold at auction at the Hôtel Drouot in Paris in 1880 in the sale of the Walferdin Collection, lot 61, for FRF 7,000. The buyer was none other than the expert in painting of the sale himself, Henri Haro (1855–1911). The painting was already traded on the art market before this auction, verifiably in the years 1795, 1839, 1847 and 1868. Over time, the painting changed owners several times. In 1977, the painting was owned by Jeannette Veil-Picard (1901–1996) before being bought by the HypoVereinsbank in the same year. It has since been made available to the Alte Pinakothek.

=== The Besenval version ===
It is named after its former owner Pierre Victor, Baron de Besenval de Brunstatt. The dimensions are: 70.0 cm x 86.5 cm. It has a provenance dating back to the 18th century. This version is considered lost.

=== The Mühlbacher version ===
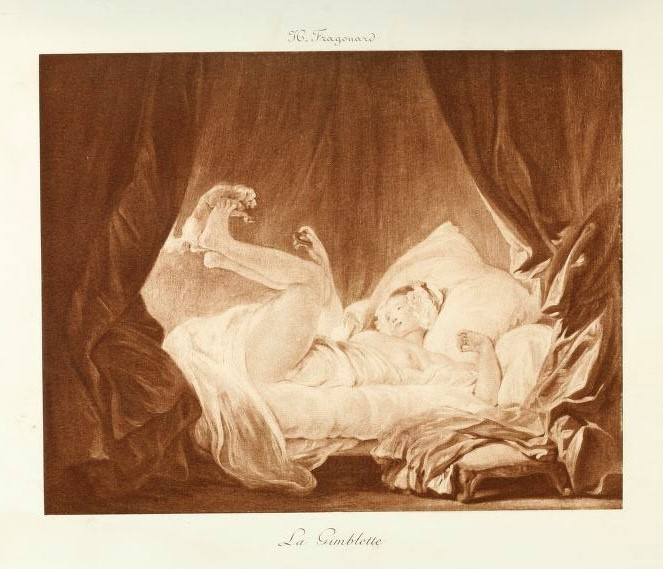
The Mühlbacher version of La Gimblette, as shown in the 1907 sales catalogue of the Galerie Georges Petit. This is probably the earliest photograph of one of the various versions of the painting La Gimblette ever taken. Compared to the picture in the Christie's auction catalogue of 2024, it can be assumed that the painting is still framed in the same frame as described in the 1907 sales catalogue.

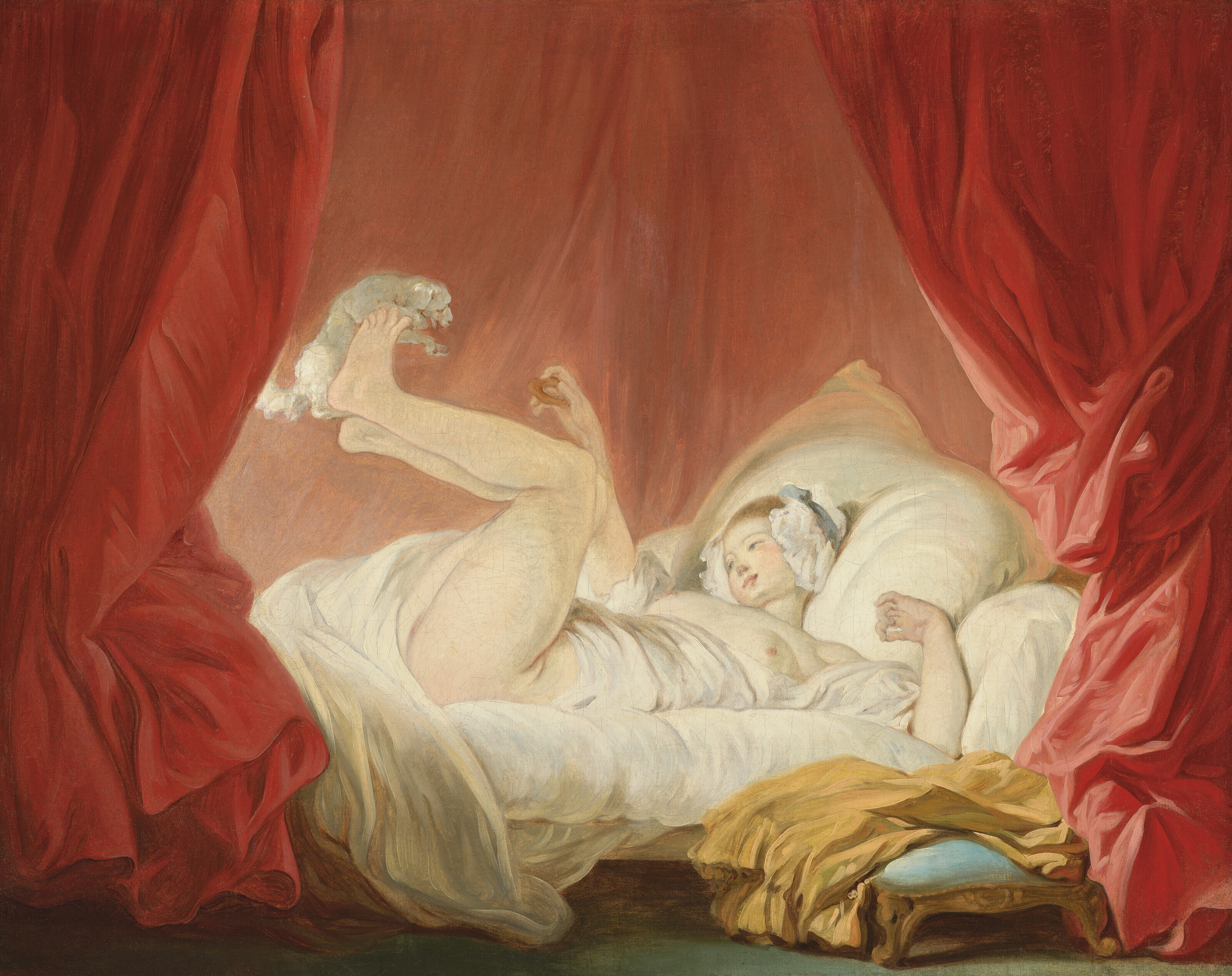
The Mühlbacher version of La Gimblette, as shown in the 2024 sales catalogue of Christie's in New York. The descriptions vary over the years, such as: by Fragonard, attributed to Fragonard or follower of Fragonard.

It is named after M. Georges Mühlbacher in whose collection the painting was at the beginning of the 20th century. The dimensions are: 72.4 cm x 91.0 cm. It has a provenance dating back to the early 20th century.

After the death of M. Georges Mühlbacher in 1906, the painting was sold at auction in Paris between 13 and 15 May 1907 by the Galerie Georges Petit, as part of the sale of the Mühlbacher Collection, lot 23, offered as painted by Jean-Honoré Fragonard, for FRF 31,500. The buyer was none other than one of the experts in painting of the sale himself, Marius Paulme (1863–1928). In the 1907 sales catalogue of the Galerie Georges Petit, the painting was described as follows:

A young woman lies upon a bed, half-naked, her blond hair covered by a muslin cap tied with a blue ribbon. Her head rests upon a large pillow; her legs are raised and half bent, and she holds a small white dog on the tips of her feet, offering it a gimblette. Pink curtains extend across the background to right and left. In the foreground, upon a blue stool, lies a skirt of yellow silk. Canvas, height, 72 cm; width, 90 cm. Old frame, in carved and gilded wood, from the Régence period.[13]

The Mühlbacher version was sold at auction on 31 January 2024 by Christie's in New York, Old Master Sale, lot 67, for US$ 756,000. However, the Mühlbacher version was auctioned several times after 1907, including in 1969, 1975 and 2001, whereat the auction houses did not always identify the painting as a work by Fragonard or attribute it to him. At the auction in 2001, it was offered as French school of the 18th century, follower of Fragonard.

The composition of this painting is known in three versions. In addition to the Mühlbacher version, there is also the Krämer version and the Cailleux version. In the Cailleux version the dog is black. The three versions are of uneven quality.

=== Further versions ===
The subject of the painting was very popular in the 18th and 19th century. It is therefore no surprise that the composition was imitated by many artists, including the engravers Augustin-Claude-Simon Legrand (1765–1815) and Niclas Lafrensen.

Many versions of La Gimblette were sold in the 19th and 20th centuries, painted by different artists. Some of these versions were also sold as works by Fragonard. Today, it is very difficult to tell them apart, as the descriptions in old sales catalogues were not always accurate and dimensions were often omitted. However, there are considerable differences in the quality of the various versions, which may also indicate whether a particular work was executed by a master.

== The Besenval version and the different versions of its engraving ==
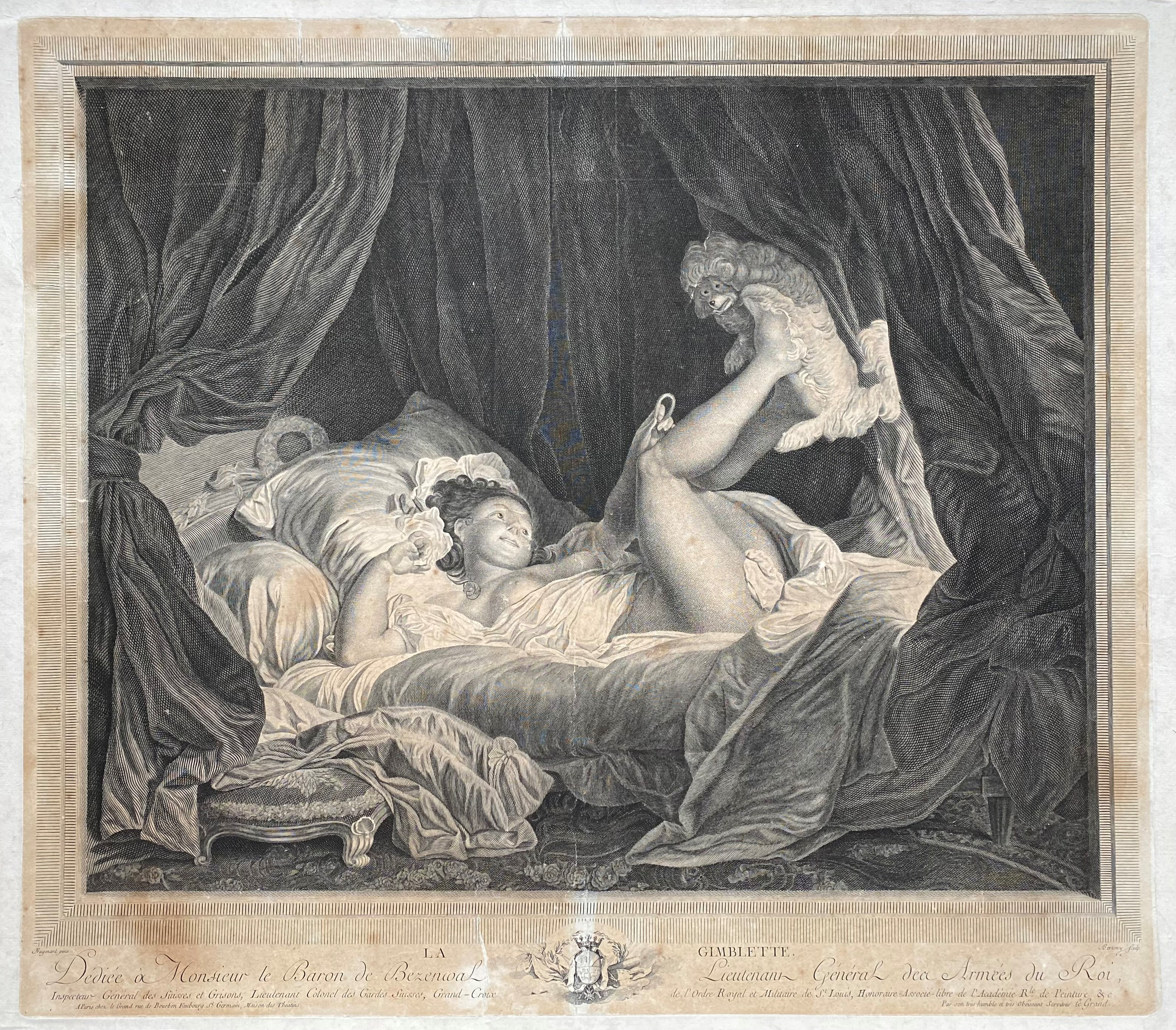
One of the rare engravings of the limited edition after the Besenval version of La Gimblette (clothed version) by Charles Bertony, dedicated to the Baron de Besenval (dedication to the baron and imprint of his family coat of arms). The dog looks like he's wearing a judge's wig or the long ceremonial wig of a King's Counsel, which could be seen as a caricature. Published in 1783.

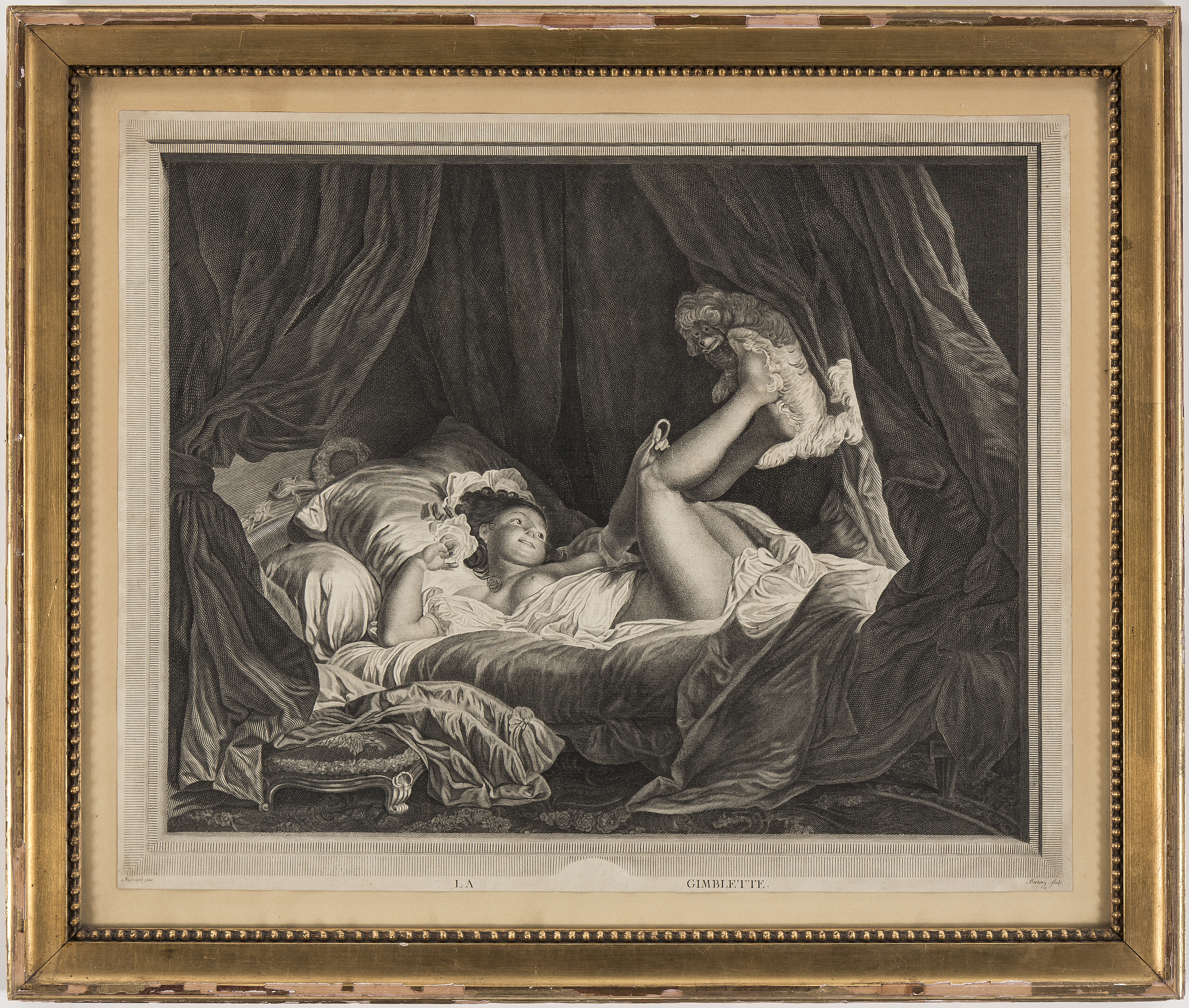
The standard version of the engraving after the Besenval version of La Gimblette (clothed version) by Charles Bertony. The execution of this version shows slight differences from the limited edition, dedicated to the Baron de Besenval (see folds in the bed linen). Published in 1783.

According to Luc-Vincent Thiéry's description in his guide on the city of Paris, published in 1787, the Baron de Besenval kept his version of La Gimblette in the boudoir in his house on the Rue de Grenelle, the Hôtel de Besenval, where he kept other paintings with similar motifs. After the baron's death in 1791, his heirs sold the entire contents of the Hôtel de Besenval at auction on 10 August 1795. The auctioneer, Alexandre Joseph Paillet, described the painting in the sales catalogue as follows:

Honoré Fragonard: A young girl is represented lying upon her back in a bed richly furnished, diverting herself with a pretty spaniel, to whom she offers a gimblette. This agreeable and tasteful composition is distinguished by a touching lightness of execution; it was engraved under the title « La Gimblette ». H. 26 in. wide. 32.T.[10]

This painting is considered lost. However, there is an engraving based on the Besenval version of the painting, executed by Charles Bertony in 1783 and dedicated to the Baron de Besenval.

It is possible that the Baron de Besenval bought La Gimblette from Jean-Baptiste-Pierre Lebrun. Lebrun is known to have traded paintings by Jean-Honoré Fragonard and the baron was one of his best customers. However, the baron could also have bought the painting directly from Jean-Honoré Fragonard, whom he knew personally.

It is therefore entirely conceivable that the Baron de Besenval's version was the original version of La Gimblette. It was around the time when Jean-Honoré Fragonard painted La Gimblette, that the baron bought his house on the Rue de Grenelle, the Hôtel Chanac de Pompadour, later renamed Hôtel de Besenval, which then needed to be furnished. And the baron spent lavishly on furniture and works of art. Furthermore, the baron had excellent contacts in the art world and also maintained personal contacts with artists. It is therefore not surprising that the baron was made an Honoraire Amateur of the Académie royale de peinture et de sculpture in 1784.

=== The engraving of the Besenval version ===
The engraving after the Besenval version by Charles Bertony, which was announced in the issue of 19 April 1783 of the Journal de Paris and of which a limited edition is dedicated to the Baron de Besenval, is also known by the title La Caroline, as reported in the issue of 10 August 1875 of the L'Intermédiaire des chercheurs et curieux. This name is an allusion to women suspected of a certain vice.

There are two versions of the engraving by Charles Bertony: A nude one and a clothed one. The nude version came with the following recommendation for the print dealers: This subject should not be displayed. It can therefore be assumed that even the audience of the Ancien Régime, accustomed to a certain degree of frivolity, viewed this engraving as a scandal.

Since the limited edition dedicated to the Baron de Besenval depicts the clothed version of La Gimblette, it can be assumed that this engraving corresponds to the now-lost original Besenval painting. By contrast, the nude version appears to exist only in the engraving by Charles Bertony, suggesting that Jean-Honoré Fragonard may never have painted such a variant. Furthermore, unlike the clothed version, the nude version lacks any reference to Fragonard along the edge of the image.

== The name La Gimblette ==
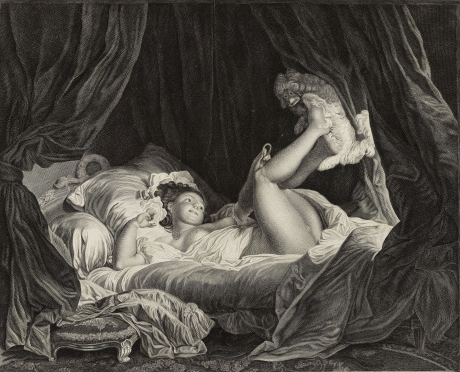
The nude version of the engraving after the Besenval version of La Gimblette by Charles Bertony, without any reference to Jean-Honoré Fragonard along the edge of the image. Published in 1783.

A gimblette is a type of French pastry that is dry and ring-shaped, originally from Albi, a town in southwestern France. In certain versions of La Gimblette – such as the Mühlbacher version and both versions of Charles Bertony's engraving – the young girl is shown offering such a pastry to the small dog. Since this detail appears in Bertony's engraving, it can be assumed that it was also present in the now-lost Besenval version.

Given the pastry's shape and the manner in which the girl presents it to the dog within the composition, the gesture may be interpreted as a deliberate double entendre with sexual innuendo, likely intended as such. However, this element is absent in the Munich version, where the girl is simply depicted playing with the dog.

The composition and the title of the painting should be understood in the context of the final decades of the Ancien Régime, a period often characterised as decadent. The Baron de Besenval aptly summarised this Zeitgeist in his memoirs:

"Men were occupied solely in enlarging the number of their mistresses, while women amused themselves by dismissing their lovers with great éclat."

— Pierre Victor, Baron de Besenval

== La Gimblette: An inspiration for the decor of the Baron de Besenval's nymphaeum ==
Jean-Honoré Fragonard was a master at creating suspense with erotic scenes. Several terracotta artworks by Claude Michel were more or less directly inspired by works by Jean-Honoré Fragonard. Claude Michel delivered several of his artworks to the Baron de Besenval. Furthermore, he was also responsible for the artistic decoration of the baron's nymphaeum, which the baron had built in 1782 by the architect Alexandre-Théodore Brongniart in the basement of his house, the Hôtel de Besenval. It is therefore quite possible that Claude Michel was also inspired by the works of Fragonard, especially by the painting La Gimblette, when he created the large reliefs with erotic scenes for the baron's nymphaeum, such as the relief titled Pan pursuing Syrinx under the gaze of Cupid, which is now part of the collections of the Louvre.
