= Alexandre Joseph Paillet =

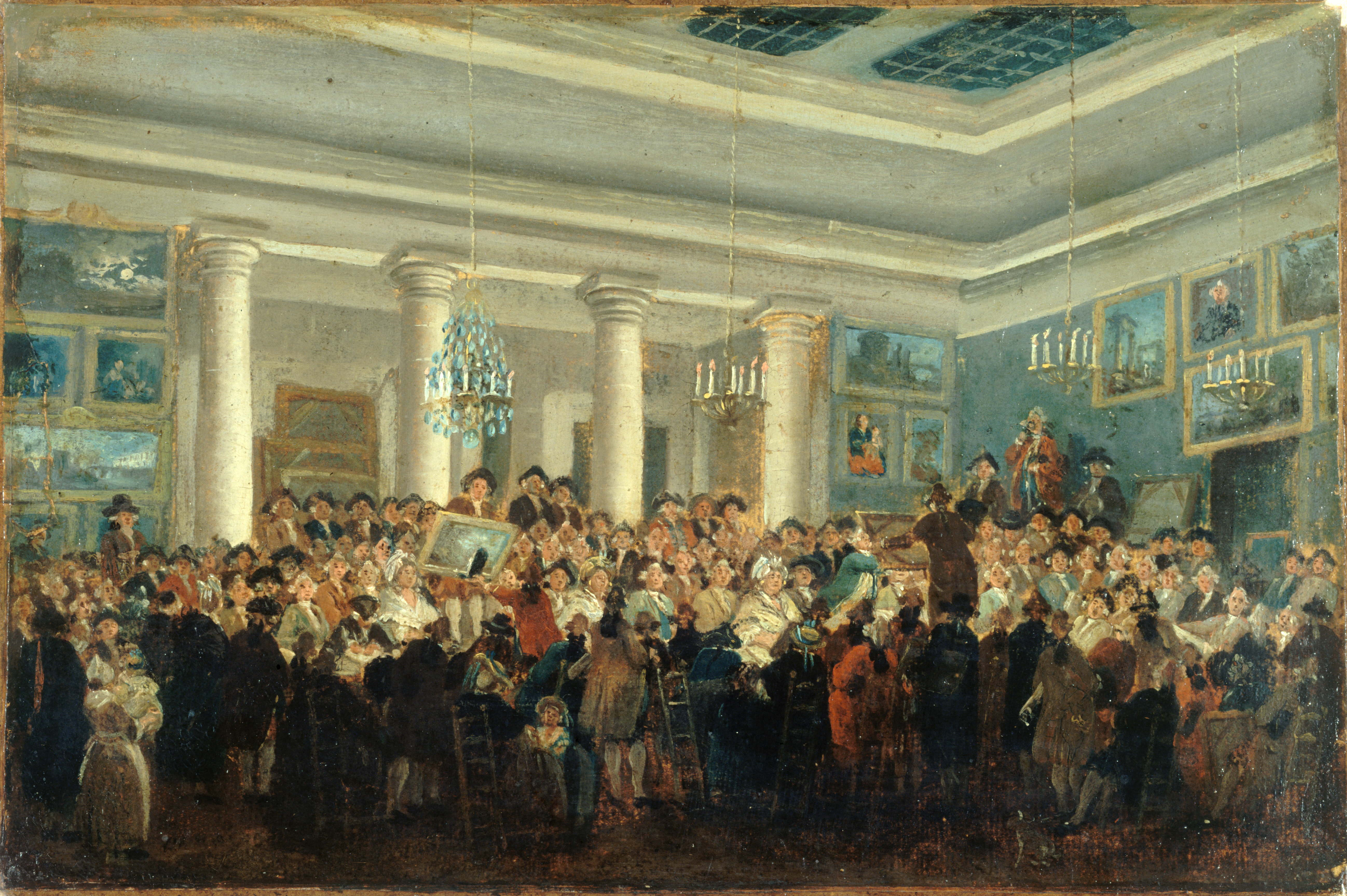
An auction conducted by Alexandre Joseph Paillet at the Hôtel Bullion, around 1785, by Pierre-Antoine Demachy.

Alexandre Joseph Paillet (1743–1814) was a prominent Parisian auctioneer and art dealer in the late 18th century, holding 145 sales between the years 1774 and 1793. He also served as an agent to The Crown from 1777 to 1789, acquiring paintings for the museum in the Louvre. Paillet was the principal rival to Jean-Baptiste-Pierre Le Brun.

== Biography ==
Little is known about Alexandre Joseph Paillet's early life. There are few sources and the information is sparse. Alexandre Joseph Paillet was born in Paris on 21 March 1743. He was the youngest of three children of Pierre Paillet, a master tailor, and Marie-Anne Paillet, née Dugué-Desnoyers. He obviously trained as a painter and restorer, as he became a member of the Académie de Saint-Luc in 1771. This was a very common starting point for people who later wanted to work in the art trade.

=== Art dealer and auctioneer ===
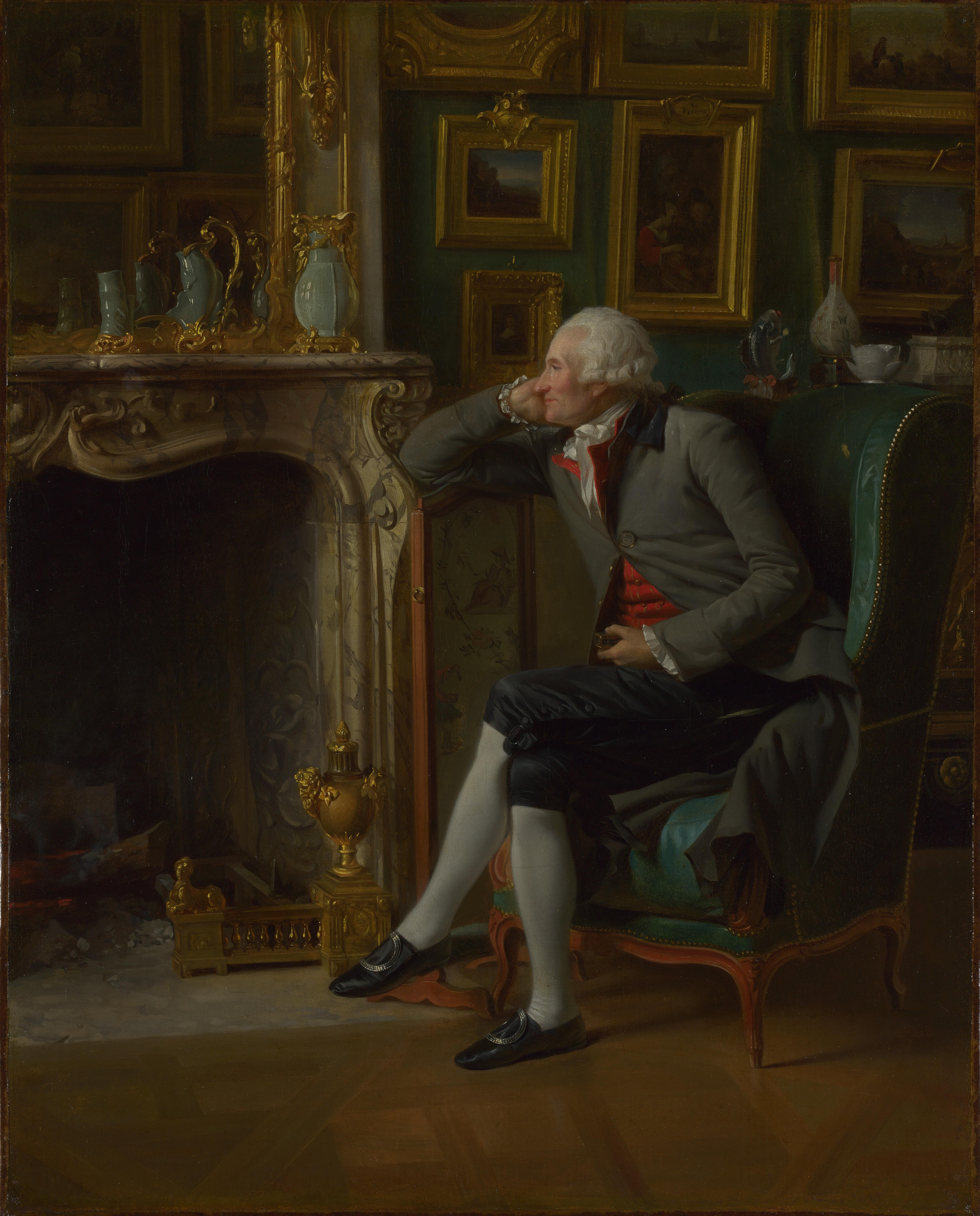
Le Baron de Besenval dans son salon de compagnie at the Hôtel de Besenval, by Henri-Pierre Danloux (1791). The green Chinese celadon vases mounted in gilt bronze, which are visible on the mantelpiece, were sold together with their identical pendants on 10 August 1795 by Alexandre Joseph Paillet at the sale of the collection of the Baron de Besenval as lot 148. After nearly 230 years, these pieces reappeared on the auction market. On 8 July 2021, the six pieces (three pairs) of the Baron de Besenval Garniture were sold in three lots (lots 4, 5 and 6) by Christie's in London in The Exceptional Sale for a total of GBP 1,620,000.

In 1768, Alexandre-Joseph Paillet made his first steps in the art trade when he bought paintings at auctions, which he later resold. As one would expect at the time, Paillet primarily purchased paintings from The Three Painting Schools (France, Italy and the Netherlands). However, after assisting at auctions for six years, he then entered the auction business himself. Paillet held his first auction on 17 February 1774. Between 1777 and 1787, he also went on study trips abroad, amongst others to England and the Netherlands, in order to further deepen his general knowledge of art and art history.

Paillet, who was always a dealer and an auctioneer at the same time, increasingly appeared as an important bidder at auctions from the 1770s onwards. It was the auction of the famous collection of Louis-François Trouard in 1779 that gave a boost to his career as an auctioneer. In addition, his career was certainly helped by the fact that he increasingly acted as an agent for Charles Claude Flahaut de La Billarderie, Comte d'Angiviller, in the acquisition of paintings for the king's private collection as well as for the museum in the Louvre.

==== At the peak of his career: The Hôtel Bullion and the Besenval Collection ====
Between 1774 and 1775 Alexandre Joseph Paillet and his wife, Marie-Félicité-Thecle, née Soisson, lived on the Rue Thibautodé, where Paillet also held his first auctions. On 10 April 1775, they moved into the Hôtel Schomberg d'Aligre on the Rue Saint-Honoré, where they, together with the art dealer Charles-André Mercier (1741–1823) and his wife, rented residential and business premises.

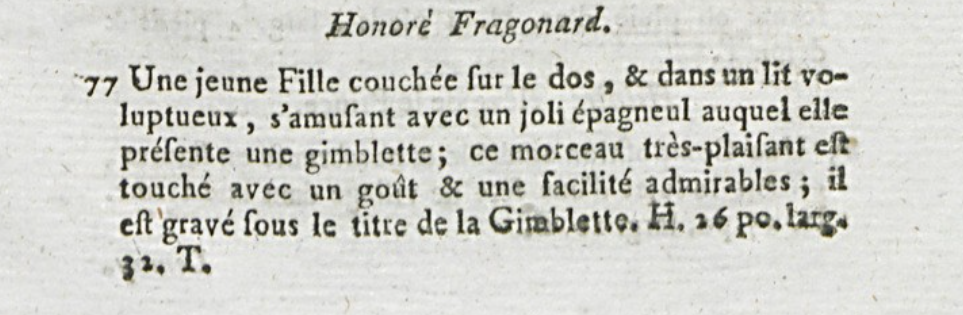
Excerpt from the auction catalogue by Alexandre Joseph Paillet for the Besenval Collection: Lot 77 – La Gimblette by Jean-Honoré Fragonard, the Baron de Besenval's favourite painting.

On 21 April 1775, Paillet conducted the first auction at the Hôtel Schomberg d'Aligre. However, only three years later, on 5 October 1778, after Mercier's bankruptcy, Paillet bought land and buildings attached to the Hôtel Bullion on the Rue Plâtrière, now called Rue Jean-Jacques-Rousseau. Paillet had the premises converted into his new residence and business location by the architect Ange-Jacques Gabriel. It was here, in the 1780s and early 1790s, that Paillet experienced the height of his career. Paillet was now increasingly entrusted with the sale of large and important collections. Even though his business premises were no longer in the Hôtel Bullion at this point, it was on 10 August 1795 that he held one of his most famous auctions: The sale of the entire contents of the Hôtel de Besenval. The sale also included a version of the famous painting La Gimblette by Jean-Honoré Fragonard (lot 77). The proceeds from the sale of the collection of Pierre Victor, Baron de Besenval de Brunstatt, a Swiss military officer in French service, were almost two million livres. An enormous sum.

==== The loss of the Hôtel Bullion ====
However, although he was professionally successful, Alexandre Joseph Paillet always had to struggle with financial difficulties, especially since he had bought parts of the Hôtel Bullion. On 30 July 1793, he had to sell his premises in the Hôtel Bullion. Until the end of August 1794, Paillet continued his business at the Hôtel Bullion. He then moved his business to different addresses. The last address, where Paillet conducted auctions, was in the outbuildings of the Mont-de-piété at 24 and 25 Rue Vivienne in Paris. Paillet also served as garde-magasin (storekeeper) of the Mont-de-piété until his death on 16 January 1814.

=== Marriage, children and grandchildren ===
On 9 May 1773, Alexandre Joseph Paillet married Marie-Félicité-Thecle Soisson. They had about five children. To be mentioned are:

- Marie-Clémentine-Joséphine-Louise Paillet who married the painter Alexis-Nicolas Pérignon Le jeune (1785–1854). Their son Alexis-Joseph Pérignon became a painter too. In 1856, Alexis-Joseph became director of the École nationale supérieure d'art de Dijon as well as director of the Musée des Beaux-Arts de Dijon.
- Jeanne-Félicité-Julie Paillet who married Antoine Sauzay (1743–1824). One of their sons was the violinist Charles Eugène Sauzay.

== Legacy ==
The core of the collection of Dutch masters in the Louvre essentially goes back to the collecting activities of Charles Claude Flahaut de La Billarderie, Comte d'Angiviller, on behalf of The Crown, as well as the professional advice of Alexandre Joseph Paillet.

== Gallery ==
Alexandre Joseph Paillet is associated with the following paintings, amongst others:

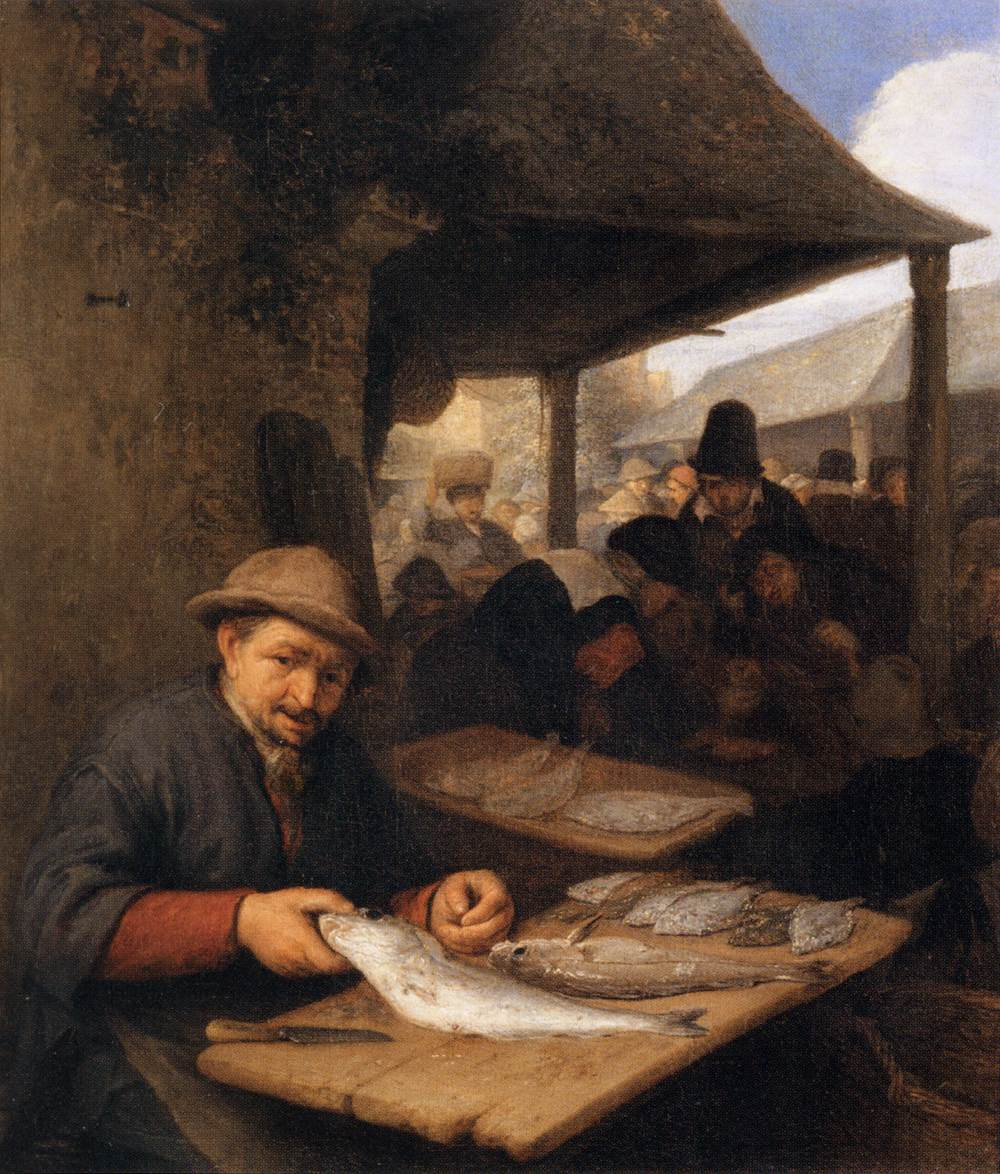
Adriaen van Ostade: The Fish Market

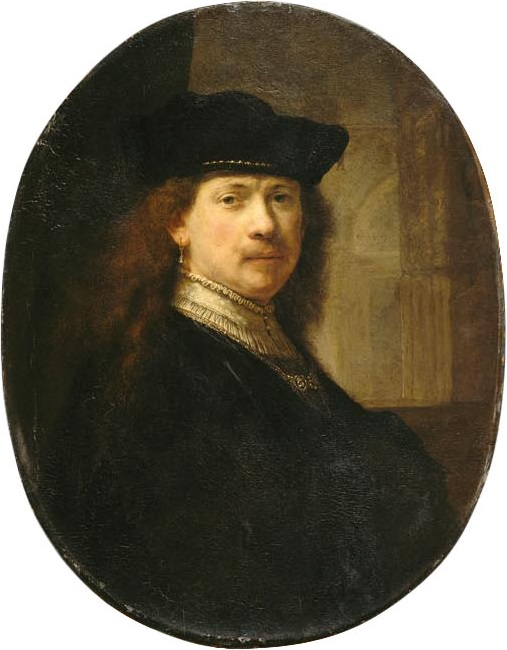
Rembrandt van Rijn: Self-Portrait with an Architectural Background

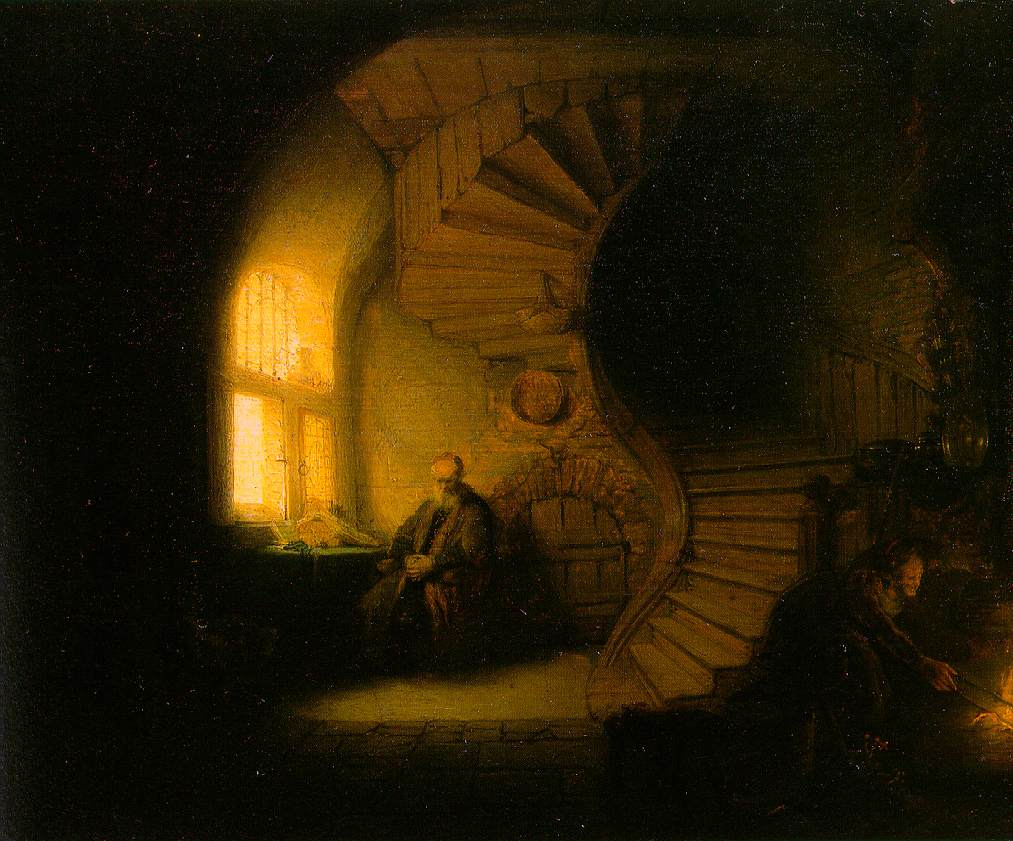
Rembrandt van Rijn: Philosopher in Meditation

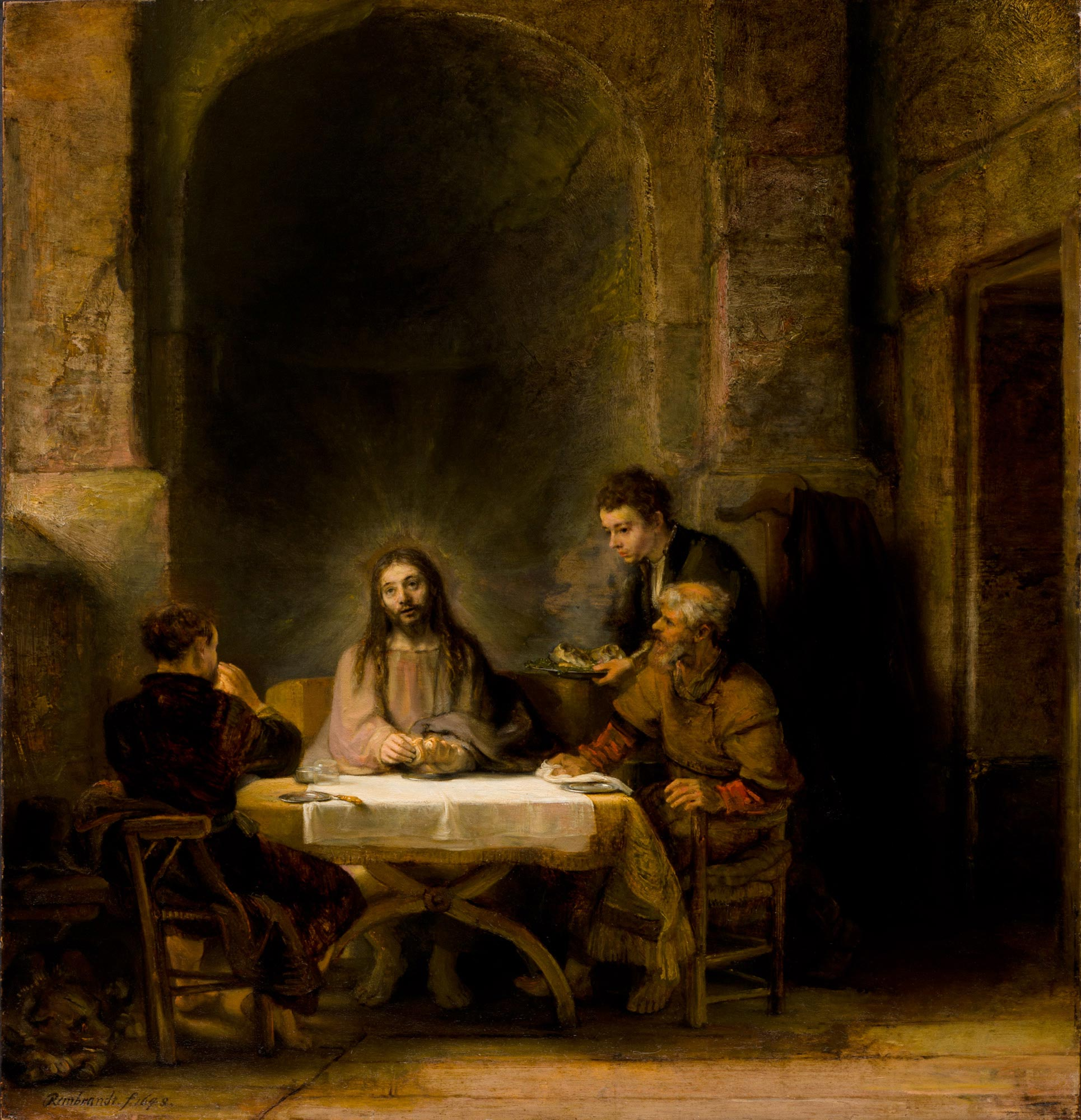
Rembrandt van Rijn: Supper at Emmaus

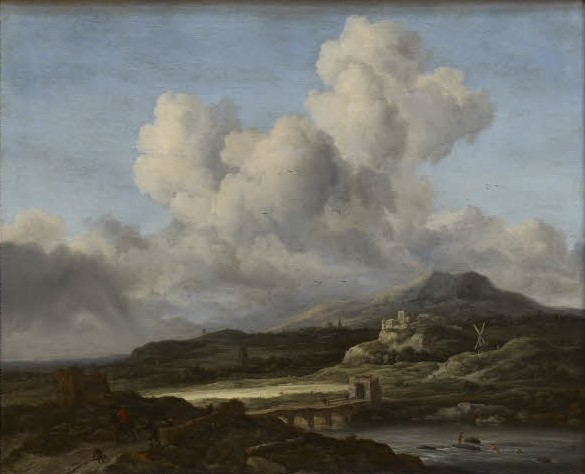
Jacob van Ruisdael: Le Coup de soleil

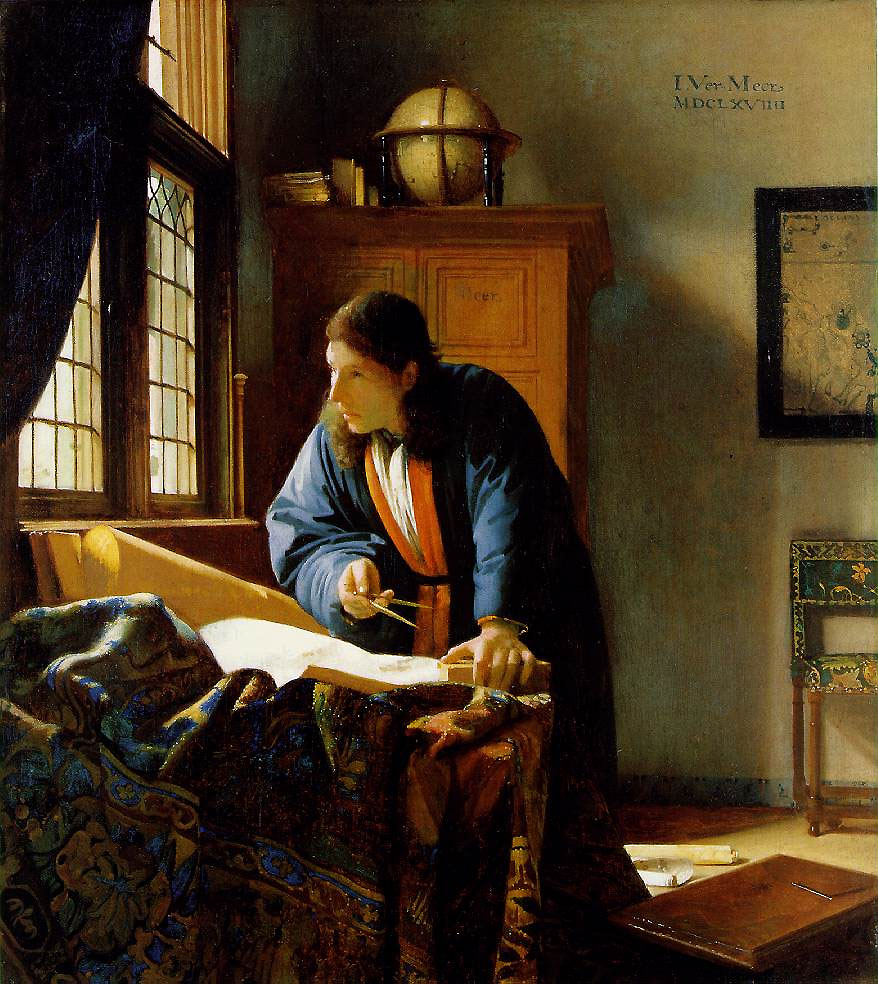
Johannes Vermeer: The Geographer

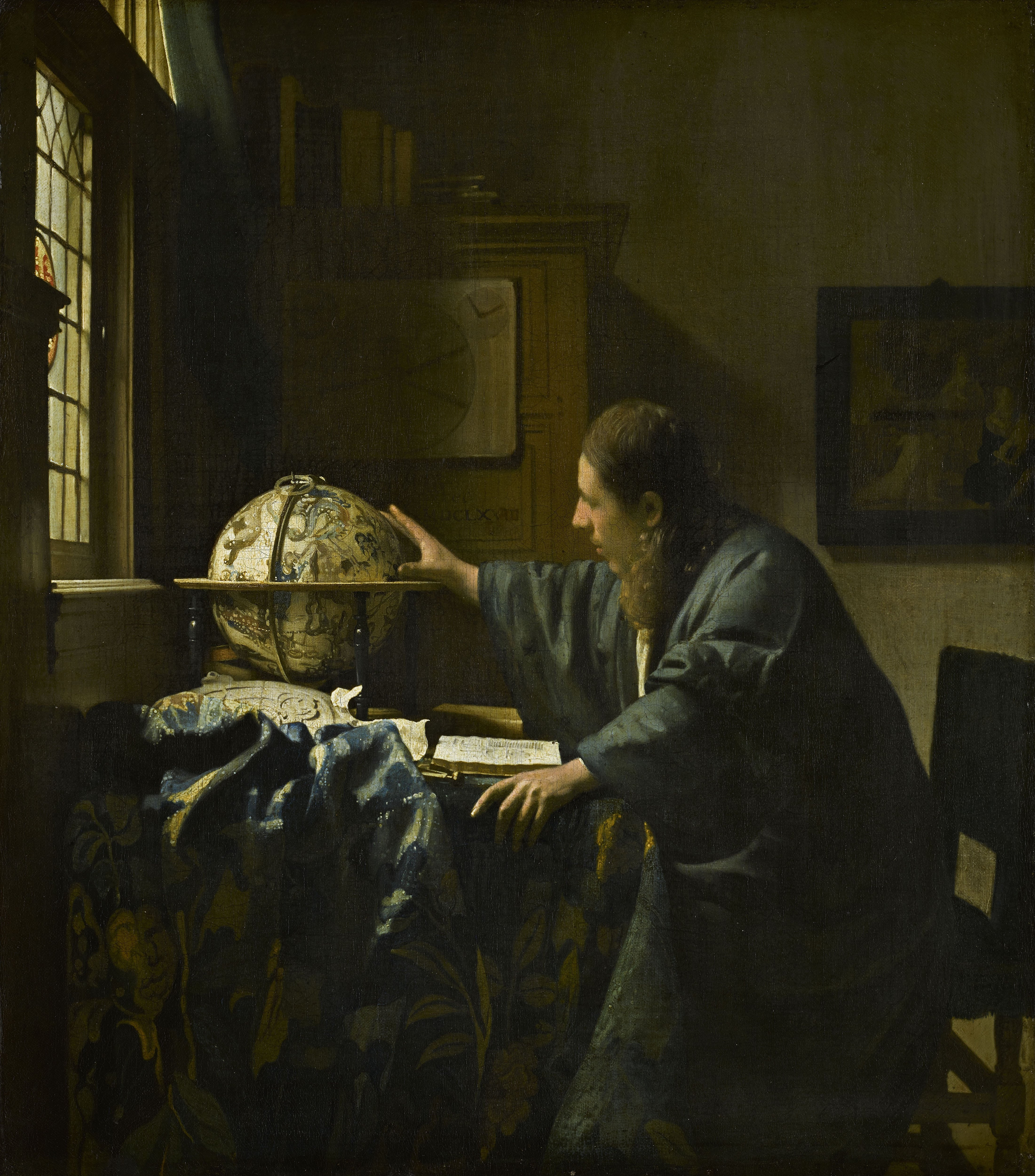
Johannes Vermeer: The Astronomer

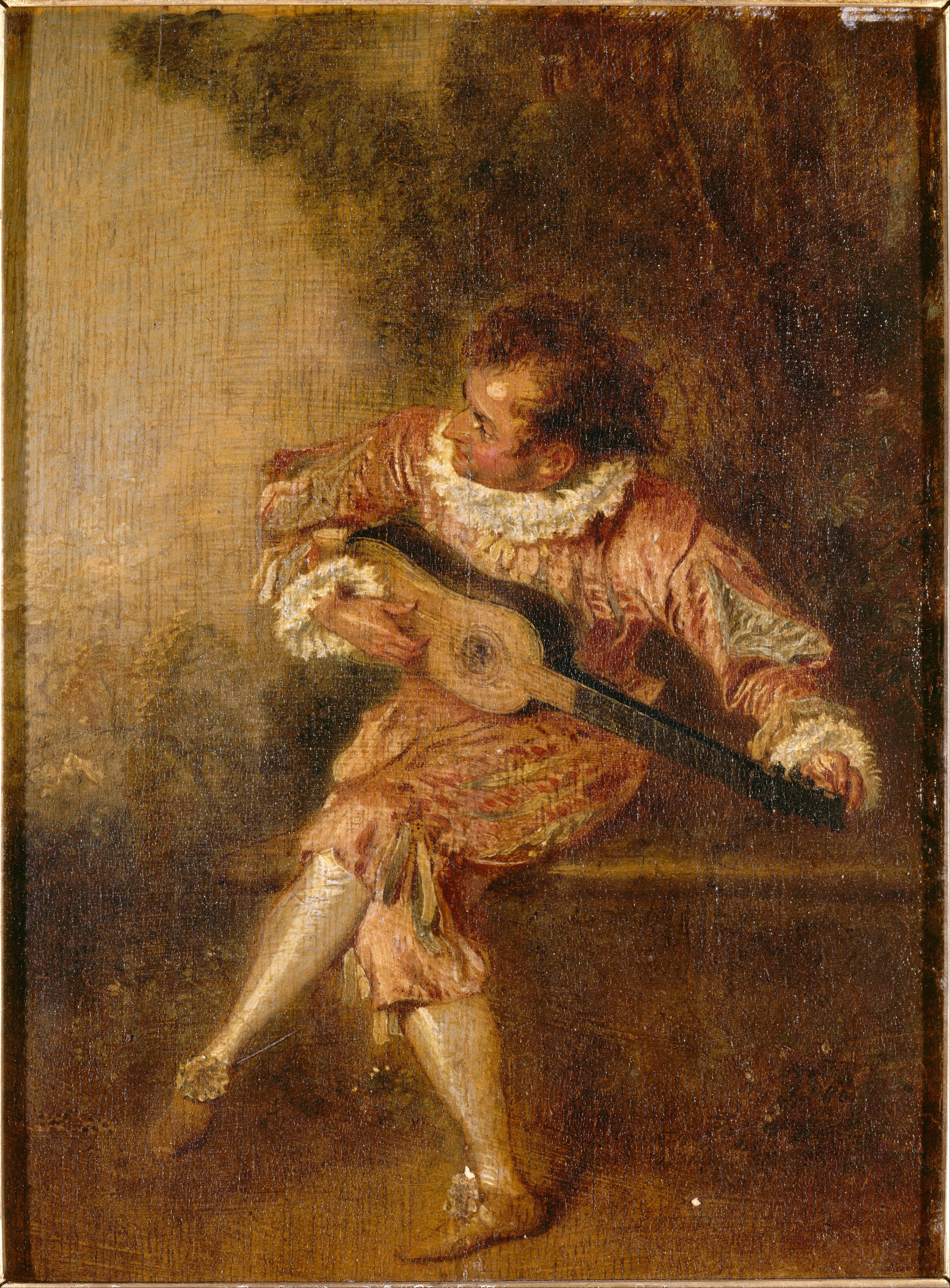
Antoine Watteau: The Chord
