= Élisabeth Vigée Le Brun =

French portrait painter (1755–1842)

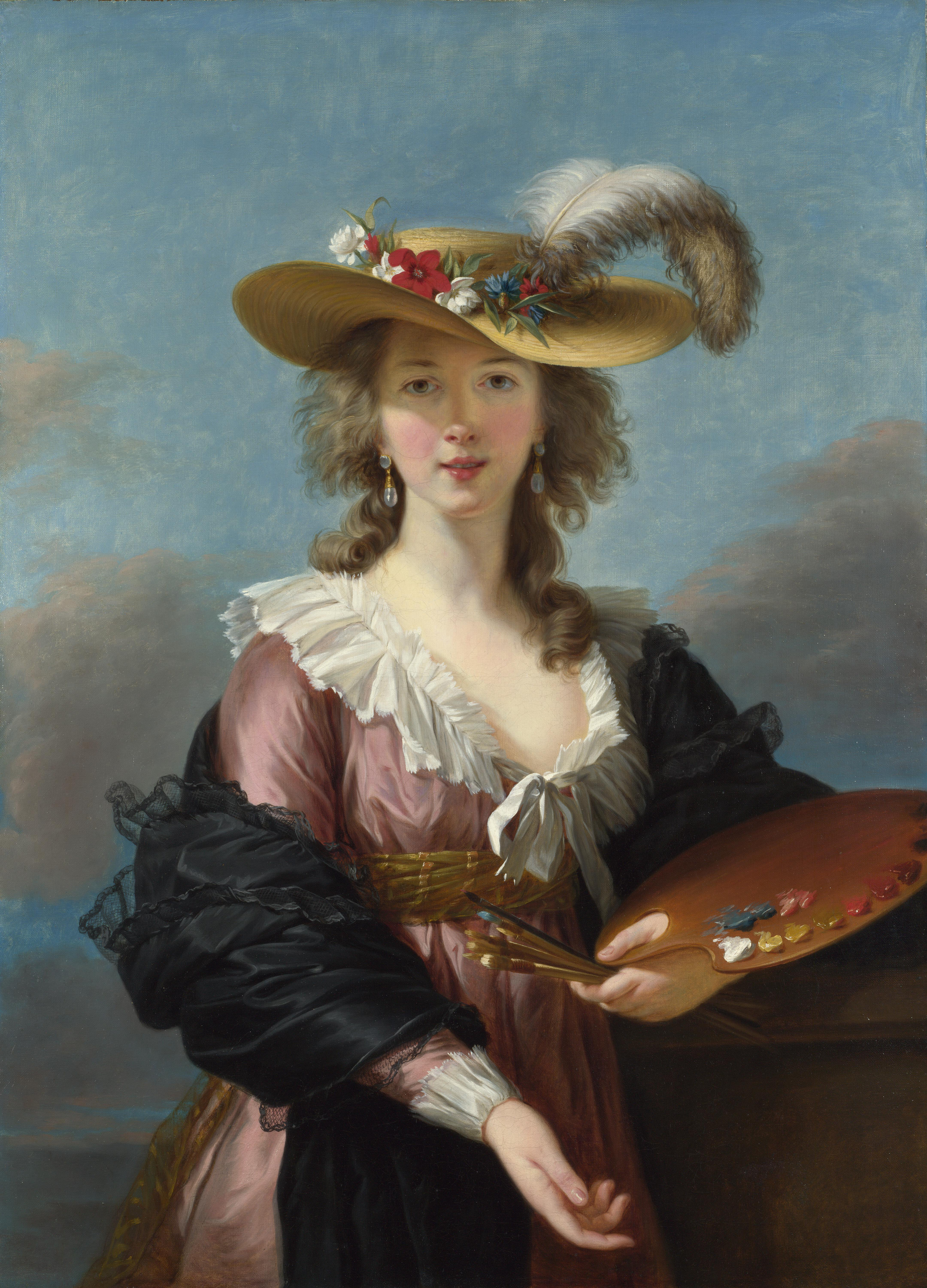
- Self-Portrait in a Straw Hat, 1782
- Born: Élisabeth Louise Vigée; 16 April 1755; Paris, Kingdom of France
- Died: 30 March 1842 (aged 86); Paris, Kingdom of France
- Notable work: Marie Antoinette with a Rose; Self-Portrait in a Straw Hat; Life Study of Lady Hamilton as the Cumaean Sybil
- Movement: High Rococo; Neoclassicism
- Spouse: Jean-Baptiste-Pierre Le Brun (m. 1776; div. 1793)
- Children: 2, including Julie
- Parents: Louis Vigée (father); Jeanne Maissin (mother)

Signature
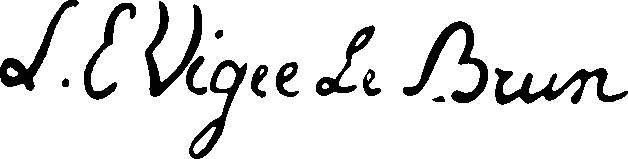

Élisabeth Louise Vigée Le Brun (Note: There are several variant spellings: ULAN prefers LeBrun, RKD uses Elisabeth Vigée-Le Brun and so on.) (French: [elizabɛt lwiz viʒe lə bʁœ̃]; née Vigée; 16 April 1755 – 30 March 1842), also known as Louise Élisabeth Vigée Le Brun or simply Madame Le Brun, was a French painter who mostly specialized in portrait painting, in the late 18th and early 19th centuries.

Her artistic style is generally considered part of the aftermath of Rococo with elements of an adopted Neoclassical style. Her subject matter and color palette can be classified as Rococo, but her style is aligned with the emergence of Neoclassicism. Vigée Le Brun created a name for herself in Ancien Régime society by serving as the portrait painter to Marie Antoinette. She enjoyed the patronage of European aristocrats, actors, and writers, and was elected to art academies in ten cities. Some famous contemporary artists, such as Joshua Reynolds, viewed her as one of the greatest portraitists of her time, comparing her with Flemish (notably Rubens) and the old Dutch masters.

Vigée Le Brun created 660 portraits and 200 landscapes. In addition to many works in private collections, her paintings are owned by major museums, such as the Louvre in Paris, Hermitage Museum in Saint Petersburg, National Gallery in London, Metropolitan Museum of Art in New York, and many other collections in Europe and the United States. Her personal habitus was characterized by a high sensitivity to sound, sight and smell. Between 1835 and 1837, when Vigée Le Brun was in her eighties, with the help of her nieces Caroline Rivière and Eugénie Tripier Le Franc, she published her memoirs in three volumes (Souvenirs), some of which are in epistolary format. (Note: These memoirs are partially penned by her niece, this opened a debate for their authenticity.) They also contain many pen portraits as well as advice for young portraitists.

== Biography ==
=== Early life ===
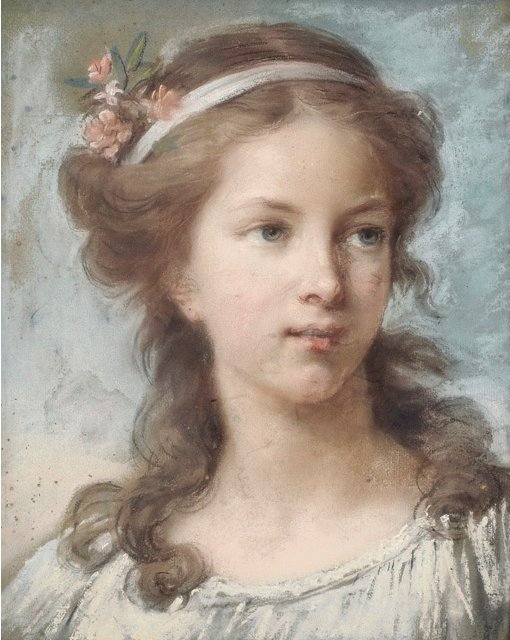
Self-portrait at age sixteen, 1771, pastel.

Born in Paris on 16 April 1755, Élisabeth Louise Vigée was the daughter of Jeanne (née Maisin; 1728–1800), a hairdresser from a peasant background, and Louis Vigée (1715–1767), a portraitist, pastellist and member of the Académie de Saint-Luc, who mostly specialized in painting with oils. Élisabeth exhibited artistic inclinations from her childhood, making a sketch of a bearded man at the age of seven or eight; when he first saw her sketches her father was jubilant and exclaimed that "You will be a painter my child, if there ever was one", and started to give her lessons in art. In 1760, at the age of five, she had entered a convent, where she remained until 1766. She then worked as an assistant to her father's friend, the painter and poet Pierre Davesne, with whom she learned more about painting. Her father died when she was 12 years old, from infections after several surgical operations. In 1768, her mother married a wealthy but mean jeweller, Jacques-François Le Sèvre, and shortly after, the family moved to the Rue Saint-Honoré, close to the Palais Royal.

In her memoir, Vigée Le Brun directly stated her feelings about her stepfather: "I hated this man; even more so since he made use of my father's personal possessions. He wore his clothes, just as they were, without altering them to fit his figure." During this period, Élisabeth benefited from the advice of Gabriel François Doyen, Jean-Baptiste Greuze, and Joseph Vernet. Greuze's influence is evident in her portrait of her younger brother, playwright and poet Étienne Vigée.

After her father's death, her mother sought to raise her spirits by taking her to the Palais de Luxembourg's art gallery; seeing the works of Peter Paul Rubens and other old masters left a great impression on her. She also visited numerous private galleries, including those of Rendon de Boisset, the Duc de Praslin [fr], and the Marquis de Levis; the artist took notes and copied the works of old masters such as Van Dyck, Rubens and Rembrandt to improve her art. At an early age, she reversed the order of her given Christian names, and was known among her inner circle as 'Louise'. For most of her life, she signed her paintings, documents and letters as "Louise Élisabeth Vigée Le Brun", although she acknowledged later in life that the correct baptismal order would be Élisabeth Louise.

By the time she was in her early teens, Élisabeth was painting portraits professionally. She greatly disliked the contemporary High Rococo fashion, and often solicited her sitters to allow her to alter their apparel. Inspired by Raphael and Domenichino, she often draped her subjects in shawls and long scarves; these styles would later become ubiquitous in her portraiture. After her studio was seized for her practicing without a license, she applied to the Académie de Saint-Luc, which unwittingly exhibited her works in its Salon. In 1774, she was made a member of the Académie. Her studio's reputation saw a meteoric rise, and her renown spread outside France. By 1774, she had painted portraits which included those of the Comte Orloff, Comte Pierre Chouvaloff [ru] (one of Empress Elizabeth's favorites), the Comtesse de Brionne [fr], the Duchess of Orléans (future mother of King Louis Philippe), the Marquis de Choiseul, and the Chancellor de Aguesseau, among many others. In 1776, she received her first royal commission, to paint the portrait of the Comte de Provence (the future King Louis XVIII).

After her stepfather retired from his business, he moved his family to the Hôtel de Lubert in Paris where she met Jean-Baptiste-Pierre Le Brun, a painter, art dealer and relation of the painter Charles Le Brun, on the Rue de Cléry where they lodged. Élisabeth visited M. Le Brun's apartments frequently to view his private collection of paintings, which included examples from many different schools. He agreed to her request to borrow some of the paintings in order to copy them and improve her skills, which she saw as one of the greatest boons of artistic instruction she had received. After residing in the Hôtel de Lubert for six months, M. Le Brun asked for the artist's hand in marriage. Élisabeth was in a dilemma as to whether to agree or refuse the offer; she had a steady source of income from her rising career as an artist and her future was secure; as such, she wrote, she had never contemplated marriage. On her mother's urging and goaded by her desire to be separated from her stepfather's worsening temperament, Élisabeth agreed, though her doubts were such that she was still hesitant on her wedding day on 11 January 1776; she was twenty years old. The wedding took place in great privacy in the Saint-Eustache church, with only two banns being read, and was kept secret for some time at the request of her husband, who was officially engaged to another woman at the time in an attempt to secure a lucrative art deal with a Dutch art dealer. Élisabeth acceded to his request as she was reluctant to give up her now famous maiden name. In 1778, she and her husband contracted to purchase the Hôtel de Lubert. In this same year, she became the official painter to the Queen.

During the two weeks after the wedding had taken place in secret, the artist was visited by a stream of people giving her ominous news regarding her husband, these people believing that she had still not agreed to his proposal. These visitors started with the court jeweller, followed by the Duchesse de Arenberg and Mme de Souza, the Portuguese ambassadress, who passed stories of M. Le Brun's habits as a spendthrift and womanizer. Élisabeth would later regret this match as she found these rumors to be true, though she wrote that in spite of his faults he was still an agreeable and obliging man with a sweet nature. However, she frequently condemned his gambling and adulterous habits in her memoirs, as these left her in a financially critical position at the time of her flight from France. Her relationship with him deteriorated later so much that she demanded the refund of her dowry from M. Le Brun in 1802. Vigée Le Brun began exhibiting her work at their home, and the salons she held there supplied her with many new and important contacts.

Her husband's great-great-uncle was Charles Le Brun, the first director of the French Academy under Louis XIV. Her husband appropriated most of her income and pressed her to also take on the role of a private tutor to increase his income from her. The artist found tutoring to be frustrating due to her inability to assert authority over her pupils, most of whom were older than her, and found the distraction from her work irritating; she renounced tutoring soon after she had begun.

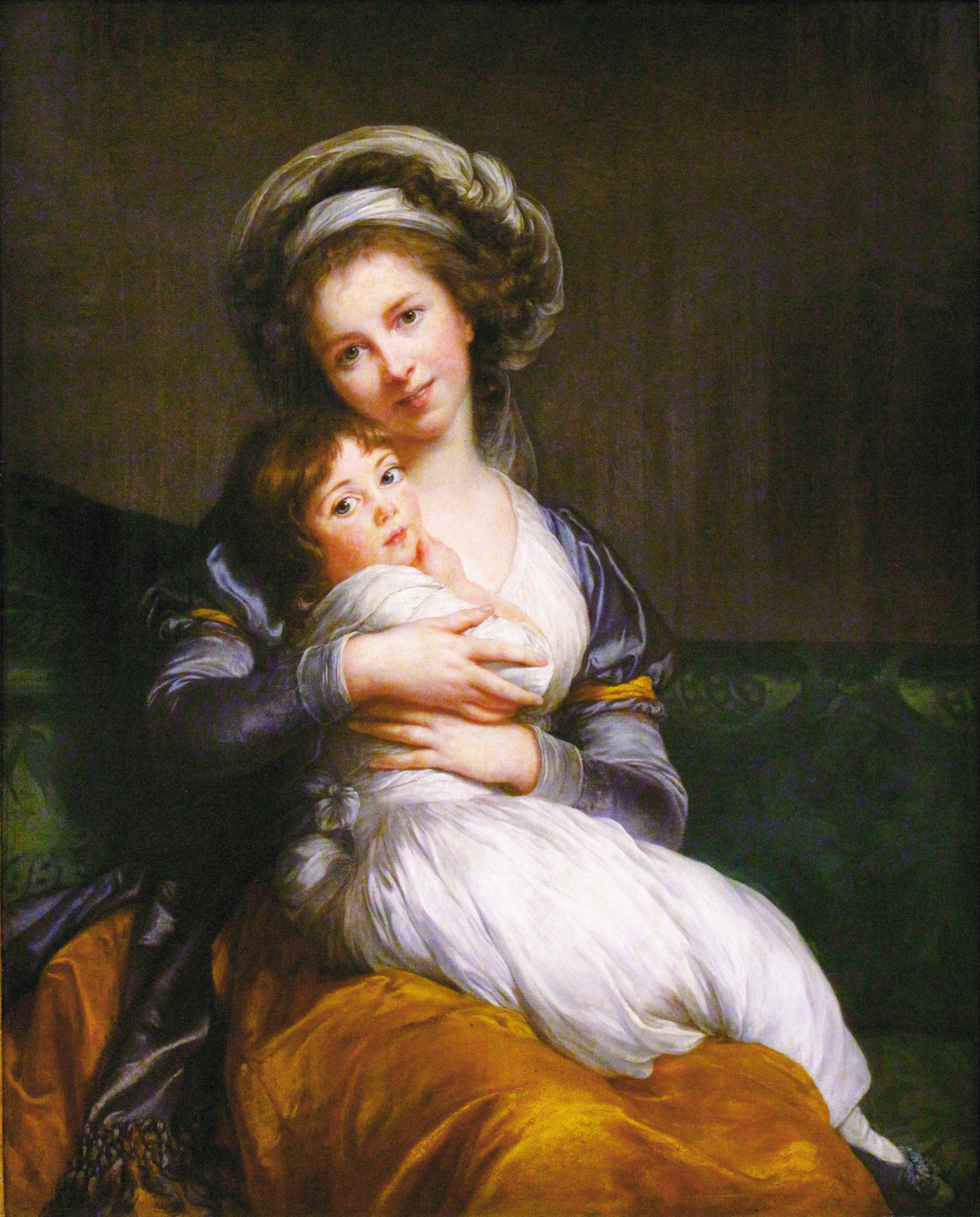
Self-portrait with her Daughter Julie, 1786, Louvre Museum

After two years of marriage, Vigée Le Brun became pregnant, and on 12 February 1780, she gave birth to a daughter, Jeanne Lucie Louise, whom she called Julie and nicknamed "Brunette". In 1784, she gave birth to a second child who died in infancy. (Note: Le Brun does not mention this child anywhere in her memoirs.)

In 1781, she and her husband toured Flanders, Brussels and the Netherlands, where seeing the works of the Flemish masters inspired her to try new techniques. Her Self-portrait in a Straw Hat (1782) was a "free imitation" of Rubens's Le Chapeau de Paille. Dutch and Flemish influences have also been noted in The Comte d'Espagnac (1786) and Portrait of Madame Perregaux (1789).

In yet another of the series of scandals that marked her early career, her 1784 Portrait of Charles Alexandre de Calonne depicting Louis XVI's minister of finance, Charles Alexandre de Calonne, was the target of a public scandal after it was exhibited in the Salon of 1785. Rumors circulated that the minister had paid the artist a very large sum of money, while other rumors circulated that she had had an affair with de Calonne. The famous Paris Opera soprano Sophie Arnould commented on the portrait "Madame Le Brun had cut off his legs so he could not escape". More rumors and scandals followed soon after as, to the painter's dismay, M. Le Brun began building a mansion on the Rue de-Gros-Chenet, with the public claiming that de Calonne was financing the new home – although her husband did not finish constructing the house until 1801, shortly before her return to France after her long exile. She was also rumored to have had another affair, with Joseph Hyacinthe François de Paule de Rigaud, Comte de Vaudreuil, who was one of her most devoted patrons. Their correspondence published later strongly affirmed the status of this affair. These rumors spiraled into an extensive defamation campaign targeting the painter throughout 1785.

In 1787, she caused a minor public scandal when her Self-portrait with her Daughter Julie was exhibited at that year's Salon showing her smiling and open-mouthed, which was in direct contravention of traditional painting conventions going back to antiquity. The court gossip-sheet Mémoires secrets commented: "An affectation which artists, art-lovers and persons of taste have been united in condemning, and which finds no precedent among the Ancients, is that in smiling, [Madame Vigée LeBrun] shows her teeth." In light of this and her other Self-portrait with her Daughter Julie (1789), Simone de Beauvoir dismissed Vigée Le Brun as narcissistic in The Second Sex (1949): "Madame Vigée-Lebrun never wearied of putting her smiling maternity on her canvases."

In 1788, Vigée Le Brun was impressed with the faces of the Mysorean ambassadors of Tipu-Sultan, and solicited their approval to take their portraits. The ambassador responded by saying he would only agree if the request came from the King, which Vigée Le Brun procured, and she proceeded to paint the portrait of Dervish Khan, followed by a group portrait of the ambassador and his son.

=== Marie Antoinette ===
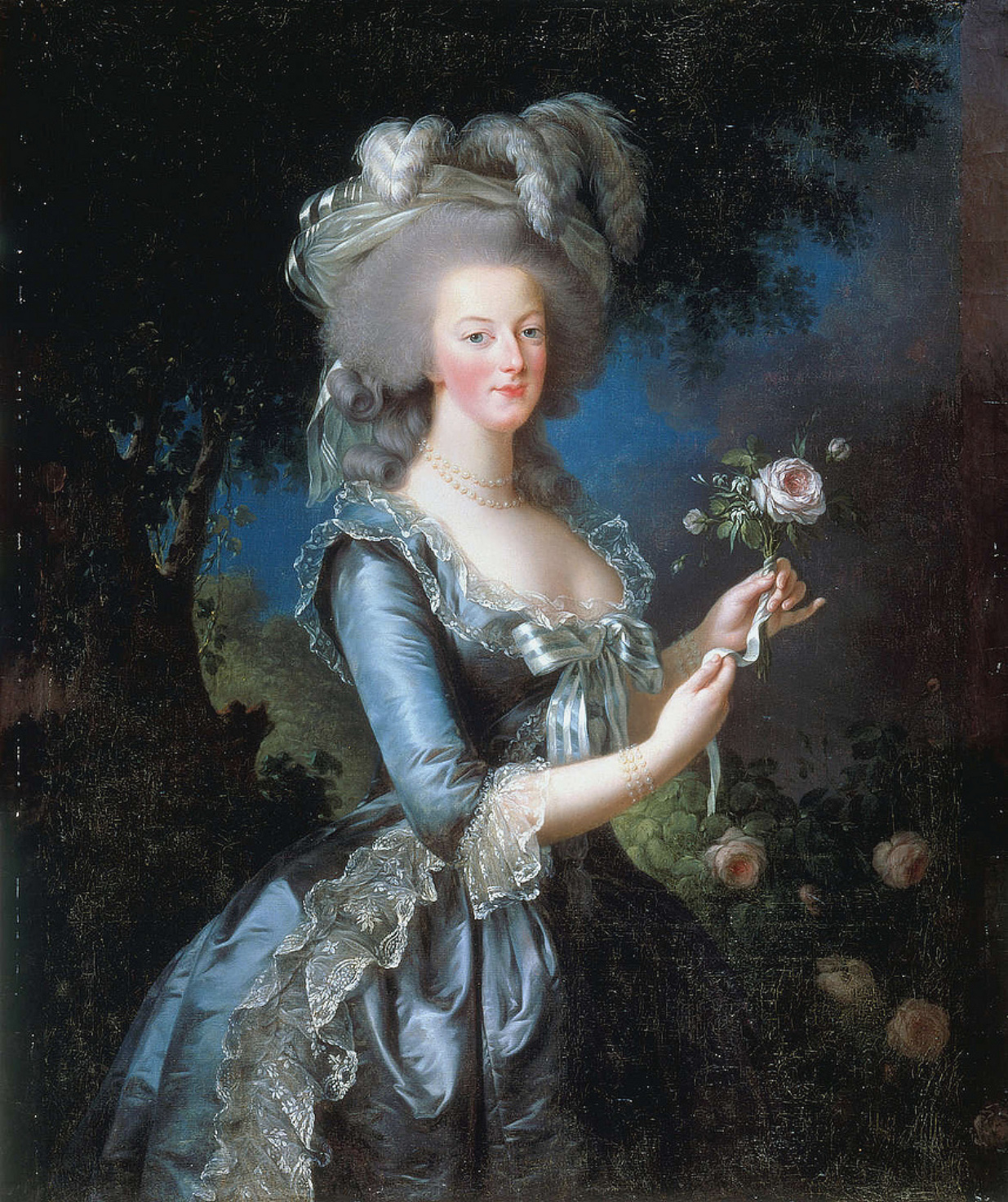
Marie Antoinette with a Rose, 1783. Palace of Versailles.

As her career blossomed, Vigée Le Brun was granted patronage by Marie Antoinette. She painted more than 30 portraits of the Queen and her family, leading to the common perception that she was the official portraitist of Marie Antoinette. At the Salon of 1783, Vigée Le Brun exhibited Marie-Antoinette in a Muslin Dress (1783), sometimes called Marie-Antoinette en Gaulle, in which the Queen chose to be shown in a simple, informal cotton muslin dress, usually worn as an undergarment. Despite the grand hat, a scandal was prompted by both the informality of the attire and the Queen's decision to be shown in that way. Vigée Le Brun immediately had the portrait removed from the Salon and quickly repainted it, this time with the Queen in more formal attire. After this scandal, the prices of Vigée Le Brun's paintings soared.

==== Marie Antoinette and her Children 1787 ====
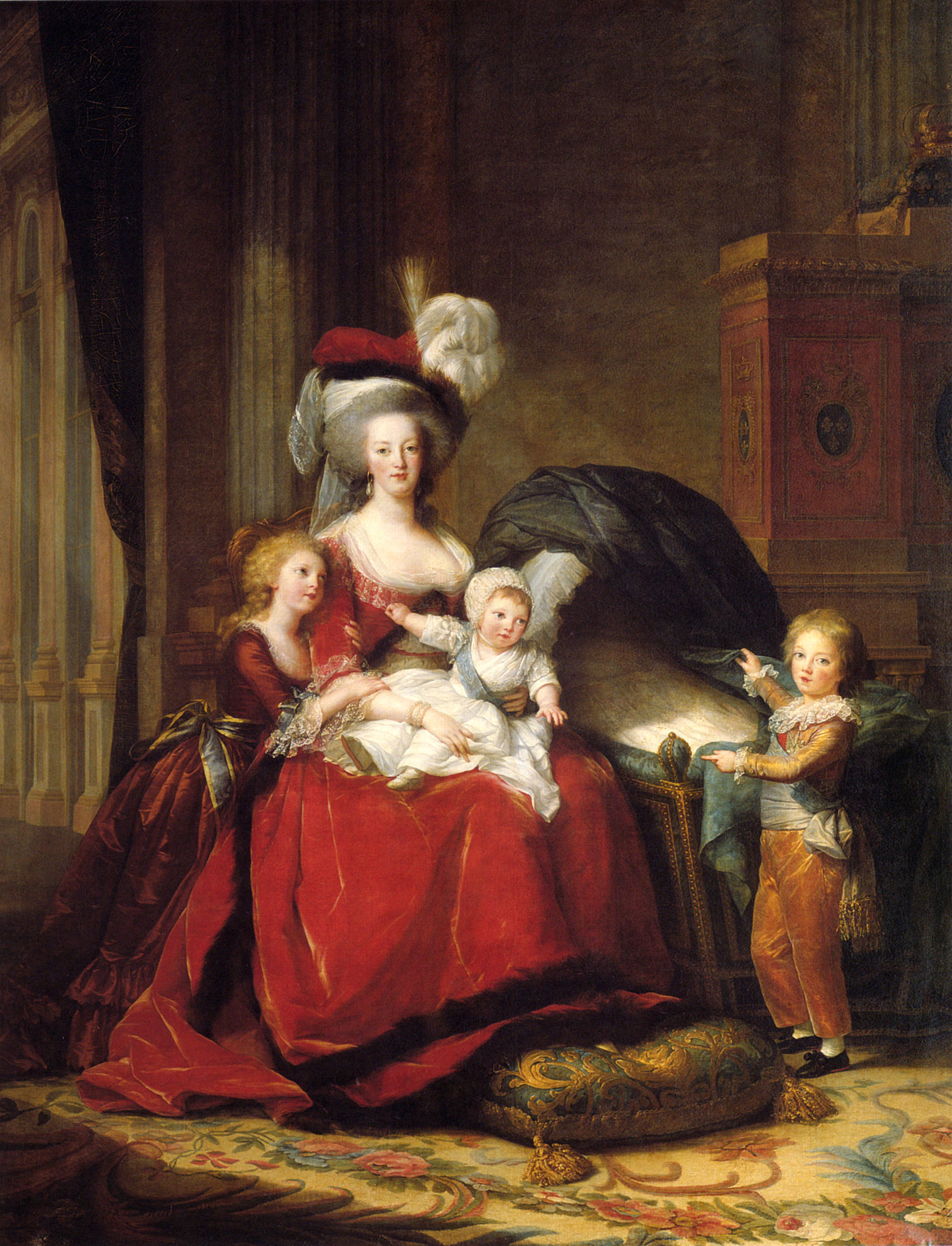
Marie Antoinette and her Children, 1787, Palace of Versailles. During the Napoleonic regime, this portrait was taken down by order of Napoleon, who had become concerned about the number of people who visited the gallery to see it. Instead of removing it from the gallery, the guards placed it in a dark corner, and visitors paid a small sum of money to see it. Vigée Le Brun was pleased to see it again there after her return from exile, and later still to see it displayed normally after the Bourbon restoration.

Vigée Le Brun's later Marie Antoinette and her Children (1787) was an attempt to improve the Queen's image by making her more relatable to the public, in the hopes of countering the bad press and negative judgments that Marie Antoinette had recently received. The portrait shows the Queen at home in the Palace of Versailles, engaged in her official function as the mother of the King's children, but also suggests Marie Antoinette's uneasy identity as a foreign-born queen whose maternal role was her only true function under Salic law. The child, Louis Joseph, on the right is pointing to an empty cradle, which signified the Queen's recent loss of a child, further emphasizing Marie Antoinette's role as a mother. Vigée Le Brun was initially afraid of displaying this portrait due to the Queen's unpopularity and fear of another negative reaction to it, to such a degree that she locked herself in at home and prayed incessantly for its success. However, she was soon greatly pleased at the positive reception for this group portrait, which was presented to the King by M. de Angevilliers, Louis XVI's minister of arts. Vigée Le Brun herself was also presented to the King, who praised the painting and told her "I know nothing about painting, but I grow to love it through you". The portrait was hung in the halls of Versailles, so that Marie Antoinette passed it on her way to mass, but it was taken down after the Dauphin's death in 1789.

Later on, during the First Empire, she painted a posthumous portrait of the Queen ascending to heaven with two angels, alluding to the two children she had lost, and Louis XVI seated on two clouds. This painting was titled The Apotheosis of the Queen. It was displayed in the chapel of the Infirmerie Marie-Thérèse, rue Denfert-Rochereau, but vanished at some point in the 20th century. She also painted numerous other posthumous portraits of the Queen, and of King Louis XVI.

=== Académie royale de peinture et de sculpture ===
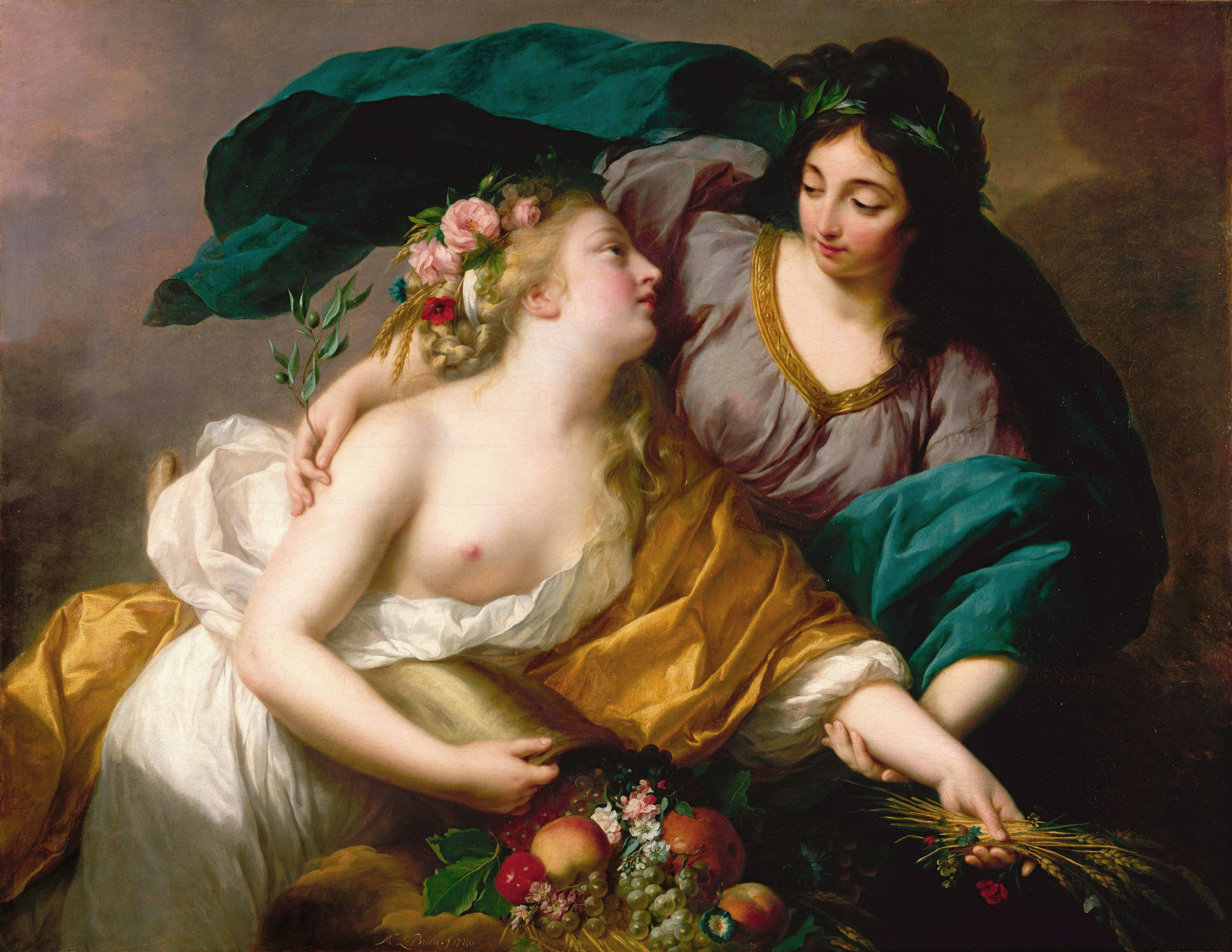
Peace Bringing Back Abundance, Vigée Le Brun's reception piece for the Académie royale, 1783; Louvre

On 31 May 1783, Vigée Le Brun was received as a member of the Académie royale de peinture et de sculpture. She was one of only 15 women to be granted full membership in the Académie between 1648 and 1793. Her rival, Adélaïde Labille-Guiard, was admitted on the same day. Vigée Le Brun was initially refused on the grounds that her husband was an art dealer, but eventually the Académie was overruled by an order from Louis XVI because Marie Antoinette put considerable pressure on the King on behalf of her portraitist. As her reception piece, Vigée Le Brun submitted an allegorical painting, Peace Bringing Back Abundance (La Paix ramenant l'Abondance), instead of a portrait, even though she was not asked for a reception piece. As a consequence, the Académie did not place her work within a standard category of painting — either history or portraiture. Vigée Le Brun's membership in the Académie was dissolved after the French Revolution because the category of female academicians was abolished.

=== Flight from France ===
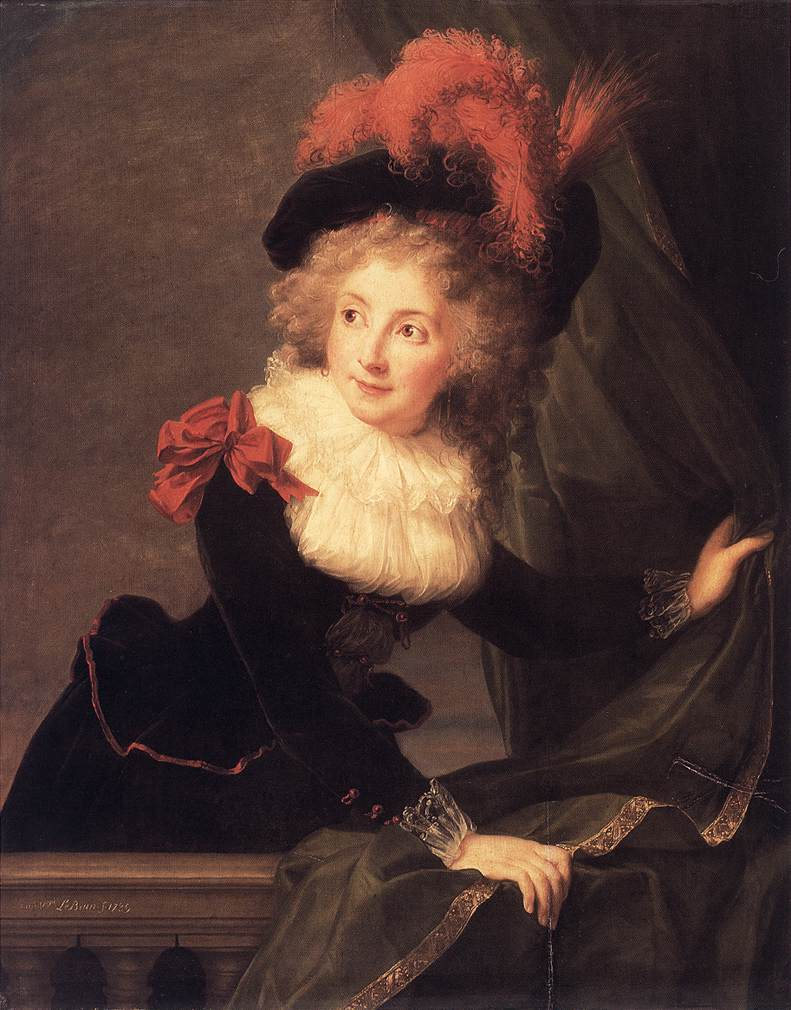
Madame Perregaux, 1789, (née Adélaïde Harenc de Praël), the illegitimate daughter of Nicolas Beaujon, banker to Louis XV, Wallace Collection.

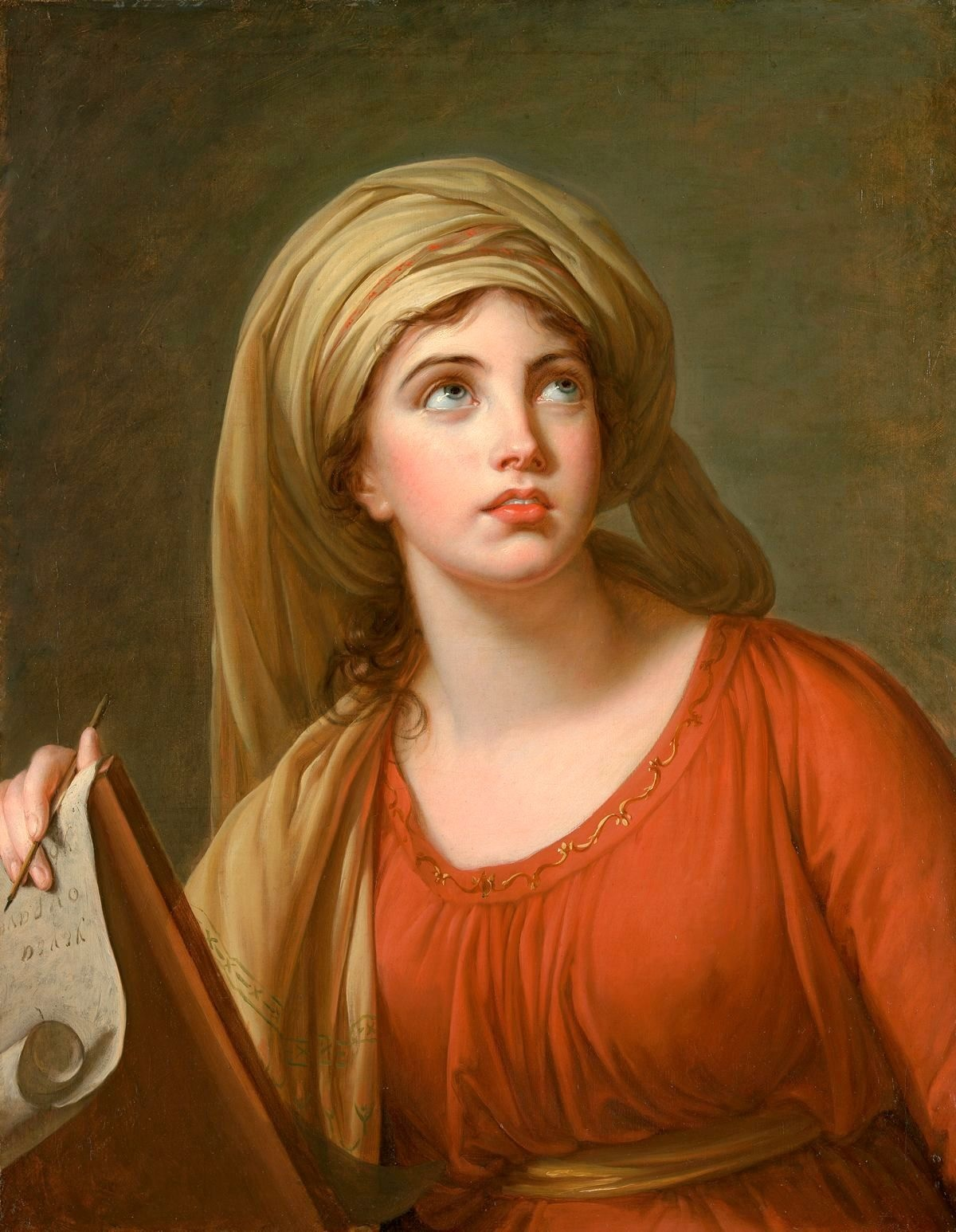
Life Study of Lady Hamilton as the Cumaean Sybil, 1792, Metropolitan Museum of Art. This was widely considered to be one of Vigée Le Brun's greatest works, and was greatly received wherever it was displayed.

Vigée Le Brun witnessed many of the events that accelerated the already rapid deterioration of the Ancien Régime. While travelling to Romainville to visit the Maréchal de Ségur in July 1788, the artist experienced the massive hailstorm that swept the country, and observed the resultant devastation of crops. As the turmoil of the French Revolution grew, the artist's house on the Rue de-Gros-Chenet was harassed by sans-culottes due to her association with Marie Antoinette. Stricken with an intense anxiety, Vigée Le Brun's health deteriorated. M. and Mme. Brongniart pleaded with her to live with them to convalesce and recover her health, to which she agreed and spent several days in their apartment at Les Invalides. Later in her life, in a letter to the Princess Kourakin, the artist wrote:

Society seemed to be in a state of complete chaos, and honest people were left to fend for themselves, for the National Guard was made up of a strange crew, a mixture of bizarre and even frightening types. Everyone seemed to be suffering from fear; I grieved for the pregnant women who passed; the faces of most of them were sallow with worry. I noticed besides that the generation born during the Revolution was, in general, a lot less healthy than the previous one; indeed most of the children born in this sad time were weak and suffering!

As the situation in Paris and France continued to deteriorate with the rising tide of the revolution, the artist decided to leave Paris, and obtained passports for herself, her daughter and their governess. The very next day a large band of national guards entered her house and ordered her not to leave or else face punishment. Two sympathetic national guards from her neighborhood later returned to her house, and advised her to leave the city as fast as possible, but to take the stagecoach instead of her carriage. Vigée Le Brun then ordered three places on the stagecoach out of Paris, but had to wait two weeks to obtain seats as there were many people departing the city. Vigée Le Brun visited her mother before leaving. On 5 October 1789, the King and Queen were driven from Versailles to the Tuilleries by a large crowd of Parisians – mostly women. Vigée Le Brun's stagecoach departed at midnight of the same day, with her brother and husband accompanying them to the Barrière du Trône. She, her daughter and governess dressed shabbily to avoid attracting attention. Vigée Le Brun travelled to Lyon where she stayed for three days with acquaintances (Mme. and M. de Artaut), where she was barely recognized due to her changed features and shabby clothes, and then continued her journey across the Beauvoisin bridge, she was relieved to be finally out of France, although throughout her journey she was accompanied by Jacobin spies who tracked her movement. Her husband, who remained in Paris, claimed that Vigée Le Brun went to Italy "to instruct and improve herself", but she feared for her own safety. In her 12-year absence from France, she lived and worked in Italy (1789–1792), Austria (1792–1795), Russia (1795–1801) and Germany (1801), and remained a committed royalist throughout her life.

==== Italy ====
T‌he artist arrived in Turin after crossing the Savoyard Alps. In Turin, she met the famous engraver Porporati, who was now a professor in the city's academy. Porporati and his daughter received the artist for five or six days until she resumed her journey southwards to Parma, where she met the Comte de Flavigny [fr] (then minister plenipotentiary of Louis XVI) who generously accommodated her during her stay there. While staying in Parma, she sought out churches and galleries that possessed works of the old master Correggio, whose painting T‌he Manger, or Nativity had captivated her when she first saw it in the Louvre. She visited the church of San Giovanni to observe the ceilings and alcoves painting by Correggio, and then the church of San Antonio. She also visited the library of Parma where she found ancient artifacts and sculptures. T‌he Comte de Flavigny then introduced Vigée Le Brun to Marie Antoinette's older sister, the bereaved Infanta and Duchess of Parma, Maria Amalia, while she was in mourning for her recently deceased brother Emperor Joseph II. T‌he artist regarded her as lacking in Marie Antoinette's beauty and grace, and being as pallid as a ghost, and criticized her way of life as being "like that of a man", although she praised the warm welcome the Infanta had given her. Vigée Le Brun did not stay long in Parma, wishing to cross the mountains southwards before the seasons changed. De Flavigny postponed Vigée Le Brun's departure from Parma by two days so that she and her daughter could be escorted by one of his trusted men, the Vicomte de Lespignière, whose carriage accompanied her all the way to Rome.

She first arrived in Modena, where she visited the local Palazzo, and saw several old master paintings by Raphael, Romano and Titian. She also visited the library and the theater there. From Modena, she departed for Bologna. T‌he journey over the mountains was tortuous enough that she walked part of the way, and arrived in Bologna very tired. She wished to stay there at least one week to visit the local galleries and the Bologna arts school, which hosted some of the finest collections of old master paintings, but the innkeeper where she was residing had noticed her unloading her luggage, and informed her that her efforts were in vain, as French citizens were "allowed to reside in that city for only one night". Vigée Le Brun despaired at this news, and was fearful when a man clad in black arrived at the inn whom she recognized as a papal messenger, and assumed he was delivering an order to leave within the next twenty-four hours, She was surprised and elated when she realized that the missive he carried was permission for her to stay in Bologna as long as she pleased. At this juncture, Vigée Le Brun became aware that the Papal government was informed of all French travelers who entered Italy.

She visited the church of Sant'Agnese, of which she wrote:

I went immediately to the church of Sant'Agnese, where this saint's martyrdom is represented in a painting by Domenichino. T‌he youth and innocence of Saint Agnes is so well captured on her beautiful face and the features of the torturer striking her with his sword form such a cruel contrast to her divine nature, that I was overwhelmed with pious admiration. As I knelt before the masterpiece, someone played the overture to Iphigenia on the organ. T‌he involuntary link that I made between the young pagan victim of that story and the young Christian victim, the memory of the peaceful, happy time when I had last listened to that piece of music, and the sad thought of all the evils pressing upon my unhappy country, weighed down my heart to the point where I began to cry bitterly and to pray to God on behalf of France. Fortunately, I was alone in the church and I was able to remain there for some time, giving vent to those painful emotions which took control of my soul.

She then visited several Palazzi, where she viewed some of the finest examples of the Bologna art school. She also visited the Palazzo Caprara, the Palazzo Bonfigliola, and the Palazzo Sampierei, perusing arts and paintings by many old masters. Within three days of her arrival in Bologna, on 3 November 1789, she was received as a member of the academy and the institute of Bologna, with the academy director M. Bequetti personally delivering the letters of admission to her.

Soon after, she crossed the Apennines and arrived in the Tuscan countryside, and from there to Florence. T‌he artist was initially disappointed with its position at the bottom of a wide valley, having preference for elevated views, but was soon charmed by the city's beauty. She lodged herself in a hotel recommended to her.

While in Florence, she visited the famous Medici gallery, where she saw the widely-celebrated and famous Venus de' Medici and the room of the Niobids. She then visited the Pitti palace where she was enamored of several paintings by old masters, including Raphael's Madonna della Sedia, Titian's portrait of Paul III, Rembrandt's Portrait of a Philosopher, Carracci's T‌he Holy Family and many others. She then visited the town's most beautiful landmarks, including the Florence Baptistery, where she saw the Gates of Paradise by Lorenzo Ghiberti, the Church of San Lorenzo, and Michelangelo's mausoleum at the Santa Croce. She also visited the Santissima Annunziata, where she entered the cloister and was enthralled by Andrea del Sarto's Madonna del Sacco, comparing it to Raphael's paintings, but also lamented the state of neglect of the lunettes. She also visited the Palazzo Altoviti, where she saw the self-portrait of Raphael, praising his countenance and expression as that of a "man who was obviously a keen observer of life", but also stated that the painting's protective glass had made its shadows darker. She then visited the Medici library, and later a gallery containing numerous self-portraits by famous artists, where she was asked to present her own self-portrait to the collection, promised to do so as soon as she reached Rome. During her stay in Florence, Vigée Le Brun made the acquaintance of another French lady, the Marquise de Venturi, who took her on excursions along the Arno. She soon left Florence and departed for Rome, arriving there in late November 1789.

As she arrived in Rome, she was surprised by how filthy the famous Tiber was. She headed to the French Academy in the Via del Corso where the director of the academy, M. de Ménageot, went down to receive her. She requested lodging of him, and he quickly furnished her, her daughter and her governess a nearby apartment. He took her to see Saint Peter's on the very same day, where she was underwhelmed by its size; not matching the lavish descriptions she had heard of it, although its vastness became apparent to her upon walking around the structure. She stated to de Ménageot that she would have preferred for it to be supported by columns instead of enormous pillars, to which he replied that it was originally planned as such but it was found not feasible, later showing her some of the original plans for the Basilica.

She visited the Sistine Chapel later on to see Michelangelo's much criticized The Last Judgment, for which she expressed great praise, writing in a letter to the painter Hubert Robert:

I also climbed the steps to the Sistine Chapel, to admire the ceiling with a fresco by Michelangelo as well as his painting of T‌he Last Supper. Despite all the criticisms of this painting, I thought it a masterpiece of the first order for the expression and the boldness of the foreshortened figures. T‌here is a sublime quality in both the composition and in the execution. As for the general air of chaos, I believe it to be totally justified by the subject matter:

On the next day, she visited the Vatican museum; of her visit, she wrote to Robert:

T‌he following day I went to the Vatican Museum. T‌here is really nothing to compare with the classical masterpieces either in shape, style or execution. T‌he Greeks, in particular, created a complete and perfect unison between truth and beauty. Looking at their work, there is no doubt that they possessed exceptional models, or that the men and women of Greece discovered an ideal of beauty long, long ago. As yet I have made only a superficial study of the museum's contents, but the Apollo, the Dying Gladiator, the Laocoon, the magnificent altars, the splendid candelabras, indeed all the beautiful things that I saw have left a permanent impression on my memory:

On the same day, she was summoned by the members of the Academy of Painting, including Anne-Louis Girodet de Roussy-Trioson: they presented her with the palette of the greatly talented deceased painter Jean Germain Drouais, In exchange, they asked her for her own palette, which she obliged. (Note: Vigée Le Brun had been acquainted with the young Drouais back in Paris before he departed for Rome, became David's star pupil and met his untimely death. In her memoirs she praised his skill, writing of him as having exhibited the potential to become the French Raphael before his death.) She later visited the Colosseum, where she saw the cross placed on one of its high points by Robert. While in Rome, she was very keen to seek out the famous female painter Angelica Kauffman, with whom she spent two evenings. Kauffmann showed Vigée Le Brun her gallery and sketches, and they engaged in long conversations. Vigée Le Brun praised her wit and intellect, although Vigée Le Brun found little inspirations in these evenings, citing Kaufmann's lack of enthusiasm and Vigée Le Brun's own dearth of knowledge. For the first three days of her stay in Rome, she visited the home of Cardinal François-Joachim de Pierre de Bernis, who was a gracious host to her.

Vigée Le Brun was very sensitive to sound while sleeping; this was a lifetime burden for her, and when traveling to new locations or cities, frequent moving of lodgings was customary until she found a suitably quiet residence. Due to the racket of coachmen and horses near her apartment in the French Academy and the nightly music of the Calabrians to a nearby Madonna, she searched for other lodgings, which she found in the home of the painter Simon Denis in the Piazza di Spagna, but soon afterwards left this apartment due to the nightly habits of young men and women of singing in the streets at the night. She departed and found a third home, which she carefully scrutinized, then paid one month's worth of rent in advance. On her first night there, she was awoken by a loud noise behind her bed caused by water being pumped through pipes to wash the laundry; a nightly occurrence. She quickly left this home as well to continue her search for quiet lodgings. After a painstaking search, she found a private mansion where she was told she might be able to rent an apartment. She lodged herself there but found it completely unsavory due to the filthiness of its rooms, its poor insulation and a rat infestation in the wooden paneling. Finding herself at her wit's end, she was forced to stay there for six weeks before seeking a new home suitable to her needs. She eventually found a house which seemed perfect, but she refused to pay rent until she had spent a night there; she was immediately woken up by noise caused by a worm infestation in the joists of her room. She left this house as well, later writing: "regretfully I had to abandon the idea of living there. No-one, I am sure, could have changed lodgings as often as I did during my various visits to the capital; I remain convinced that the most difficult thing to find in Rome is a place to live."

Soon after her arrival in Rome, she dispatched the promised self-portrait to Florence. In this portrait, she depicted herself in the act of painting, with the Queen's face on her canvas. She made numerous copies of this portrait later on. (Note: Later versions showing Vigée Le Brun painting her daughter instead of the Queen since she was decreasing the appearance of her royal sympathies in order to be struck from the list of émigrés.) T‌he Rome Academy also requested her self-portrait, which she presented them with. She attended the pope's blessing, delivered by Pope Pius VI during Easter Day in Saint Peter's, while in Rome. Vigée Le Brun found his features stunning, describing them as "not showing any signs of age".

She worked hard during her three-year residency in Rome, painting numerous subjects including Miss Pitt, (Note: T‌his portrait depicted Anne as Hébé offering a cup of water to the eagle. A real eagle was used during the painting process, although it greatly frightened her and Miss Anne.) Lord Bristol, Countess Potocka, Emma, Lady Hamilton, Hyacinthe-Gabrielle Roland and many others. She toured Rome's landmarks extensively, visiting the San Pietro in Vincoli, the San Lorenzo Fuori le Mura, the Archbasilica of Saint John Lateran, and the San Paolo la Fuori le Mura, which she found to be, architecturally, the most beautiful church in Rome. She also visited the Santa Maria della Vittoria, where she saw Bernini's notorious Ecstasy of Saint Teresa, writing of it "...whose scandalous expression defies description".

Apart from her fellow female artist Kaufmann, Vigée Le Brun found company in the Duchesse de Fleury, with whom she became close friends. She also found herself in the social circles of exiled French aristocracy who came to Rome, embedding herself there like most exiled French had done, instead of congregating with Italian aristocracy. She spent many evenings hosted by de Ménageot or the Prince Camille de Rohan, ambassador to Malta., (Note: He was also Grand Commander of the Knights of Malta) who hosted many other exiled French aristocrats. Many of these she attended with her close friend the Duchesse de Fleury, on whom she greatly doted. She soon found one of her oldest friends, M. d'Agincourt, who had lent her art pieces from his gallery to copy when she was very young. She had last met him fourteen years previously in Paris, before he departed from there. She also met the Abbe Maury before he became Cardinal, who informed her that the pope wished her to paint his portrait. She was greatly flattered by the offer, but politely declined; fearing that she would fumble the portrait as she would be forced to wear a veil while painting the pope. Soon afterwards she was taken by de Ménageot, along with the painter Denis, for an excursion to Tivoli. T‌here she visited the Temple of the Sibyl, and then Neptune's Grotto. De Ménageot also took her to see the Villa Aldobrandini, and the ancient ruins of the Roman town of Tusculum, which "evoked many sad thoughts". T‌he entourage continued to Monte Cavo, seeking out the Temple of Jupiter built there. She visited numerous villas, including the Villa Conti, the Villa Palavicina and the ruins of Hadrian's Villa. She also made frequent excursions to the summit of Monte Mario to enjoy the view it offered of the Apennines and visited the Villa Mellini there. In the summer months, she and the Duchesse de Fleury rented an apartment in the home of the painter Carlo Maratta in the Genazzano countryside. She and the Duchess toured the countryside there regularly, visiting Nemi and Albano among others. One of these excursions around Ariccia caused an incident in which she and the Duchess fled for their lives from what they suspected was a rogue following them, of which she wrote: "I have never discovered whether the man who caused our exhaustion was a real villain or the most innocent man in the world".

After a residency of eight months in Rome, the painter planned to follow most of French polite society as it moved to Naples. She informed Cardinal Bernis, who approved of her decision to go, but told her to not travel alone; to that end, he referred her to M. Duvivier, the husband of Mme. Mignot, widow of the painter Denis and Voltaire's niece. She traveled in his spacious carriage to Naples, stopping at an inn in Terracina on the way. As she arrived in Naples she was captivated by the view of the city, the distant plumes of smoke from Mount Vesuvius, the rolling hills of the countryside, and its citizens, writing "...even the people, so lively, so boisterous, so different from the people of Rome, that one would think a thousand leagues lay between the two cities". Her first residency in Naples lasted for six months, although originally planned to be six weeks.

She initially lodged in Chiaia, in the Hotel de Maroc. Her neighbor, the ailing Count Scavronsky, Russian Minister Plenipotentiary to Naples, sent a missive to inquire of her shortly after her arrival, and sent her a lavish dinner. She visited him and his wife, Countess Catherine Skavronskaïa, the same night in their mansion, where she found amiable company with the couple, who invited her again on many evenings. T‌he Count made Vigée Le Brun promise to paint his wife before anyone else in Naples, and she set to painting her portrait two days after her arrival. Soon afterwards, Sir William Hamilton, the English envoy extraordinary to the Kingdom of Naples, visited Vigée Le Brun while the Countess was sitting for her, requesting that the artist paint his mistress, Emma Hart, as her first portrait in the city, it being unknown to him that she had already promised Count Scavronsky that she would paint his wife. She later painted Emma Hart as a bacchante and was captivated by her beauty and long chestnut hair. Sir William also commissioned a portrait of himself, which she completed later. T‌he artist noticed that Sir William had a mercantile inclination towards art, frequently selling paintings and portraits he commissioned for profit. On her future visit to England, she found that he had sold her portrait of him for 300 guineas. She also met Lord Bristol again and painted a second portrait of him. While in Naples, she also painted portraits of the Queen of Naples, Maria Carolina of Austria (sister of Marie Antoinette) and her four eldest living children: Maria Teresa, Francesco, Luisa and Maria Cristina. She later recalled that Luisa "was extremely ugly, and pulled such faces that I was most reluctant to finish her portrait."

She visited the French ambassador to Naples, the Baron de Talleyrand, (Note: Not to be mistaken with the more famous Charles-Maurice de Talleyrand, Napoleon's patron.) and while being hosted by him she met Mme. Silva, a Portuguese woman. Vigée Le Brun then decided to visit the island of Capri to see the palatial Roman ruins there. Her entourage included Mme Silva, the Comte de la Roche-Aymon [fr] and the young son of Baron de Talleyrand. T‌he voyage to the island was turbulent due to rough waters. Soon afterwards, she made multiple trips to the summit of Vesuvius. Her entourage included Mme. Silva and Abbé Bertrand on the first journey, which was hampered by severe rain. On the next day, with clear weather, she climbed the volcano again, with M. de la Chesnaye joining. T‌he party observed the erupting volcano, with plumes of smoke and ash rising from it.

Of her visit to Mount Vesuvius, she wrote in a letter to the architect Alexandre-T‌héodore Brongniart:

We also went up to the mountain refuge. T‌he sun set and we watched its rays disappear behind the islands of Ischia and Procida: what a view! Eventually, night fell, and the smoke turned into flames, the most magnificent I have ever seen in my life. Great jets of fire shot up from the craters in quick succession, throwing red hot rocks noisily on all sides. At the same time a cascade of fire ran down front the summit, covering an area of four to five miles. Another lower mouth of the volcano was also alight; this crater churned out a red and gold smoke, rounding off the frightening but wonderful spectacle. T‌he thunderous noise that seemed to come from deep inside the volcano echoed around us, and the ground shook beneath our feet. I was quite frightened, but tried to hide my fear for the sake of my poor little daughter who was crying, "Maman, should I be afraid?". But there was so much to admire that I soon forgot my fear. Imagine looking down over countless furnaces, whole fields swallowed by the blaze that followed in the wake of the lava. I saw bushes, trees, vines, consumed by this terrible rolling fire; I saw the fire rise up and die out, and I heard it eat its way through the surrounding undergrowth. T‌his powerful scene of destruction is both painful and impressive, and stirs deep feelings within one's soul; I could not speak for a while on my return to Naples; on the road, I kept turning around to see the sparks and that river of fire once more. I was sad to leave such a spectacle; but I have the memory still, and every day I think on different aspects of what I saw. I have four drawings which I shall bring to Paris to show you. Two have already been mounted; we are very happy here.

She returned to the volcano several times, visiting it with the painter Lethière, former director of the French Academy of Painting in Rome. Soon afterwards, she was invited by Sir William to visit the Islands of Ischia and Procida. T‌his voyage included his mistress Emma Hart and her mother. Vigée Le Brun was instantly mesmerized by the island and its inhabitants, writing of its women "I was instantly struck by the beauty of the women we encountered on the road. T‌hey were nearly all tall and statuesque, their costume as well as their build reminding me of the ancient women of Greece".

T‌he party departed from Procida on the same way, bound for Ischia. T‌hey arrived there in the late evening. On the next day, they were taken by General Baron de Salis with a party of twenty to visit the summit of Monte San Nicola. T‌he journey was perilous, and Vigée Le Brun was separated from the party due to dense fog, but soon afterwards found her way to the refuge at the summit of the mountain. After returning to Naples, the artist visited the ancient ruins of Paestum, Herculaneum, Pompeii, and the museum at Portici. Shortly before the new year, she moved to another home due to problems with her previous residence. It was there that she also met the famous composer Giovanni Paisiello and painted his portrait while he was in the process of composition. She frequented Mount Posillipo during her stay in Naples, including the ancient ruins there and Virgil's grave, and it became one of her favorite landmarks.

She returned to Rome afterwards, just in time to find the Queen of Naples arriving from her visit to Austria. T‌he Queen espied the artist in a large crowd, went to her and impressed her to return to Naples to paint her portrait; Le Brun agreed to the prospect. Upon her return to Naples, she was taken by Sir William to the widely popular local festival of Madonna di Piedigrotta, the festival of Madonna dell'Arco. She also visited the Solfatara volcano with M. Amaury Duval and Sacaut. While in Naples, the artist was also fascinated by the local culture of the Lazzaroni.

Upon finishing her portrait of the Queen, she was offered her summerhouse near the coast to entice her to spend more time in Naples, but Le Brun insisted on leaving. Before departing, the Queen gave her a luxurious lacquered box containing her monogram surrounded by fine gems. She returned to Rome once again, undertaking many commissions there, including those of Louis XVI's aunts, mesdames Victoire and Adélaïde. She left Rome on 14 April 1792 for Venice, writing later that she wept bitterly as she left Rome, having grown very attached to that city. She was accompanied by M. Auguste Rivière, occasional diplomat and painter and the brother of Le Brun's sister-in-law. (Note: He was related to her by his sister's marriage to Etienne. Not to be mistaken with the marquis de Rivière, another friend of Vigée Le Brun.) He would be the artist's travelling companion for 9 years, often copying her portraits. Le Brun spent the first night on the road at Civita Castellana, then continued her journey through precipitous and craggy roads, describing the landscape there as gloomy and 'the saddest in the world'. She then arrived in Narni, where she was charmed by the countryside. From there she continued on to Terni where she toured the countryside and hiked up local mountains. She resumed her journey over Monte Somma across the Apennines then to Spoleto. In this town, she witnessed Raphael's partially completed Adoration of the Magi, from which she gained valuable information on his painting techniques, observing that he painted hands and faces first, and experimented frequently with different tints during the early drafting process. While in Spoleto she also visited the Temple of Concord in the mountains, (Note: It appears that she is referring to the 6th-century church known as the Temple of Clitumnus) and the ruins of the ancient town there. She continued to Venice, passing Trevi, Cetri and Foligno. In the latter town she found Raphael's Madonna di Foligno, which gained the complete admiration of Le Brun. She continued to Perugia, passing by Lake Trasimene and hen on to Lise, Combuccia, Arezzo, Levana and Pietre-Fonte, finally arriving in Florence, where she had resided for a short while after her flight from France.

Upon her arrival in Florence, she had a memorable meeting with the Abbé Felice Fontana, then a renowned anatomist. Fontana showed Le Brun his study, filled with wax figures of human organs. T‌he intricacy of the details on some of the replicas had made the artist feel that only divine power could have created the human body. Fontana then showed Le Brun a life-sized figure of a human female, with an exposed cutaway of the intestines. Vigée Le Brun was nearly sick at this sight, and was haunted by it for a long time, later writing to Fontana for advice on relieving herself from the stress and consequences of having seen the internal anatomy of the human body, to which he replied to her; "T‌hat which you describe as a weakness and a misfortune, is in fact the source of your strength and talent; moreover, if you wish to diminish the inconvenience caused by this sensitivity, then stop painting".

After departing Florence she travelled to Siena where she remained for a few days, excursing frequently in its countryside and visiting local churches and galleries. From Siena she left for Parma, where she was welcomed as a member of the Academy of Fine Arts of Parma, and donated a portrait of her daughter. During her stay there, she was visited by a small group of art students from the academy who wished to acquaint themselves with her work:

I was told that there were seven or eight art students downstairs who wished to see me. T‌hey were ushered into the room where I had placed my Sibyl and a few minutes later I went to receive them. Having spoken of their desire to meet me, they continued by saying that they would very much like to see one of my paintings. "Here is one I have recently completed", I replied, pointing to the Sibyl. At first their surprise held them silent: I considered this far more flattering than the most fulsome praise: several then said that they had thought the painting the work of one of the masters of their school: one actually threw himself at my feet, his eyes full of tears. I was even more moved, even more delighted with their admiration since the Sibyl had always been one of my favourite works.

After a few days in Parma, during which she revisited numerous churches and local landmarks & galleries, she finally departed Parma in July 1792, visiting Mantua on her way to Venice. In Mantua she visited the local Cathedral, the ducal palace, the house of Giulio Romano, the Church of Sant'Andrea, the Palazzo del Te and numerous other local landmarks.

She arrived in Venice on the eve of Ascension day. She was surprised by the city's partially submerged aspect, and it was some time before she became accustomed to the modes of transportation in the city's canals. She was received by M. Denon, a fellow artist whom she knew from Paris, who acted as her cicerone, touring the city's landmarks with her. She subsequently witnessed the marriage of Venice and the Sea ceremony. During the celebrations, she met the Prince Augustus of England, and the Princess de Monaco, whom she found to have been pining to return to France to see her children; this was to be her last meeting with the princess, who had been later executed during Reign of Terror.

While in Venice, she visited the churches of Santi Giovanni e Paolo, the Church of Saint Mark and the Piazza San Marco, and the local cemetery. While residing in Venice, she often engaged the company of the Spanish ambassadress, with whom she attended Gaspare Pacchierotti last concert. She soon departed Venice for Milan, stopping at Vicenza, touring its palaces and landmarks, where she was also received lavishly. She then visited Padua, where she visited Church of the Eremitani, praising the church's frescos that were made by Andrea Mantegna, and also visited the Basilica del Santo and the church of Saint John the Baptist. After departing Padua, she visited Verona, where she spent a week, touring the ruins of the Amphitheatre, the San Giorgio in Braida, the Church of Sant'Anastasia and the Church of San Zeno. After spending a week in Verona she left the city, hoping to return to France by way of Turin.

In Turin she referred herself to the Queen of Sardinia, having been given letters of introduction by her aunts, the Mesdames of France whom she had painted in Rome; requesting the artist to paint their niece on her way to France. When she presented this to the bereaved Queen, she politely refused the request, stating that she has given up all worldly matters and had taken up an austere life, which the painter had confirmed from the Queen's disheveled appearance. She also made acquaintance of her husband, the King of Sardinia, while visiting the Queen, finding that had become increasingly reclusive and very thin, and delegated most of his duties to the Queen.

After meeting the Queen of Sardinia, Le Brun visited Madame, the wife of the Comte de Provence, future king Louis XVIII (future queen of France in-exile). She excursed frequently to the countryside with her and her lady in waiting, Marguerite de Gourbillon. She soon met the engraver Porporati again, who recommended her to lodge in a quiet inn in the countryside, she travelled there and was greatly pleased by the quietude and charming views it offered. not long afterwards Vigée Le Brun received news of the storming of the Tuileries of 10 August. Beset with despair, she set back for Turin, where she found the town filled with French refugees as turmoil intensified during the French Revolution, setting a cruel spectacle for the artist. She subsequently rented a small home on the Moncalieri hillside, overlooking the Po river with M. de Rivière, who had arrived recently and narrowly escaped revolutionary violence as it swept the countryside, in solitude. Soon after she was frequently visited there by the Prince Nikolay Yusupov. She soon decided to leave for Milan, but not before repaying the kindness Porporati had extended to her by painting his daughter's portrait, with which he was greatly pleased and made several engravings of the painting, sending several of them to Le Brun.

During her stay in Venice she lost yet another fortune, amounting to 35,000 francs, most of which she had accumulated from her commissions in Italy – which she had deposited in the bank of Venice, when French troops, campaigning under the command of the rising general Napoleon Buonaparte, captured the city shortly after she had left it. Le Brun had been repeatedly warned by M. Sacaut, the embassy secretary, to withdraw her money from the bank, foreseeing that French Republican troops might attack the city. T‌he artist dismissed his warnings as "a republic would never attack another republic"; nevertheless Napoleon later issued an ultimatum to the city to submit, and French troops entered the city. As Venice was looted, General Buonaparte had instructed the banker to spare Le Brun's deposit and afford her an annuity, but the orders were not carried out in the chaotic predicament of the city, and all that reached Vigée Le Brun were two hundred and fifty francs out of an original deposit of 40,000. During her travels in Italy, her name was added to the list of émigrés, losing her French citizenship and having her property scheduled for confiscation. M. Le Brun attempted to have his wife's name struck from the list of émigrés at this juncture by appealing to the Assemblée législative to no avail, and he along with Étienne, Vigée Le Brun's brother, were both briefly incarcerated in 1793, shortly before the terror began. Soon after, M. Le Brun attempted to protect himself and their properties from confiscation and began suing for divorce from his wife. T‌he decree of divorce was issued on 3 June 1793.

Halfway through her journey to Milan, she was detained for two days due to her nationality. She sent a letter to Count Wilsheck, the Austrian ambassador in the town, who secured her release. T‌he count convinced Vigée Le Brun to travel to Vienna, and she decided to go there after her visit to Milan. T‌he artist received a warm welcome in Milan, with many young men and women from noble families serenading her outside her window, which persuaded the artist to extend her stay in Milan by a few days. It was during this time that she visited the Santa Maria delle Grazie and saw Leonardo da Vinci's famous Last Supper. Writing of it:

I visited the refectory of the monastery known as Santa Maria delle Grazie with its famous Last Supper fresco by Leonardo da Vinci. It is one of the great masterpieces of the Italian school: yet in admiring this nobly portrayed Christ and all the other characters painted with such truth and such feeling, I groaned to see the extent to which this superb painting had been defaced: to begin with it had been covered with plaster, and then repainted in several parts. Nevertheless it was possible to judge what this beautiful work had been like prior to these disasters. for the effect, when viewed from a little distance, was still admirable. Since then I have learnt of a completely different cause of its poor condition. I was told that during the wars with Bonaparte in Italy, the soldiers would amuse themselves by firing musket balls at Leonardo's Last Supper! May these Barbarians be cursed!

She also saw various cartoons of Raphael's School of Athens, and various other drawings and sketches by Raphael, Da Vinci and numerous other artists at the Biblioteca Ambrosiana. She visited the Madonna del Monte, enjoying its commanding view, and sketched the countryside frequently.

She later visited Lake Maggiore and resided on one of the two islands in the lake, the Isola Bella, being granted permission by the Prince Borromeo to lodge on the estate there. She soon attempted to visit the other isle, Isola Madre, but stormy weather affected her journey and she returned. It was during this period that she met the Countess Bistri, who would become one of her close friends. She informed the countess of her desire to travel to Vienna, and the countess replied that she and her husband were travelling there soon. Wishing to accompany the artist on her travel, the count and countess brought forward their date of departure to accomplish this. Vigée Le Brun praised the great care they took of her, and she finally left Milan for Austria. Vigée Le Brun would later describe Milan as being very similar to Paris.

While in Italy, Vigée Le Brun was elected to the Academy in Parma (1789) and the Accademia di San Luca in Rome (1790). Vigée Le Brun also painted allegorical portraits of Emma Hamilton as Ariadne (1790) and as a Bacchante (1792). Lady Hamilton was similarly the model for Vigée Le Brun's Sibyl (1792), which was inspired by the painted sibyls of Domenichino. T‌he painting represents the Cumaean Sibyl, as indicated by the Greek inscription on the figure's scroll, which is taken from Virgil's fourth Eclogue. T‌he Sibyl was Vigée Le Brun's favorite work; it is mentioned in her memoir more than any other work. She displayed it while in Venice (1792), Vienna (1792), Dresden (1794) and Saint Petersburg (1795); she also sent it to be shown at the Salon of 1798. It was perhaps her most successful painting and had always garnered the most praise and attracted many viewers wherever it was displayed. Like her reception piece, Peace Bringing Back Abundance, Vigée Le Brun regarded her Sibyl as a history painting, the most elevated category in the Académie's hierarchy.

==== Austria ====
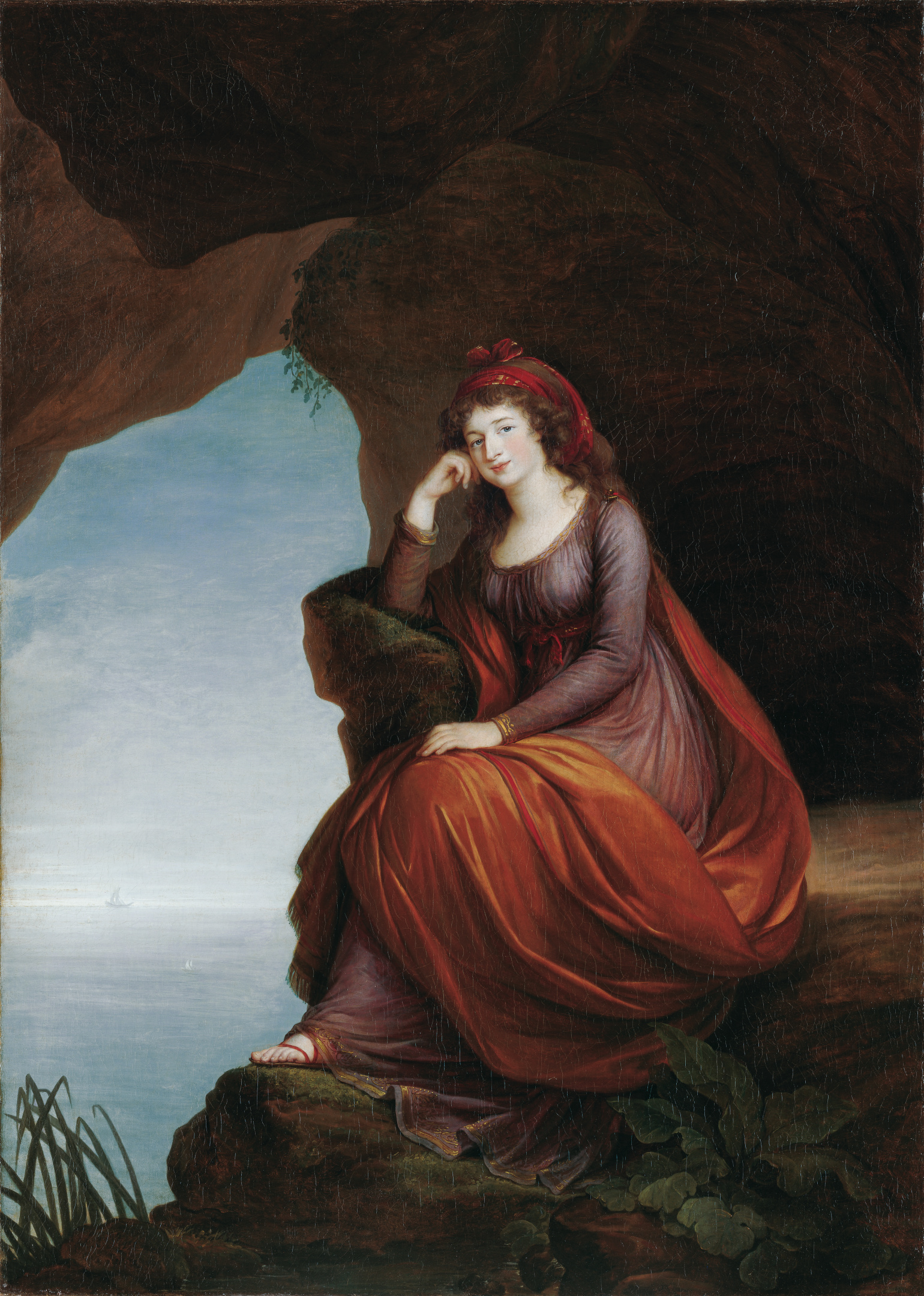
Princess von Esterhazy as Ariadne, 1793, Princely Collections, House of Liechtenstein.

As well as the Countess Bistri and her husband she travelled to Vienna with two other French refugees of poorer origin whom they had taken on. The artist found their company priceless and lodged herself with them in Vienna, with some difficulty in procuring residence due to the travelling party's composition. This would be the beginning of two and a half years of her residency in Austria. Upon lodging herself there, she finished her painting of the countess Bistri, praising her as a "truly beautiful woman", then she presented herself to the Countess Maria Wilhelmine von Thun und Hohenstein, armed with letters of introduction given to her by Count Wilsheck. The artist found a large number of elegant ladies in the countess' salon, and while there, met the Countess Kinska, of whom Vigée Le Brun was completely enraptured with her beauty. Vigée Le Brun proceeded to tour the city's galleries as was her custom when visiting new cities. She first paid a visit to the gallery of the famous painter of battles, Francesco Giuseppe Casanova. She found him in the middle of undertaking several paintings, and found him to be quite active despite being about sixty and "having the habit of wearing two or three spectacles, atop one another", and commented on his "unusual and sharp mind" and his rich imagination when retelling stories or recounting past events during the dinners they had spent with the Prince Kaunitz. Vigée Le Brun praised his composition, though commented that numerous of his works that she witnessed were still not finished.

After meeting Casanova, she presented herself to the aging Prince Kaunitz, at his palace. She found dinners hosted by the prince to be uncomfortable due to the late time in which he dined and the large number of people often present at his table and subsequently decided to dine at home most days. On days when she would accept his invitations, she would dine at home before leaving and ate very little at his table. The prince noticed this and was offended by this and her frequent refusal of his invitations, leading to a short quarrel between the two, but they were soon reconciled. The Prince continued to host the artist and exhibited her Sibyl in his gallery, and she praised the kindness and sweetness he had extended her during her stay. When the Prince died shortly after, Vigée Le Brun was upset by the indifference the city's residents and aristocracy showed, and was further shocked when she visited the wax museum and found the Prince lying in state, his hair and clothes dressed exactly as they had always been. This sight had made a sorrowful impression on her.

Portrait of Countess Maria Theresia Czernin, 1793, Brooklyn Museum.

While in Vienna, Vigée Le Brun was commissioned to paint Princess Maria Josepha Hermengilde Esterházy as Ariadne and Princess Karoline von Liechtenstein as Iris among many others, the latter portrait causing a minor scandal among the Princess's relatives. The portraits depict the Liechtenstein sisters-in-law in unornamented Roman-inspired garments that show the influence of Neoclassicism, and which may have been a reference to the virtuous republican Roman matron Cornelia, mother of the Gracchi. The artist met for the second time in Vienna one of her greatest friends, the Prince de Ligne, whom she had first met in Brussels in 1781. It was at his urging that Vigée Le Brun wished so much to meet the Russian sovereign Catherine the Great and to visit Russia. The Prince de Ligne urged her to stay at his former convent atop Kahlenberg, with its commanding view of the countryside, to which she agreed. During Vigée Le Brun's stay in Kahlenberg, de Ligne wrote a passionate poem about her. After two and half years in Vienna, the artist departed for Saint Petersburg on 19 April 1795, via Prague. She also visited Dresden on her way, and the Königsberg fortress, where she made the acquaintance of Prince Henry of Prussia, who was very hospitable to the artist. While visiting Dresden on her way to Russia, Vigée Le Brun visited the famous Dresden gallery, writing that it was without doubt the most extensive one in all of Europe. It was there that she saw Raphael's Madonna di San Sisto. She was completely enamored of the painting, and wrote:

Suffice to say I came to the conclusion that Raphael is the greatest master of them all. I had just visited several rooms within the gallery when I found myself standing in front of a painting which aroused in me an admiration far more intense than that normally inspired by the art of painting. It showed the Virgin, sitting among the clouds. holding the infant Jesus in her arms. Her face is so beautiful and so noble that it is worthy of the divine brush that painted it. The face of the child, which is charming, bears an expression both innocent and celestial; the robes are accurately drawn and painted in the most magnificent colours. To the right of the Virgin stands a saint who seems quite real; his hands in particular merit admiration. To the left stands a young saint, her head bowed, watching two angels at the base of the painting. Her figure is full of beauty, candour and modesty. The two small angels lean upon their hands, their eyes lifted to the characters above them, and their heads bear an ingenuity and sensitivity that words alone cannot express. Having stood for some time gazing in awe at this painting, I had to pass it yet again on my way out, returning by the same route. The best paintings by the great masters had lost some of their perfection in my eyes, for I carried the image of that wonderful composition and that divine figure of the Virgin about with me! In Art nothing can compete with noble simplicity, and all the faces I viewed subsequently seemed to wear a sort of grimace.

— Élisabeth Vigée Le Brun, Memoirs

==== Russia ====
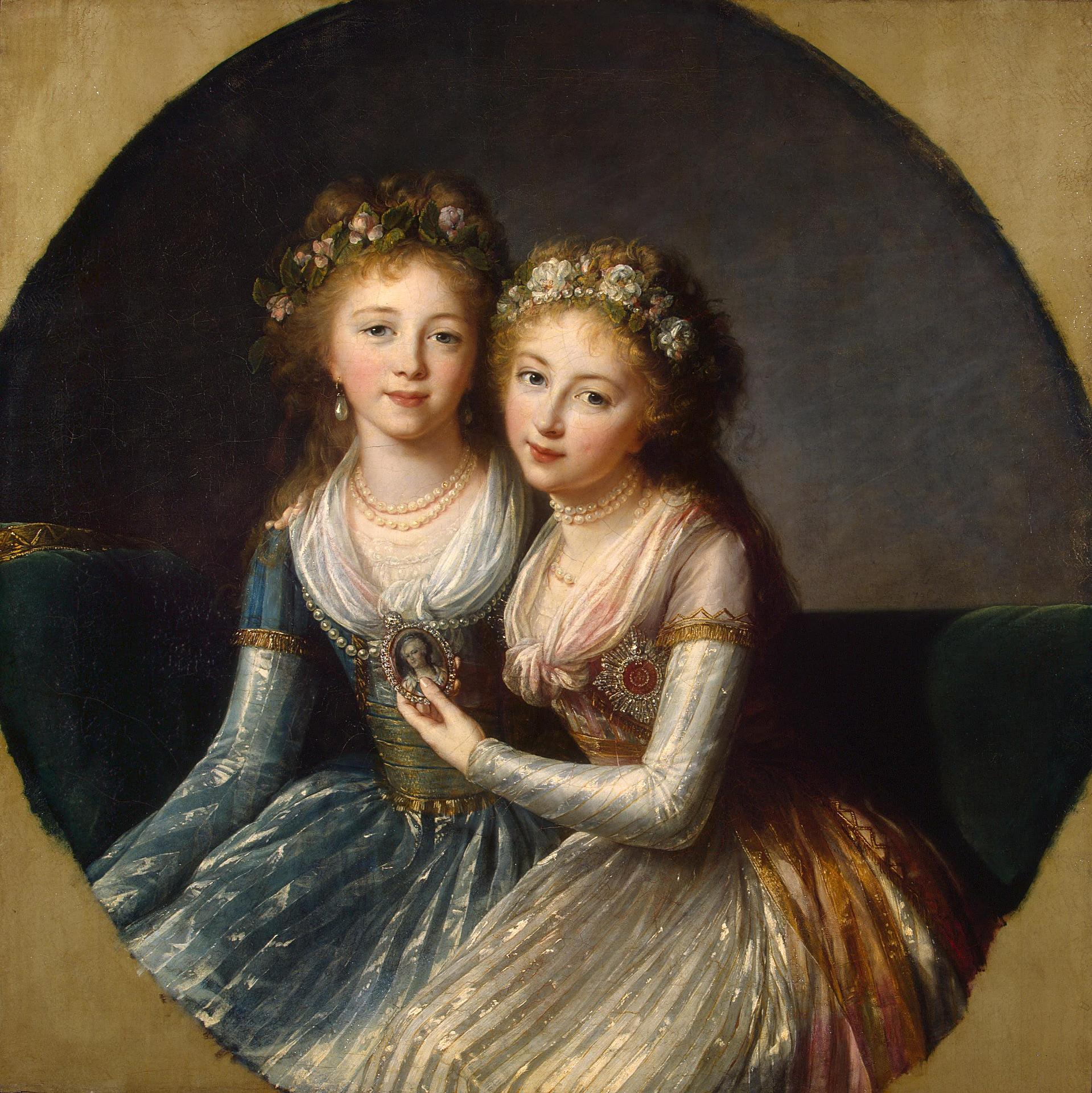
Alexandra and Elena Pavlovna, 1795–1797, Hermitage Museum.

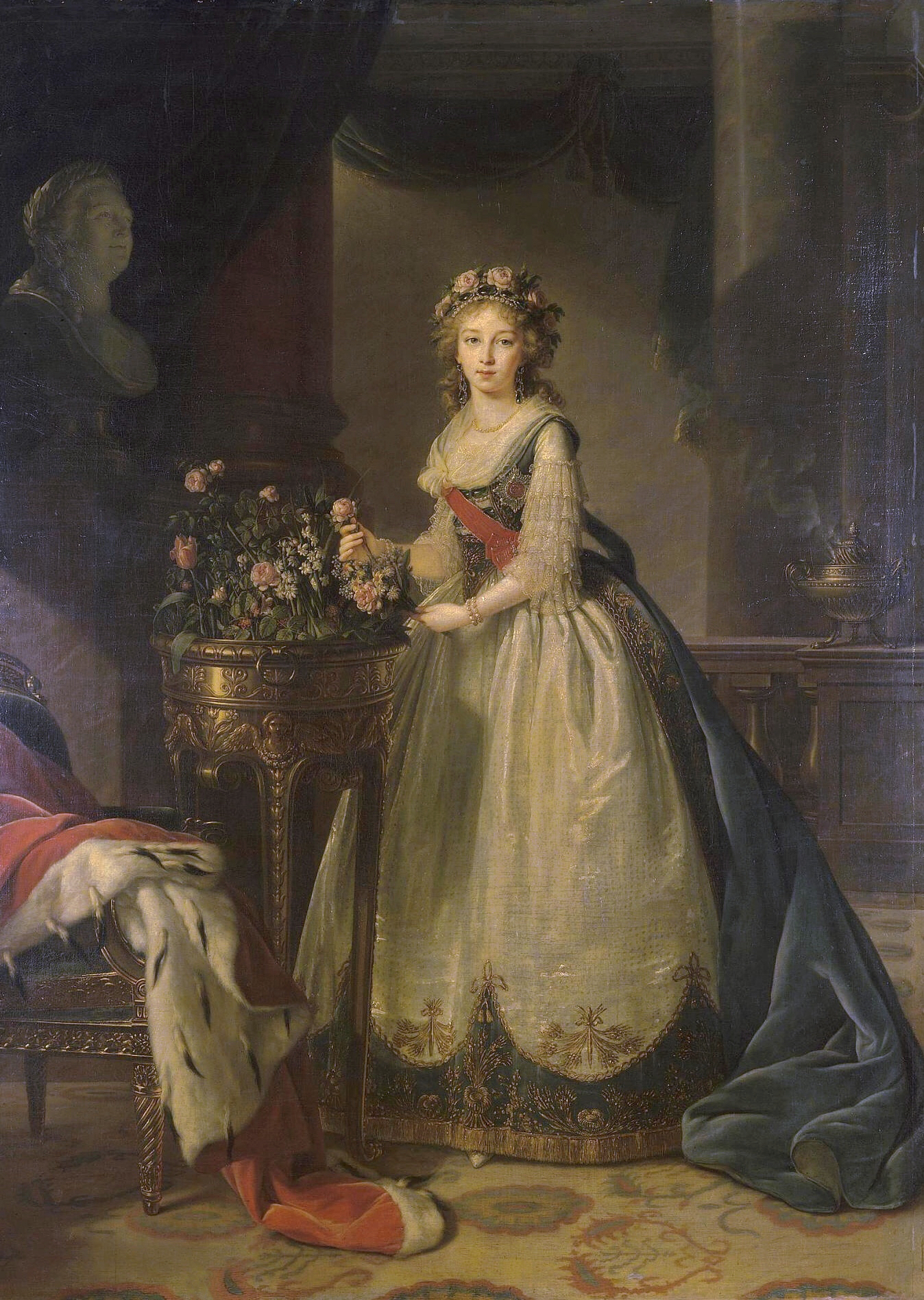
Grand Duchess Elizabeth Alexeievna with Roses, 1795, Hermitage Museum.

In Russia, where she stayed from 1795 until 1801, she was well-received by the nobility and painted numerous aristocrats, including the former King of Poland, Stanisław August Poniatowski, whom she became well acquainted with, and other members of the family of Catherine the Great. Vigée Le Brun painted Catherine's granddaughters (daughters of Paul I of Russia), Elena and Alexandra Pavlovna, in Grecian tunics with exposed arms. The Empress's favorite, Platon Zubov, commented to Vigée Le Brun that the painting had scandalized the Empress due to the amount of bare skin the short sleeves revealed. Vigée Le Brun was greatly worried by this and considered it a hurtful remark and replaced the tunics with the muslin dresses the princesses wore, and added long sleeves (called Amadis in Russia). Vigée Le Brun was later reassured in a conversation with Catherine that she made no such remark, but by then the damage had already been done. When Paul later became Emperor, he expressed having been upset with the alterations Vigée Le Brun made to the painting. When Vigée Le Brun told him what Zubov told her, he shrugged and said "They played a joke on you". Vigée Le Brun painted many other people during her stay in Russia, including the emperor Paul and his consort.

Catherine herself also agreed to sit for Vigée Le Brun, but she died the very next day, which was when she had promised to sit for the artist. While in Russia, Vigée Le Brun was made a member of the Academy of Fine Arts of Saint Petersburg. Much to her dismay, her daughter Julie married Gaétan Bernard Nigris, secretary to the Director of the Imperial Theaters of Saint Petersburg. Vigée Le Brun attempted everything in her power to prevent this match, and viewed it as a scheme concocted by her enemies and her governess to separate her from her daughter. However, as Julie's remonstrations and pressure on her mother grew, Vigée Le Brun relented and gave her approval for the wedding, though she was greatly distressed at the prospect, and soon found her stay in Russia, hitherto so enjoyable, had become suffocating and decided to return to Paris. She wrote:

As for myself, all the charm of my life seemed to have disappeared forever. I could not find the same pleasure in loving my daughter, and yet God knows how much I still love her, despite her faults. Only mothers will understand me when I say this. Shortly after her marriage, she caught smallpox. Although I had never had this dreadful illness, no-one could stop me from running to her bedside. I found her face so swollen that I was seized with fright, but I was only frightened for her sake; as long as the malady lasted, I did not think of myself for one moment. To my joy, she recovered without the least disfigurement. I needed to travel. I needed to leave Saint Petersburg, where I had suffered so much that my health had deteriorated. However, those cruel remarks that had arisen as a result of this affair were soon retracted after the marriage. The men who had offended me the most were sorry indeed at the injustice.

— Souvenirs, Page 213

Before departing for France, Vigée Le Brun decided to visit Moscow. Halfway through her journey to the city, news of the assassination of Paul I reached her. The journey was extremely difficult due to the melting snow, and the carriage often got stuck in the infamous Russian mud; her journey was further delayed when most horses were taken by couriers spreading the news of the death of Paul and the coronation of Alexander. Vigée Le Brun enjoyed her stay in Moscow, and painted many portraits. Upon her return to Saint Petersburg, she met the newly crowned Emperor Alexander I and Empress Louise, who urged her to stay in Saint Petersburg. Upon telling the Emperor of her poor health and prescription by a physician to take the waters near Karlsbad to cure her internal obstruction, the Emperor replied "Do not go there, there is no need to go so far to find a remedy; I shall give you the Empress's horse, a few rides will have you cured". Vigée Le Brun was touched by this, but replied to the Emperor that she did not know how to ride, to which the Emperor said "Well, I will give you a riding instructor, he will teach you". The artist was still adamant about leaving Russia, despite her closest friends, the Count Pavel Alexandrovich Stroganov, M. de Rivière and the princesses Dolgoruky and Kourakina and others attempting all they could to make her stay in Saint Petersburg, she left after residing there for six years. Julie predeceased her mother in 1819, by which time they had reconciled.

In Russia Vigée Le Brun formed several of her longest friendships, with the Princesses Dolgoruky and Kourakin, and the Count Stroganov.

==== Prussia ====
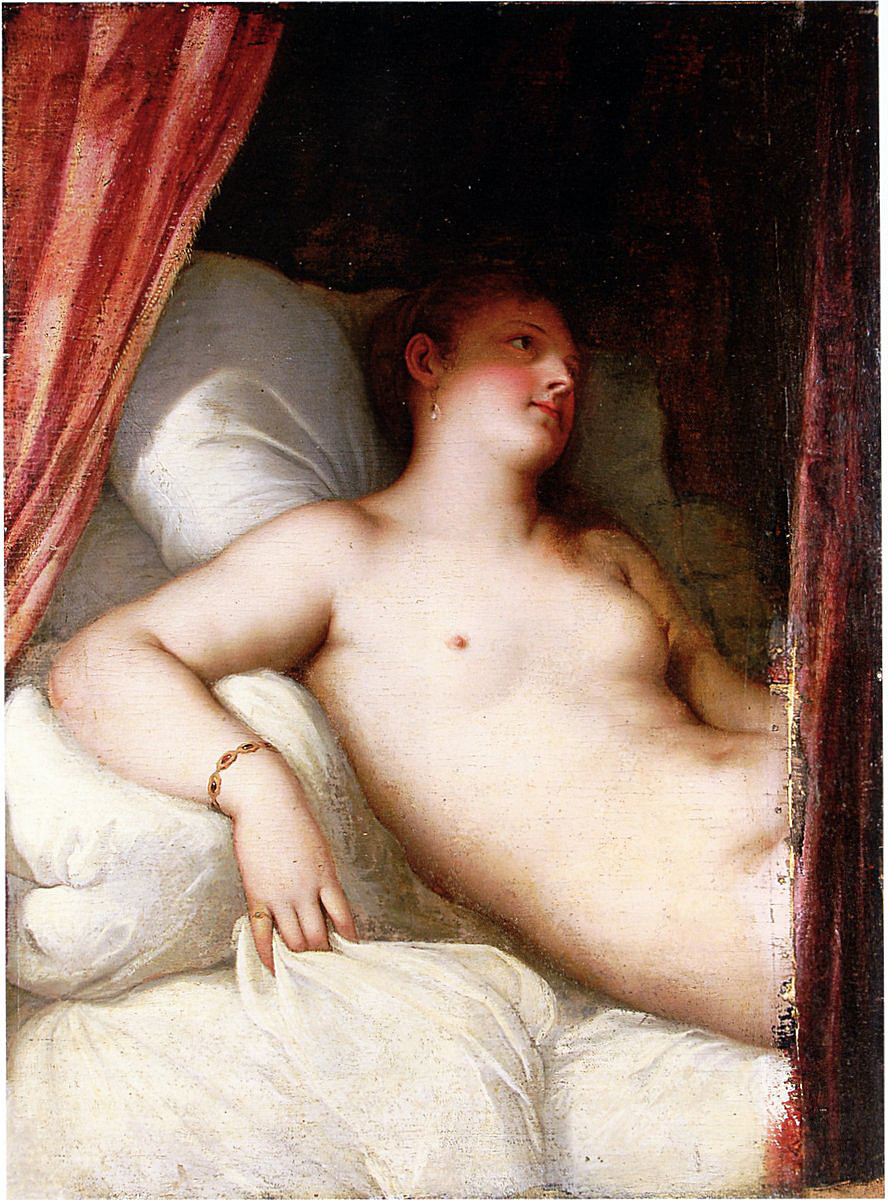
Danaë, after Titian

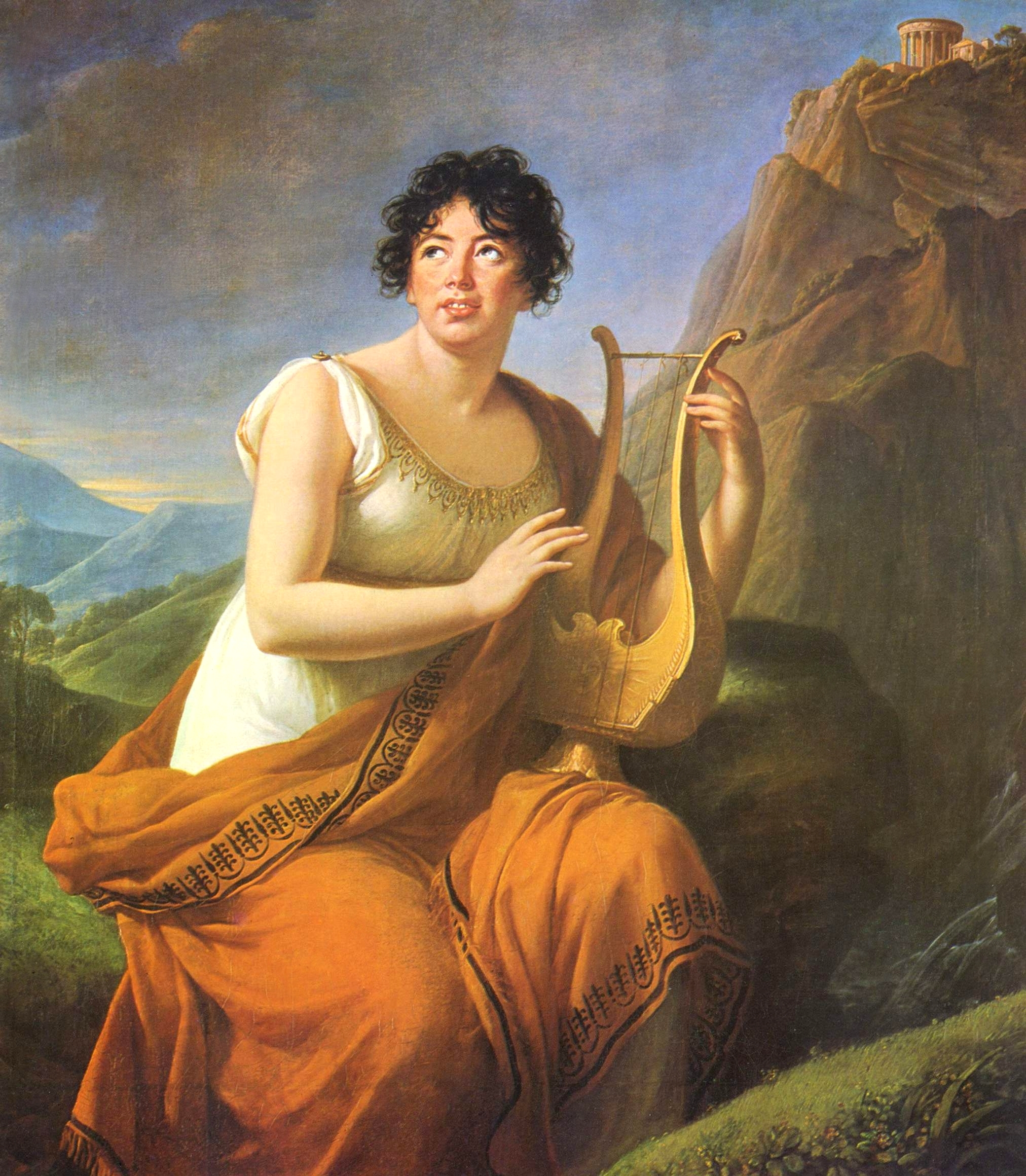
Madame de Staël as Corinne at Cape Miseno, 1807–1809, Musée d'Art et d'Histoire (Geneva).

After her departure from Saint Petersburg, Vigée Le Brun travelled – with some difficulty – through Prussia, visiting Berlin after an exhausting journey. The Queen of Prussia invited Vigée Le Brun to Potsdam to meet her; the Queen then commissioned a portrait of herself. The Queen invited the artist to reside in the Potsdam palace until she finished her portrait, but Vigée Le Brun, not wishing to intrude on the Queen's ladies-in-waiting, chose to reside in a nearby hotel, where her stay was uncomfortable.

The pair soon became friends. During a conversation, Vigée Le Brun complimented the Queen on her bracelets with an antique design, which the Queen then took off and put around Vigée Le Brun's arms. Vigée Le Brun considered this gift one of her most valued possessions for the rest of her life and wore it almost everywhere. At the Queen's urging, Vigée Le Brun visited the Queen's Peacock Island, where the artist enjoyed the countryside.

Aside from two pastel portraits commissioned by the Queen, Vigée Le Brun also painted other pastel portraits of Prince Ferdinand's family.

During her stay in Berlin, she met with the General Plenipotentiary Bournonville, hoping to procure a passport to return to France. The general encouraged Vigée Le Brun to return and assured her that order and safety had been restored. Her brother and husband had already struck her name from the list of émigrés with ease and had her French status restored. Shortly before her departure from Berlin, the General Director of the Academy of Painting visited her, bringing her the diploma for her admission to that academy. After her departure from Berlin, she visited Dresden and painted several copies of Emperor Alexander, which she had promised earlier, and also visited Brunswick where she resided for six days with the Rivière family, and was sought out by the Charles William Ferdinand, Duke of Brunswick who wished to make her acquaintance. She also passed through Weimar and Frankfurt on her way.

==== Return to France and stay at Paris ====
After a sustained campaign by her ex-husband and other family members to have her name removed from the list of counter-revolutionary émigrés, Vigée Le Brun was finally able to return to France in January 1802. The artist received a rapturous welcome in her home at Rue de-Gros-Chenet and was greatly hailed by the press. Three days after her arrival, a letter arrived for her from the Comédie-Française, containing a decree reinstating her as a member of the theater. The leading members of the theater also wished to enact a comedy at her house to celebrate her return, which she politely refused. Soon afterwards, the artist was taken to witness the first consul's routine military ceremony at the Tuileries where she saw Napoleon Bonaparte for the first time, from a window inside the Louvre. The artist found it difficult to recognize the short figure as the man she had heard so much about; as with Catherine the Great, she had imagined a tall figure. A few days later, Bonaparte's brothers visited her gallery to view her works, with Lucien Bonaparte greatly complimenting her famous Sibyl. During her stay, Vigée Le Brun was surprised and dismayed by the greatly changed social customs of Parisian society upon her return there. She soon visited the famous painter Joseph-Marie Vien, who was the former Premier peintre du Roi; then 82 years old and a senator, he gave Vigée Le Brun an enthusiastic welcome and showed her some of his newest sketches. She met her friend from Saint Petersburg, Princess Dolgorouky, and saw her almost daily. In 1802, she demanded the refund of her dowry from her husband, whose gambling habits had dissipated a significant portion of the wealth she had accumulated in her early career as a portraitist. The artist soon felt mentally tormented in Paris, mainly due to memories of the early days of the Revolution, and decided to move to a secluded house in Meudon forest. She was visited there by her neighbors, the famous dissident pair and Directory period Merveilleuses the Duchesse de Fleury, whom she met there for the first time since their friendship in Rome, and Adèle de Bellegarde; time spent with the pair restored her spirits. Shortly thereafter, Vigée Le Brun decided to travel to England, and departed from Paris on 15 April 1802.

==== England ====
Vigée Le Brun arrived at Dover, where she took the stagecoach to London, accompanied by the woman who would become her lifetime friend and chambermaid, Mme Adélaïde, who later married M. Contat, Vigée Le Brun's accountant. Vigée Le Brun was confused by the large crowd at the quays but was reassured that it was common for crowds of curious people to observe disembarking travelers in England. She had been told that highwaymen were common in England, and so hid her diamonds in her stocking. During her ride to London, she was greatly frightened by two riders who approached the stagecoach whom she thought were bandits, but nothing came of it.

Upon her arrival at London, she lodged at the Brunet hotel in Leicester Square. She could not sleep during her first night due to noise from her upstairs neighbor, who she found next morning was none other than the poet François-Auguste Parseval-Grandmaison, whom she had known from Paris. He always paced while reading or reciting his poetry. He promised her to take care not to interrupt her sleep, and she was able to rest well for the next night.

Wishing to find a more permanent lodging, a compatriot named Charmilly directed her to a house in Beck Street, which overlooked the Royal Guards barracks. Vigée Le Brun terminated her residence there because of the noise from the barracks; in her words, "...every morning between three and four o'clock there was a trumpet blast so loud that it could have served for the day of judgement. The noise of the trumpet, together with that of the horses whose stables lay directly beneath my window, prevented me from catching any sleep at all. In the daytime there was a constant din made by the neighbor's children...". Vigée Le Brun then moved to a beautiful house in Portman Square. Upon closely scrutinizing the house's surroundings for any acoustic nuisance, she took up lodging there, only to be awakened at daybreak by a great screeching from a large bird owned by her neighbor. Later on, she also discovered that the former residents had buried two of their slaves in the cellar, where their bodies remained, and once again she decided to move, this time to a very damp building in Maddox Street. Although this was far from perfect, the artist was exhausted from constant moving, and decided to remain there, though the dampness of the house, combined with London's humid weather – greatly disliked by the artist – hindered her painting process. Vigée Le Brun found London lacking in inspiration for an artist due to its lack of public galleries at that time. She visited monuments, including Westminster Abbey, where she was greatly affected by the tomb of Mary, Queen of Scots, and visited the sarcophagi of the poets William Shakespeare, Thomas Chatterton and Alexander Pope. She also visited St Paul's Cathedral, the Tower of London and the London Museum. She greatly disliked the austere social customs of the English, particularly how quiet and empty the city was on Sundays, when all shops were closed and no social gatherings took place; the only pastime was the city's long walks. The artist also did not enjoy the local soiree equivalent – known as Routs (or rout-parties), describing them as stuffy and dour. The artist sought out the tree under which the famous poet John Milton was said to have composed Paradise Lost, but was surprised to find that it had been cut down.

The artist visited the galleries of several prominent artists while in London, starting with the studio of artist Benjamin West. She also viewed some works by Joshua Reynolds. Vigée Le Brun was surprised to find that it was customary in England for visitors to the studios of artists to pay a small fee to the artist. Vigée Le Brun did not adhere to this local custom, and allowed her servant to pocket this toll. She was greatly pleased to meet one of the most famous actress and tragediennes of her era, Sarah Siddons, who visited Vigée Le Brun's studio in Maddox Street. During her stay in London, the English portraitist John Hoppner published a speech that viciously criticized her, her art and French artists in general, to which she made a scathing reply by letter which she published later in her life as part of her memoirs.

Vigée Le Brun continued to hold soirées and receptions in her house, which although damp, was beautiful. She received many people, including the Prince of Wales George IV, Lady Hertford and Lord Borington and the famous actress Giuseppina Grassini among others. Vigée Le Brun sought out other compatriots during her stay in England, and cultivated a social circle of émigrés that included the Comte d'Artois (future King Charles X) and his son Charles Ferdinand, Duke of Berry, the Duc de Serant and the Duc de Rivière.

Shortly after her arrival in London, the Treaty of Amiens was abrogated, and hostilities between France and the United Kingdom resumed. The British Government ordered all French people who had not resided more than a year in the UK to depart immediately. The Prince of Wales reassured Vigée Le Brun that this would not affect her, and she might reside in England however long she pleased. This permit from the King was difficult to procure, but the Prince of Wales personally delivered the permit to Vigée Le Brun.

Vigée Le Brun toured the countryside during her stay in England. She started with a visit to Margaret Chinnery at Gilwell Hall, where she received a "charming welcome" and met the famous musician Giovanni Battista Viotti, who composed a song for her which was sung by Mrs. Chinnery's daughter. She painted Mrs. Chinnery and her children while there, departing for Windsor after staying at Gilwell for a fortnight. She also visited Windsor Park and Hampton Court on the outskirts of London before leaving to visit Bath, where she greatly enjoyed the picturesque architecture of the city, its rolling hills and the countryside; but much like London, she found its society and weather dreary. She found some of her Russian friends from Saint Petersburg there, and went to visit the astronomer siblings William Herschel and Caroline Herschel. William Herschel showed Vigée Le Brun detailed maps of the moon, among other things.

The artist greatly enjoyed the English countryside, describing Matlock as being as picturesque as the Swiss countryside. Vigée Le Brun also visited the Duchess of Dorset at Knole House in Kent, which had once been owned by Elizabeth I. She returned to London, where she found Joseph Hyacinthe François de Paule de Rigaud, Comte de Vaudreuil, and then went to Twickenham where she visited Mme la Comtesse de Vaudreuil and Antoine Philippe, Duke of Montpensier, with whom Vigée Le Brun became well acquainted; they enjoyed painting the countryside together. She was subsequently received by the Duc d'Orléans (the future King Louis Philippe I). She then visited the Margravine of Brandenburg-Ansbach, the Baroness Craven, whom she painted and came to greatly enjoy her company, spending three weeks at her estate. Together, they visited the Isle of Wight, where Vigée Le Brun was mesmerized by the beauty of the countryside and the amiability of its inhabitants, writing later that along with the Isle of Ischia (near Naples), these were the only two places where she would happily spend her entire life.

She visited Mary Elizabeth Grenville, Marchioness of Buckingham, at Stowe. She also went to the home of Lord Moira and his sister Charlotte Adelaide Constantia Rawdon, where Vigée Le Brun further experienced the stern social milieu of English aristocracy; she spent some of the winter there. She then departed for Warwick Castle, eager to see this after hearing it praised so much. Vigée Le Brun attempted to visit the area incognito to avoid any awkwardness with Lord Warwick, as he would receive foreigners only if he knew their name. When he became aware that Vigée Le Brun was visiting, he went to her in person and gave her a decorous reception. After introducing the artist to his wife, he took her on a tour around the castle, looking over the lavish art collection there. He presented her with two drawings which she had sketched in Sir William Hamilton's summerhouse during her stay in Italy, telling her that he had paid a high price to buy them from his nephew. Vigée Le Brun later wrote that she had never sold them to Sir William to begin with. He also presented to her the famous Warwick vase, which he had purchased from Sir William as well. Vigée Le Brun then ended her tour by visiting Blenheim Palace before returning to London, and preparing to depart for France after staying in England for nearly three years. Upon her imminent departure becoming known, many of her acquaintances attempted to extend her residence with them, but to no avail as Vigée Le Brun wanted to see her daughter, who was in Paris at the time. As she prepared to leave London, Mme Grassini arrived and then accompanied her, staying with her until her ship departed for Rotterdam, ending a trip that was originally intended to last only five months.

==== Return to France from England ====
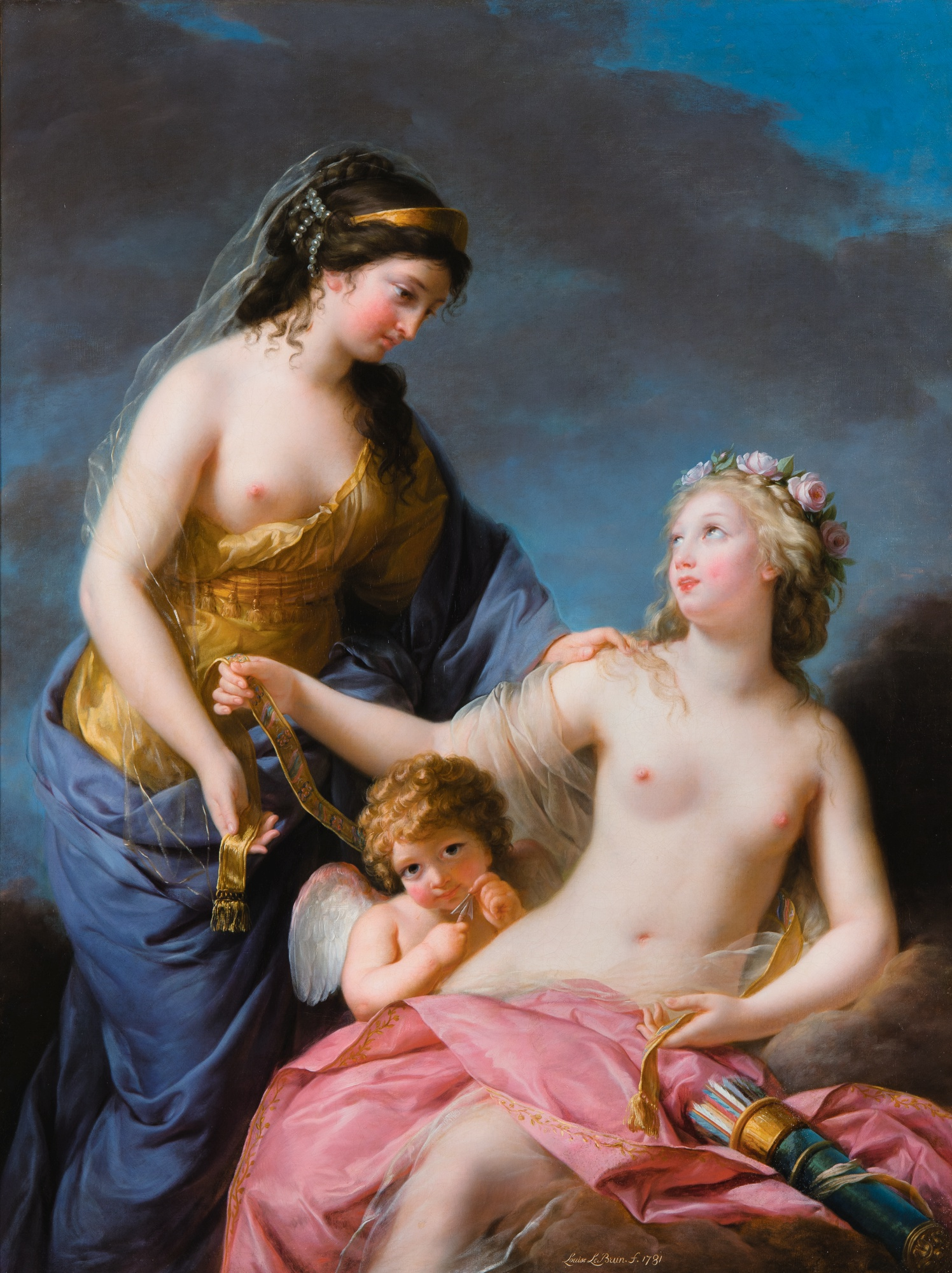
Juno Borrowing the Belt of Venus, 1781; private collection.

Her ship arrived in Rotterdam, where she first visited François de Beauharnais, the prefect of Rotterdam and brother in law to the Empress Joséphine de Beauharnais (brother to the late Alexandre de Beauharnais, who had been executed during The Terror). The artist was ordered to reside for eight to ten days in Rotterdam, as she has arrived from hostile soil, and was ordered to appear before the General Charles Oudinot, who was hospitable to her. After residing in Rotterdam for ten days, she received her passport and started for Paris. She visited Antwerp on her way to Paris and was received by its prefect, the Comte d'Hédouville [fr], and toured the city with him and his wife, and visited a sick young painter who wished to make her acquaintance.

She arrived in Paris and rejoiced to find her brother and her husband there, who was charged with recruiting artists for Saint Petersburg. He departed a few months later for Saint Petersburg, but Julie remained due to their failing union, though her relationship with her daughter continued to be a torment to her. She made the acquaintance of one of the most famous singers of her time, Angelica Catalani. She painted her and kept her portrait along with that of Mme Grassini for the rest of her life, and continued to host soirées in her home as she had always had, to which Mme. Catalani was a regular.

Shortly after her arrival in Paris, Vigée Le Brun was commissioned by the court painter, Vivant Denon, to paint a portrait of the Emperor's sister Caroline Bonaparte, though she had heard that her journey to England had displeased Napoleon, who had allegedly said "Madame Le Brun has gone to England to see her friends". Vigée Le Brun accepted the commission despite the fact that she was paid 1800 Francs, less than half the customary asking price, and later also included Mme Murat's daughter in the portrait without raising the fee. She later described this commission as "torture", and wrote in her memoirs:

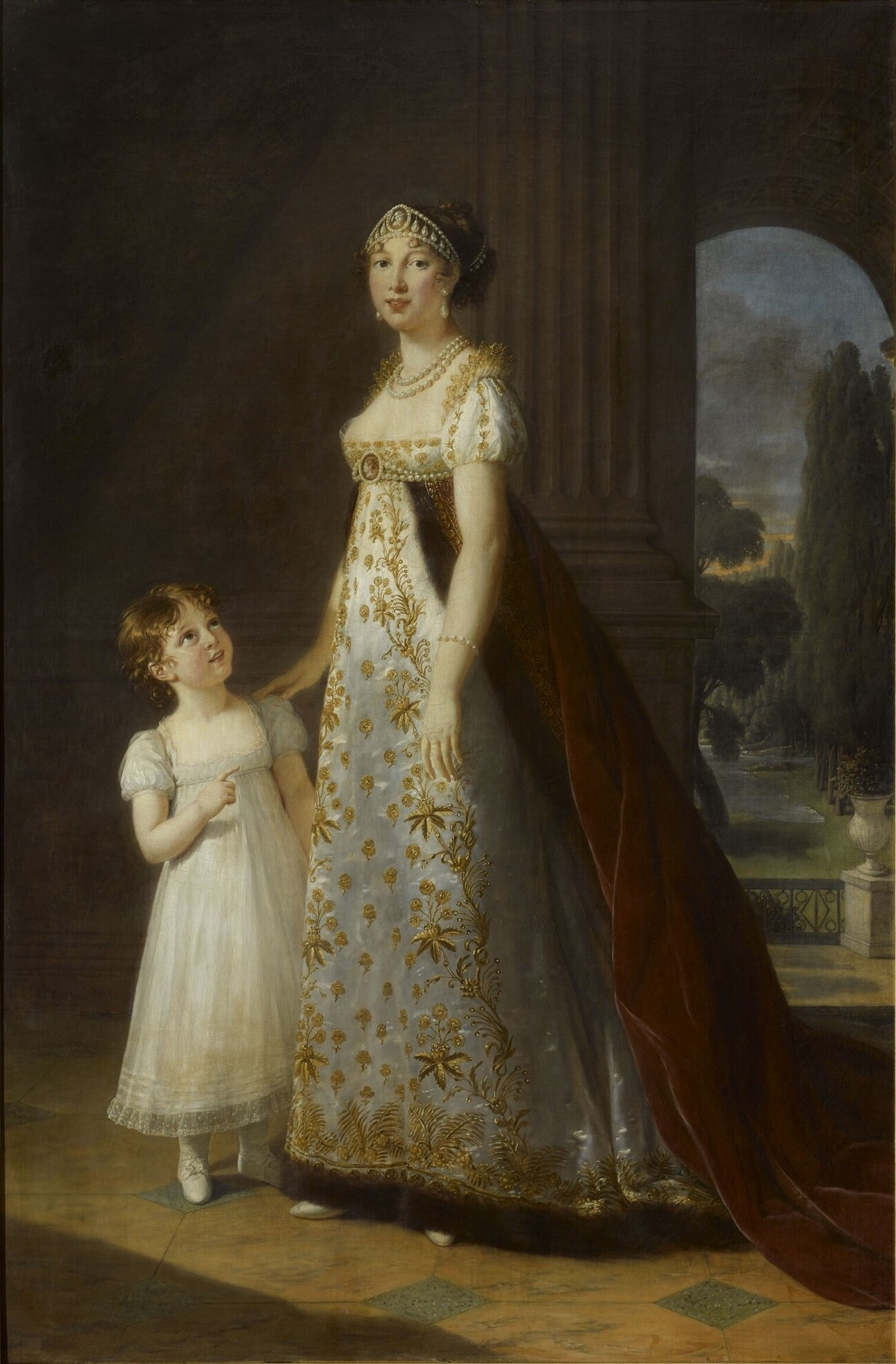
The portrait of Mme Murat

It would be impossible to describe all the vexations and torment I had to suffer while painting this portrait. First of all Mme Murat arrived with two ladies in waiting who proceeded to dress her hair as I tried to paint her. When I observed that it would be impossible to capture a likeness if I allowed them to continue, she eventually agreed to send the two women away. Added to this inconvenience, she almost always broke our appointments, which meant my staying in Paris for the whole summer waiting, usually in vain, for her to appear, for I was eager to finish the painting; I cannot tell you how this woman tried my patience. Moreover the gap between sittings was so long, that each time she did appear, her hair was dressed differently. At the beginning, for example, she had curls falling onto her cheek and I painted them accordingly; but a little later this style had gone out of fashion and she returned with a completely different one; I then had to rub out the curls as well as the pearls on her bandeau and replace them with cameos. The same thing happened with the dresses. The first dress I painted was rather open, as was the fashion then, and had a great deal of bold embroidery; when the fashion changed and the embroidery became more delicate, I had to enlarge the dress in order not to lose the detail. Eventually all these irritations reached a pitch, and I became very bad tempered as a result; one day she happened to be in my studio and I said to M. Denon, in a voice loud enough for her to overhear: 'When I painted real princesses they never gave me any trouble and never kept me waiting.' Of course Mme Murat did not know that punctuality is the politeness of kings, as Louis XIV quite rightly remarked and he, at least, was no upstart.

The portrait was exhibited in the Salon of 1807, and was the only portrait the imperial government commissioned from her.

==== Switzerland in 1807 ====
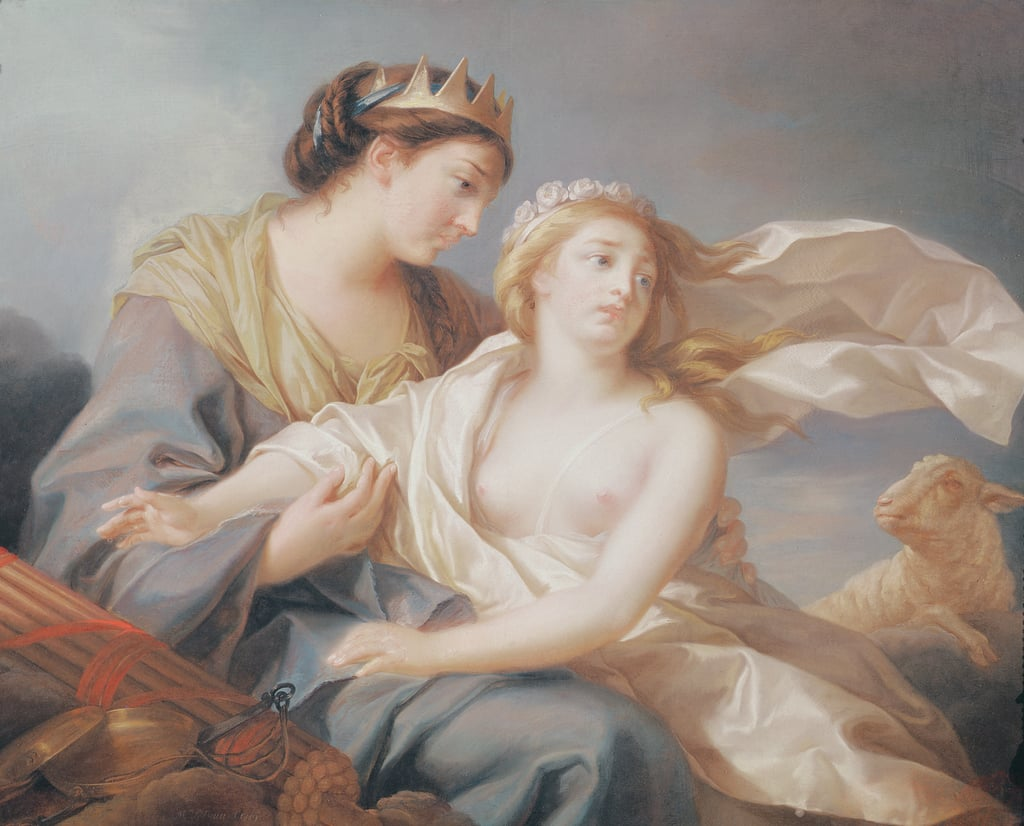
Innocence takes refuge in the arms of Justice, 1779, Musée des Beaux-Arts d'Angers, exhibited in 1783 at the Salon de la Correspondance

In July 1807, the artist crossed to Switzerland, arriving first at the town of Basel, where she was received by Christoph Ehinger, a local banker, who threw a banquet to welcome the artist. She proceeded to Biel on the advice of Ehinger, but the roads there were so hazardous that part of the journey had to be made on foot. After recuperating in Biel for a single day, she proceeded to the tiny Île Saint-Pierre to visit the home of Jean-Jacques Rousseau, which she found, to her great surprise and dismay, had become a tavern. Vigée Le Brun praised the picturesque countryside repeatedly in her letters to Countess Vincent Potocka. After departing the island to return to Biel, she went on to Bern, where she was received by the wife of the Landamann (magistrate), Mme de Watteville, and the General Ambassador Honoré Vial. She also met the seven-months pregnant Mme de Brac, who accompanied her to Thun, and then to the Lauterbrunnen Valley, which she found dark and grim due to its being hidden from sunlight on both sides by steep mountains. On her descent, she and her company encountered a group of local shepherdesses; the beauty and naivete of the local people and the wilderness where the encounter took place made her liken the experience to something out of Arabian Nights. She went on to visit the Staubbach Falls in the valley.

After traversing the rugged trails of the valley, she returned to Bern via Brientz, and then arrived at Schaffhausen where she was received by the local Burgomeister, who took her to see the Rhine Falls. After departing from Schaffhausen, she visited the city of Zürich, where she enjoyed the hospitality of General Baron de Salis.

After taking the young daughter-in-law of de Salis with her, she departed for the small island of Ufenau in Lake Zurich, then visited Rappercheld [sic] where she continued to be mesmerized by the beauty of the countryside and the "native innocence" of the locals. After a hazardous boat ride destined for Walenstadt, the entourage turned back to Rappercheld and then visited the valley of Glarus. The artist then continued to the village of Soleure, on the Jura mountains. Seeing a solitary chalet perched atop Mount Wunchenstein [sic], her curiosity was excited by who would live so far and high, and she made a trek up the mountain after being assured that the conditions of the road would support her carriage. After slightly less than an hour, the road became very rugged and far too steep, prompting her to dismount and continue the journey on foot. The trek lasted about five and a half hours, though she wrote in a letter to Countess Potocka that the view made it completely worth it:

to tell the truth, the view completely eliminated my fatigue. Five or six vast forests, piled one upon the other, fell away beneath my eyes; the canton of Soleure seemed no more than a plain, the town and the villages, tiny specks; the fine line of glaciers which fringed the horizon became redder and redder as the sun sank: the other mountains between them formed a complete color spectrum; gold rays stretched across the mountain to my left, each carrying a rainbow in its arc; the sun set behind the peak; red-violet mountains grew imperceptibly fainter and fainter in the distance, stretching away to the lake of Biel and the far edge of Lake Neuchatel, they stood so far apart that you could only distinguish them by two gold lines. heavy with translucent mist; I was still overlooking the deep ravines and mountains covered with thick foliage; at my feet lay wild valleys surrounded by black pine forests. As the sun set, I watched the shadows change; different points took on a more sinister character, partly because of their shape and partly because of that long silence which slips harmoniously into the day's demise. All I can tell you is that my soul gloried in such a solemn and melancholy vision.

She returned to Soleure the next day, and then departed for Vevey, which she described as "the land of my dreams". She rented a house on the banks of Lake Geneva and toured the countryside and mountains around Vevey. She walked up Mount Blonay where the Messieurs de Blonay hosted her at Blonay castle. After descending the mountain, the artist hired the innkeeper where she was lodged to row her out on the lake at night. She was enthralled by the charming beauty and silence of the lake, and wrote of the journey later "He was not Saint Preux and I was not Julie, but I was no less happy".

Vigée Le Brun then departed for Coppet, where she met the famous dissident socialite and woman of letters Madame de Staël, who was exiled by the Napoleonic regime. She stayed at Coppet with Madame de Staël, whom she painted as Corinne, a character from Mme de Staël's most recent novel, Corinne ou l'Italie (1807).

After returning from Coppet to Geneva, where she was made an honorary member of the Société pour l'Avancement des Beaux-Arts, she departed in a group with the de Brac family for Chamonix, intending to visit the Sallanches mountains, the Aiguille du Goûter, and Mont Blanc. The journey was perilous. The entourage visited the Bossons Glacier. On the way upwards, M. de Brac fell ill with catalepsy, and was slowly nursed back to health in a nearby inn, where Vigée Le Brun, the pregnant Mme de Brac and her son were distraught and worried about his condition, but he recuperated slowly over the course of a week. After eleven days in Chamonix, the artist departed alone without the de Brac family, writing that nothing would bring her to visit the "melancholic"' Chamonix again. She then left Switzerland and returned to Paris.

==== Switzerland in 1808 ====
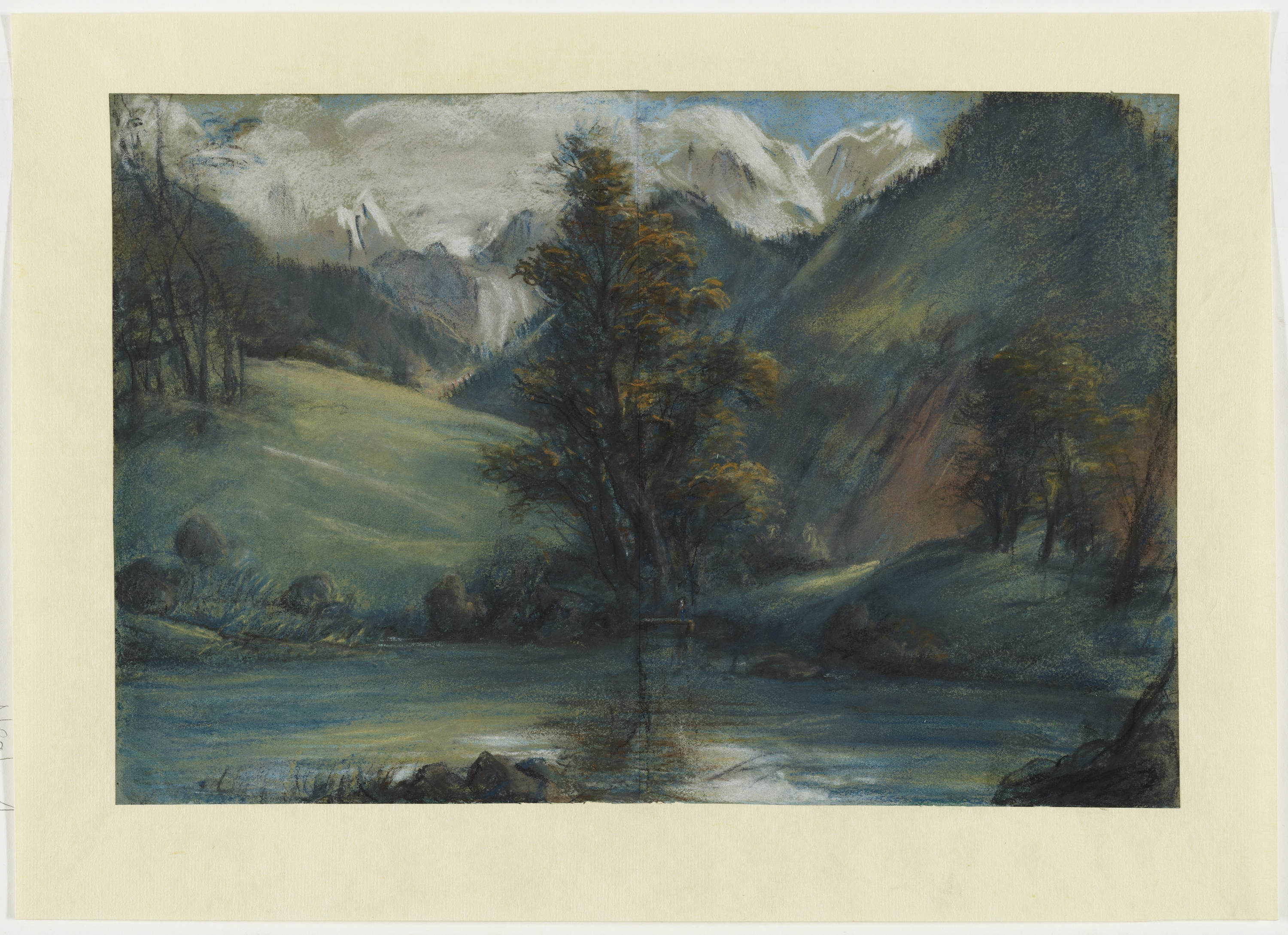
Lake of Challes and Mont Blanc, painted during her travels to Switzerland, Minneapolis institute of Art.

With her desire for travel still not sated, Vigée Le Brun re-entered Switzerland in 1808 via Neuchâtel, and then visited Lucerne, where she was enchanted by the picturesque and wild town. The artist also visited Brown [sic] and the market town of Schwyz, then Zug, where she crossed Lake Zug. She visited an inn where she wanted to visit the infamous landslide of Goldau. The artist visited the valley, once populated with several villages, now buried under rocks. Heavy with sorrow, she contemplated the remains of the villages for a long time before departing for Arth. Vigée Le Brun then climbed Küssnacht, intending to visit the spot where the legendary William Tell was said to have killed Albrecht Gessler; at the time a chapel had been constructed on the location. There, the artist observed a shepherd and shepherdess singing to each other across the valley, a local courting custom, although the two stopped singing when they noticed her. The "communication of love through melody" presented her with a delightful scene, which she would describe as an eclogue in action.

The artist then visited Unterseen, where she was fortunate to arrive in time to witness the Shepherd's festival at Unspunnen castle, which took place once every century. She was hosted by M. and Mme Konig, who hosted all notable people who came to visit the festivals. Vigée Le Brun went to the château du Bailli to witness the start of the festival, which had been postponed a few days due to incessant rain, and was captivated by the festival's solemn pastoral chants and fireworks at night. The next day, she returned to see the festival taking place at half past ten in the morning; she joined the celebrations and dancing, before sitting back and watching the contests between the shepherds and shepherdesses. Vigée Le Brun recorded that she was frequently moved to tears by the enchanting atmosphere of the festival.

Coincidentally, she found Madame de Staël at the festival, and joined her in the procession that followed the Bailli and his magistrates, which was joined by people from the neighboring valleys, dressed in their local costume and carrying flags representing each canton or valley.

=== Return to Paris and later life ===
==== New home at Louveciennes, the abdications of Napoleon and Bourbon restorations ====
After returning to Paris from her second visit to Switzerland, Vigée Le Brun purchased a house in Louveciennes, Île-de-France near the Seine, and invited her niece (daughter of her brother Étienne) Caroline Rivière and her husband to live with her. She doted on the newlywed couple and formed a close bond with them, and occasionally visited Paris. She had Mme. Pourat and the talented actress Comtesse de Hocquart as neighbors. She visited Madame du Barry's home, the Pavillon de Louveciennes, which she found had been looted and stripped clean of its furniture and contents. On 31 March 1814, her house was raided by Prussian troops who were advancing towards Paris in the final stages of the war of the Sixth Coalition. As she prepared to go to bed after eleven o'clock, with no knowledge of the proximity of the allied troops, they entered her home, while she lay in her bed. They entered her bedchamber and proceeded to loot her home. Her German-speaking Swiss servant Joseph screamed at the soldiers to spare her person until his voice was hoarse. After the looting, the soldiers left her home. She left as well, initially intending to head to Saint-Germain-des-Prés before learning that the road there was unsafe. Instead she decided to take refuge in a room above the pumping machine at Marly aqueduct, near Du Barry's pavilion, with many other people, having entrusted her house to Joseph. As fighting nearby intensified, Vigée Le Brun attempted to take refuge in cave, but gave up after injuring her leg. There, she observed how most of the merchants taking refuge were, like her, pining for the restoration of the Bourbons.

She departed for Paris as soon as she received the news, and communicated by letter with Joseph about the condition of her Louveciennes home, which had been ransacked and its garden destroyed by the Prussian troops. Her servant wrote to her: "I beg them to be less greedy, to content themselves with whatever I give them, they reply: "The French have done far worse things in our country". Vigée Le Brun wrote in her memoirs "The Prussians are right; poor Joseph and I had to answer for that."

Vigée Le Brun was exultant at the entry of the Comte d'Artois to Paris on 12 April, shortly after Napoleon had agreed to abdicate. She wrote to him about the King, to which he replied: "His legs are still bad, but his mind is in excellent form. We will march for him, and he will think for us". She attended the euphoric reception of the King in Paris on 3 May 1814, and the restoration of the monarchy. The King personally gave her his regards while on his way to attend the Sunday services when he spotted her in a crowd.

Upon Napoleon's return from Elba, she noted the contrast between the rapturous reception the Bourbons had received the previous year and Napoleon's tepid welcome upon his return to France from his exile in Elba, after which he initiated the Hundred Days war. Vigée Le Brun exhibited her staunch royalist sympathies in her memoirs, writing:

Without wishing to insult the memory of a great captain and many brave generals and soldiers who helped win such resounding victories, I would like nevertheless to ask where these victories led us, and whether we still own any of the land which cost us so dear? For my part, the bulletins from the Russian campaign both distressed and revolted me; one of the later ones spoke of the loss of thousands of French soldiers and added that the Emperor had never looked so well! We read this bulletin at the home of the Bellegarde ladies, and felt so angry that we threw it on to the fire. The fact that the people were tired of these interminable wars is easily attested by their lack of enthusiasm during the Hundred Days. More than once I saw Bonaparte appear at his window and then retire immediately, furious no doubt, for the acclamation of the crowd was limited to the shouts of a hundred or so boys, paid, I believe, as an act of derision to chant long live the Emperor! There is a sharp contrast between this indifference and the joyful enthusiasm which greeted the King on his entry into Paris on the 8th of July 1815; this joy was almost universal, for after the many misfortunes incurred by Bonaparte, Louis XVIII brought only peace.

Her Louveciennes home was once again looted in the Hundred Days, this time by British troops. Among the possessions lost during this incident was a lacquer box gifted to her by the Count Stroganov during her stay at Saint Petersburg, which she had prized immensely. Her estranged husband died in August 1813, in their old home built on the Rue de-Gros-Chenet. Though they had drifted apart for several years, she was nonetheless sorely affected by his death.

In 1819 she sold her portrait of Lady Hamilton as the Comaean Sibyl to the Duc de Berri, despite it being her favorite, because she wished to satisfy the Duke. She also painted two portraits of the Duchesse de Berri, initially in the Tuileries, but then finishing their sittings in her home. In the same year, her daughter Julie died of syphilis, which devastated her. The next year, her brother Étienne died an alcoholic, leaving her niece Caroline her principal heir. Her friends advised the grief-stricken artist to travel to Bordeaux to occupy her mind with something else. She traveled first to Orléans, where she resided in the Château de Méréville, where she was mesmerized by its elegance, beauty and architecture, designed in the English Garden style; she wrote that it "surpassed anything of its kind in England". She toured the city and sampled its architecture and landmarks, including the cathedral and the ruins surrounding the city. She then traveled to Blois where she visited the Château de Chambord, which she described it as "a romantic, fairy tale place". She then visited the Château de Chanteloup, residence of the late Étienne François, duc de Choiseul. Afterwards, she traveled to Tours, where the impure air forced her to quit the city after only two days. In Tours, she was received by the director of the academy, who offered to be her guide in the city. She also visited the ruins of the Marmoutier monastery. She then passed Poitiers and Angoulême on her way to Bordeaux. After arriving in Bordeaux, she stayed in the Fumel Hospice and was received there by the prefect, the Comte Camille de Tournon-Simiane. She toured the countryside and visited the cemetery, which she praised for its sepulchral beauty and symmetrical layout. It became her second-favorite after the Père La Chaise cemetery of Paris. She also visited the synagogue of Bordeaux, styled after the temple of Solomon, the ruins of the ancient Roman Gallien Arena. After spending a week in Bordeaux, she started back for Paris, greatly satisfied with her travels. During her journey, it was common for her to be mistaken for a noble lady owing to her expensive carriage; she later lamented in her memoirs that this often meant she had to pay more in the inns where she resided.

Her journey to Bordeaux was the last time she traveled extensively.

==== Friendship with Antoine Jean-Gros ====
The artist formed an intimate friendship with Antoine-Jean Gros, whom she had known since he was seven years old and had painted his portrait when he was at that age, during which she had noticed an artistic inclination in the child.

==== Later years ====
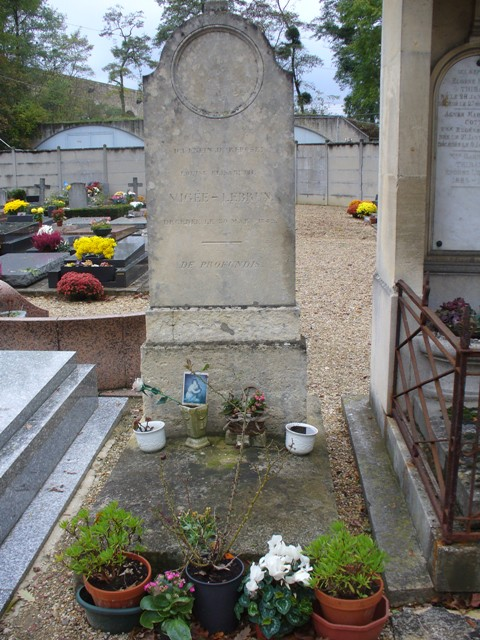
Vigée Le Brun's grave in Louveciennes

She spent most of her time in Louveciennes, typically eight months of the year. She formed new friendships with people including the writer and man of letters M. de Briffaut, the playwright Jean-Baptiste-Denis Despré, the writer Aimé Martin, the composer Marc-Antoine Madeleine Désaugiers, the painter and antiquarian Comte de Forbin, and the famous painter Antoine-Jean Gros. She hosted these people and socialized with them regularly in her countryside home or in Paris, as well as her old friend the Princess Kourakin. She painted Saint Geneviève, with the face being a posthumous portrait of 12-year old Julie. For the local chapel, the Comtesse de Genlis graced this painting with two separate poems; one for the saint, the other for the painter. She spent her time with her nieces Caroline Rivière and Eugénie Tripier-Le Franc, whom she came to regard as her own children. She had tutored the latter in painting since childhood and was greatly pleased to see her blossom into a professional artist. Eugénie and Caroline would assist her in writing her memoirs, late in her life. She died in Paris on 30 March 1842, aged 86. She was buried at the Cimetière de Louveciennes near her old home. Her tombstone epitaph says "Ici, enfin, je repose..." (Here, at last, I rest...).

== Exhibitions ==
During her lifetime, Vigée Le Brun's work was publicly exhibited in Paris at the Académie de Saint-Luc (1774), Salon de la Correspondance (1779, 1781, 1782, 1783) and Salon of the Académie in Paris (1783, 1785, 1787, 1789, 1791, 1798, 1802, 1817, 1824).

The first retrospective exhibition of Vigée Le Brun's work was held in 1982 at the Kimbell Art Museum in Fort Worth, Texas. The first major international retrospective exhibition of her art premiered at the Galeries nationales du Grand Palais in Paris (2015–2016). It was subsequently shown at the Metropolitan Museum of Art in New York City (2016) and the National Gallery of Canada in Ottawa (2016).

== Portrayal in popular culture ==
The 2014 docudrama made for French television, Le fabuleux destin d'Élisabeth Vigée Le Brun, directed by Arnaud Xainte, and starring Marlène Goulard and Julie Ravix as the young and old Élisabeth respectively, is available in English as The Fabulous Life of Élisabeth Vigée Le Brun.

An episode of the 1980 BBC television series, 100 Great Paintings, presented by the art historian and author, Anita Brookner, featured Vigée Le Brun's Self-portrait with her Daughter, 1789.

In the episode "The Portrait" from the BBC series Let Them Eat Cake (1999) written by Peter Learmouth, starring Dawn French and Jennifer Saunders, Madame Vigée Le Brun (Maggie Steed) paints a portrait of the Comtesse de Vache (Jennifer Saunders) weeping over a dead canary.

Vigée Le Brun is one of only three characters in Joel Gross's Marie Antoinette: The Color of Flesh (premiered in 2007), a fictionalized historical drama about a love triangle set against the backdrop of the French Revolution.

Vigée Le Brun's portrait of Marie Antoinette is featured on the cover of the 2010 album Nobody's Daughter by Hole.

Élisabeth Vigée Le Brun is a dateable non-player character in the historically-based dating sim video game Ambition: A Minuet in Power published by Joy Manufacturing Co.

Singer-songwriter Kelly Chase released the song "Portrait of a Queen" in 2021 to accompany the History Detective Podcast, Season 2, Episode 3 Marie Antionette's Portrait Artist: Vigée Le Brun.

In the PBS historical drama series Marie Antoinette (2022), Elisabeth Vigée Le Brun is portrayed by actress Leïla Muse. In the episode "Treacherous Legacy" (Season 2, Episode 3), she is shown painting the queen in her iconic portrait Marie Antoinette in a Chemise Dress (1783), which sparked backlash for depicting the queen in informal attire. Following the controversy, the painting was revised and became the more familiar Marie Antoinette with a Rose (1783).

== Gallery ==
=== Portraits painted in France ===
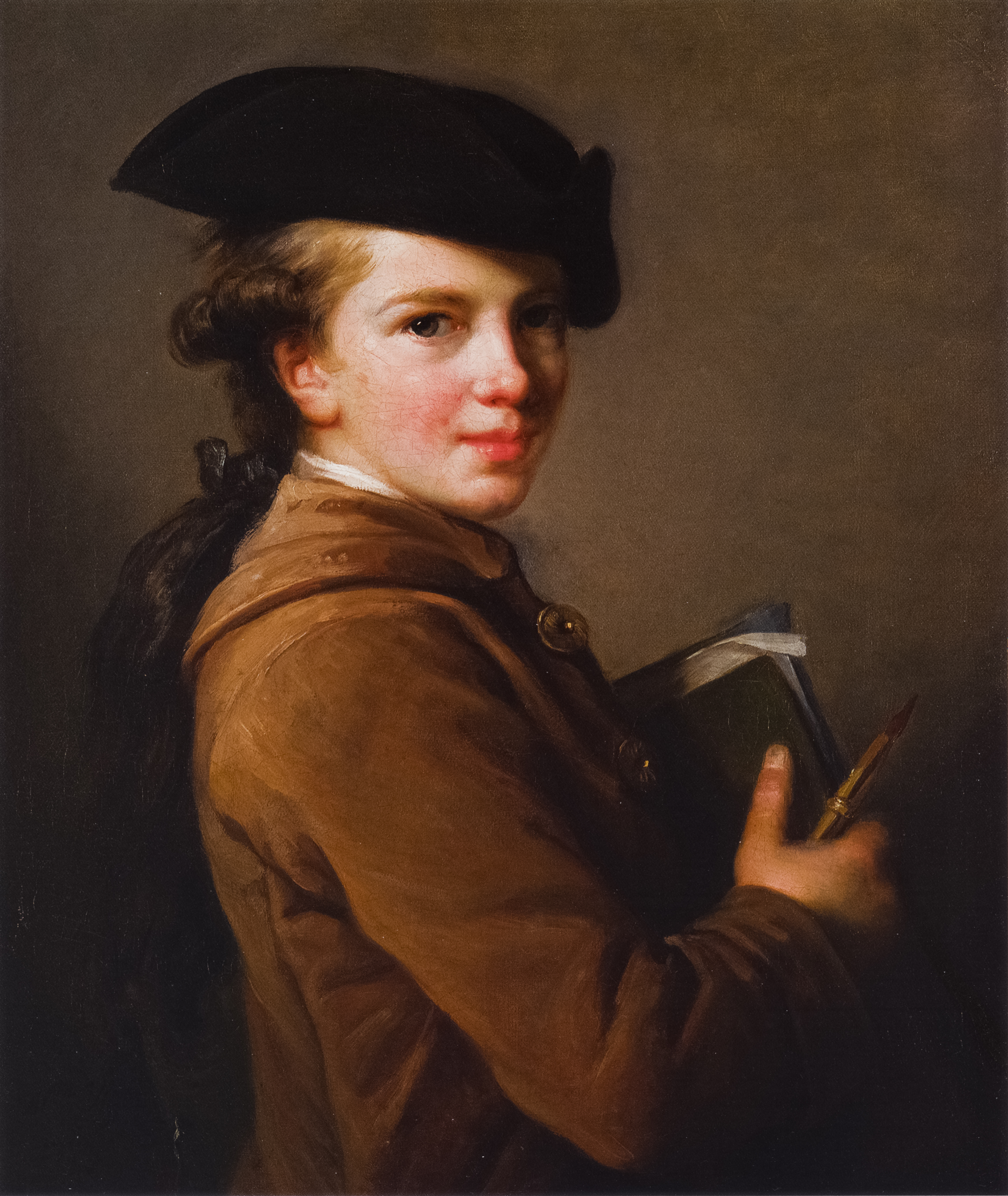
Étienne Vigée, 1773, Saint Louis Art Museum.

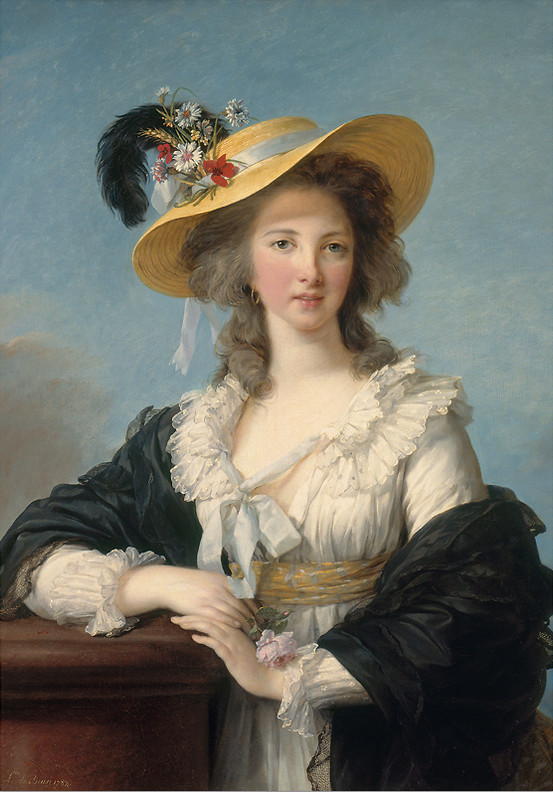
Duchesse de Polignac, 1782 oil on canvas, Musée de l'Histoire de France (Versailles).

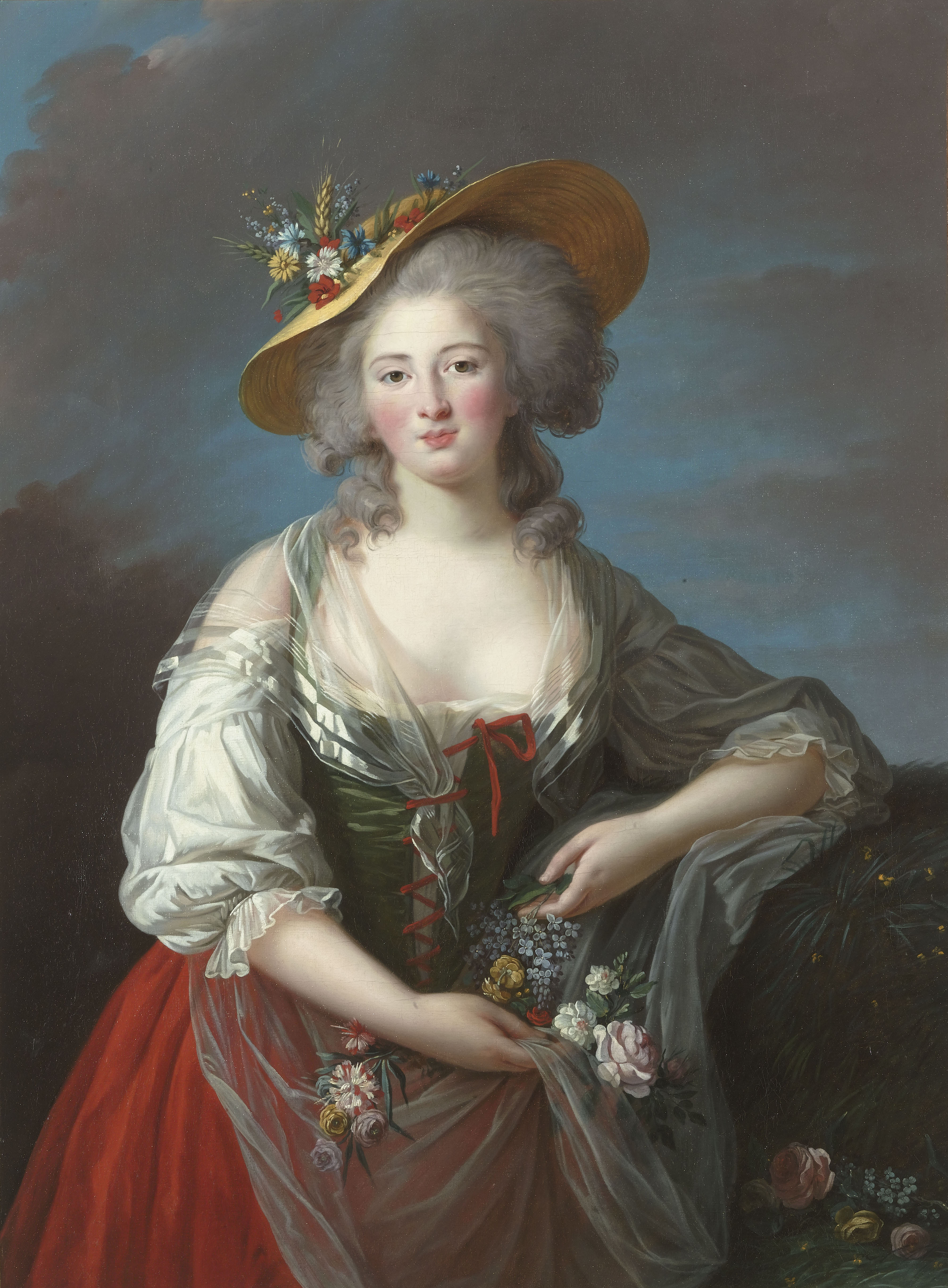
Élisabeth of France, sister of Louis XVI, 1782, Musée de l'Histoire de France

Madame du Barry, 1782. The last Maîtresse-en-titre of Louis XV of France and a victim of the Reign of Terror." One of three Vigée Le Brun portraits, including a posthumous portrait that she finished in 1805.

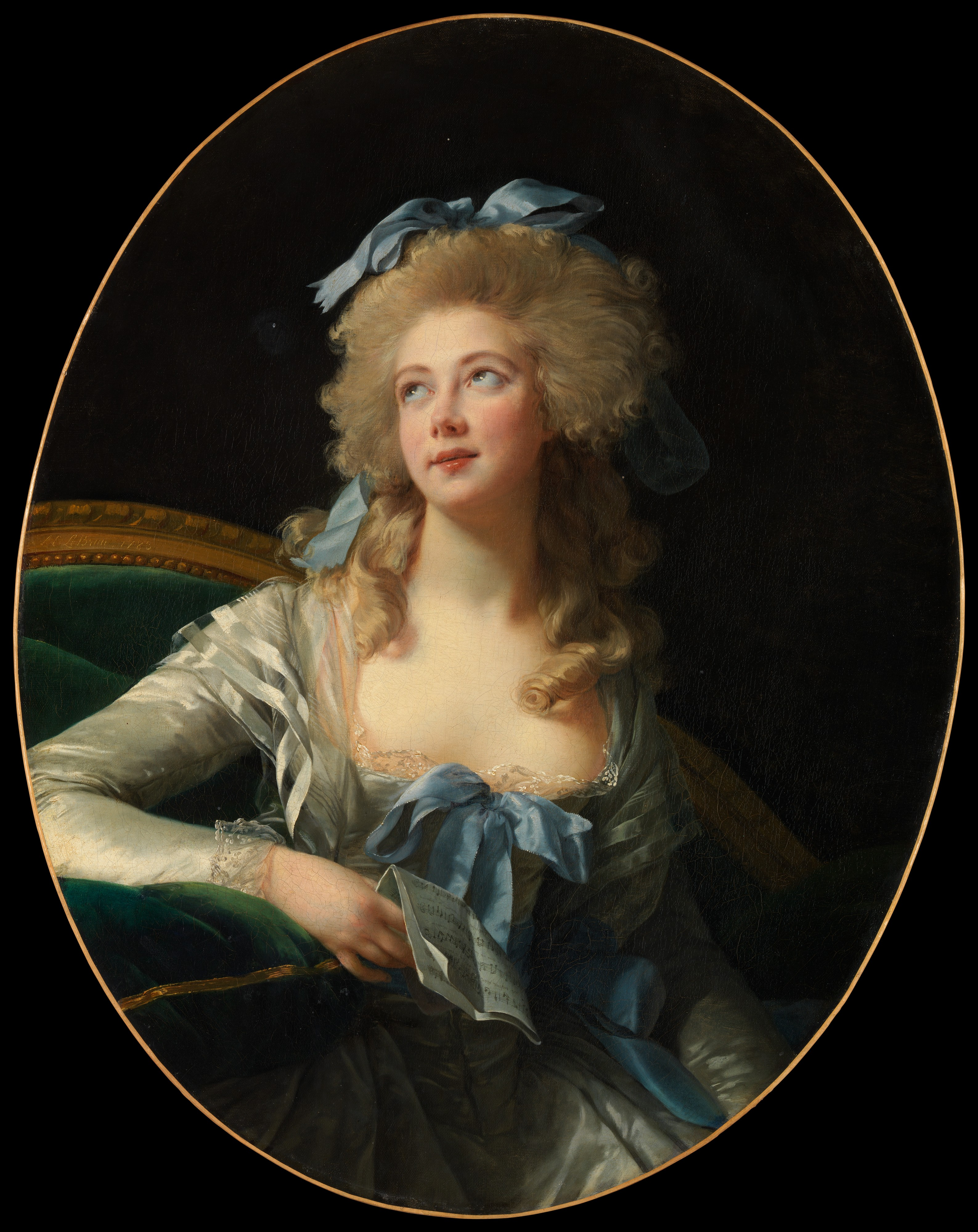
Madame Grand, 1783, Metropolitan Museum of Art.

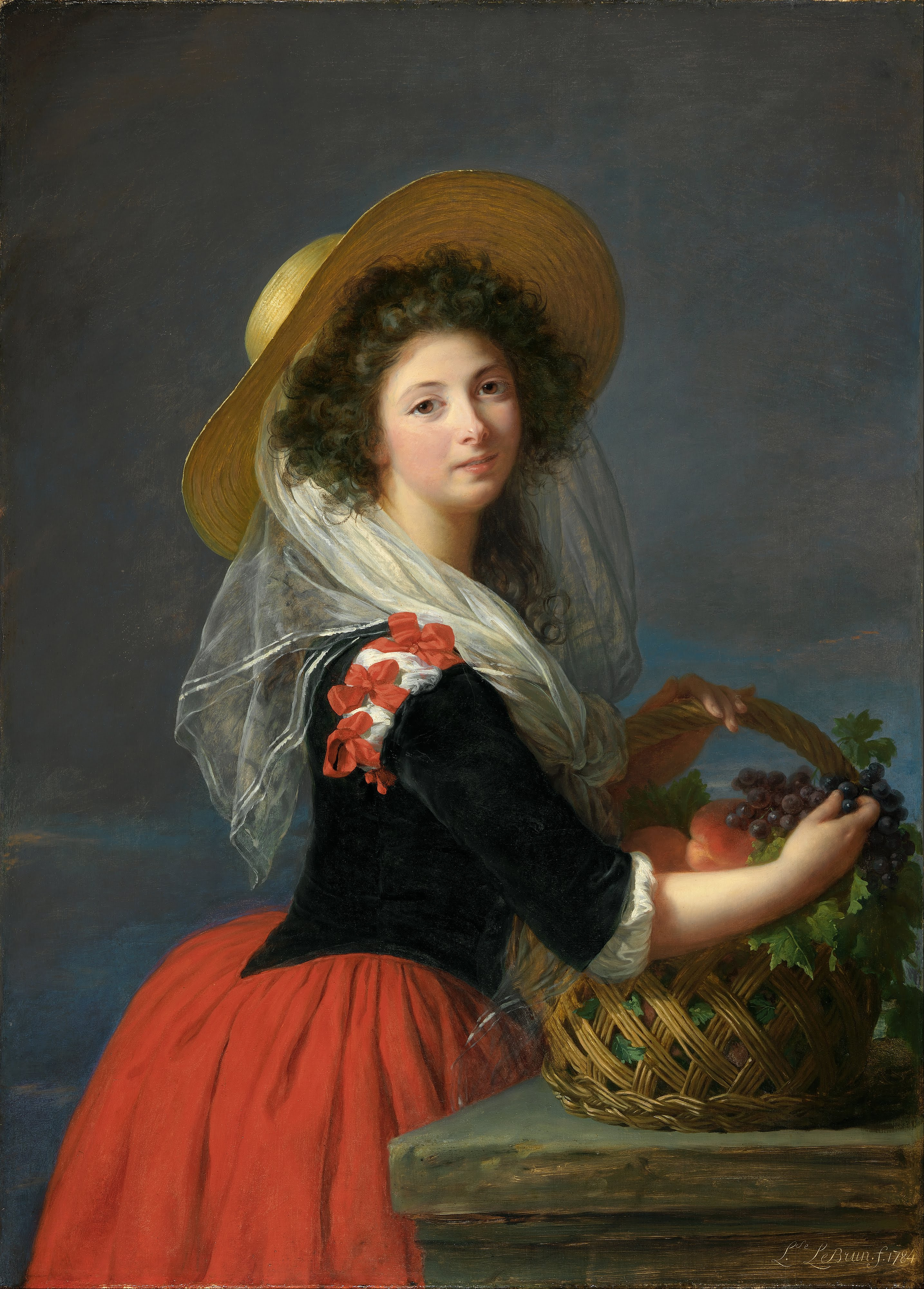
Marie-Gabrielle de Gramont, Duchesse de Caderousse, 1784, Nelson-Atkins Museum of Art.

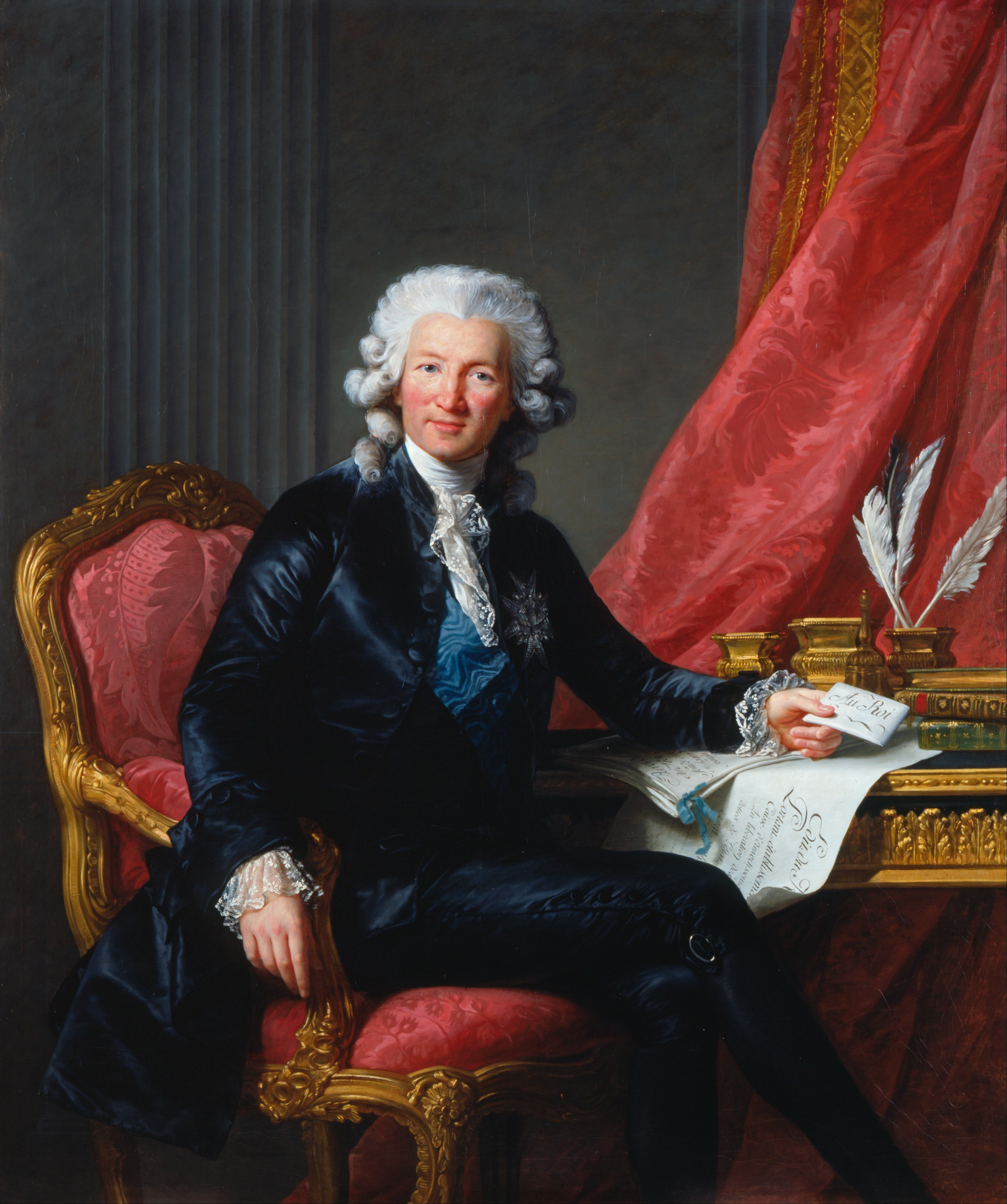
Portrait of Charles Alexandre de Calonne, 1784, Royal Collection.

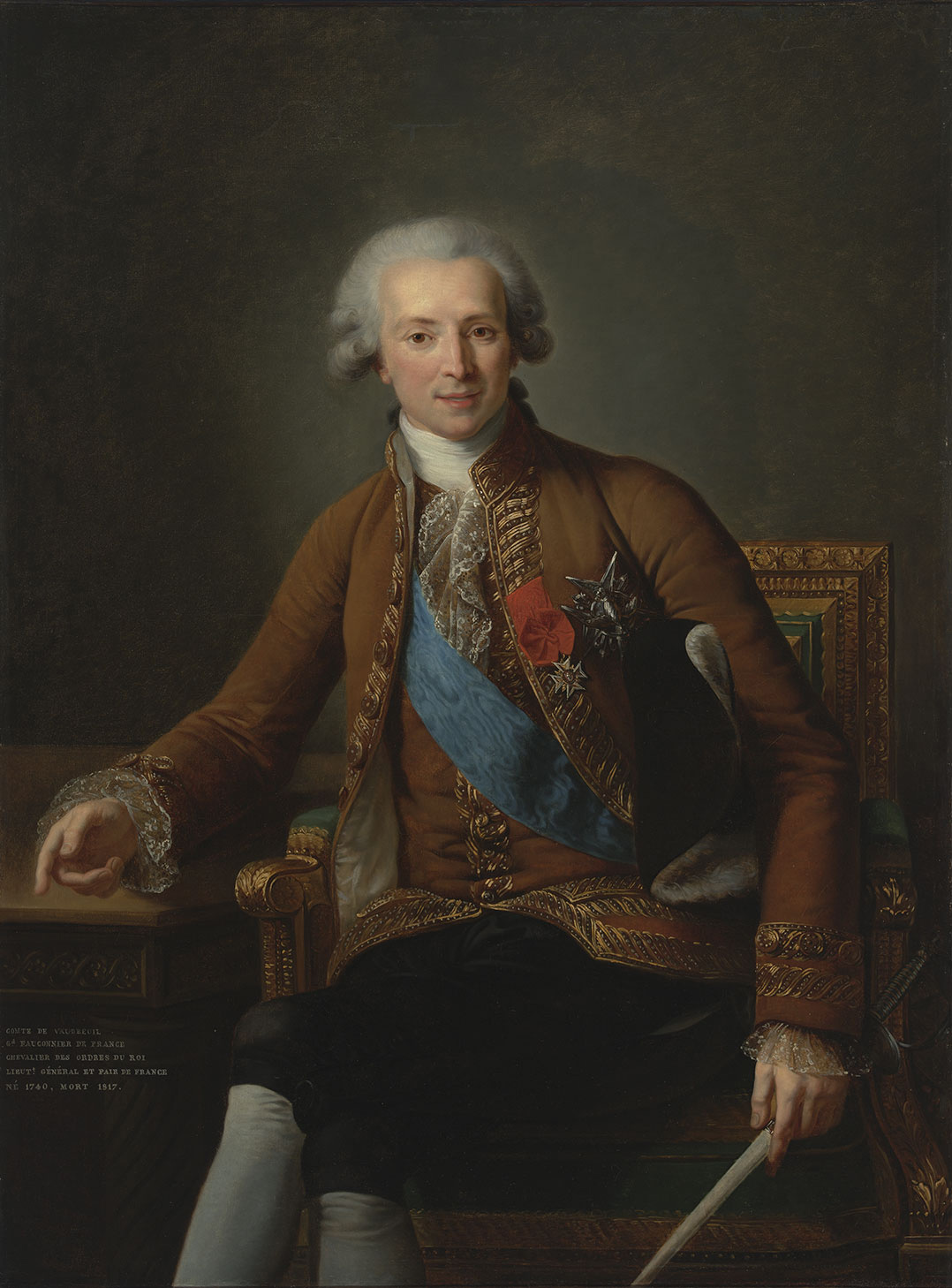
Portrait of the Comte de Vaudreuil, 1784, Virginia Museum of Fine Arts

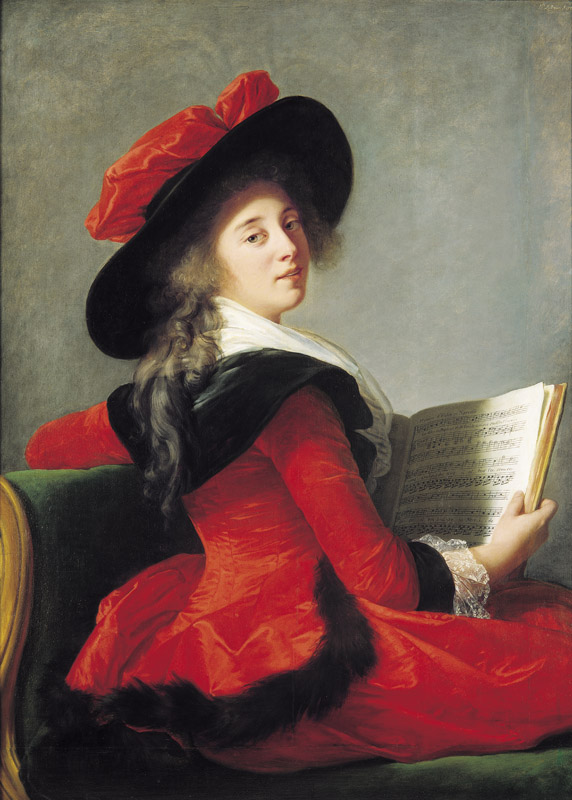
Baronne de Crussol, 1785, Musée des Augustins.

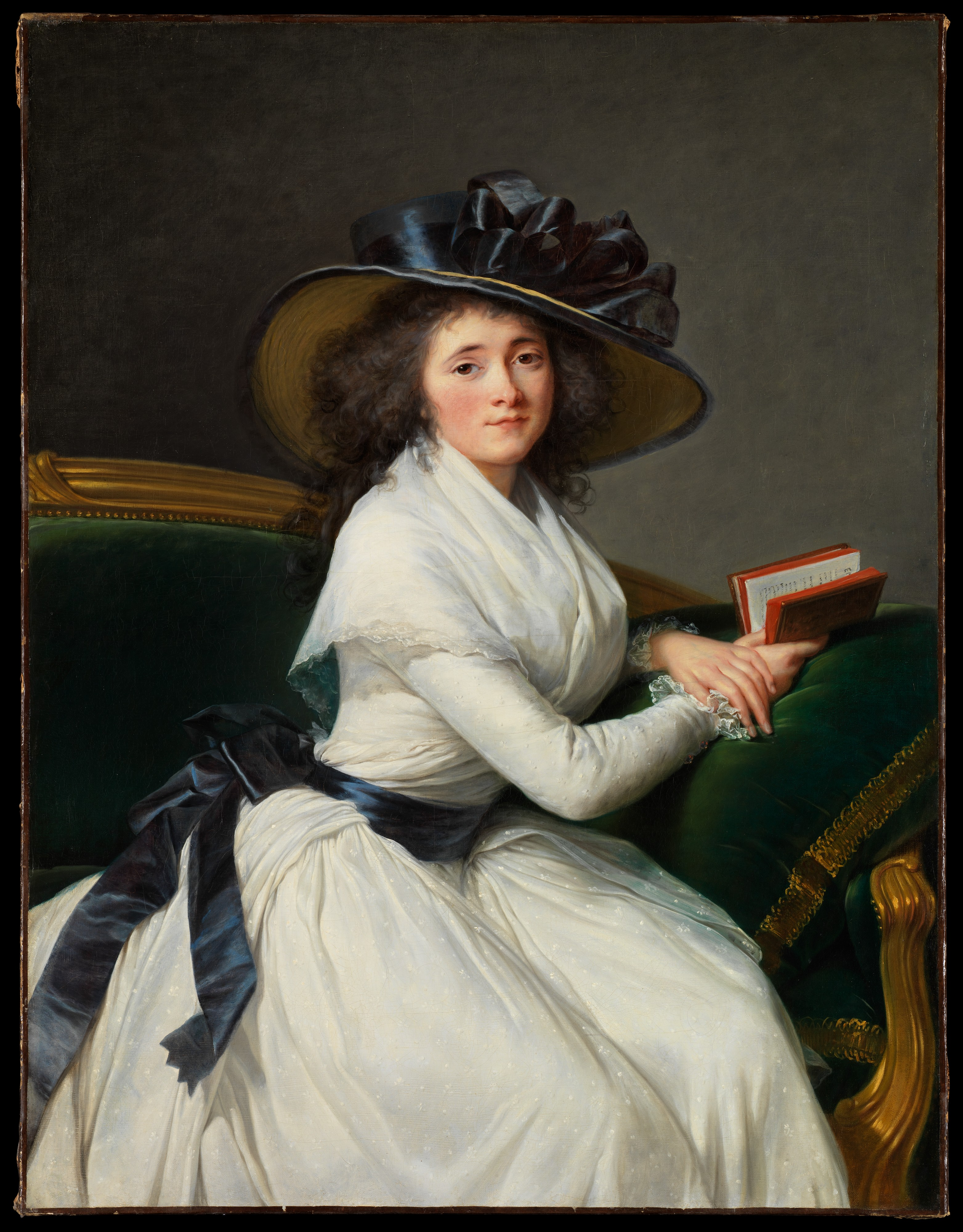
Comtesse de La Châtre, 1789, Metropolitan Museum of Art.

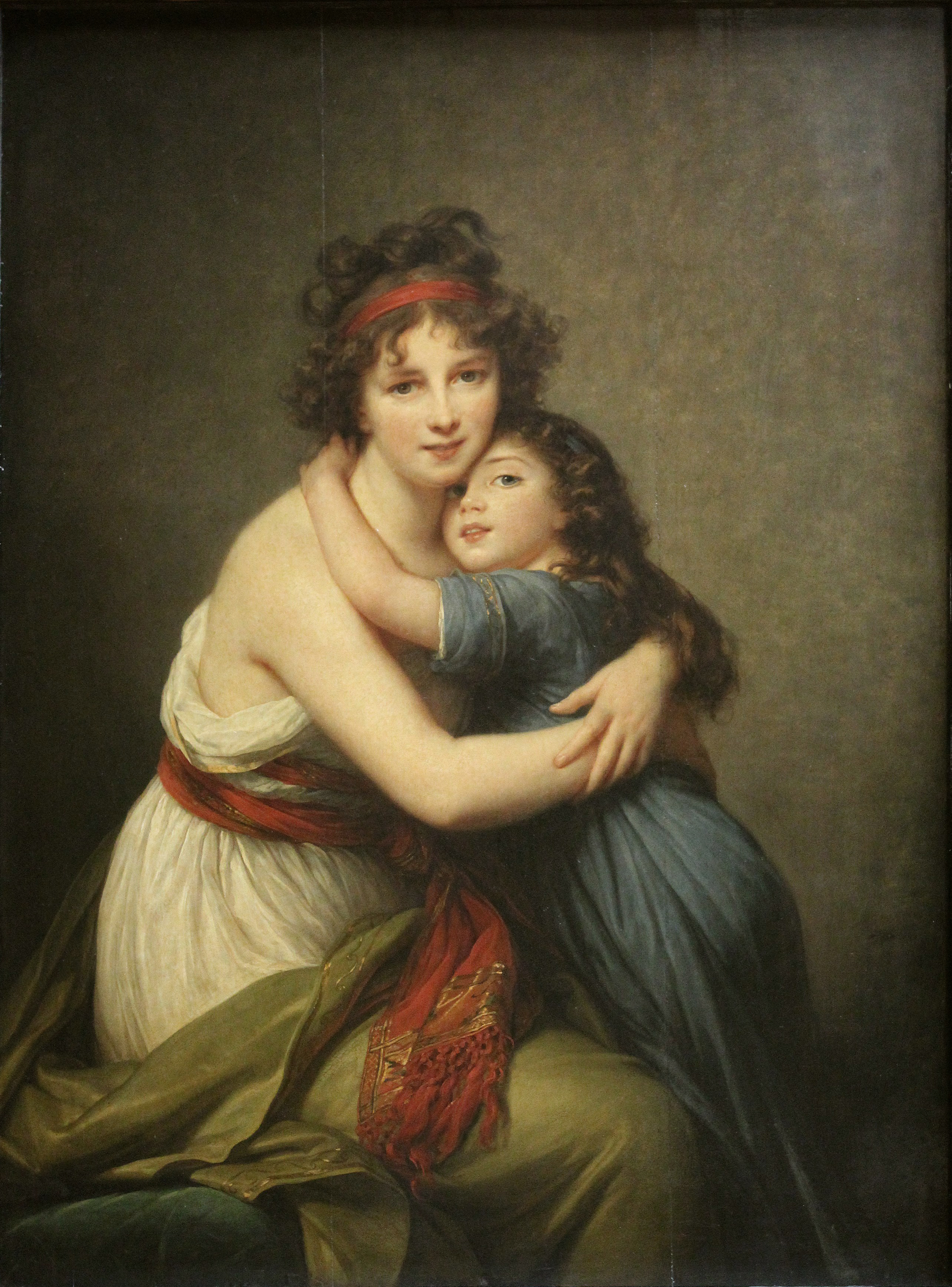
Self-portrait with her Daughter, 1789, Louvre.

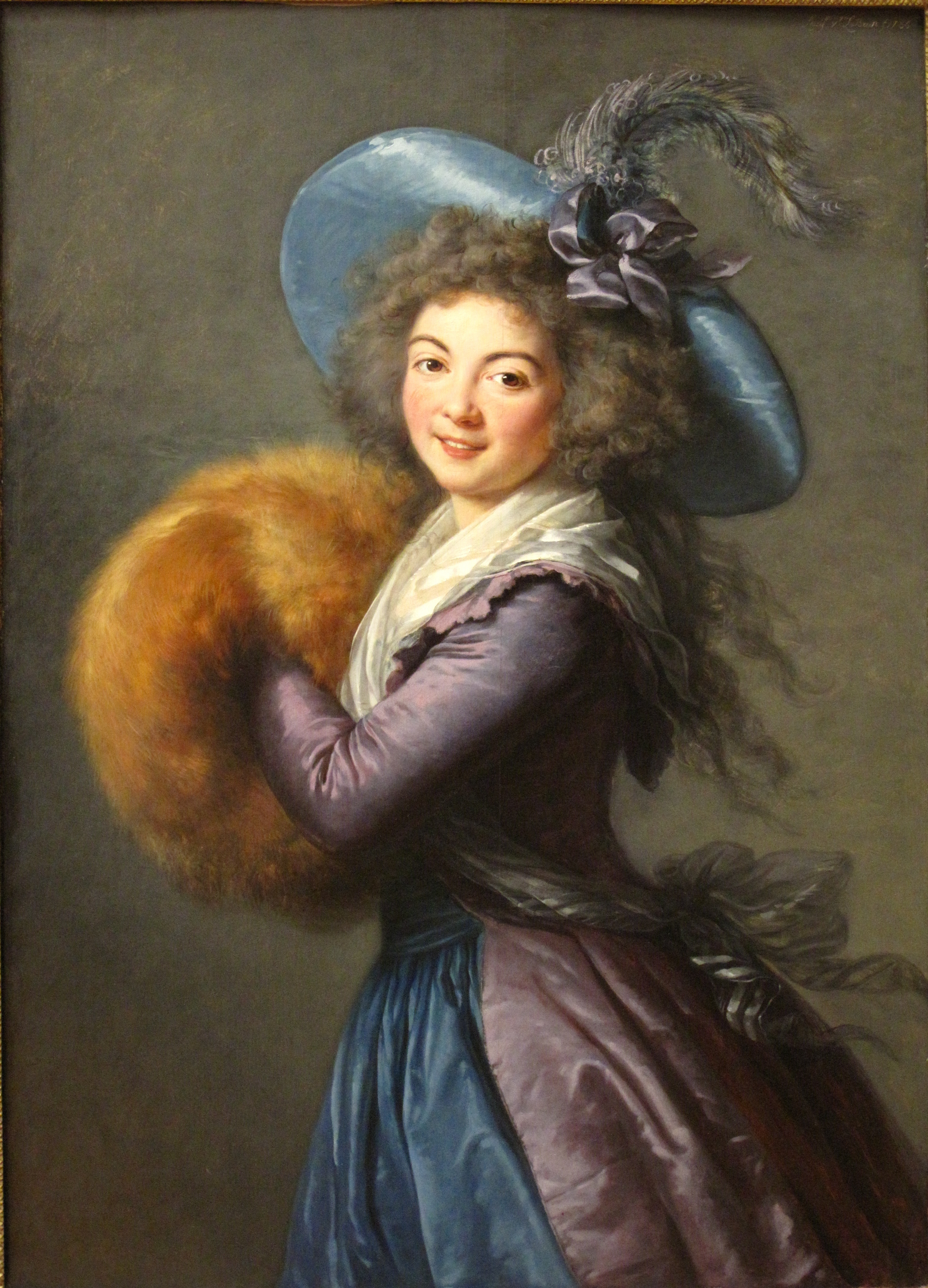
Madame Molé-Reymond, actrice de la Comédie italienne, 1786, Louvre Museum.

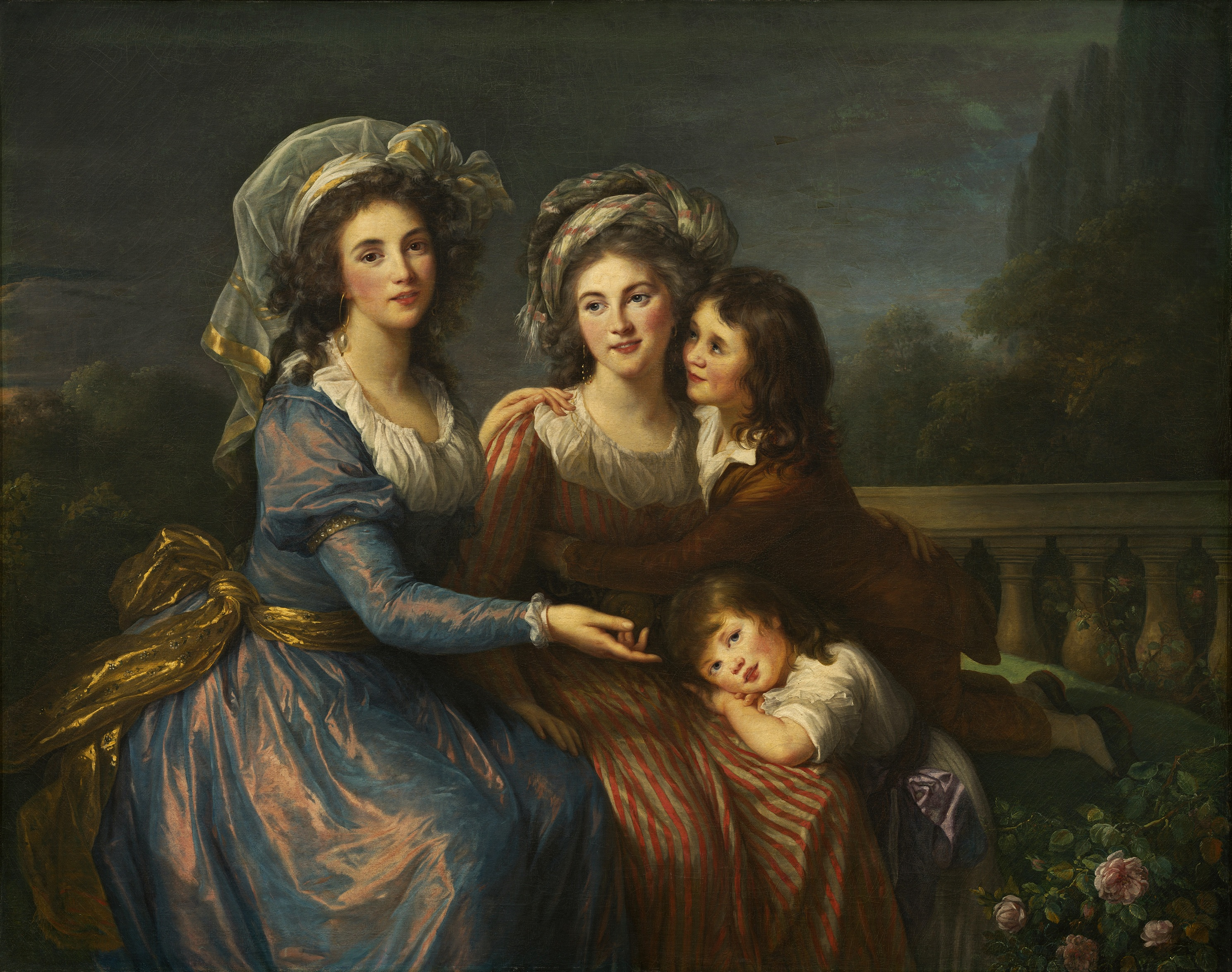
The Marquise de Pezay, and the Marquise de Rougé with her Sons Alexis and Adrien, 1787.

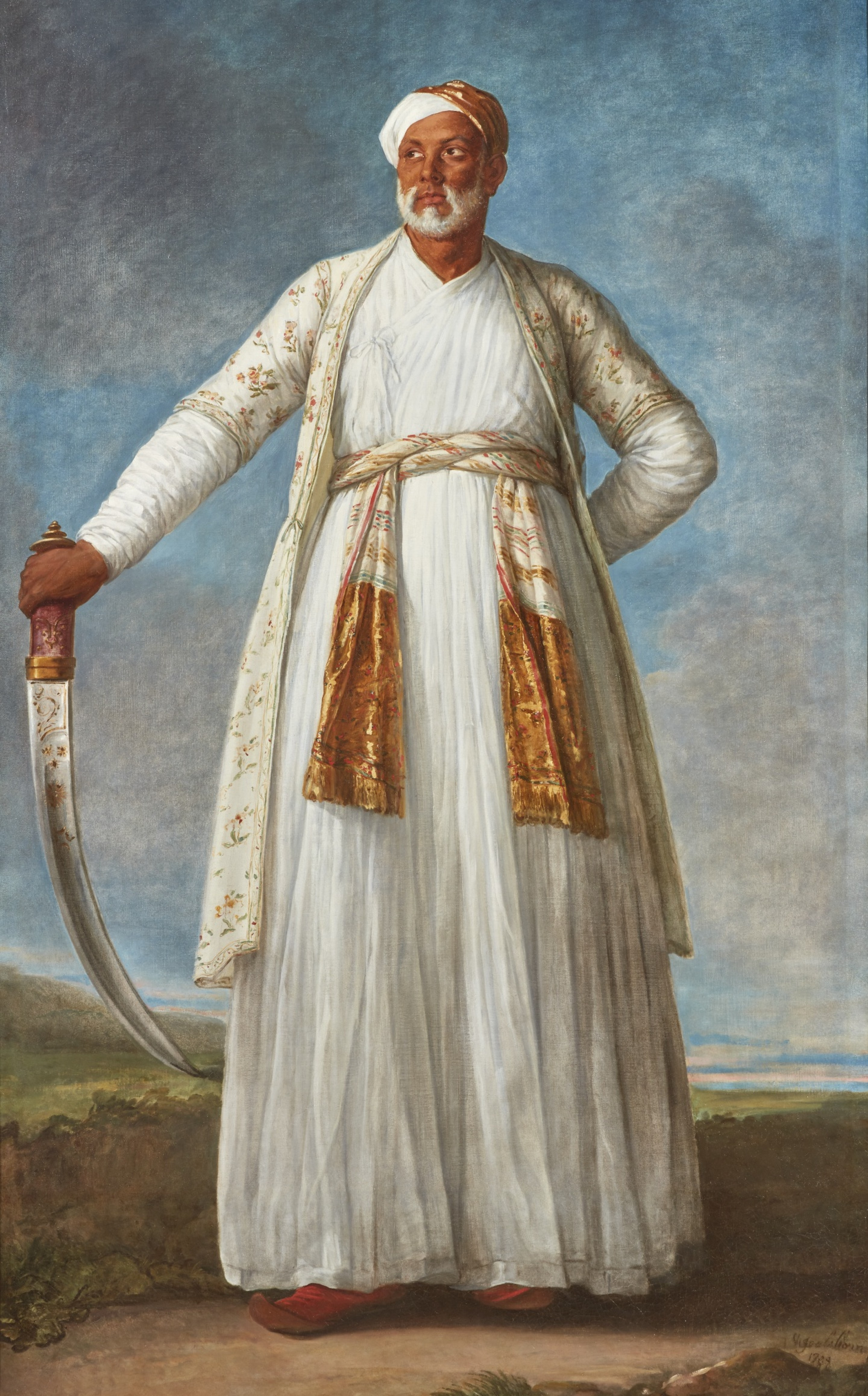
Muhammad Dervish Khan, 1788. Private collection.

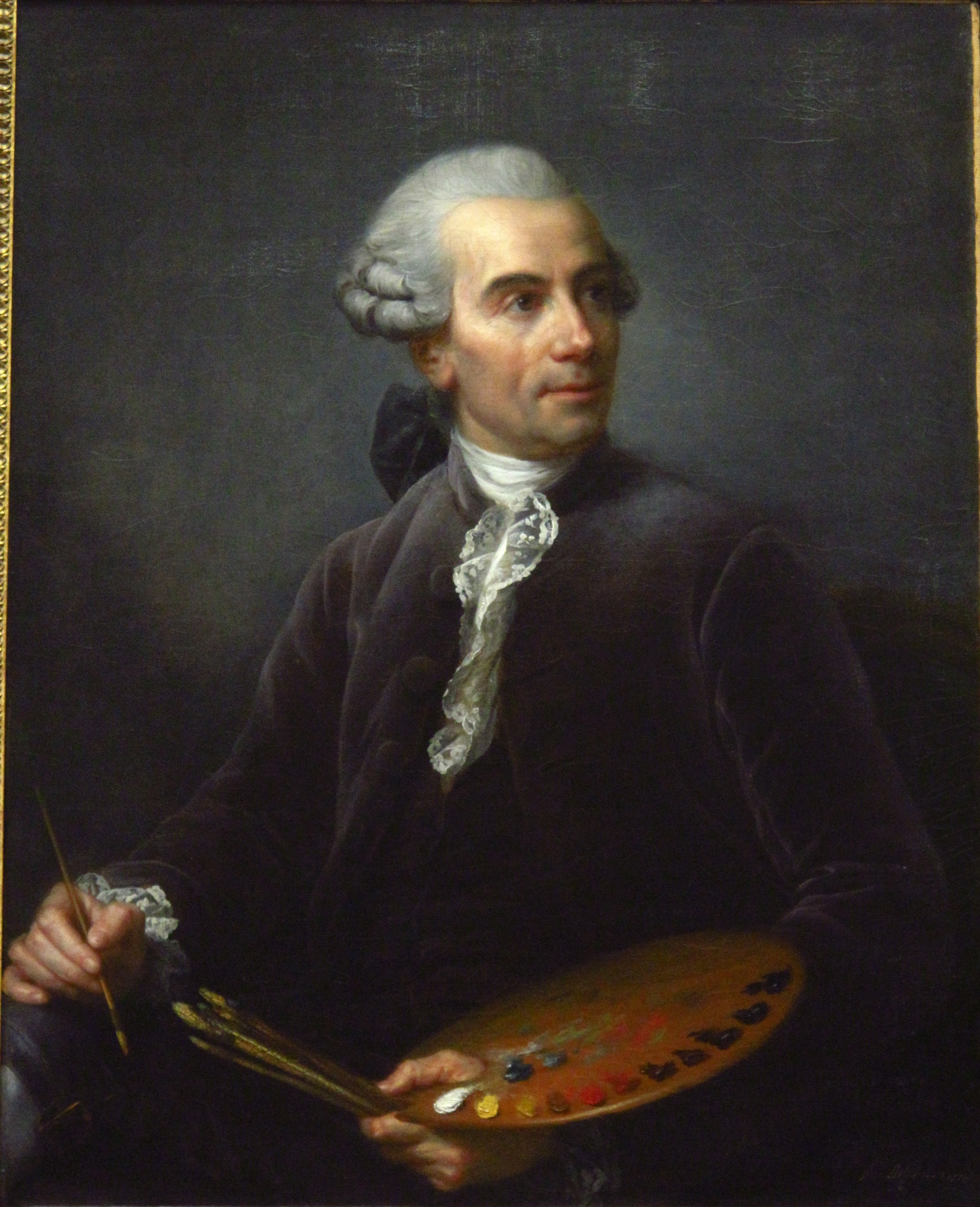
Portrait of Joseph Vernet, 1778, Louvre Museum.

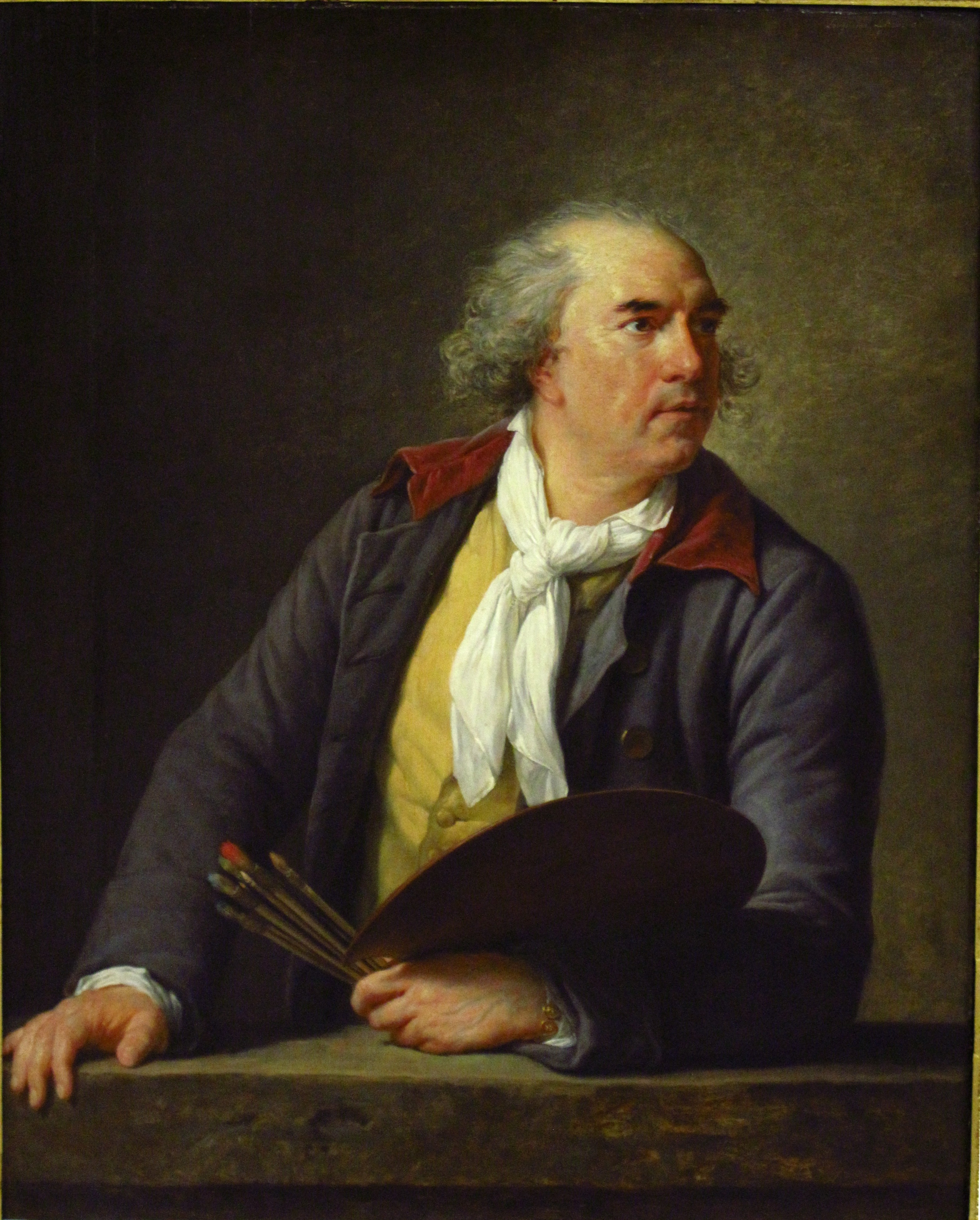
Portrait of Hubert Robert, 1788. Exhibited at the Salon of 1789, Louvre Museum.

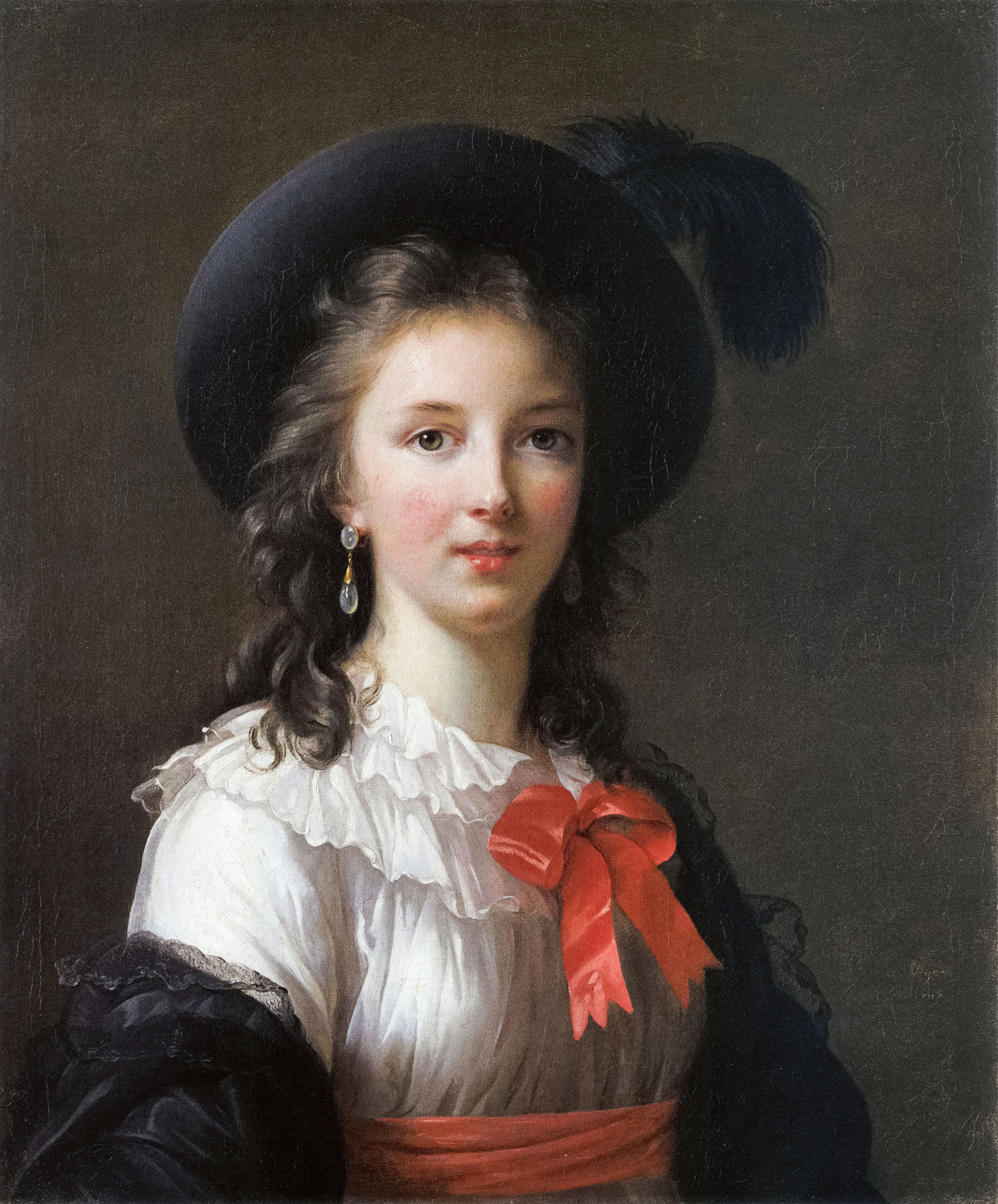
Self-Portrait, 1781, Kimbell Art Museum.

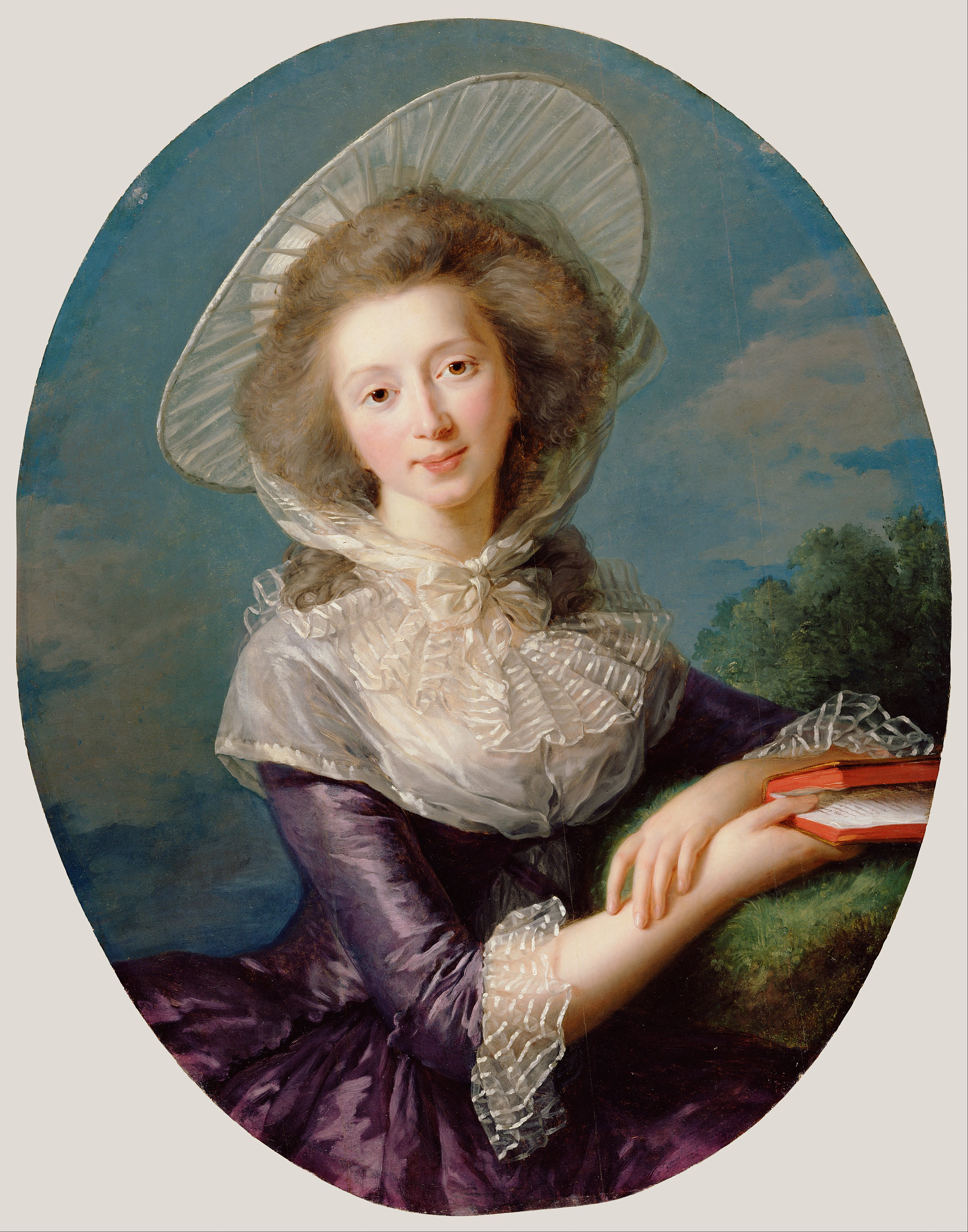
Vicomtesse de Vaudreuil, 1785, Getty Center.

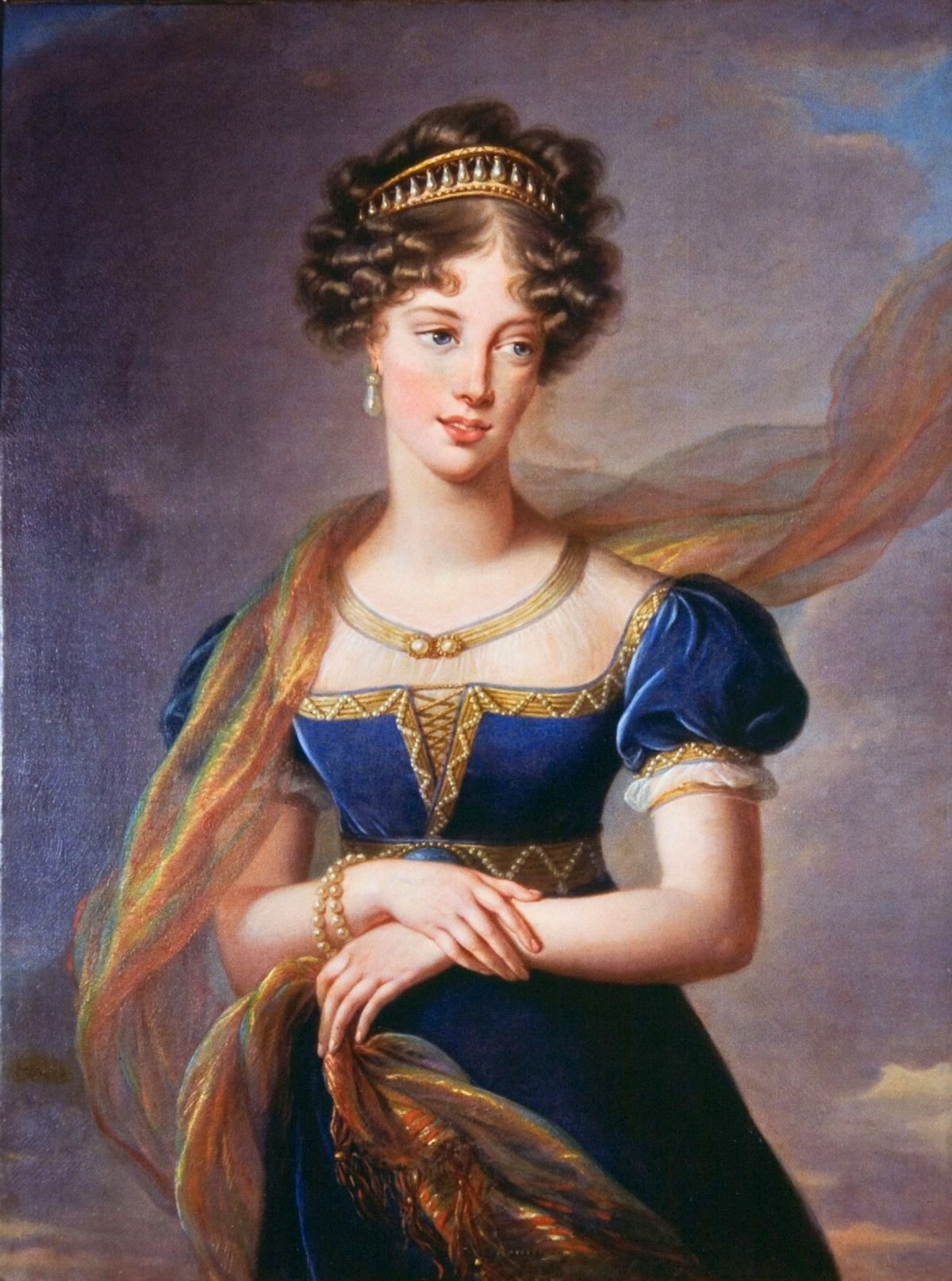
Portrait of the Duchess of Berry, 1824, Private collection

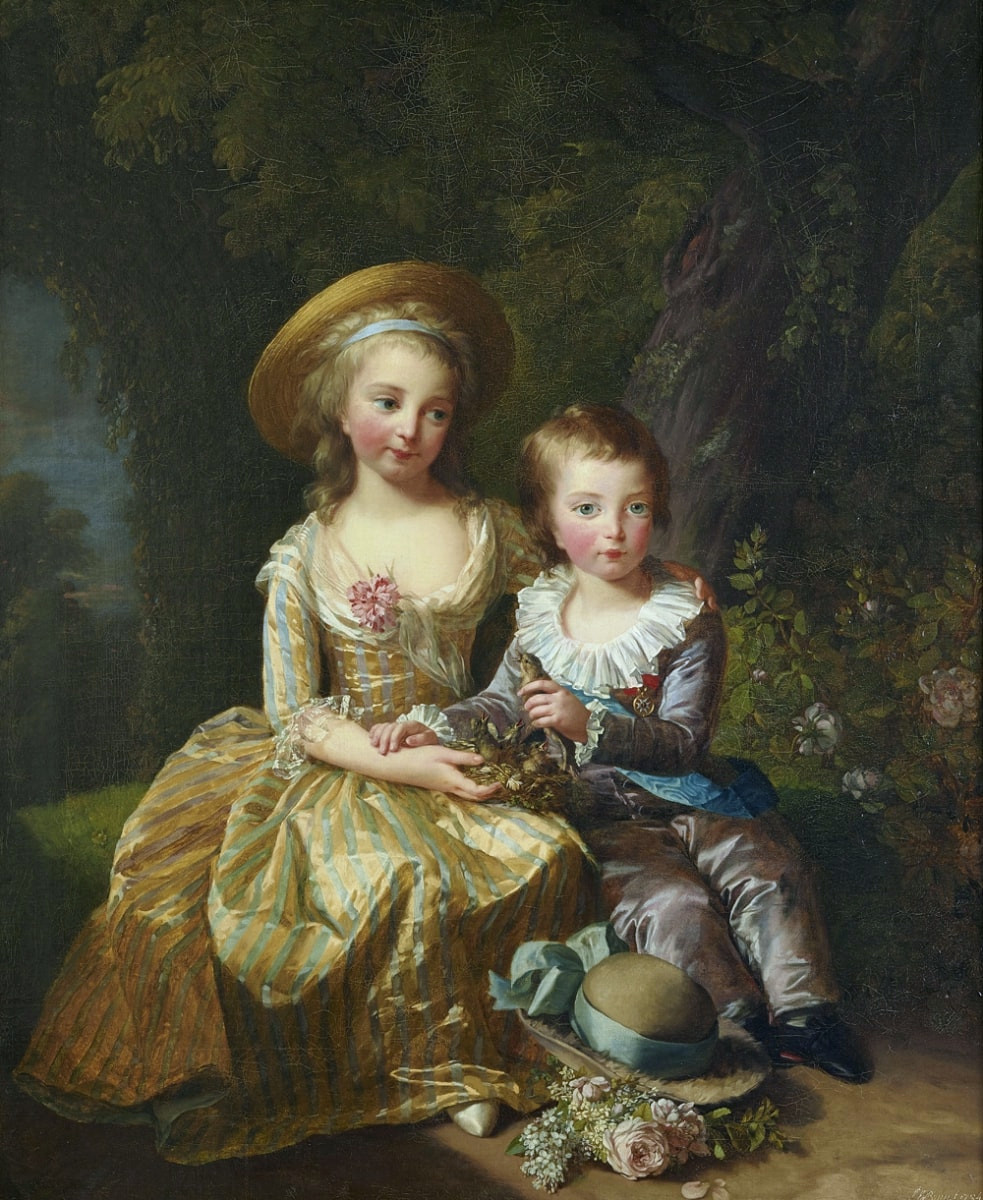
Portrait of Madame Royale and Louis Joseph, 1784, Palace of Versailles

Portrait of Madame Perregaux, 1789, Wallace Collection

=== Portraits painted in Italy ===
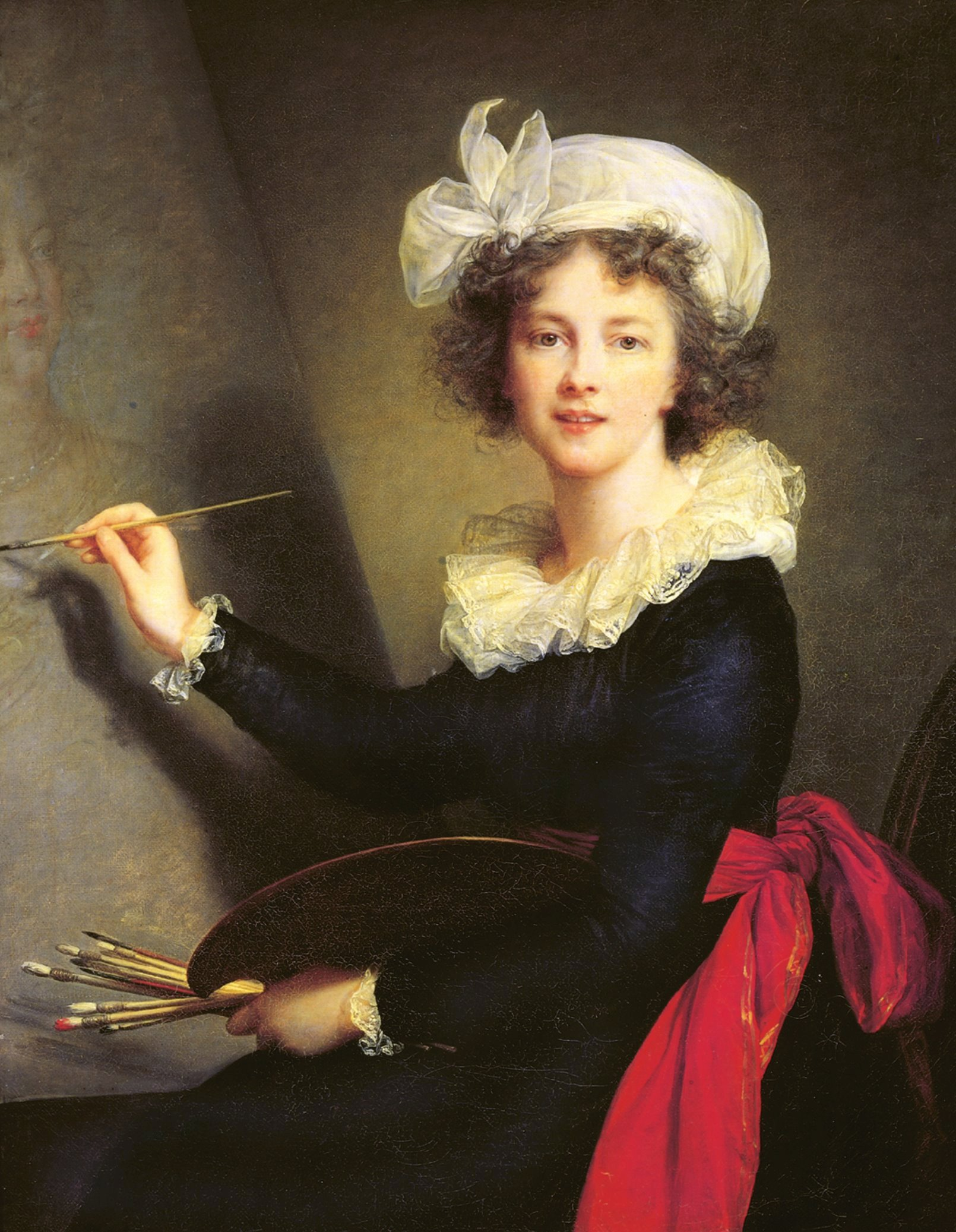
Self-portrait, painting Marie Antoinette, 1790, Uffizi.

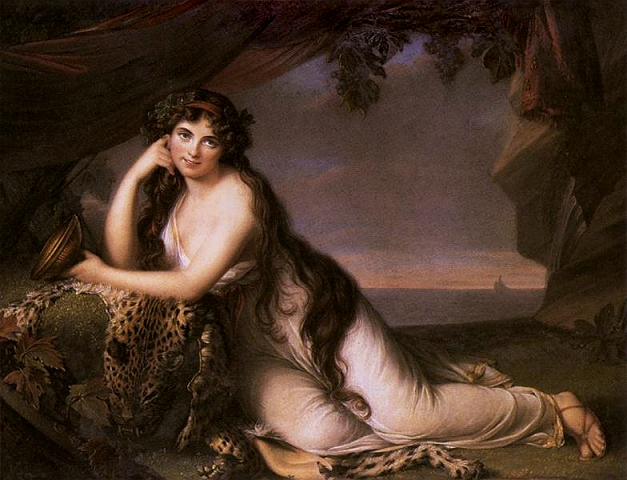
Emma, Lady Hamilton as Ariadne, 1790. Private Collection. Painted in Naples.

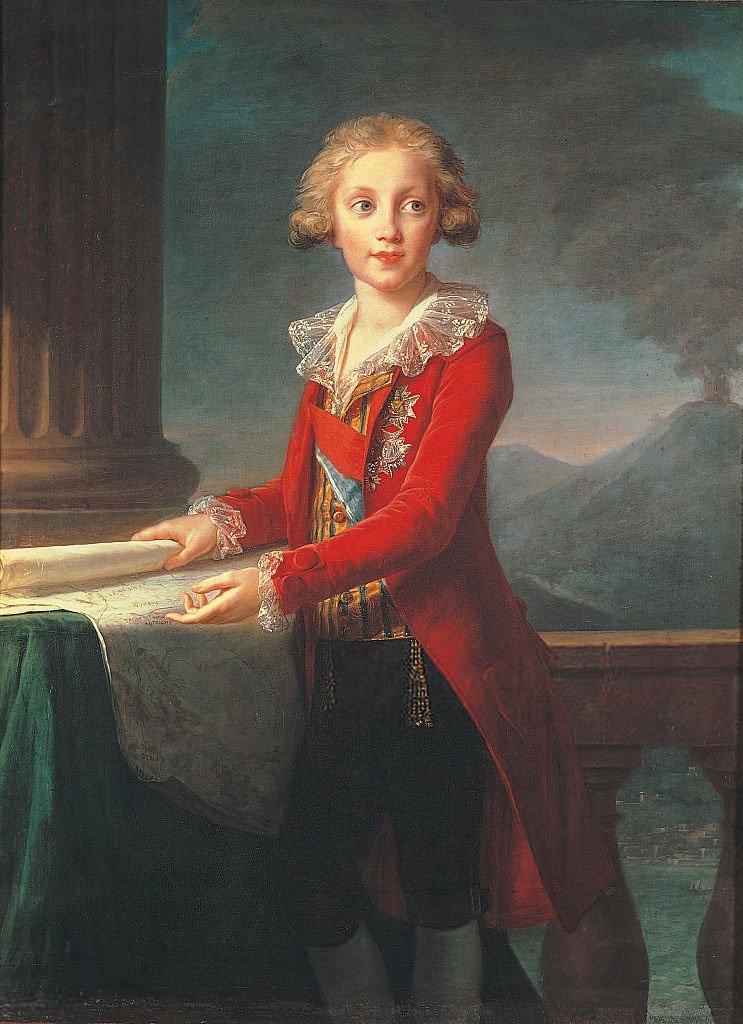
Francesco di Borbone, 1790, Museo di Capodimonte.

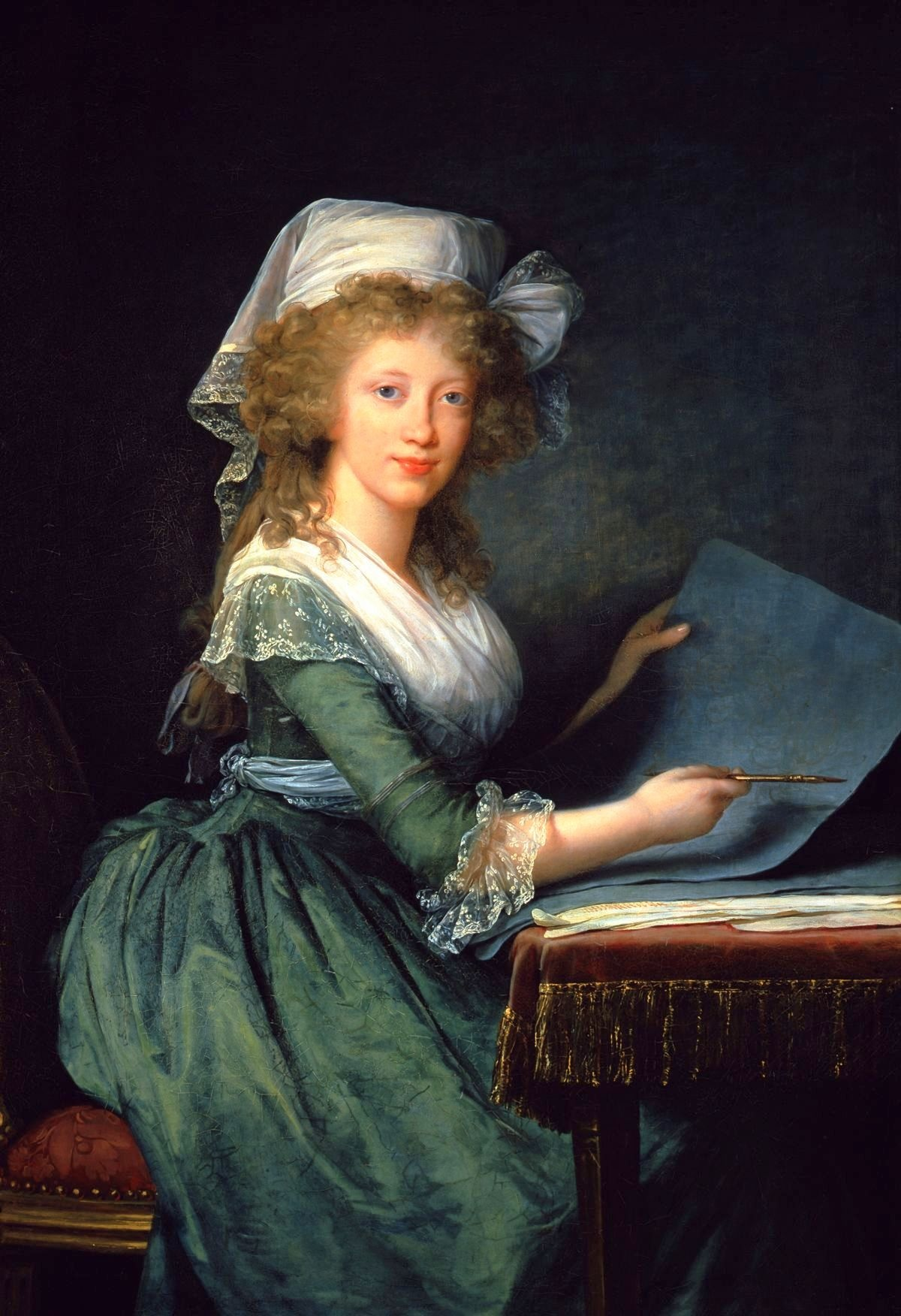
Luisa Maria Amelia di Borbone, 1790, Museo di Capodimonte.

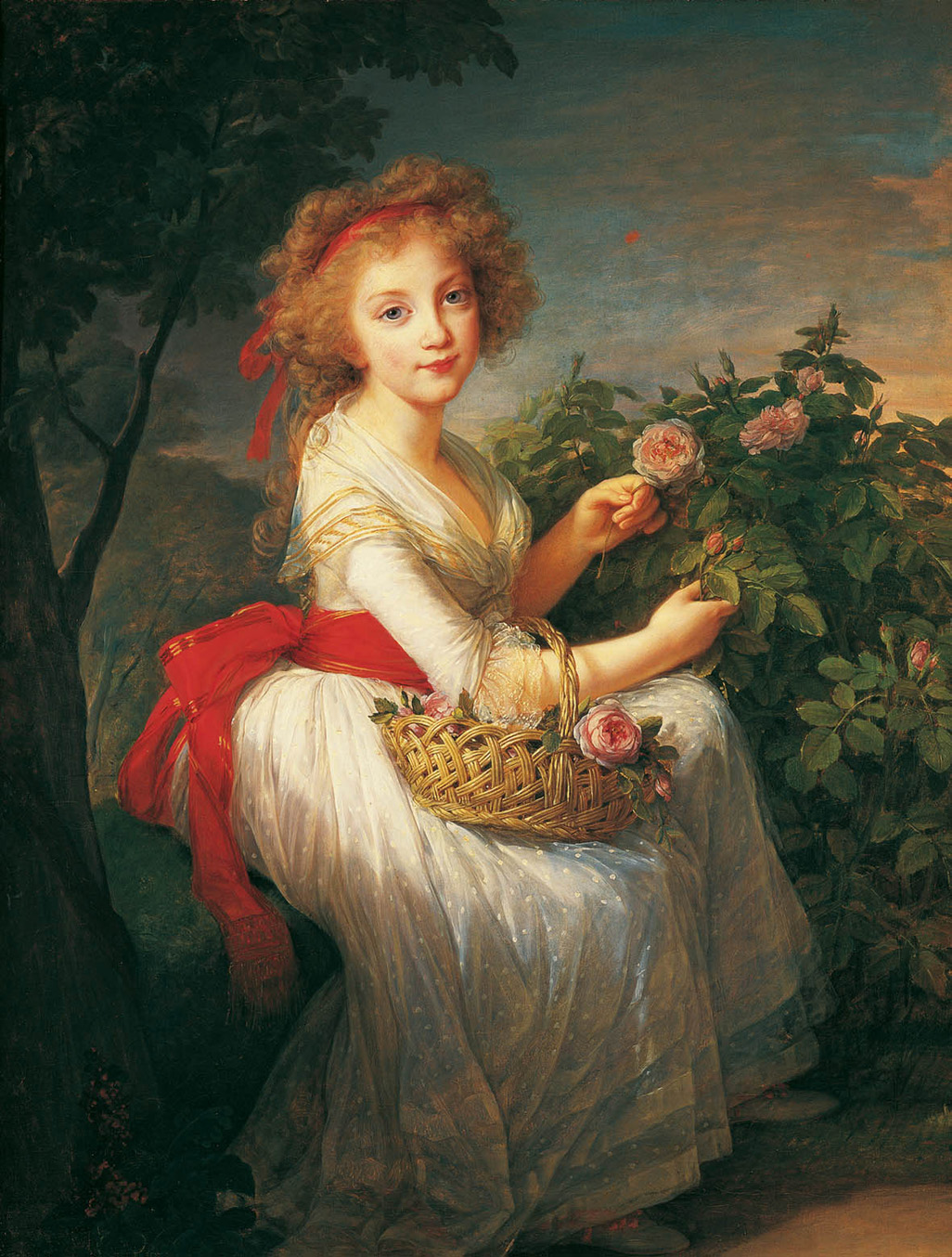
Maria Cristina of Bourbon, 1790, Museo di Capodimonte.

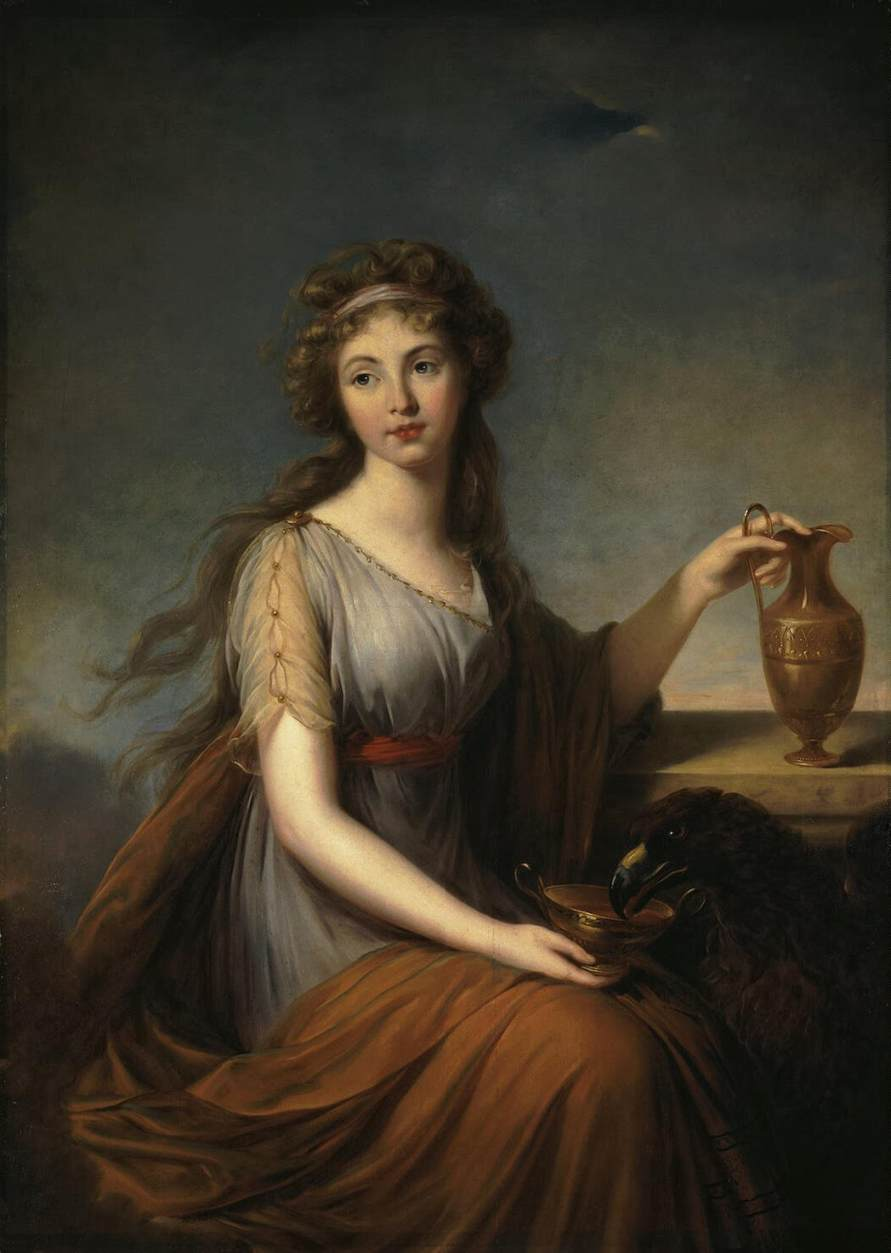
Anne Pitt as Hebe, 1792, Hermitage Museum.

Lady Hamilton as a Bacchante, 1792, Lady Lever Art Gallery.

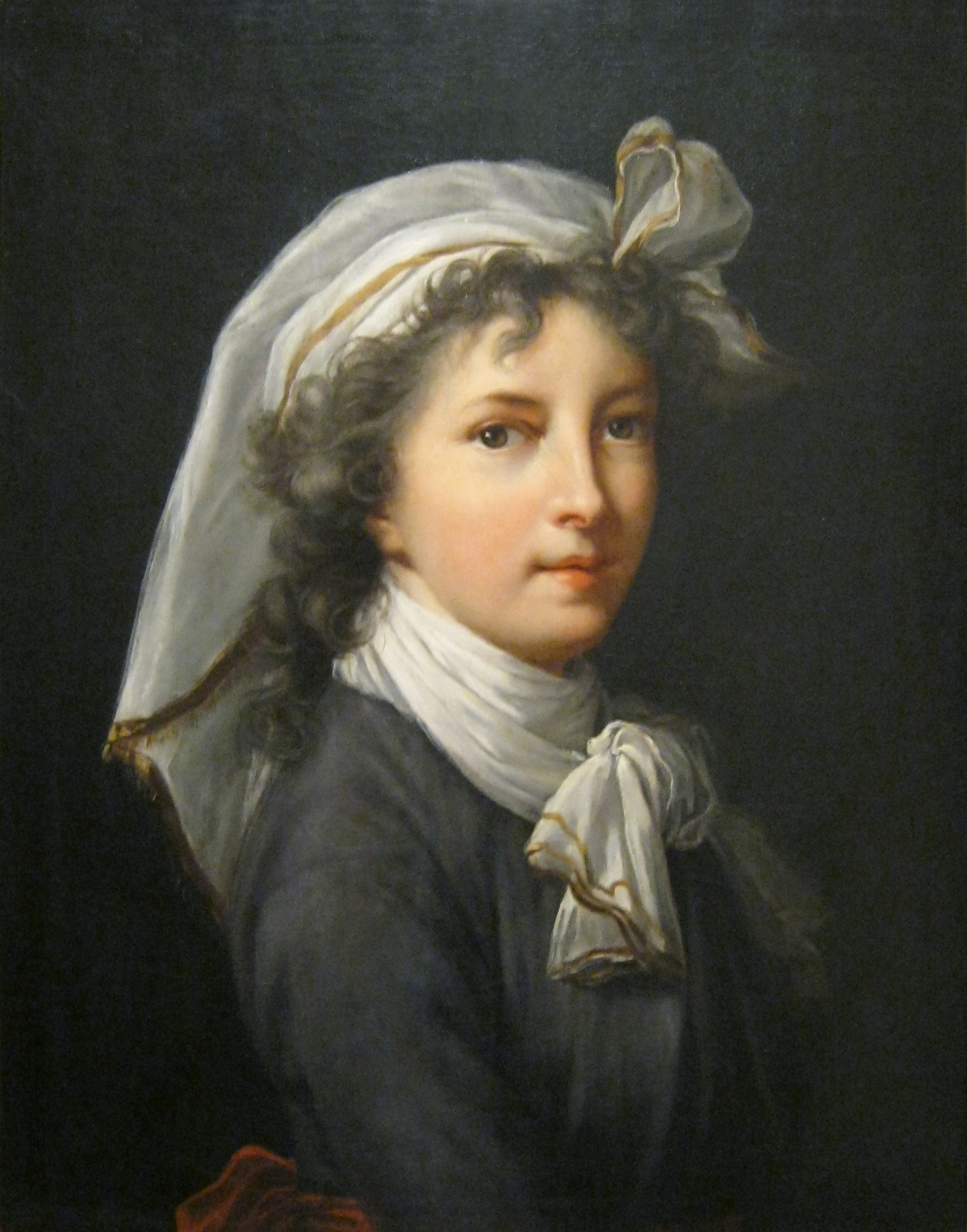
Copy of her 1790 self-portrait, originally done for the accademia di St. Luca in Rome.

Countess Skavronskaia, Jacquemart-André museum.

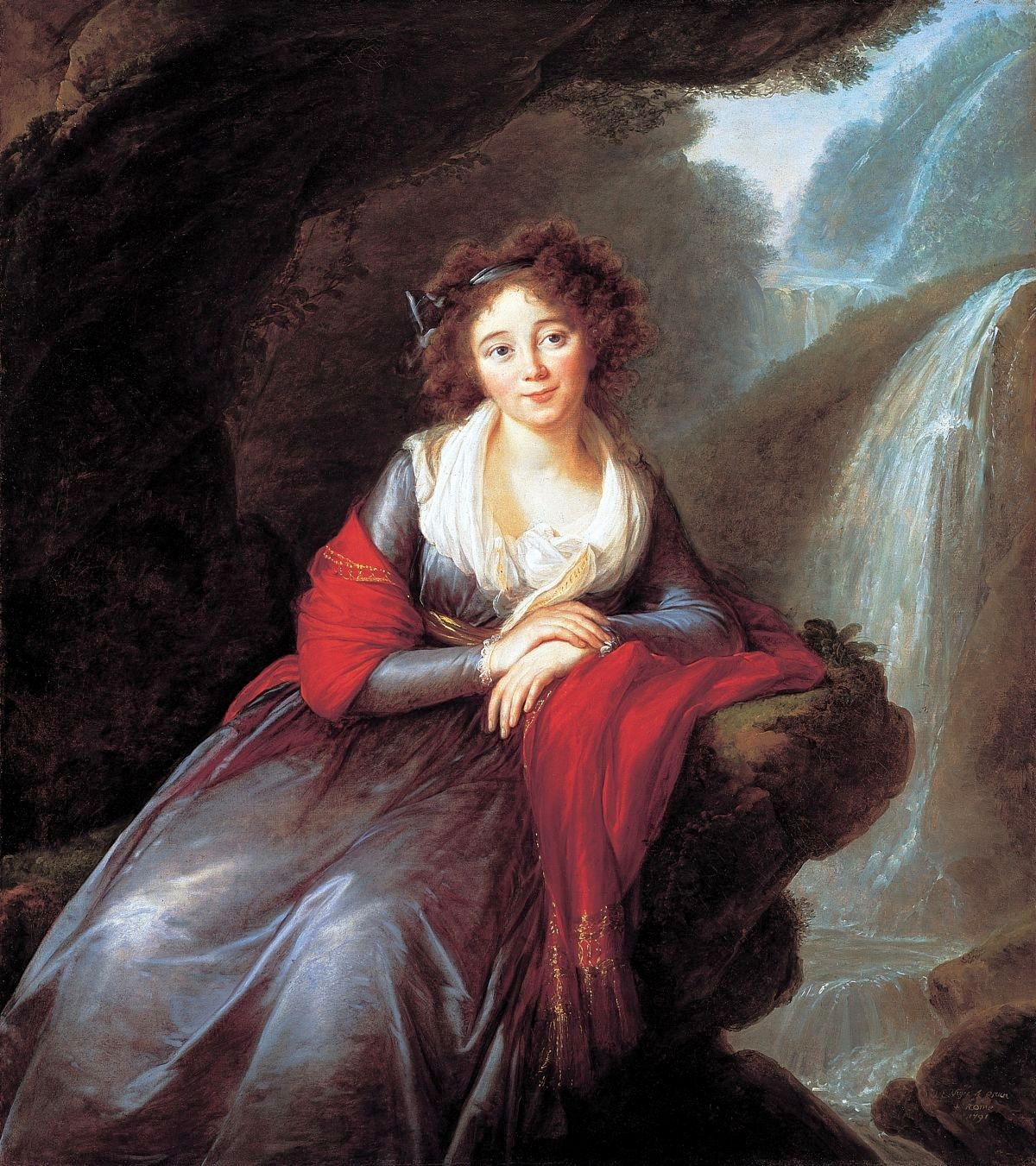
Countess Potocka, Private collection.

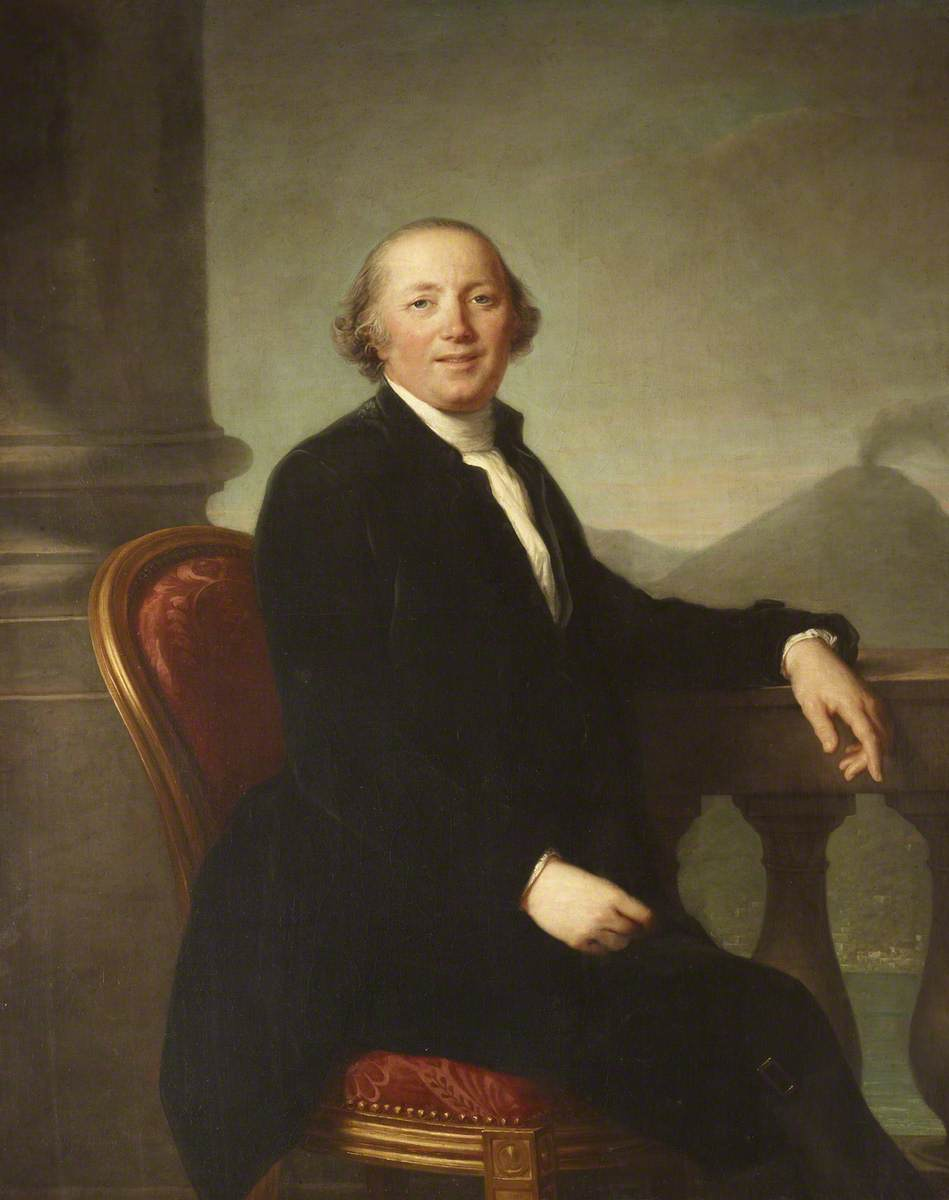
Lord Bristol, 1790, National Trust collection.

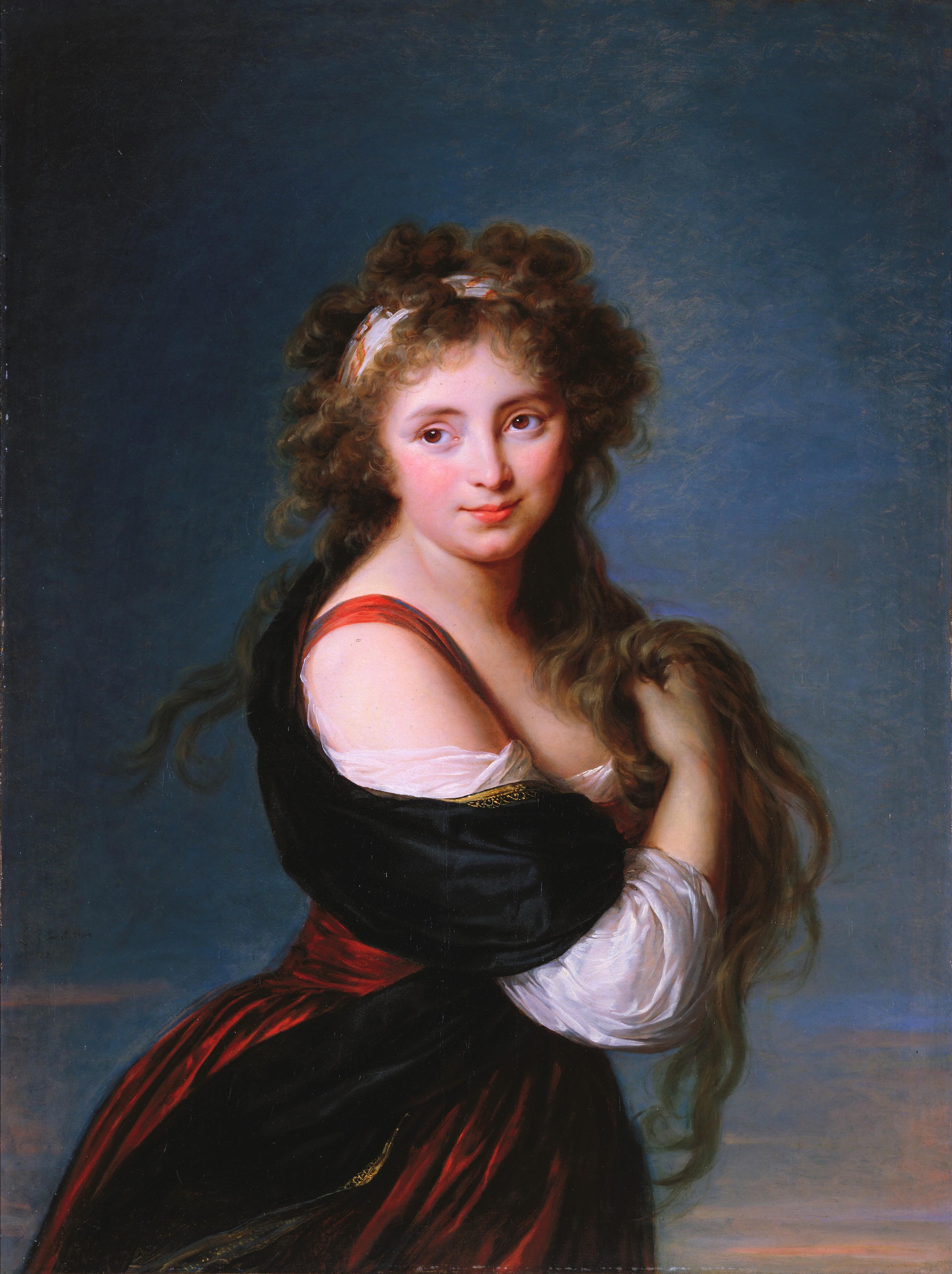
Portrait of Hyacinthe Gabrielle Roland, 1791

=== Portraits painted in Austria ===
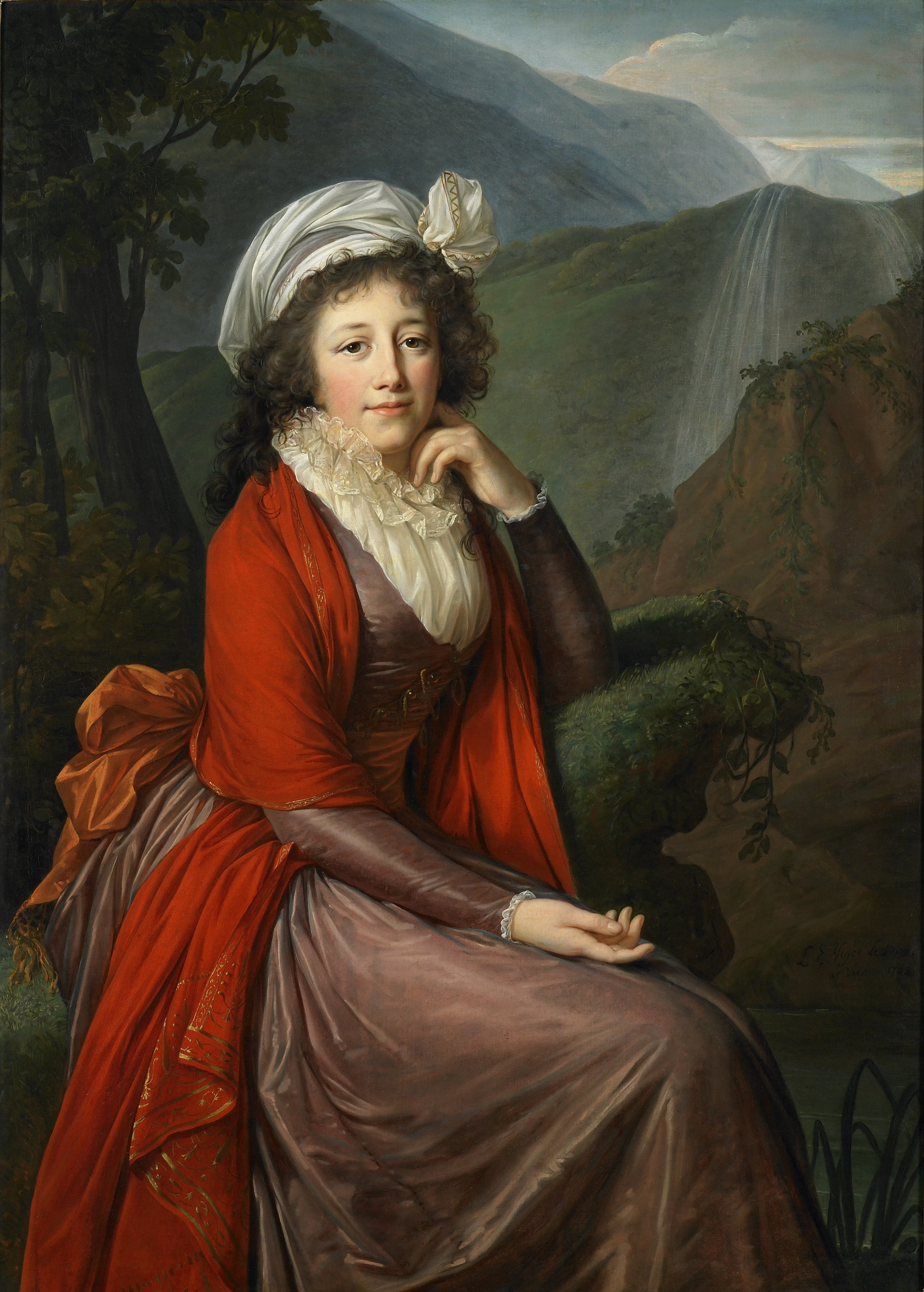
La Comtesse Maria Theresia Bucquoi, 1793, Minneapolis Institute of Art.

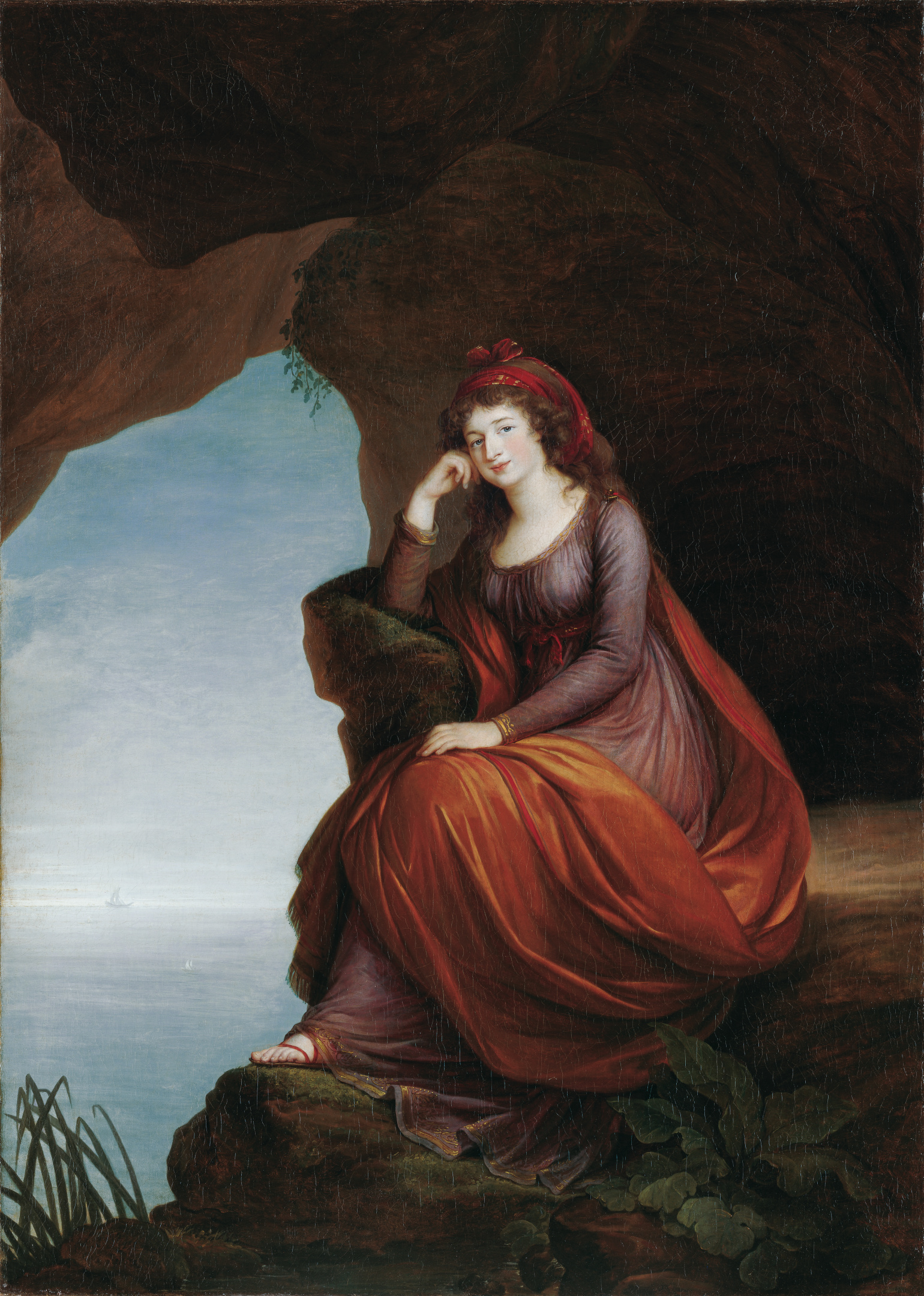
Princess Maria Josefa Hermenegilde von Esterhazy, 1793, Liechtenstein Museum.

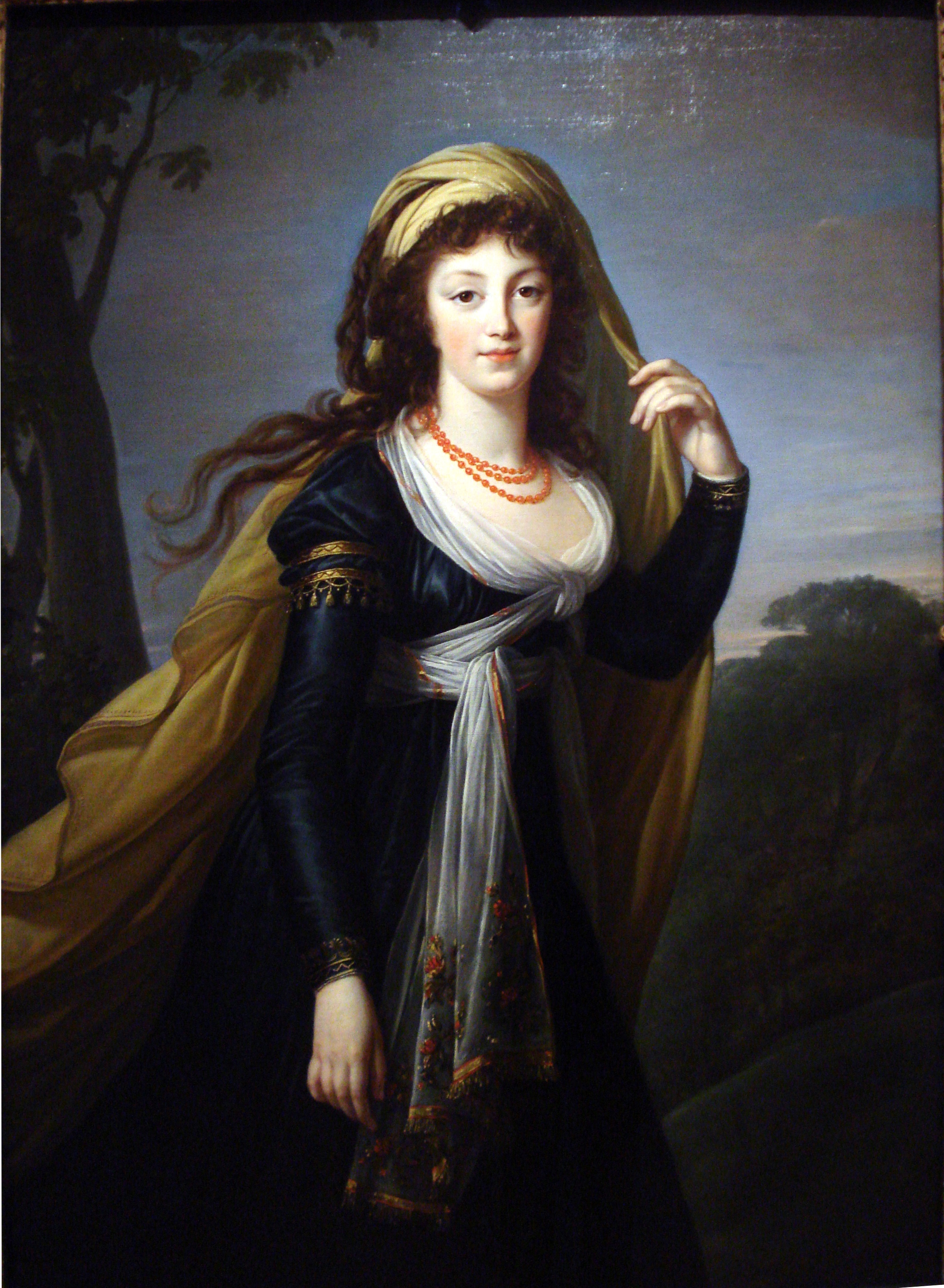
Theresa, Countess Kinsky, 1793, Norton Simon Museum.

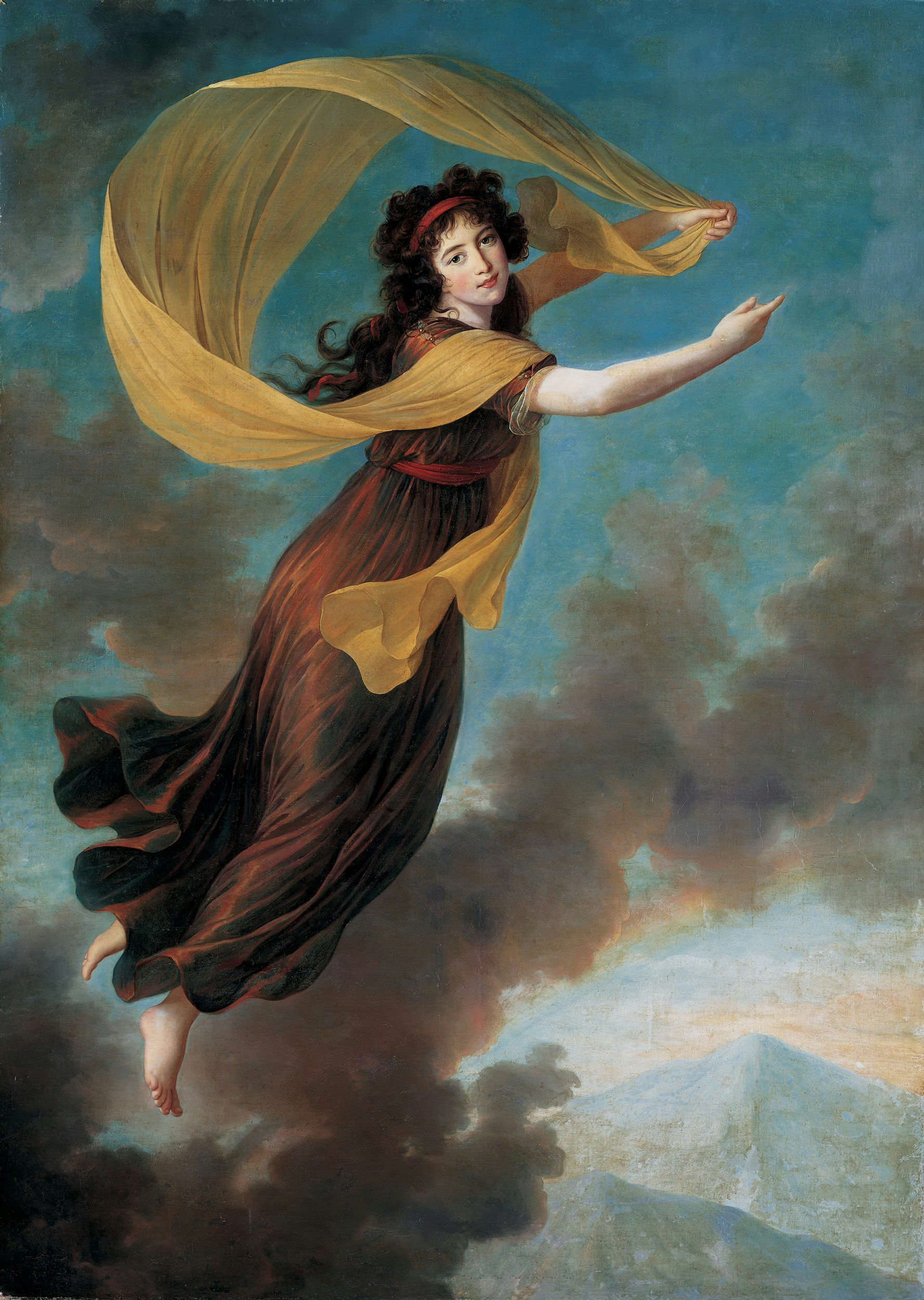
Princess Karoline of Liechtenstein, 1793, Liechtenstein Museum.

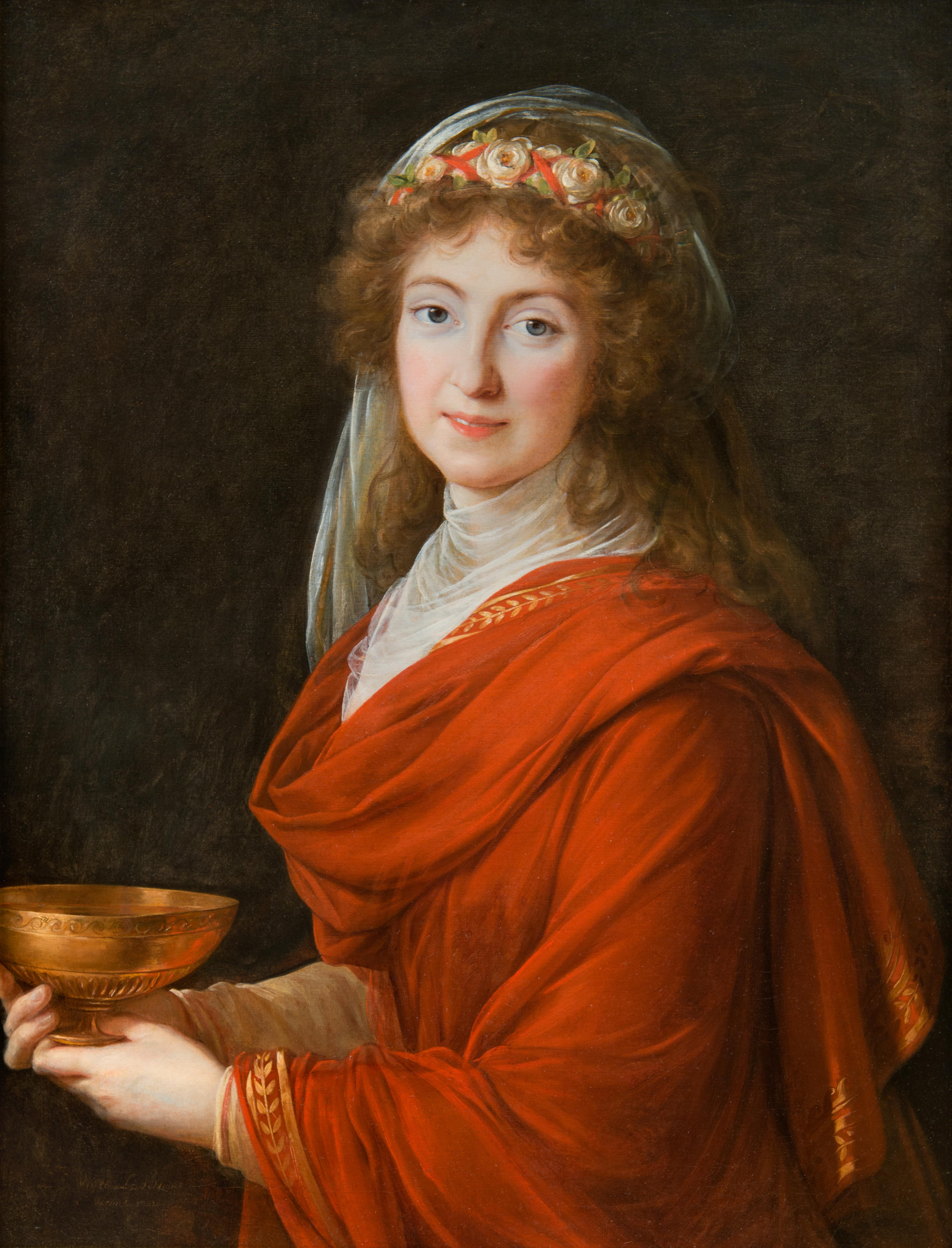
Countess Siemontkowsky-Bystry, 1793, Private collection.

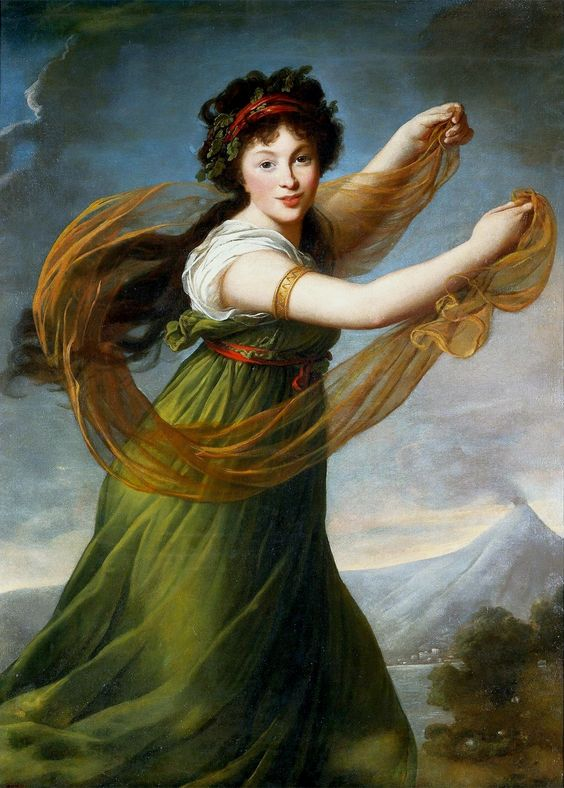
Pélagie Sapieżyna-Potocka, 1794, Royal Castle, Warsaw.

Portrait of Countess Maria Theresia Czernin, 1793, Brooklyn Museum

=== Portraits painted in Prussia and Russia ===
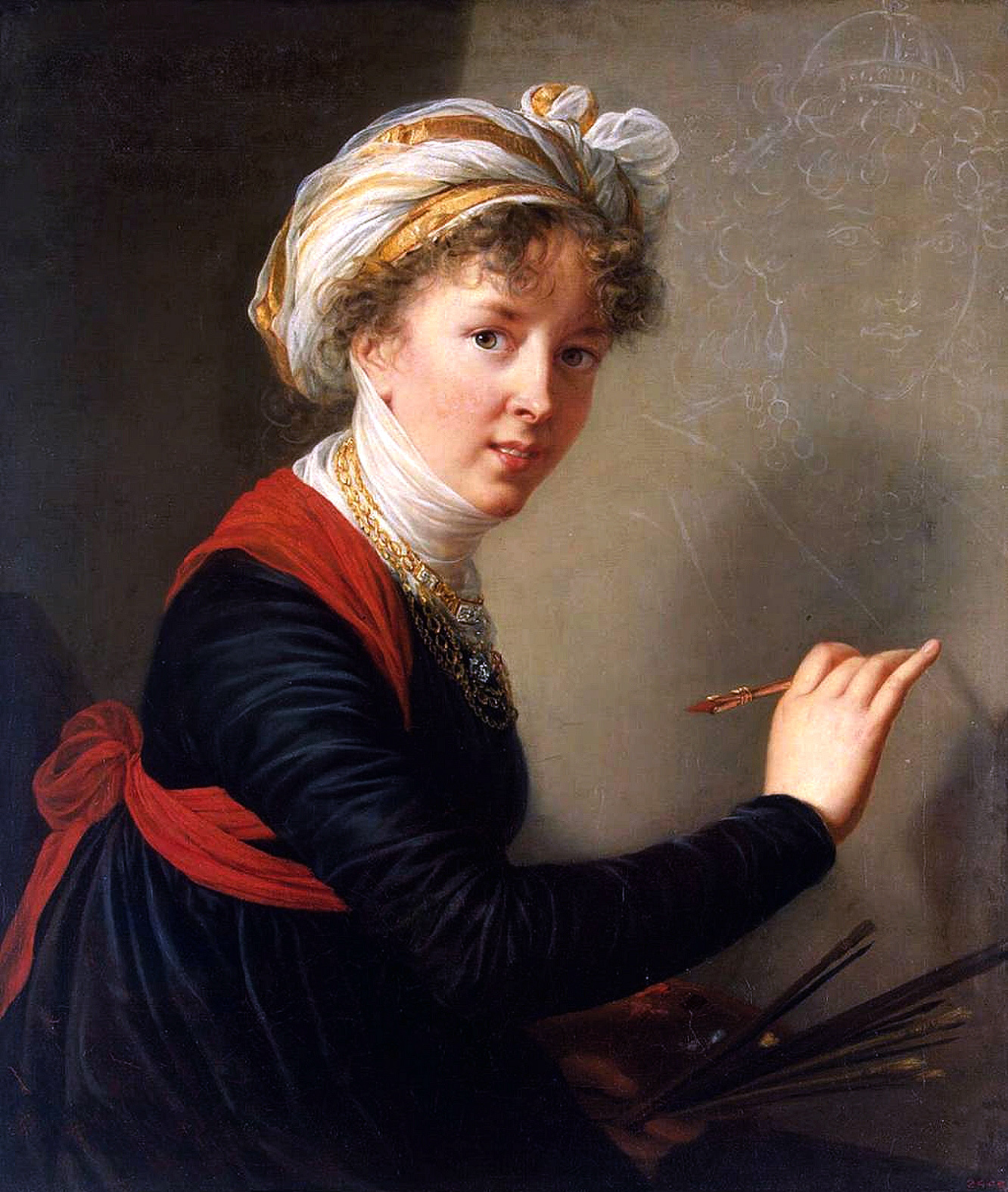
Self-portrait of herself painting Louise of Baden submitted for her admission to the Saint Petersburg Academy of Arts, now in the Hermitage Museum. Along with the other Uffizi portrait, are the only surviving self-portraits by the artist showing her in the act of painting.

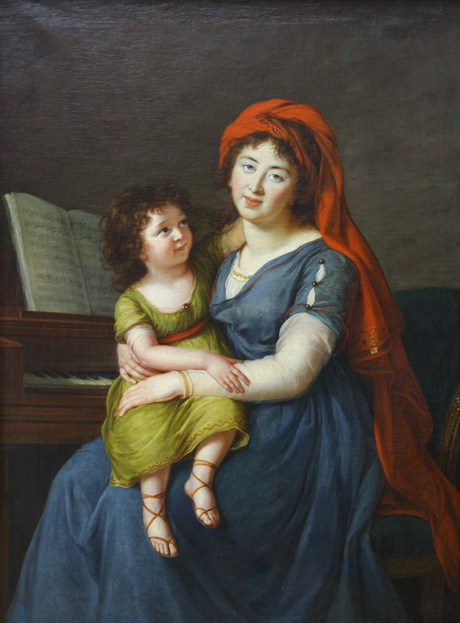
Princess Ekaterina Nikolaevna Menshikova, 1795, National Gallery of Armenia.

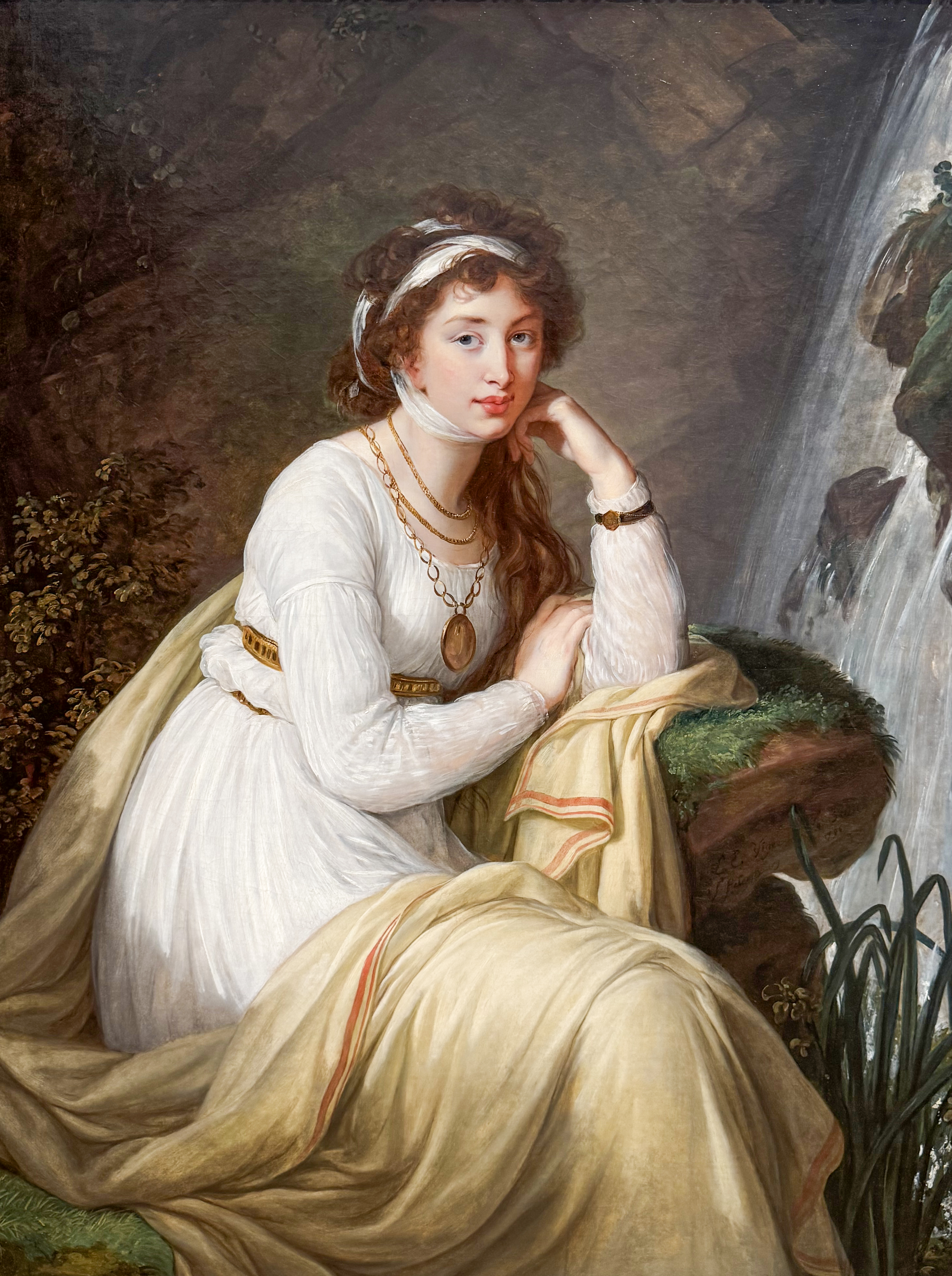
Anna Ivanovna Baryatinskaya Tolstoy, 1796, National Gallery of Canada.

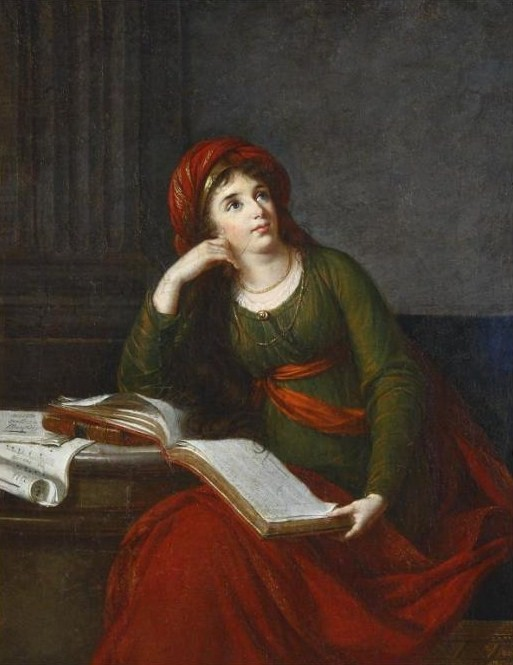
Ekaterina Feodorovna Baryatinskaya-Dolgorukova, 1796, Yamazaki Mazak Museum of Art.

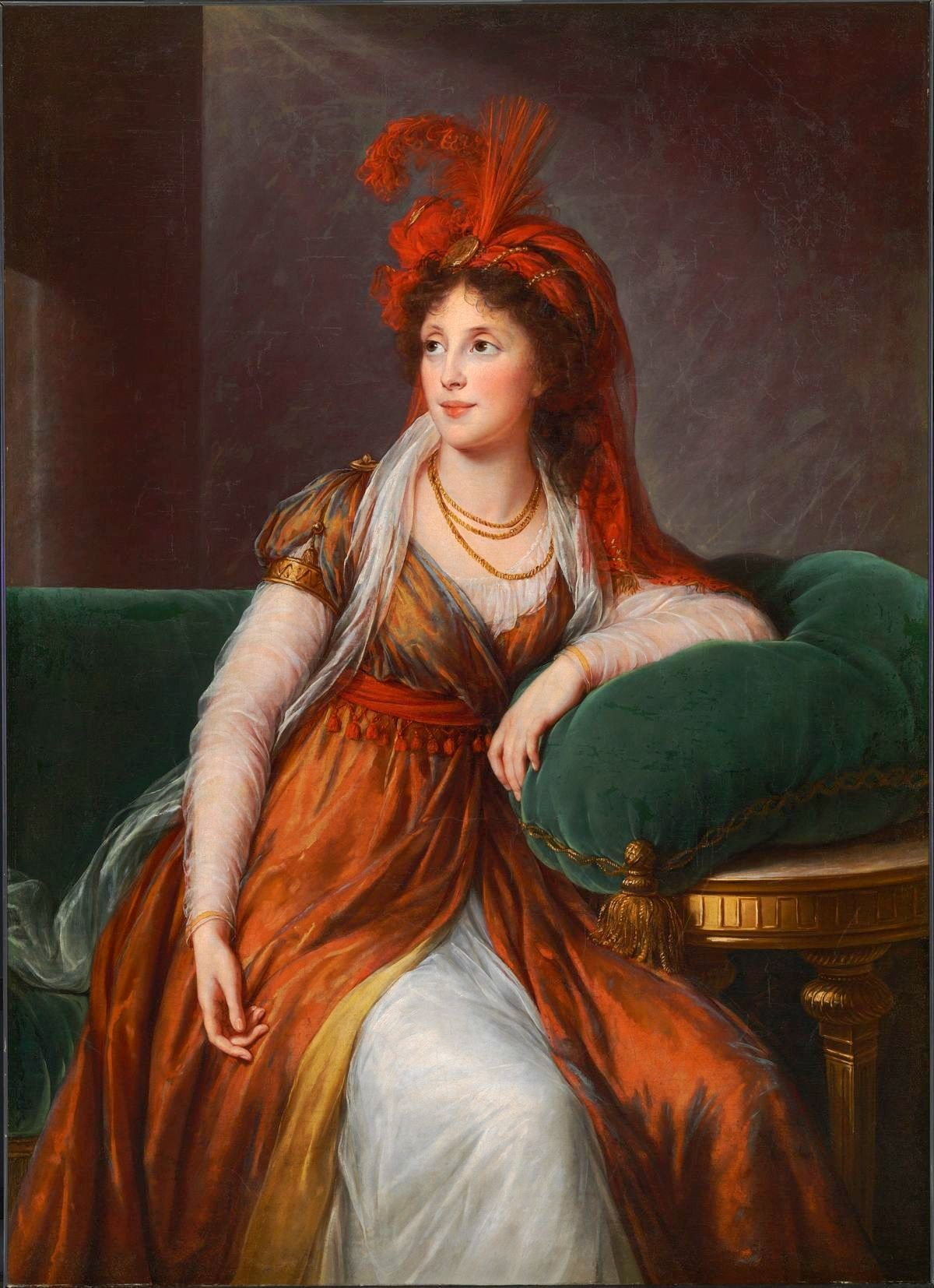
Princess Ana Gruzinsky Galitzine, 1797, Baltimore Museum of Art.

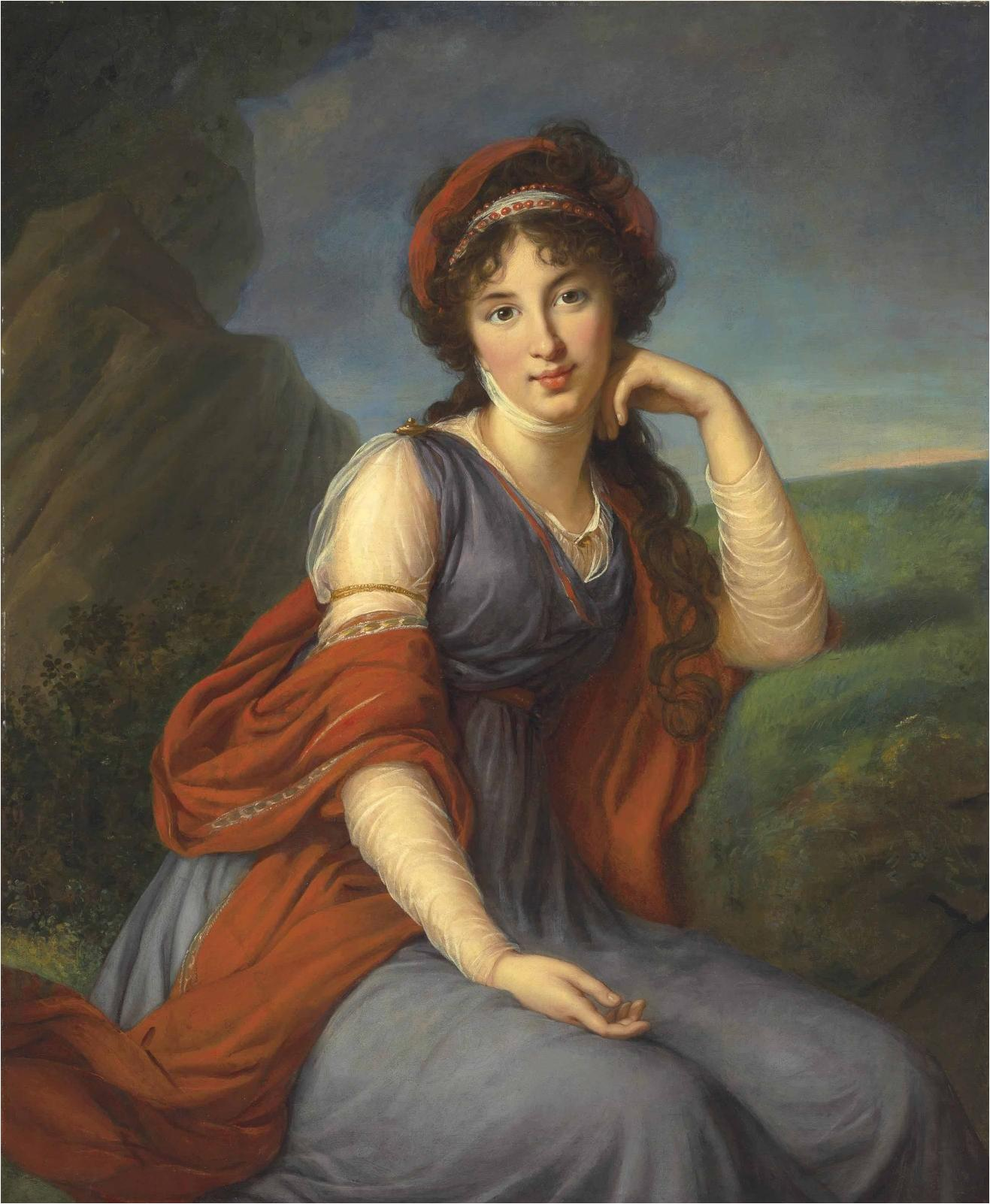
Princess Golitsyna, 1797, (Maria Razumovskaya).

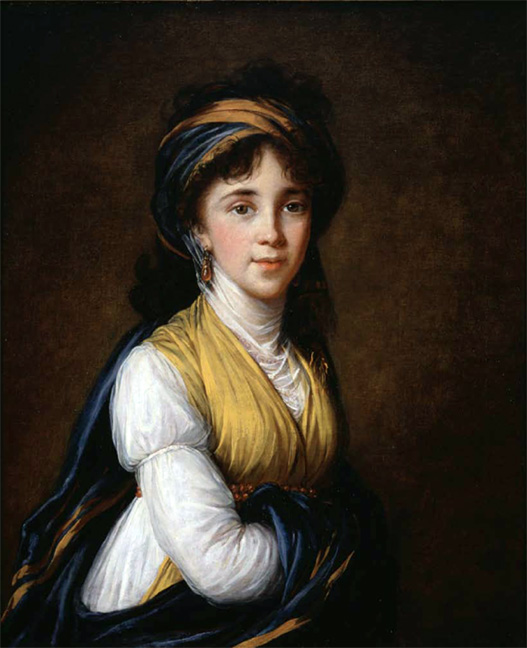
Anna Beloselskaya-Belozerskaya, 1798, National Museum of Women in the Arts.

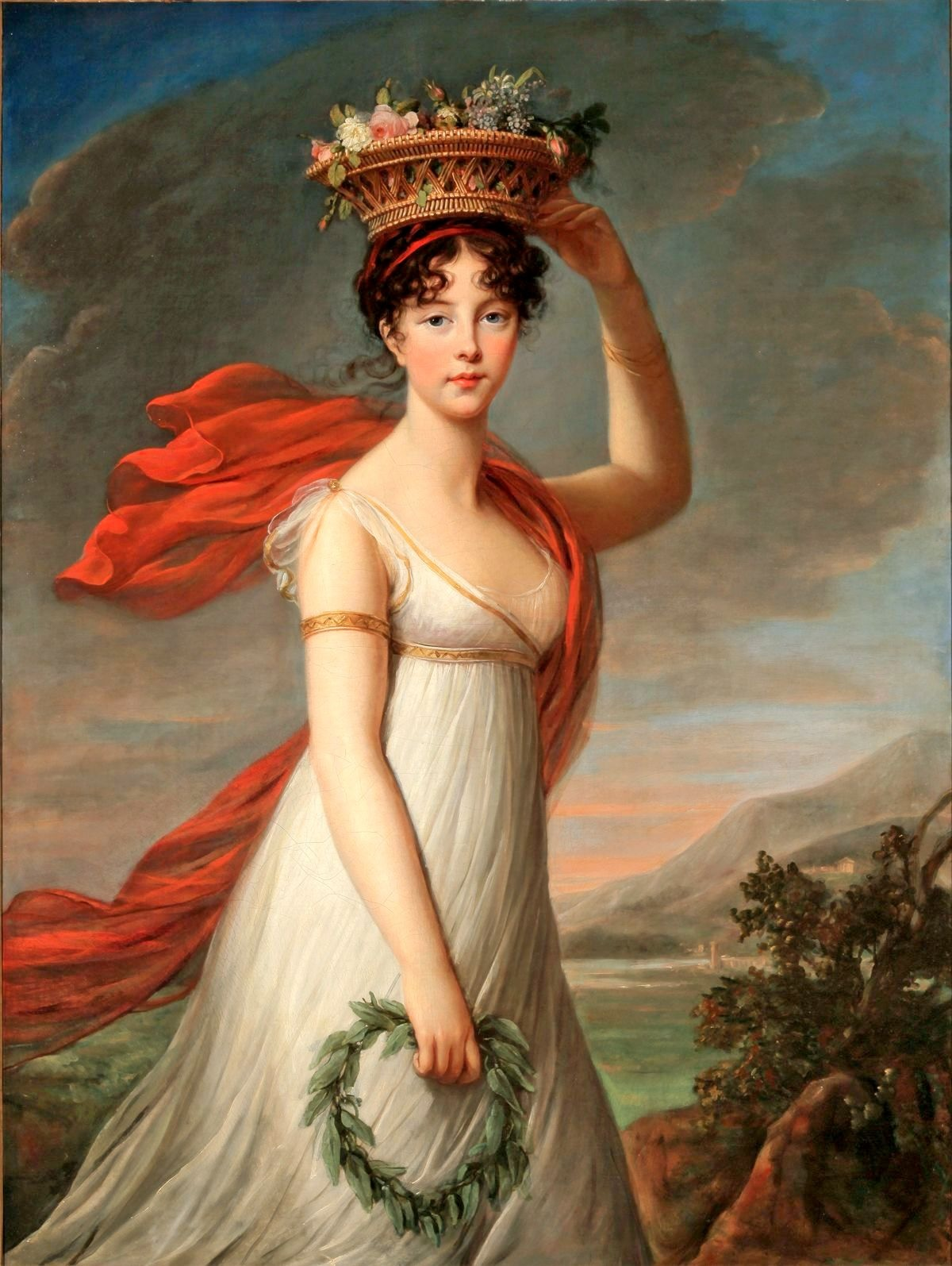
Julie Le Brun as Flora, 1799, Museum of Fine Arts (St. Petersburg, Florida).

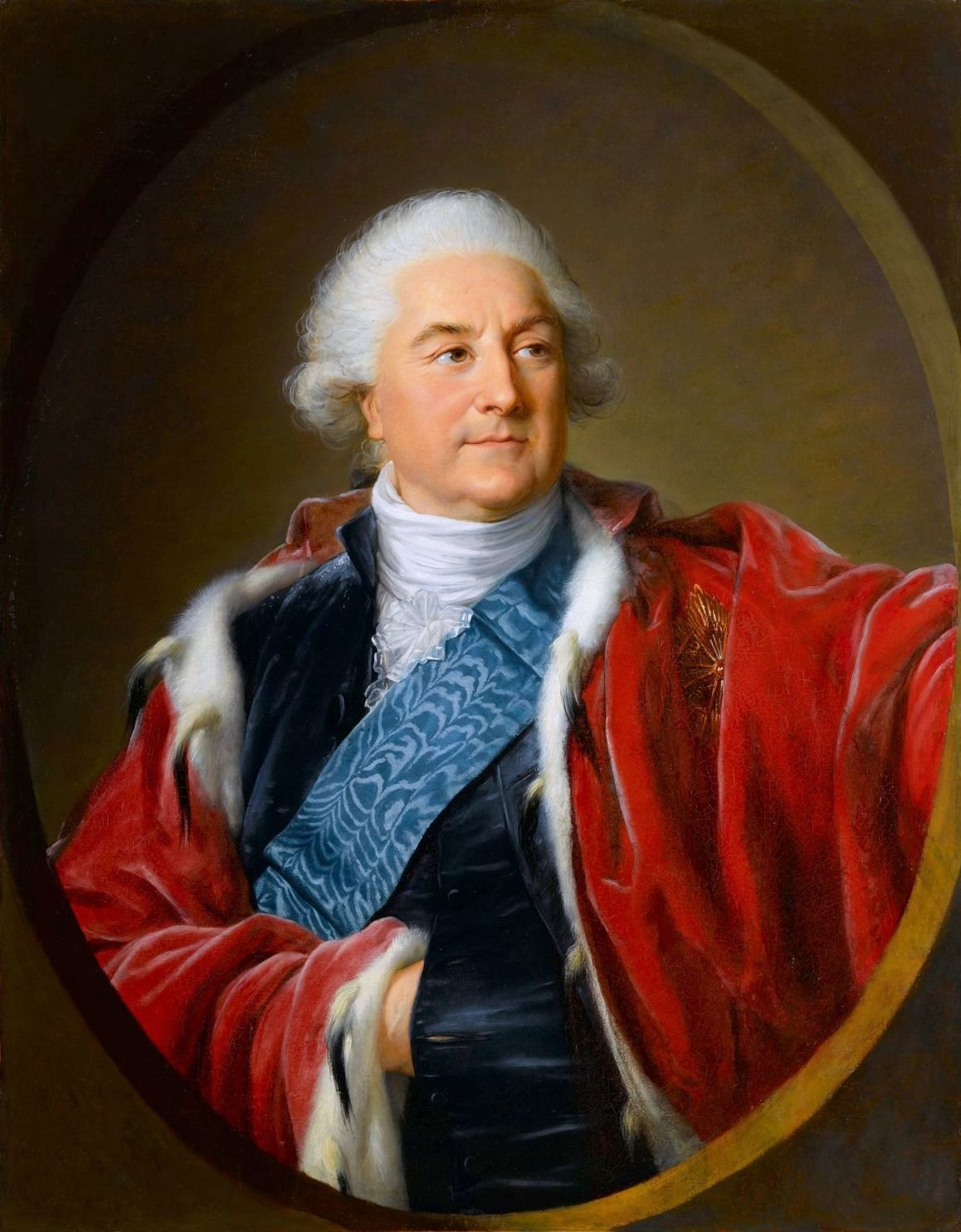
Stanislaus Augustus Poniatowski, former King of Poland, 1796, Versailles Collection.

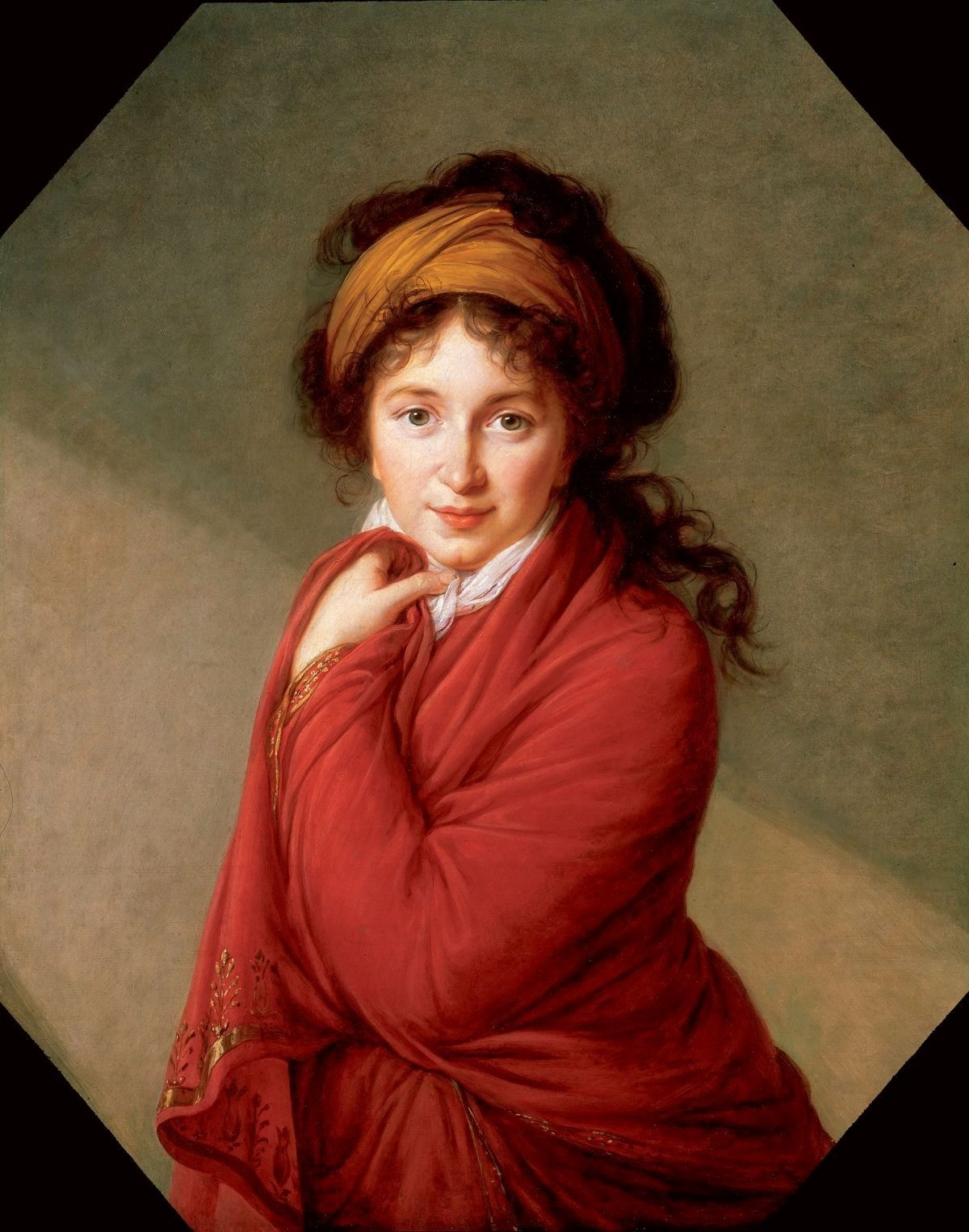
Portrait of Countess Golovina, c.1800, Barber Institute of Fine Arts.

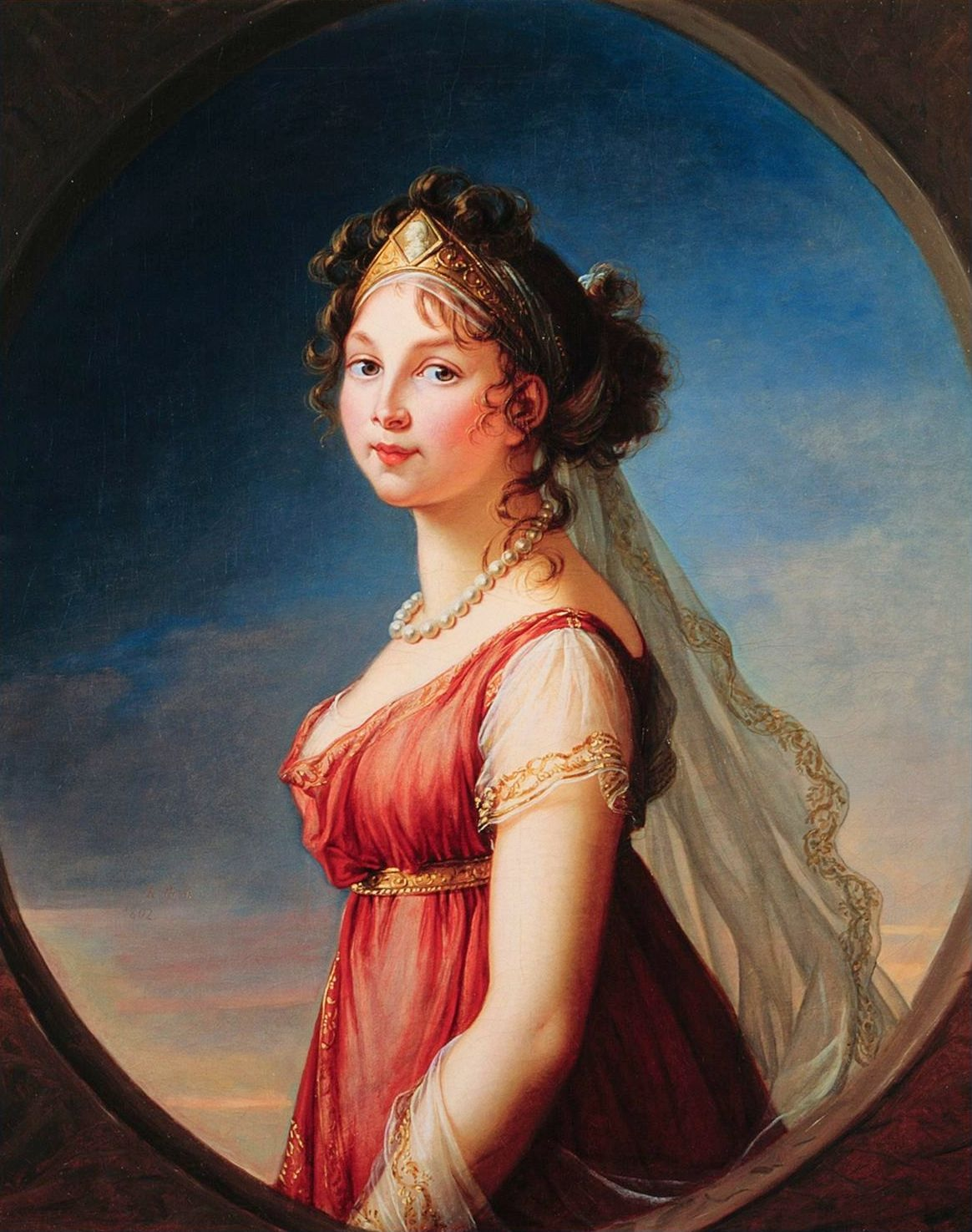
Portrait of Louise of Mecklenburg-Strelitz, 1802

== See also ==
- Marie-Victoire Lemoine
- Women artists

== Literature and resources ==
- University of Pennsylvania, Memoirs of Madame Élisabeth Vigée Le Brun, Translated by Lionel Strachey, Copyright 1903, by Doubleday, Page & Company, Published, October 1903.
