= Belisarius Begging for Alms =

Painting by Jacques-Louis David

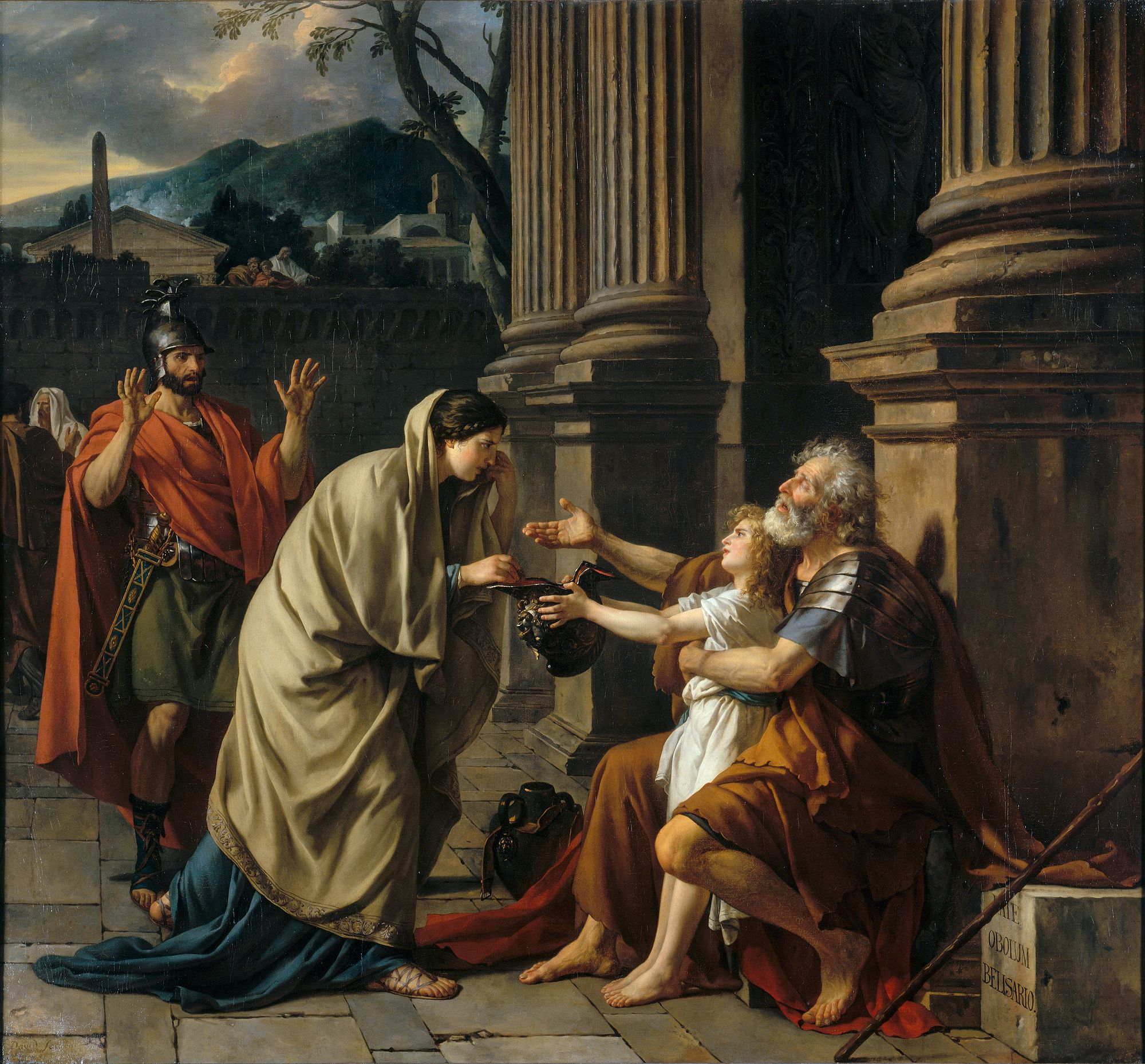
- Artist: Jacques-Louis David
- Year: 1781
- Medium: oil on canvas
- Dimensions: 288 cm × 312 cm (113 in × 123 in)
- Location: Palais des Beaux-Arts, Lille

Belisarius Begging for Alms (French: Bélisaire demandant l'aumône, lit. 'Belisarius asking for alms') is a large-format (288 × 312 cm) history painting in oil on canvas by the French artist Jacques-Louis David. It depicts the Byzantine general Belisarius, who heroically defeated the Vandals in North Africa in AD 533–534 on behalf of Justinian I, and (according to an apocryphal account probably added to his biography in the Middle Ages) was later blinded by the emperor and reduced to begging for alms on the street. David exhibited the work at the Salon of 1781 at the Louvre after returning from Italy and it proved a great success.

It is now in the Palais des Beaux-Arts in Lille. A second, reduced version was displayed at the Salon of 1785 and is now in the collection of the Louvre.

== Themes ==
The theme of mercy is omnipresent in the work, focusing on the three people considered most "based": the woman, the child and the old man who embodies the image of Mercy. The hands of these three individuals horizontally convey the idea of weakness involving need and love. The soldier, meanwhile, in the background, lifts his hands vertically to show his astonishment, with his chest forward. The three human ages represented give an idea of the glory of youth and the wreck of old age.

By depicting a Roman general known for a fall from glory due to unjust leadership, David was able to openly criticize the current government without being silenced. Similar scenes borrowing from the past yet speaking to the present are visible in his later works as well, such as Oath of the Horatii. In addition to speaking in code through early neo-classical style and Greek/Roman myths, David played it safe politically by making sure all parties at the time could relate to the painting. His work navigated rococo and neoclassical styles, while painting his subject in an interpretably sympathetic light. The woman provides alms, a form of charity, which can be condescending or compassionate. Depending on one’s political position (fans or doubters of the new King), one could feel sorry for Belisarius, or see that he had been rightfully demoted. The painting also speaks to the themes of public duty and private grief, two contentious points within the good-of-the-many and good-of-the-few debates of the time.

The writer Jean-François Marmontel published a novel under the title Bélisaire in 1767, in which the exiled general delivers monologues denouncing the social evils eroding the vitality of the French state. The Emperor who originally ordered Belisarius to be blinded and dispossessed then comes to him, to listen to him again. This, and tense pre-revolution France, are the conditions into which David's painting is borne. By using Belisarius (and the novel of a ruler coming to his senses) as a reference, David managed to gather the support of both the dissenting patriots outside the corridors of power, and the reforming bureaucrats who were themselves isolated and on the defense within the government.

== Style ==
The same subject had already been used by Peyron in his own Belisarius receiving Hospitality from a Peasant; in contrast, only a few characters are present here and the scene is dependent on the story for dramatic effect. David shows us a fallen hero, old and blind, begging in the street with a young child when one of his former soldiers, astonished, recognises him.

The setting is Antique: sober, austere and overwhelming architecture is placed behind the depiction of harsh conditions. This shows that the artist wanted to associate Greek style with heroic themes in the context of the concerns of the artist's time.

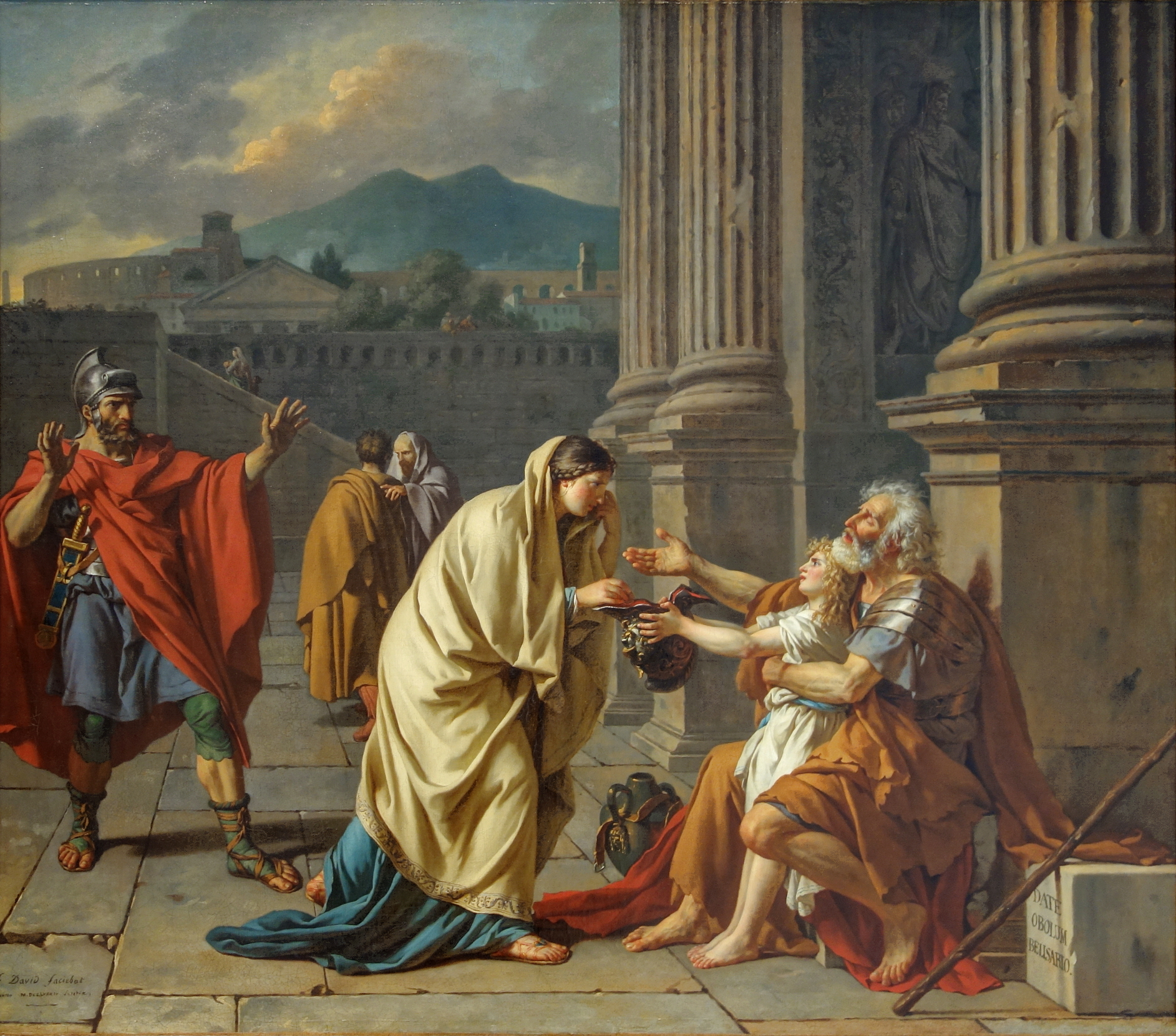
Belisarius Begging for Alms, 1784, 101 × 115 cm, Louvre

It is through the theme of virtues borrowed from ancient times that the "true style", later called neo-classical, spread into art, rejecting the frivolities of the royal court of Louis XVI at the time of the French Revolution. In the very composition of the work of David, however, the essence of the tableau juxtaposes several rococo ideas, and is thus not a completely neo-classical work. Nonetheless, the neo-classical perspective can still be found, especially in the ideas behind this painting: a revolutionary (David) offers a meditation on the moral heroism in adversity.

The artist returned to the subject in 1784, producing a smaller canvas with minor changes which is in the collection of the Louvre.

== See also ==
- List of paintings by Jacques-Louis David
