= Portrait of Charles Alexandre de Calonne =

Painting by Élisabeth Vigée Le Brun

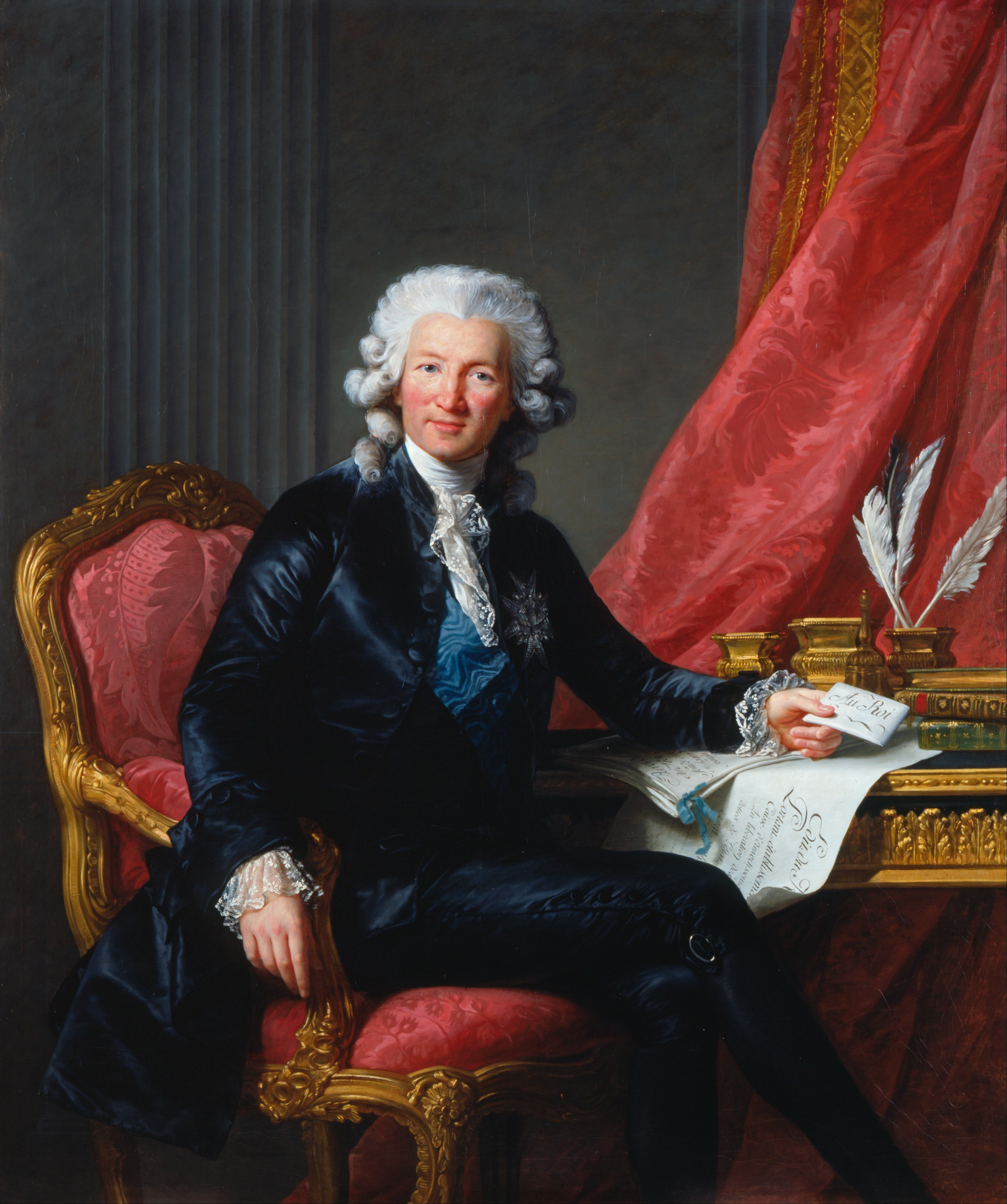
- Artist: Élisabeth Vigée Le Brun
- Year: 1784
- Type: Oil on canvas, portrait painting
- Dimensions: 155.5 cm × 130.3 cm (61.2 in × 51.3 in)
- Location: Royal Collection

Portrait of Charles Alexandre de Calonne is a 1784 portrait painting by the French artist Élisabeth Vigée Le Brun. It depicts the politician Charles Alexandre de Calonne, best known for serving as Controller-General of Finances between 1783 and 1787 during the reign of Louis XVI. His attempts to reform public spending ended in his dismissal, precipitating the French Revolution he is shown wearing the Order of the Holy Spirit and guiding a letter assessed to the king.

Vigée Le Brun was one of the most celebrated portraitists during the final years of the Ancien régime, known in particular for her depictions of the French queen Marie Antoinette. Gossip suggested that she was a lover of de Calonne, which she strongly denied. It was displayed at the Salon of 1785 at the Louvre in Paris, one of ten paintings she exhibited that year.

The work was commissioned by the sitter who took it with him for Britain when he went there in exile after his dismissal. The painting was acquired by George, Prince of Wales and remains in the Royal Collection today.

== Bibliography ==
- Baillio, Joseph & Baetjer, Katharine & Lang, Paul. Vigée Le Brun. Metropolitan Museum of Art, 2016.
- Helm, W.H. Elisabeth Louise Vigée-Lebrun. Parkstone International, 2018.
- May, Gita. Elisabeth Vigee Le Brun: The Odyssey of an Artist in an Age of Revolution. Yale University Press, 2008.
- Sheriff, Mary D. The Exceptional Woman: Elisabeth Vigee-Lebrun and the Cultural Politics of Art. University of Chicago Press, 1997.
