= Portrait of Joseph-Marie Vien =

Painting by Joseph Duplessis

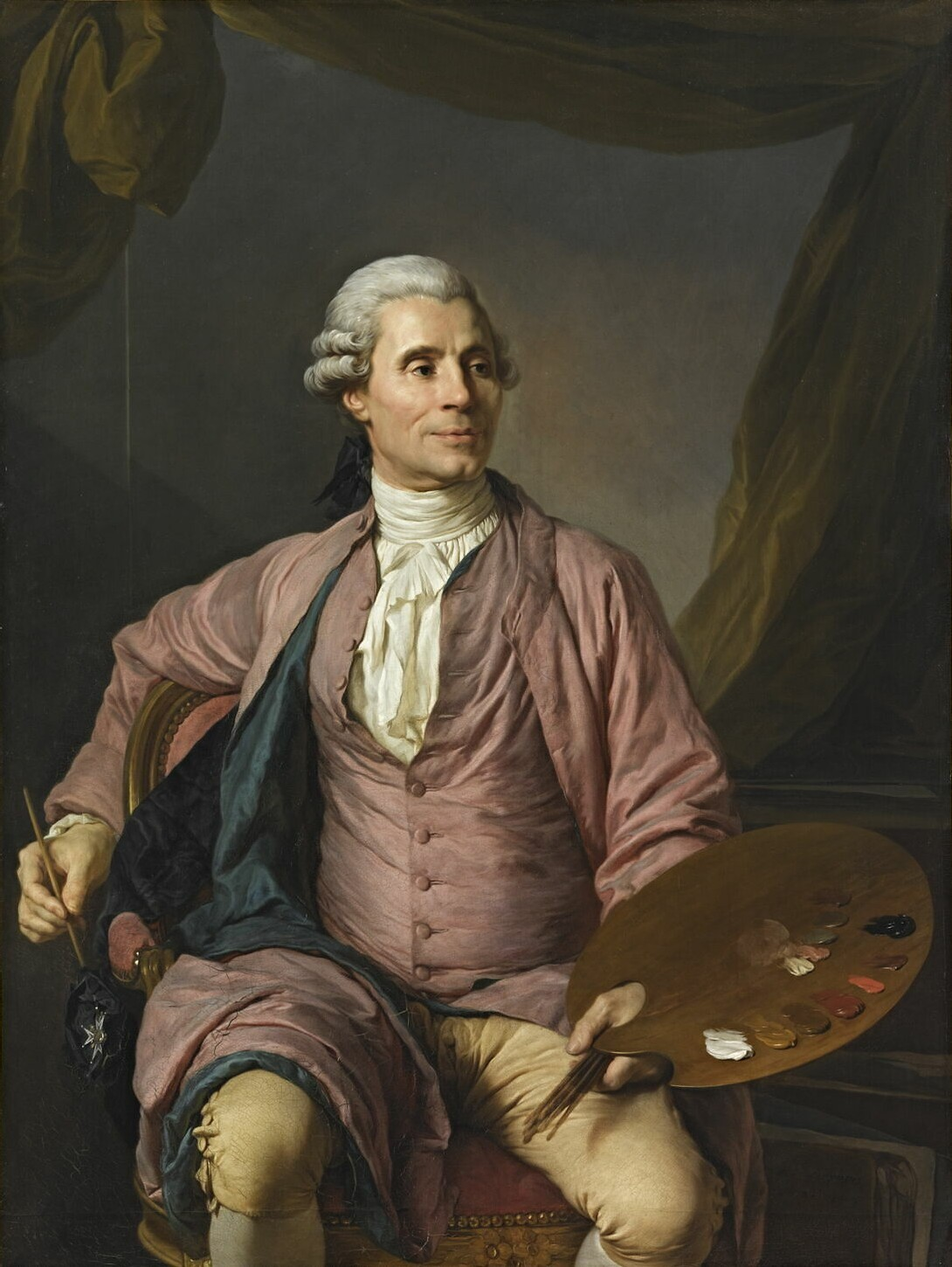
- Artist: Joseph Duplessis
- Year: 1784
- Type: Oil on canvas, portrait painting
- Dimensions: 133 cm × 100 cm (52 in × 39 in)
- Location: Louvre, Paris

Portrait of Joseph-Marie Vien is an oil on canvas portrait painting by the French artist Joseph Duplessis, from 1784. It depicts his fellow artist, the Neoclassical painter Joseph-Marie Vien. Vien is shown seated with an palette and paintbrush to indicate his profession. Noted for his history paintings, he was an influential figure in French art and served as the last Premier peintre du Roi to Louis XVI. Jacques-Louis David had been one of his most prominent pupils. He also served as director of the prestigious French Academy in Rome.

It was produced by Duplessis as his diploma work when he became a member of the Royal Academy. The painting was exhibited at the Salon of 1785 at the Louvre in Paris.

== Bibliography ==
- Gross, Hanns. Rome in the Age of Enlightenment: The Post-Tridentine Syndrome and the Ancien Régime. Cambridge University Press, 2004.
- Williams, Hannah. Académie Royale: A History in Portraits. Routledge, 2017.
