= Salon of 1785 =

1785 art exhibition in Paris

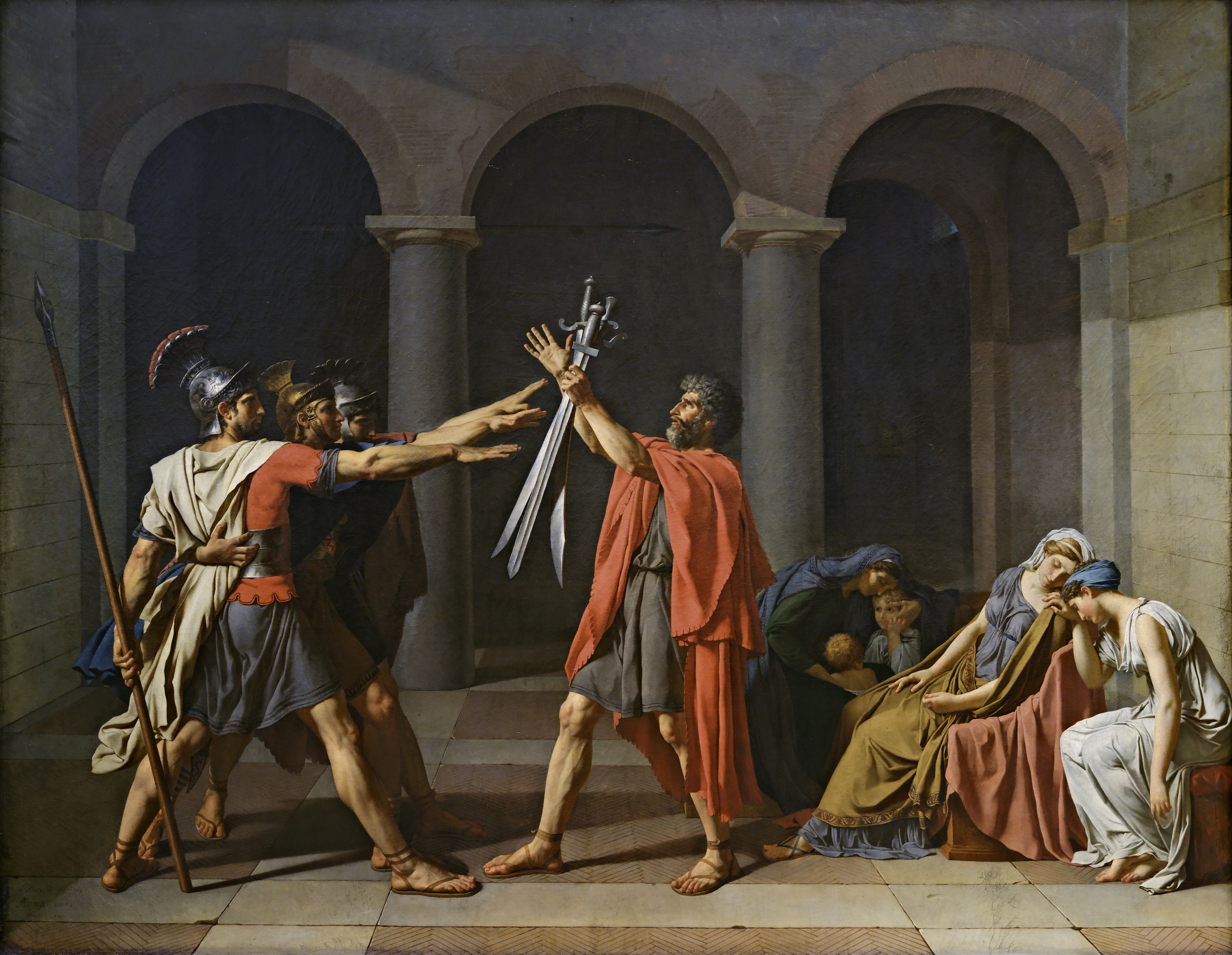
The Oath of the Horatii by Jacques-Louis David

The Salon of 1785 was an art exhibition held at the Louvre in Paris. It was organised by Académie Royale and opened on 25 August 1785, the feast day of Saint Louis as was common for the Salon during the Ancien Régime.

Jacques-Louis David's history painting The Oath of the Horatii was the sensation of the Salon. It features a scene from the early years of Rome. The painting's success at the Salon marked the complete victory of Neoclassicism over Rococo style which had dominated in previous decades.

David also displayed another classically themed work a version of his Belisarius Begging for Alms. In portraiture the Swedish painter Adolf Ulrik Wertmüller submitted a portrait of the sculptor Jean-Jacques Caffieri, his diploma work for admission to the French Royal Academy. In sculpture, Augustin Pajou presented a statue of the seventeenth century inventor and philosopher Blaise Pascal.

Louis-Jean-François Lagrenée displayed two neoclassical paintings. One of them featured a scene with Alexander the Great but it was the other based on the poem Jerusalem Delivered that received widespread praise from critics, one of whom described it as "perfect".

== Gallery ==
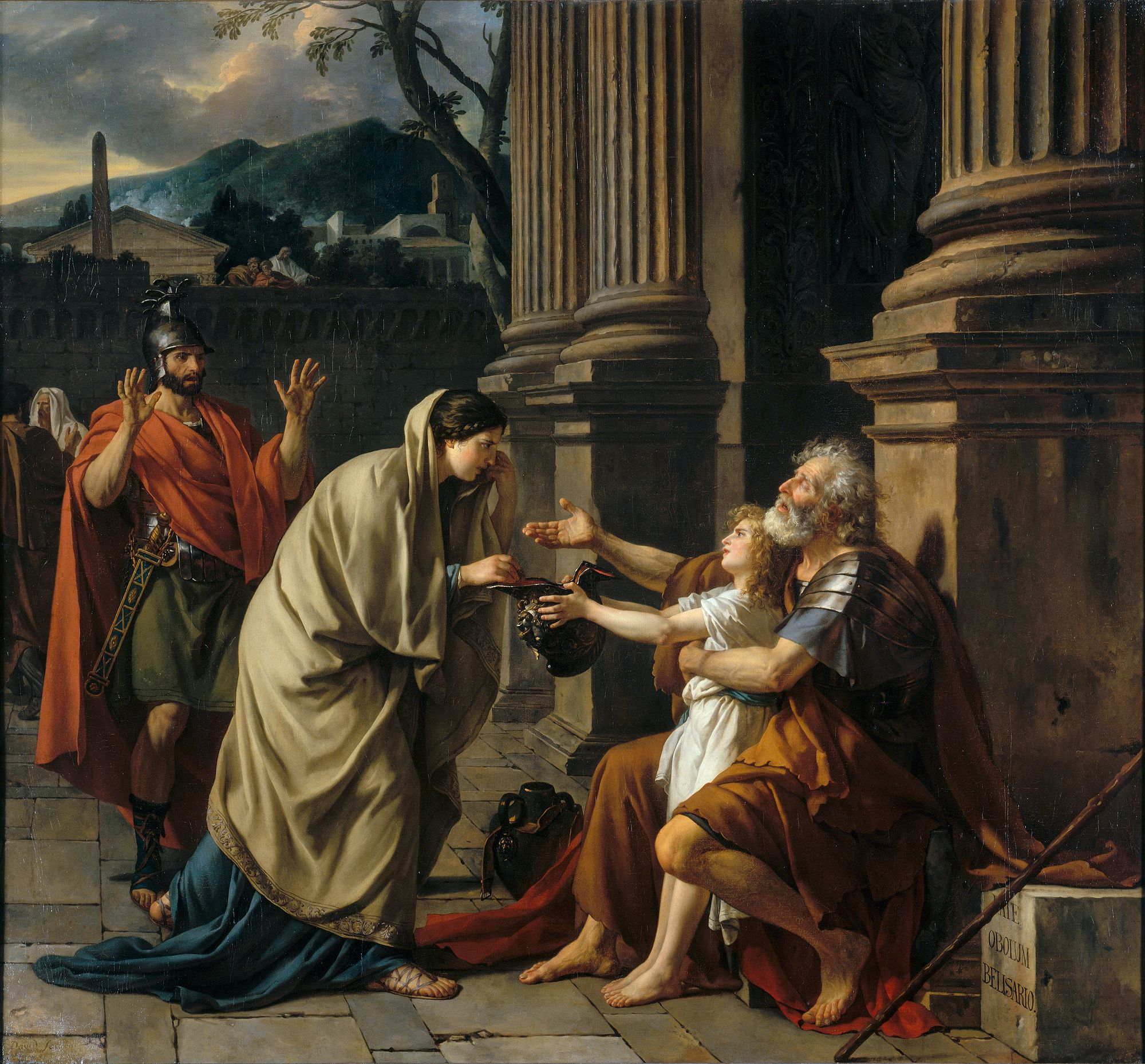
Belisarius Begging for Alms by Jacques-Louis David

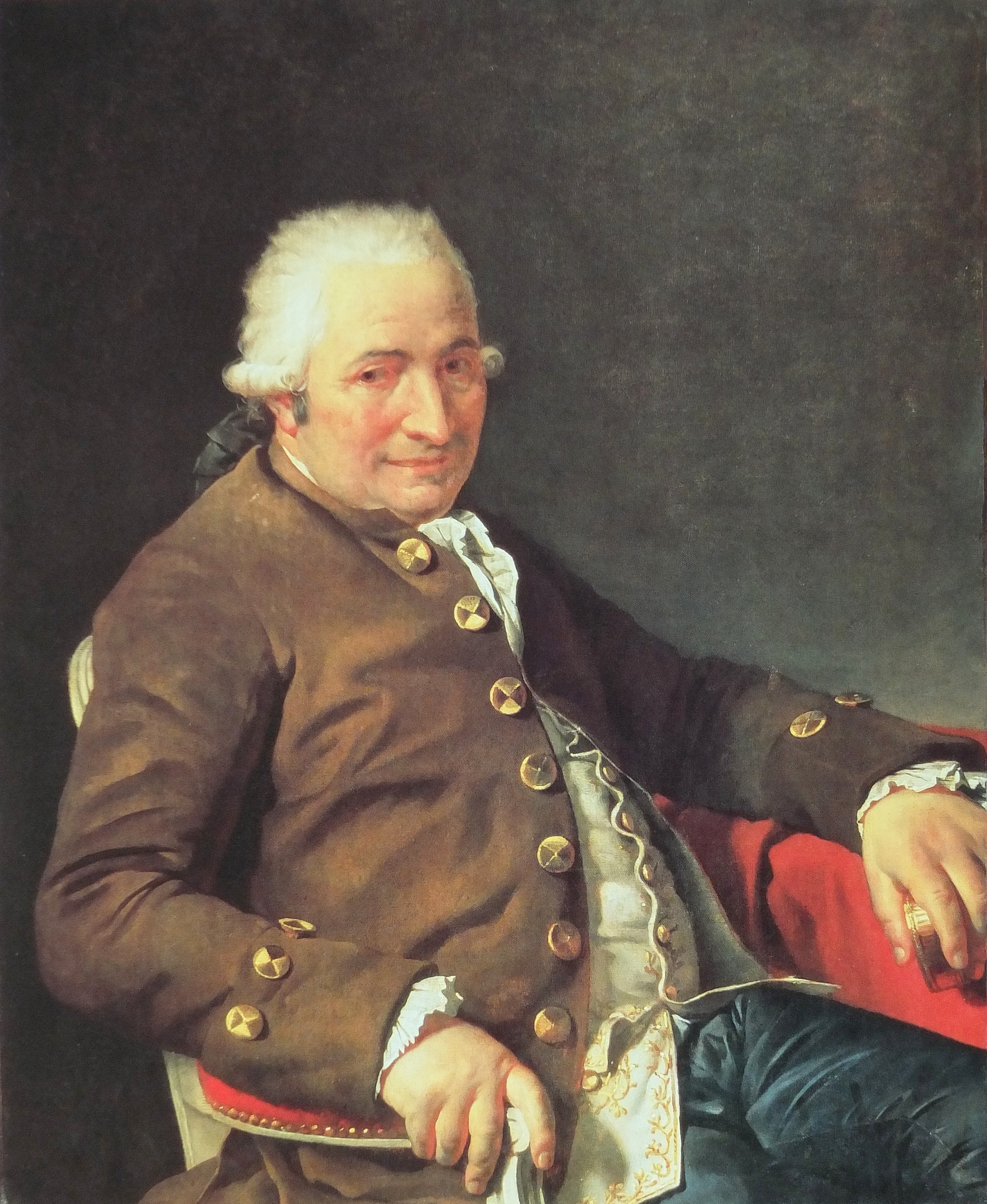
Portrait of Charles-Pierre Pécoul by Jacques-Louis David

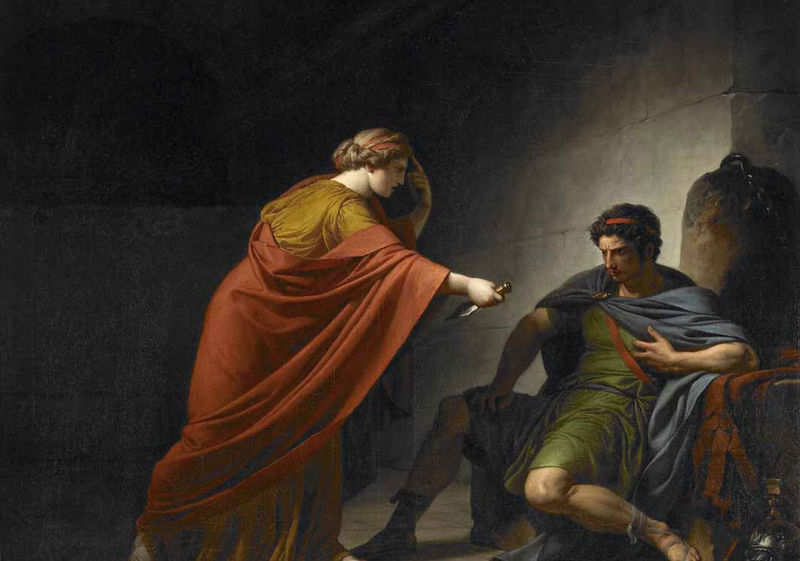
Arria and Paetus by François-André Vincent

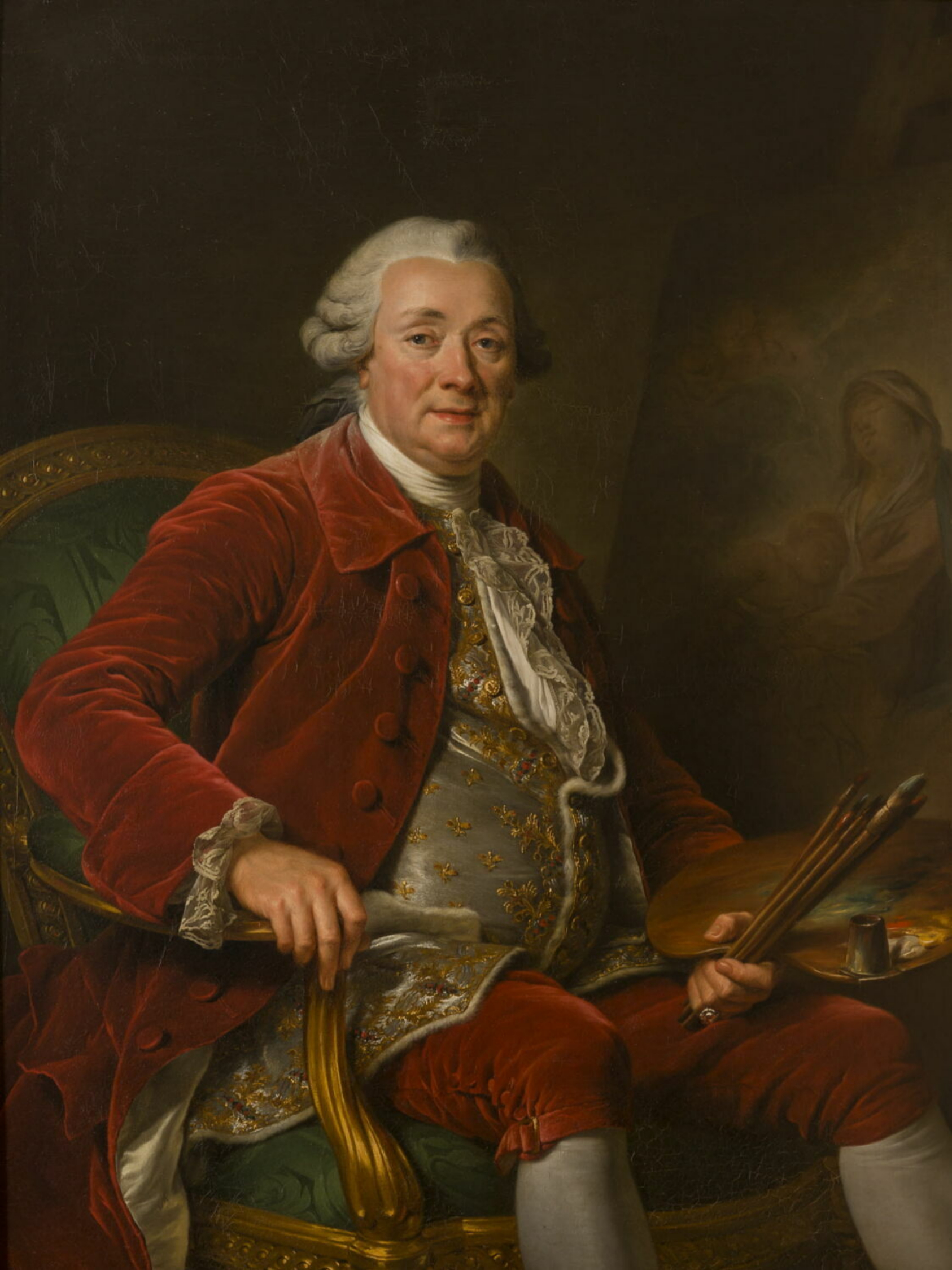
Portrait of Charles-Amédée-Philippe van Loo by Adélaïde Labille-Guiard

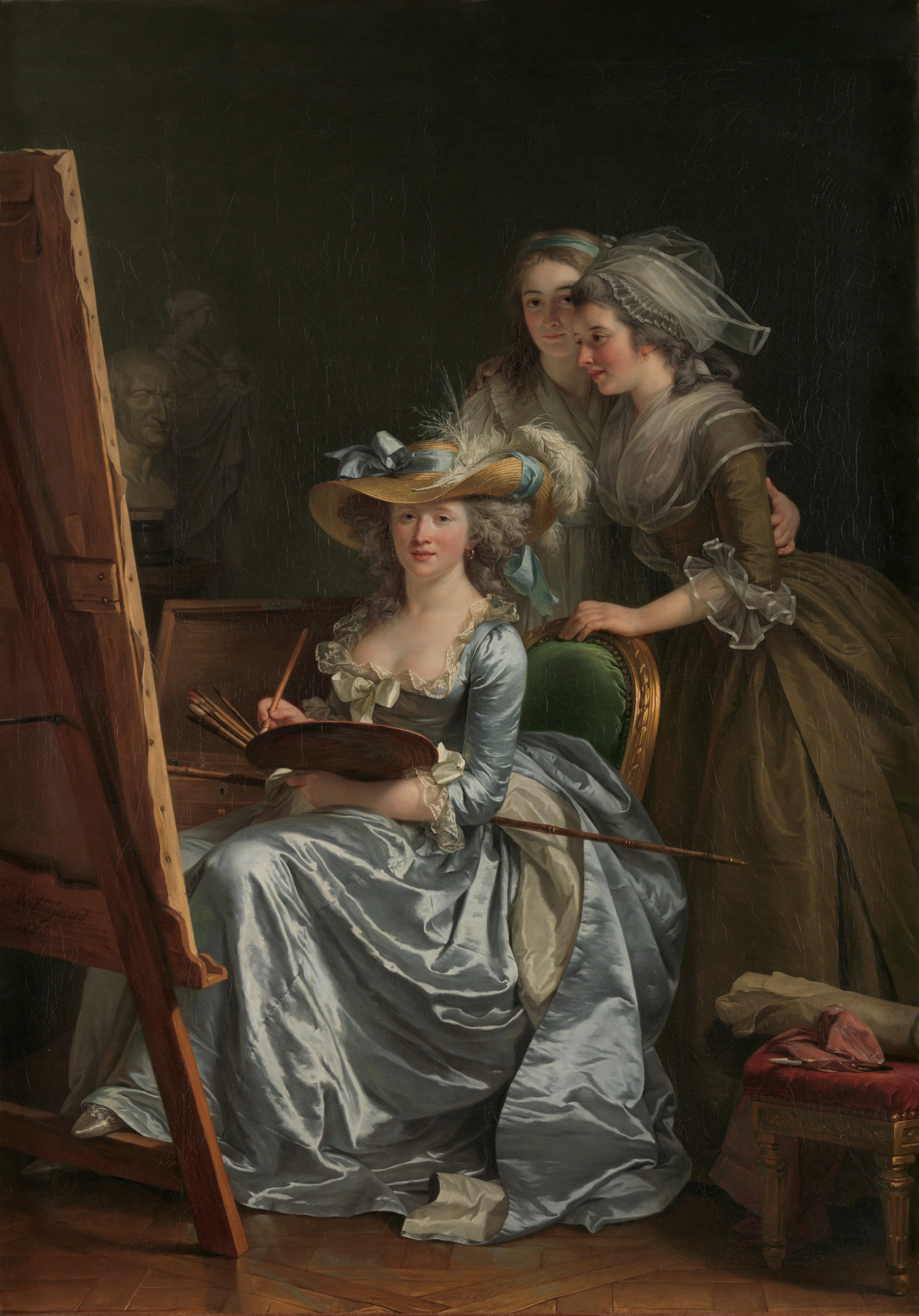
Self-Portrait with Two Pupils by Adélaïde Labille-Guiard

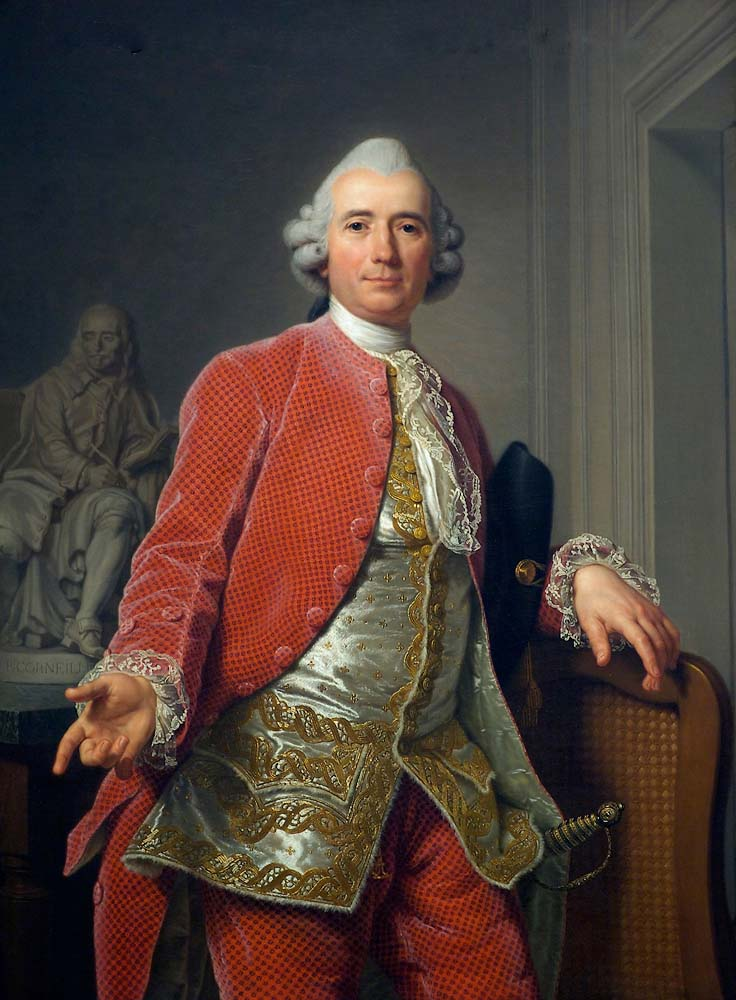
Portrait of Jean-Jacques Caffieri by Adolf Ulrik Wertmüller

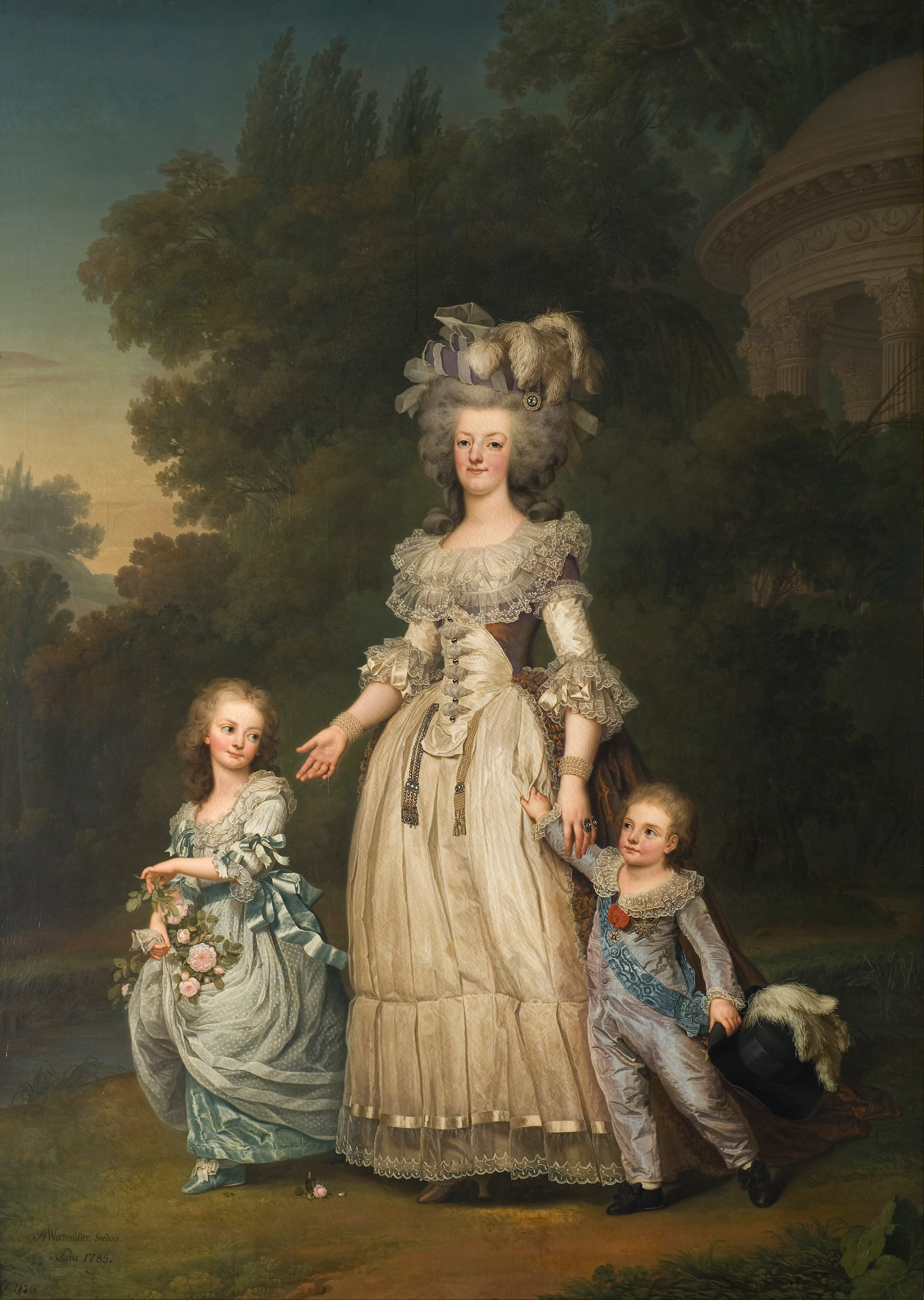
Marie Antoinette and Two of Her Children by Adolf Ulrik Wertmüller

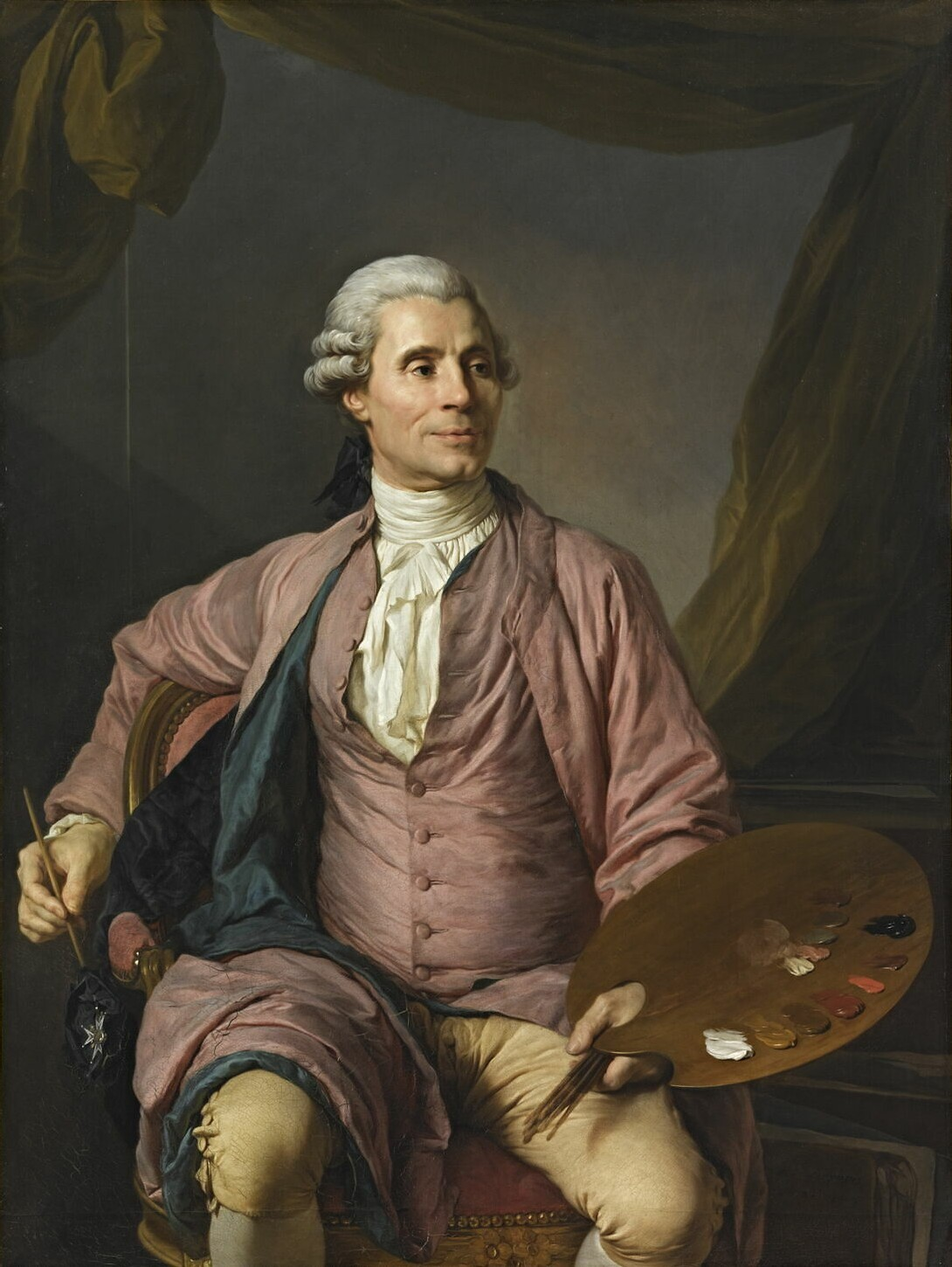
Portrait of Joseph-Marie Vien by Joseph Duplessis

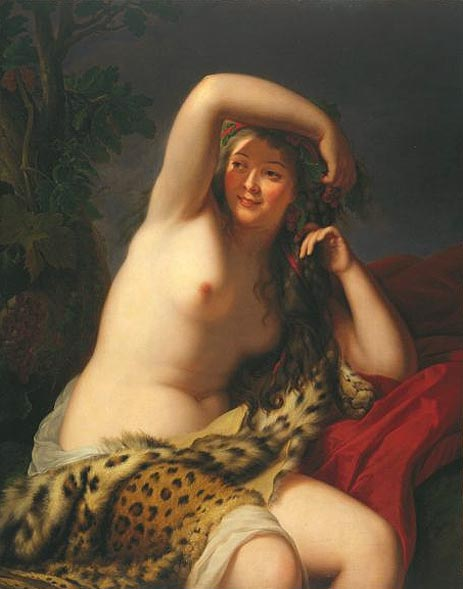
Bacchante by Élisabeth Vigée Le Brun

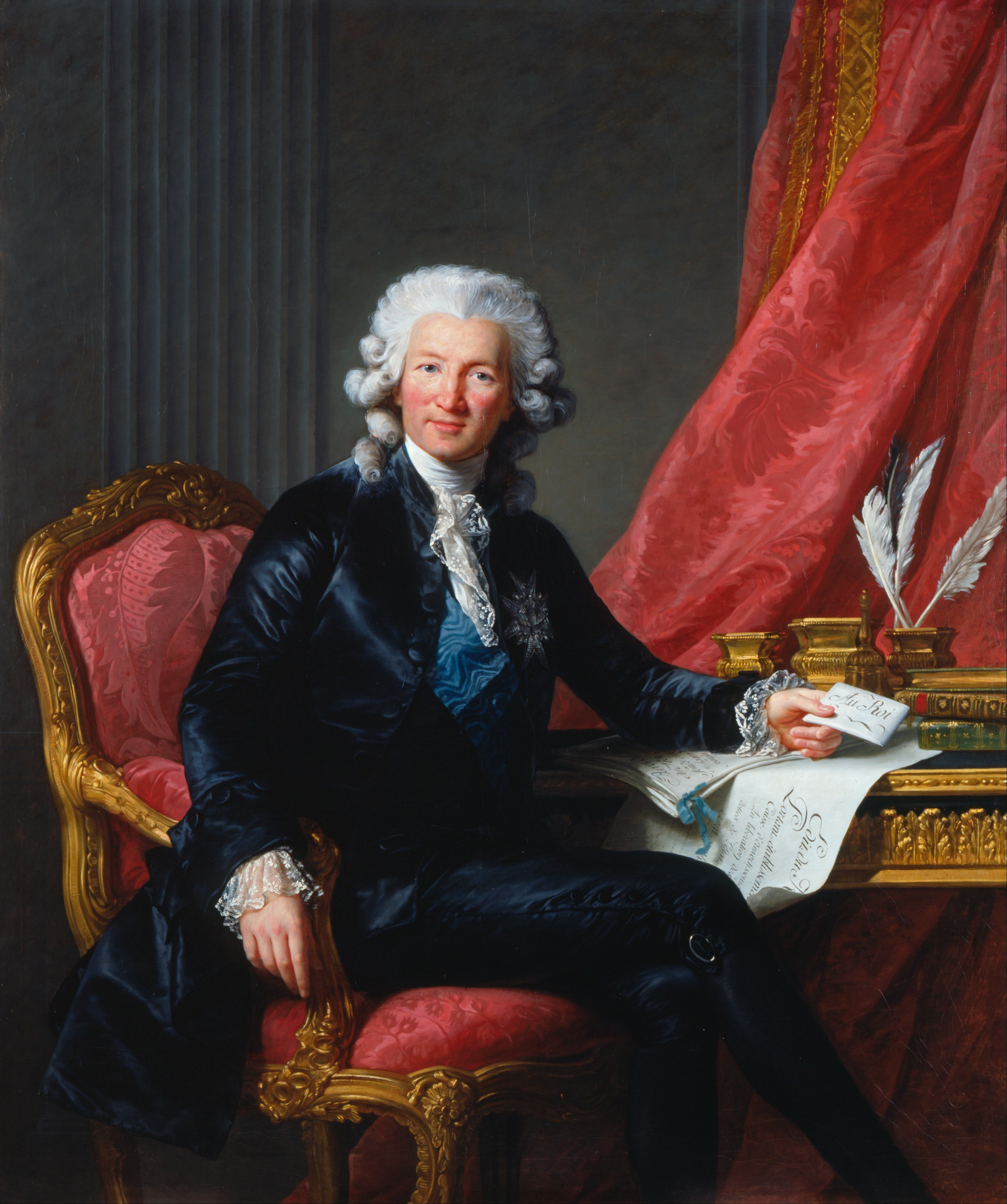
Portrait of Charles Alexandre de Calonne by Élisabeth Vigée Le Brun

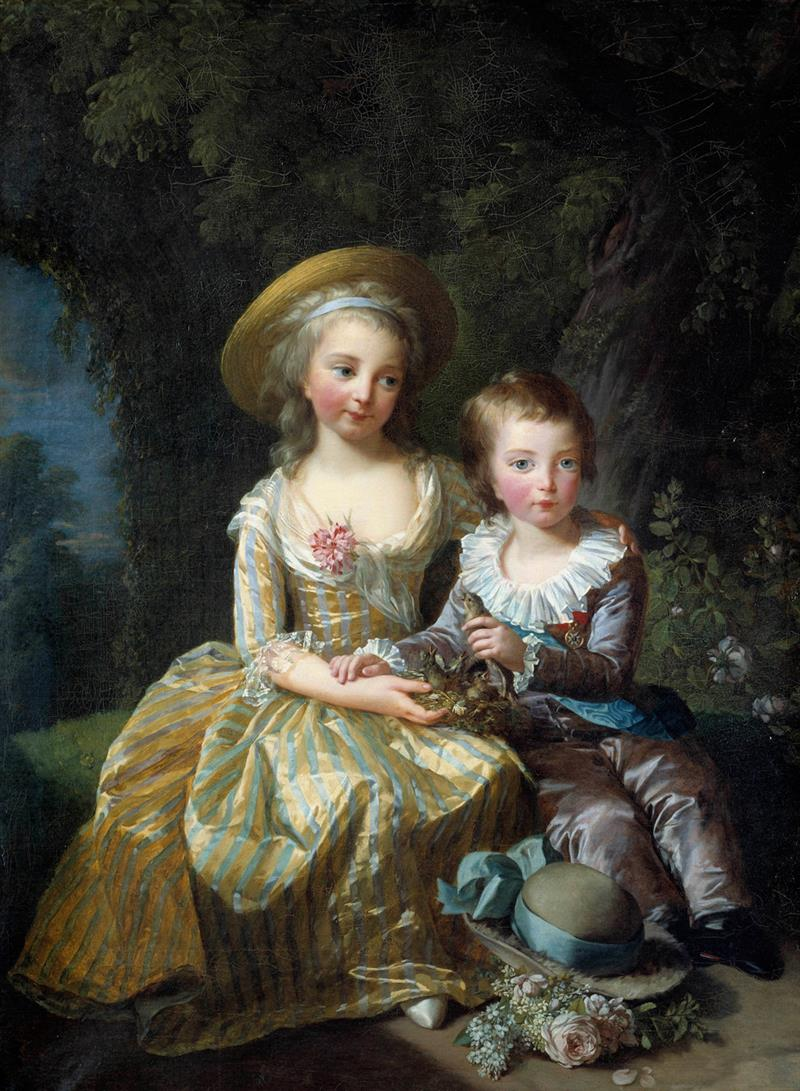
Madame Royale and the Dauphin by Élisabeth Vigée Le Brun

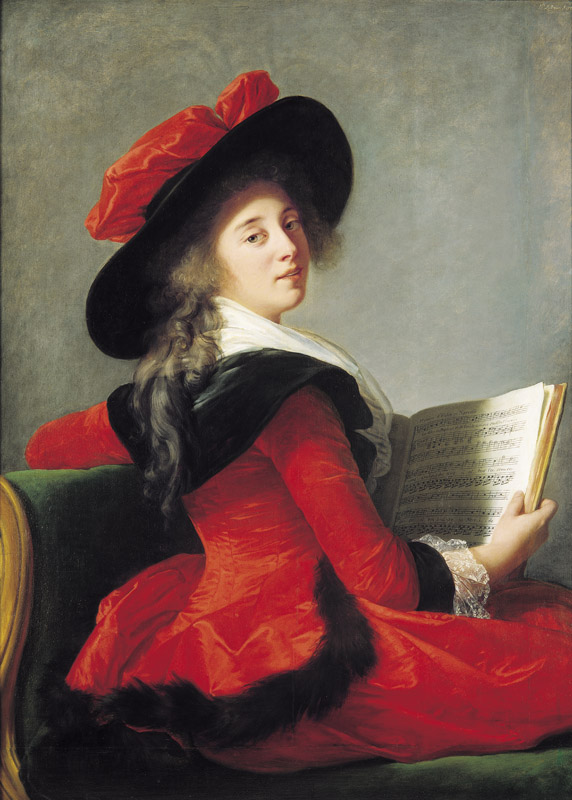
Portrait of Bonne-Marie-Joséphine-Gabrielle de Crussol by Élisabeth Vigée Le Brun

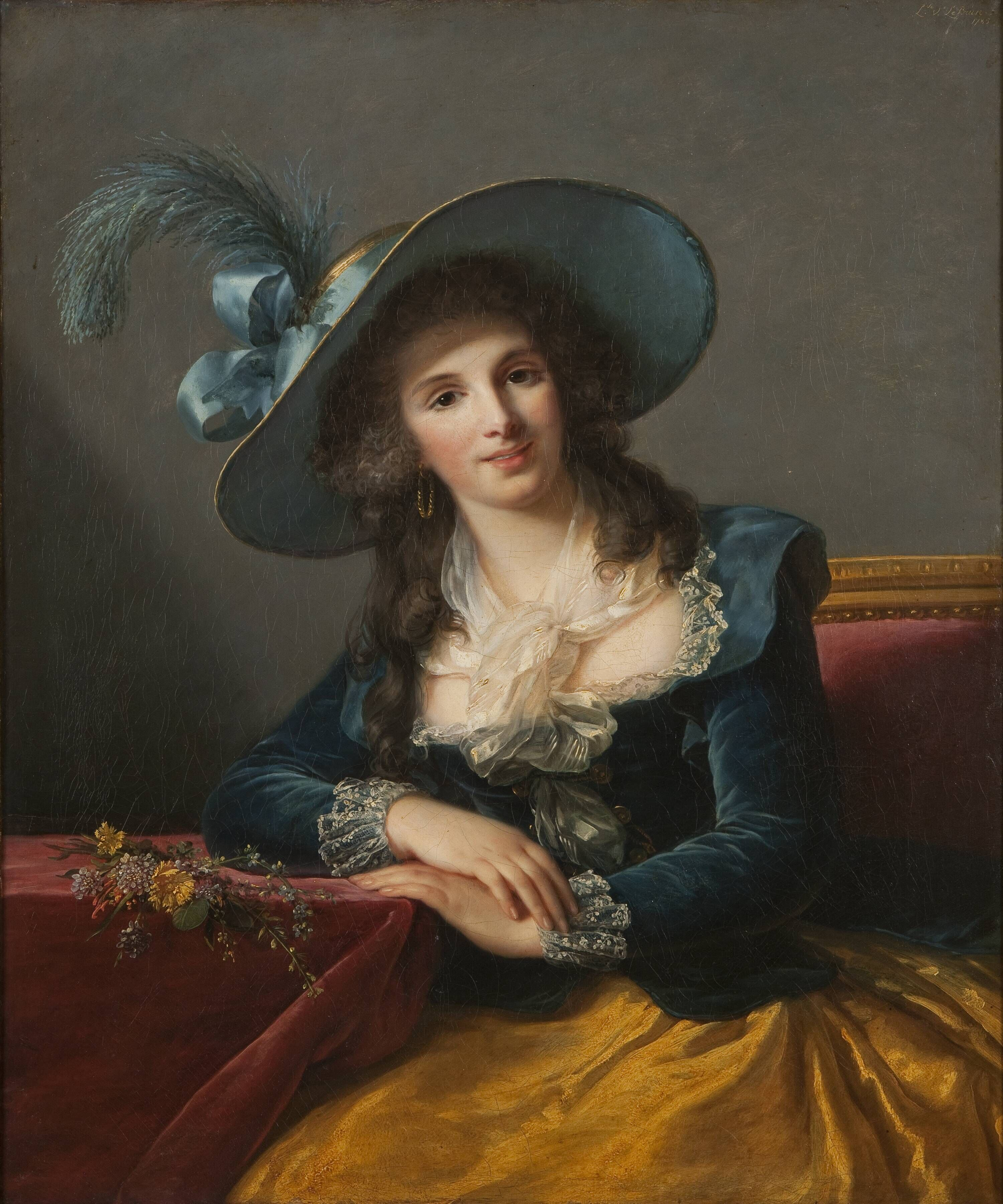
Portrait of the Countess of Ségur by Élisabeth Vigée Le Brun

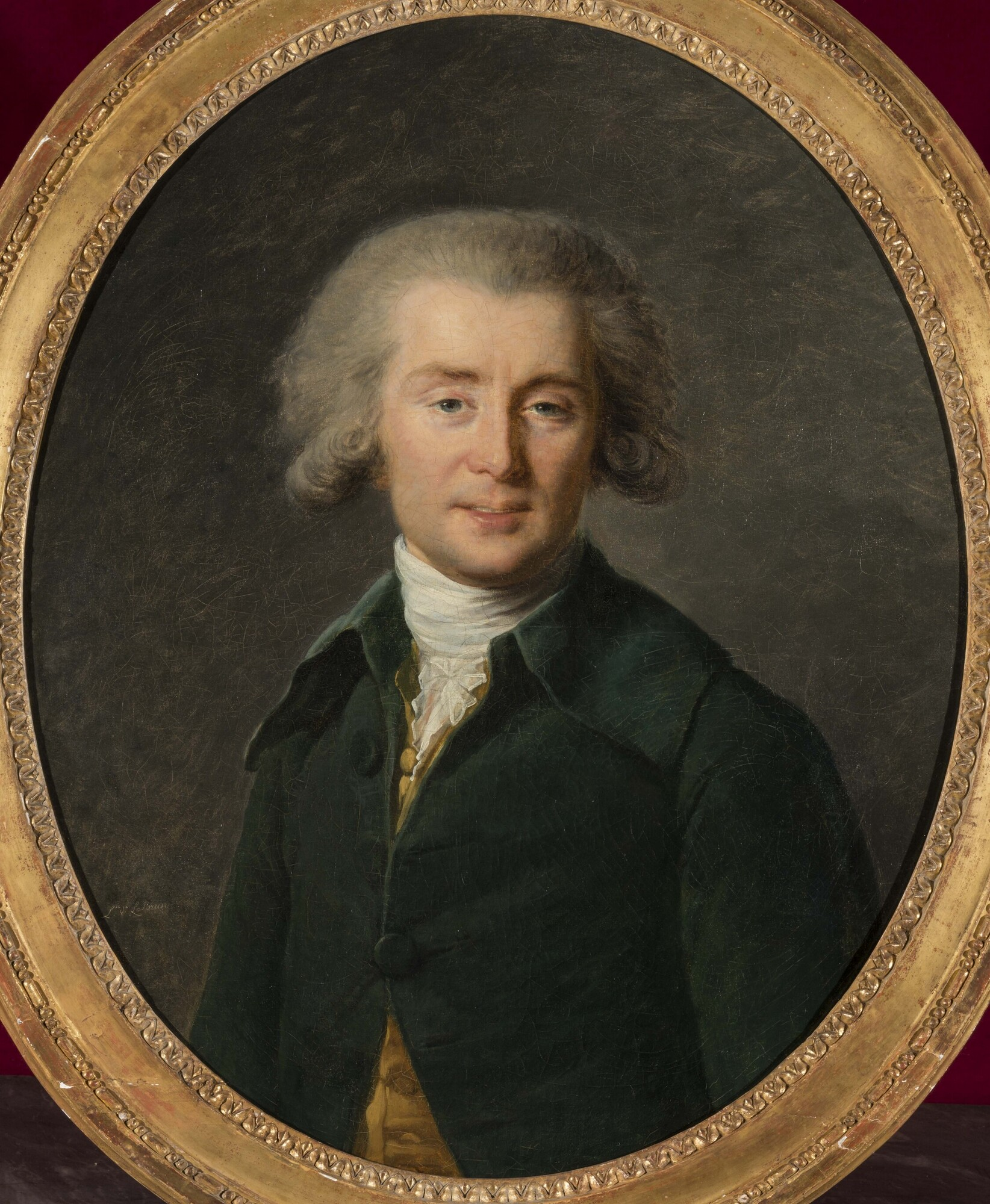
Portrait of André Grétry by Élisabeth Vigée Le Brun

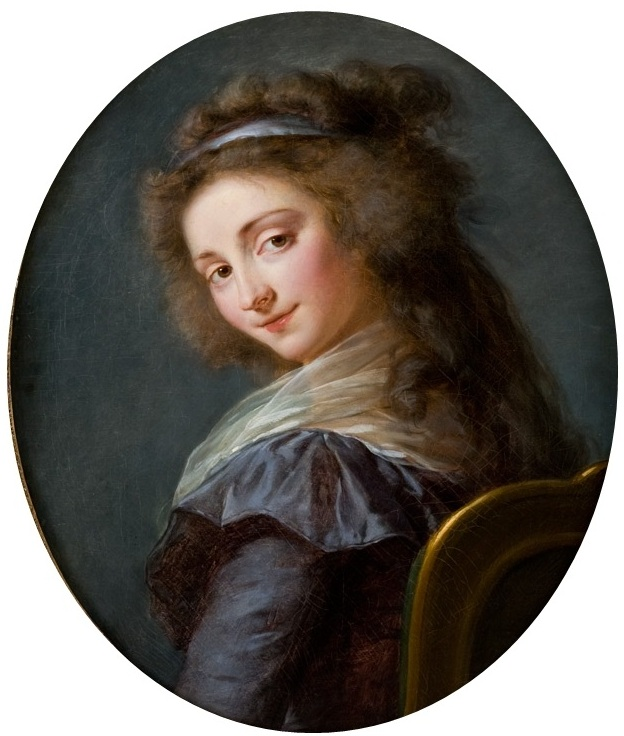
Portrait of the Countess of Chatenois by Élisabeth Vigée Le Brun

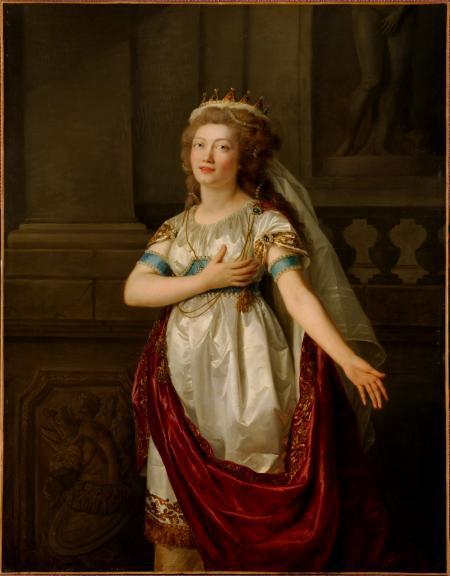
Madame de Saint-Huberty in the Role of Dido by Anne Vallayer-Coster

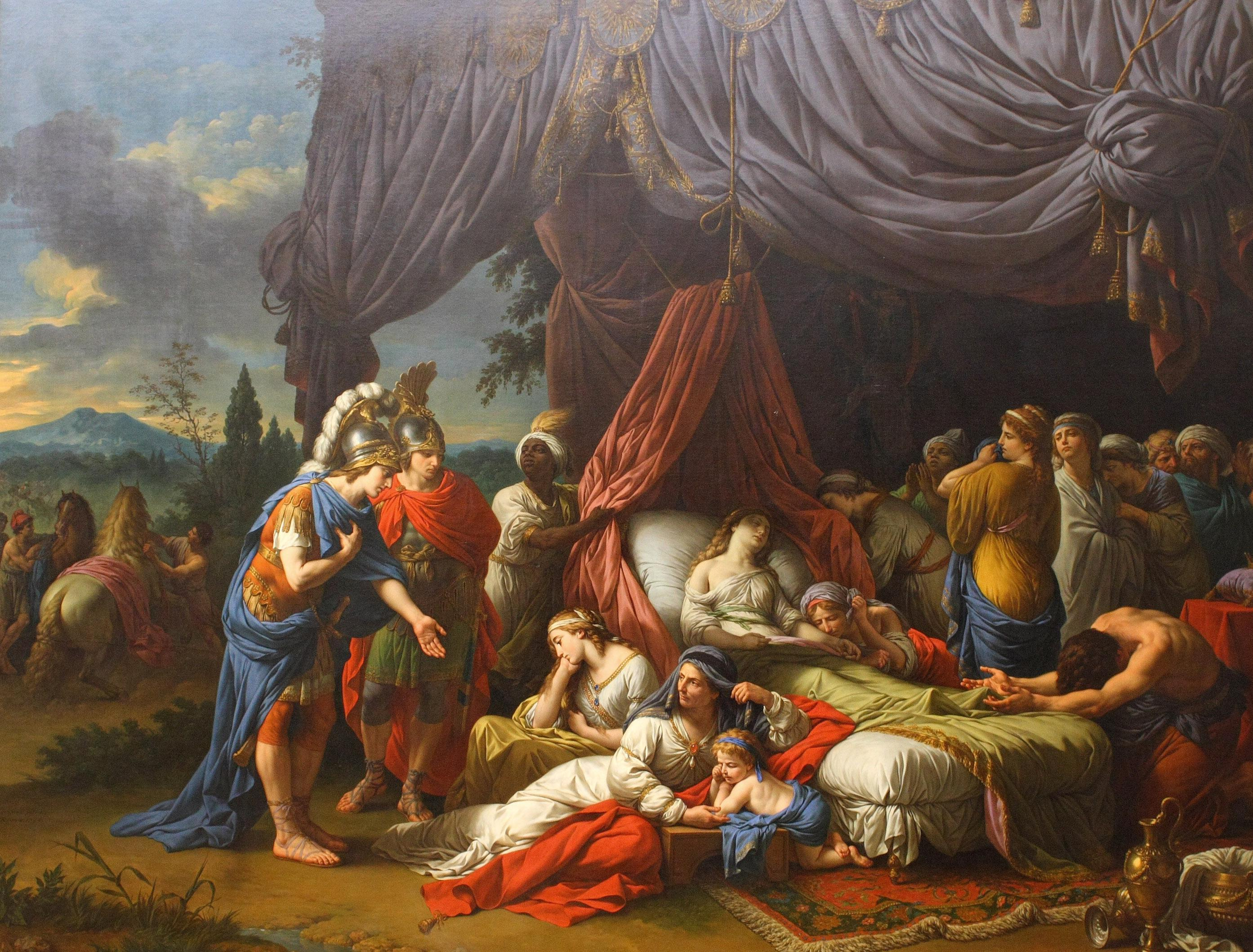
La mort de la femme de Darius by Louis-Jean-François Lagrenée

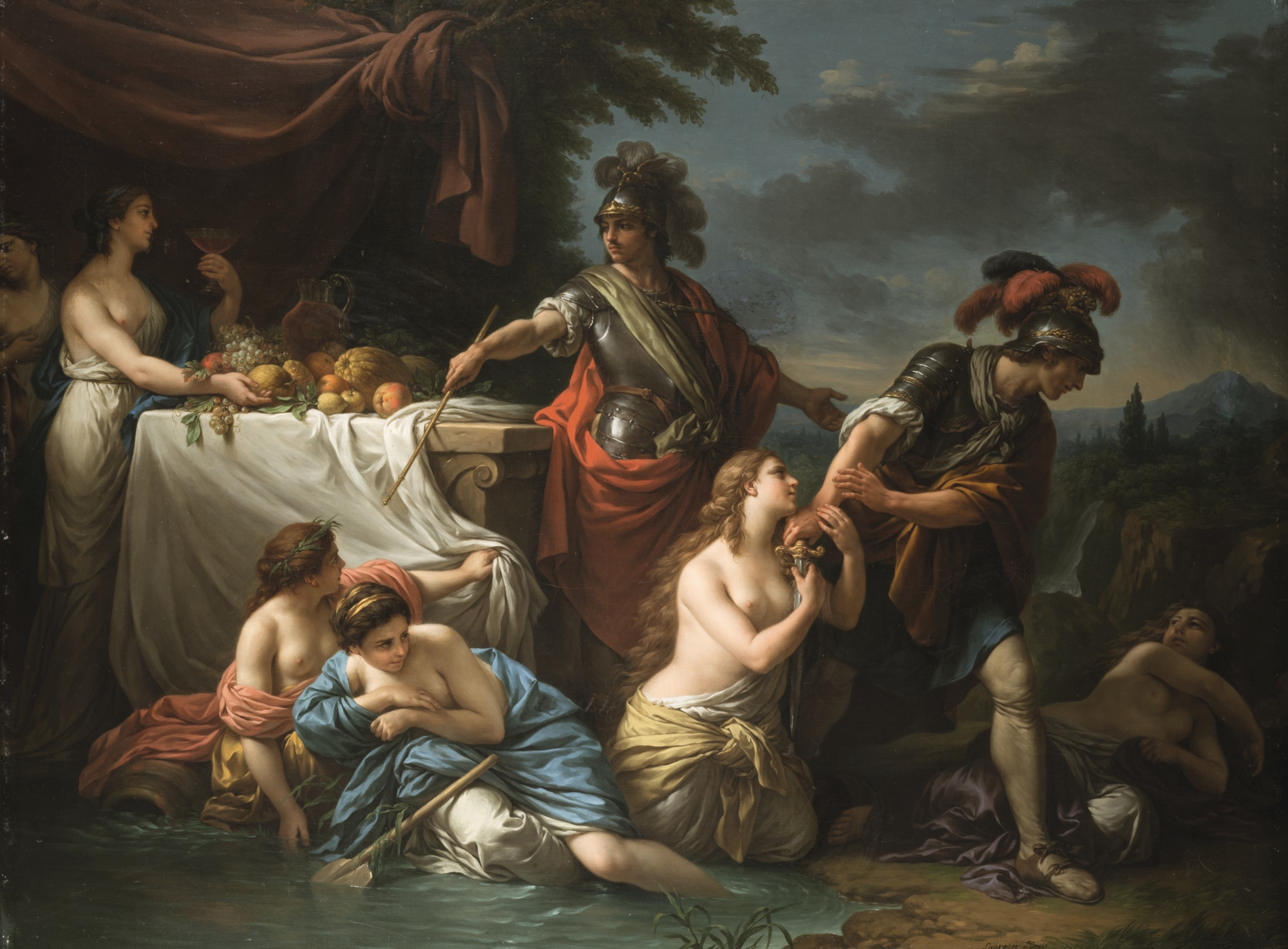
Ubalde et le chevalier Danois by Louis-Jean-François Lagrenée

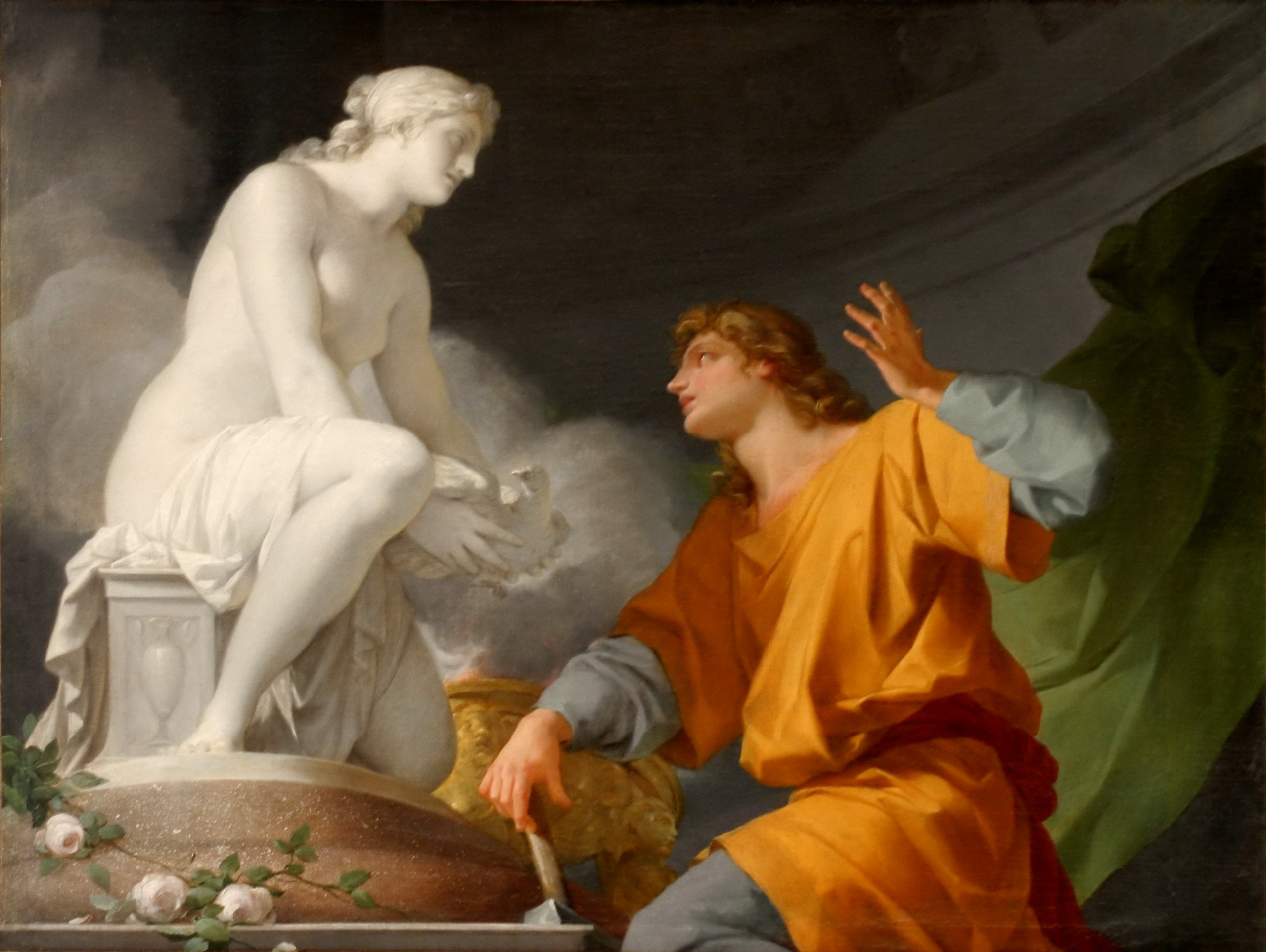
The Origin of Sculpture by Jean-Baptiste Regnault

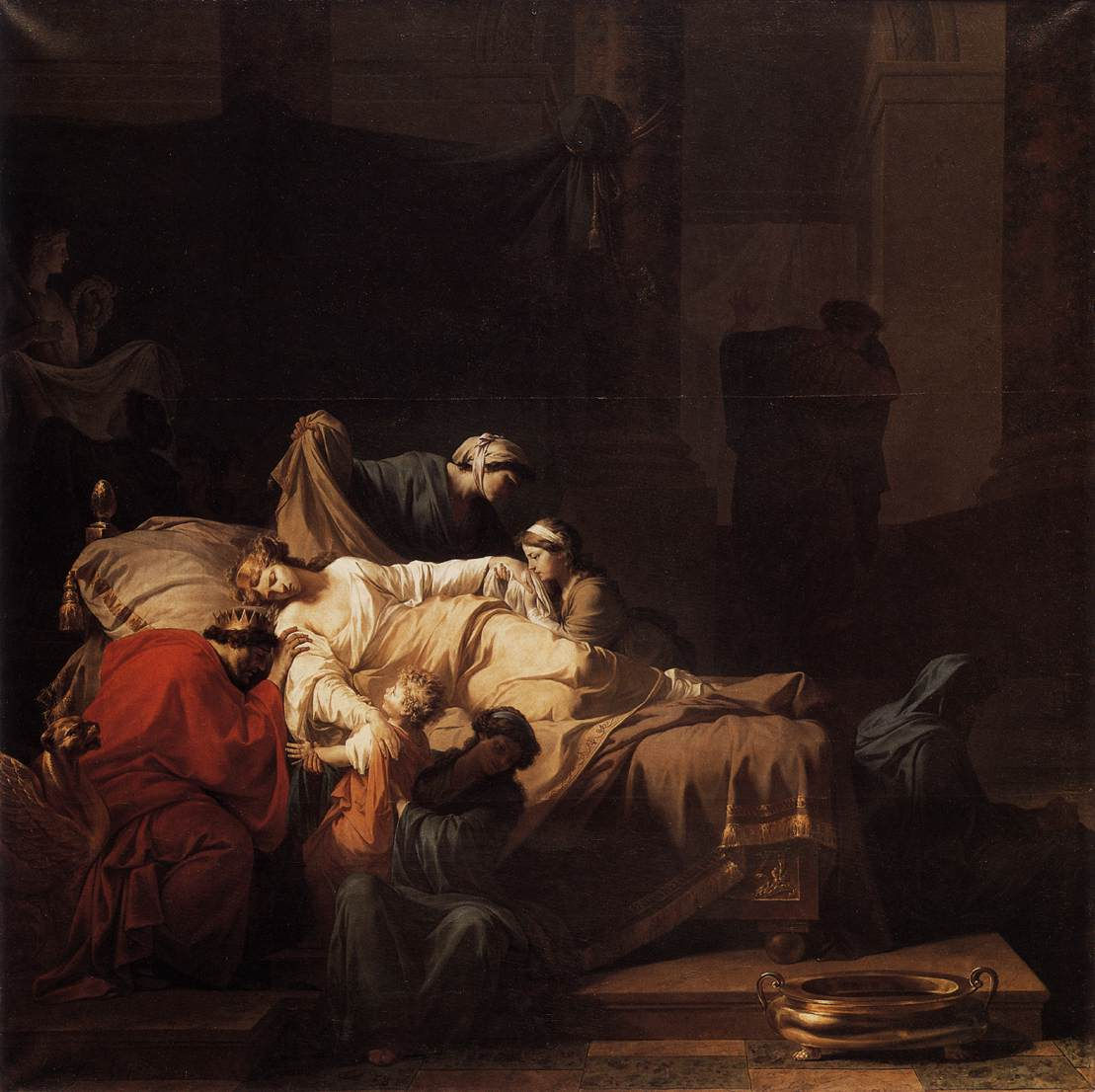
The Death of Alceste by Jean-François Pierre Peyron

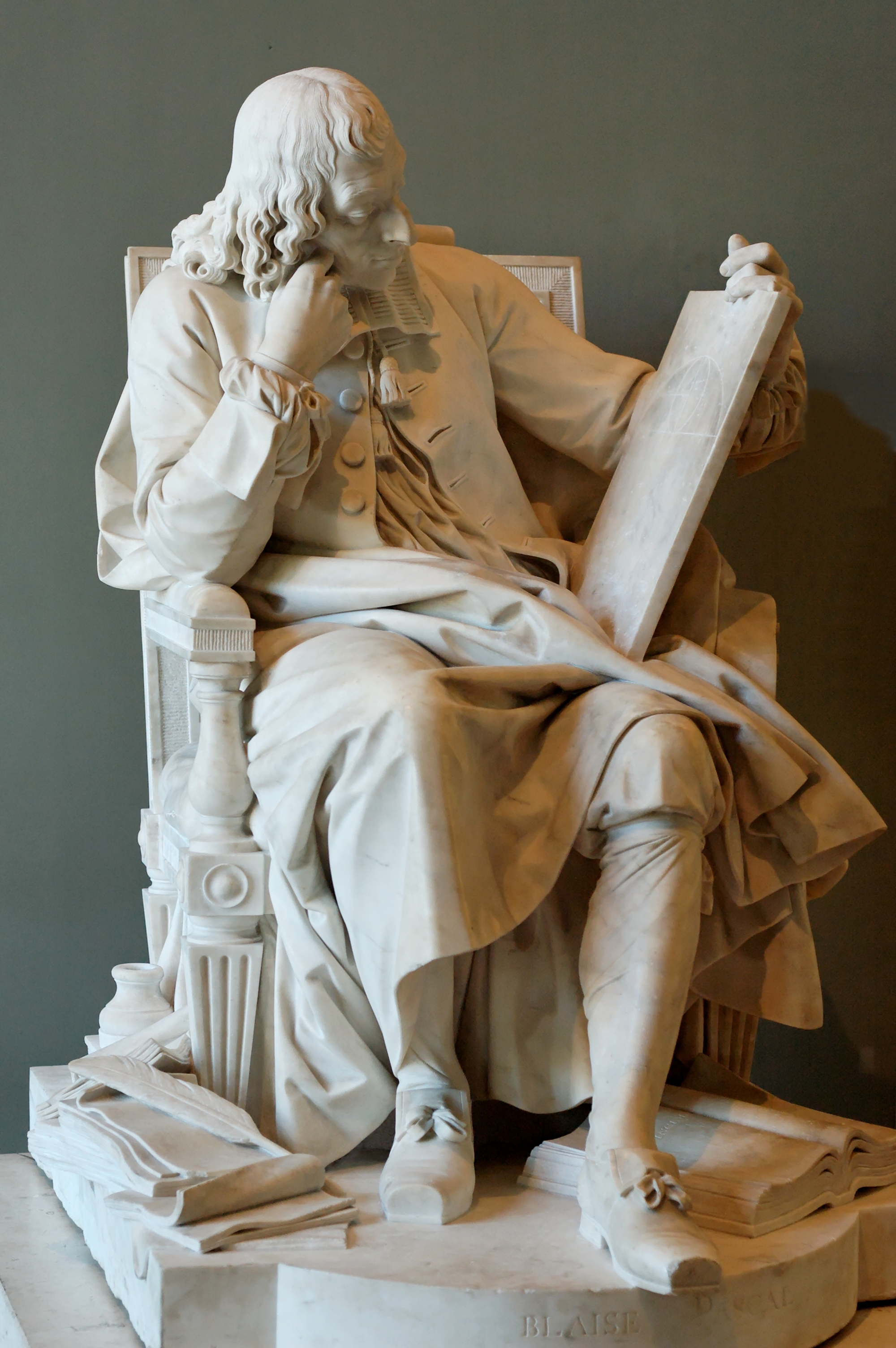
Blaise Pascal by Augustin Pajou

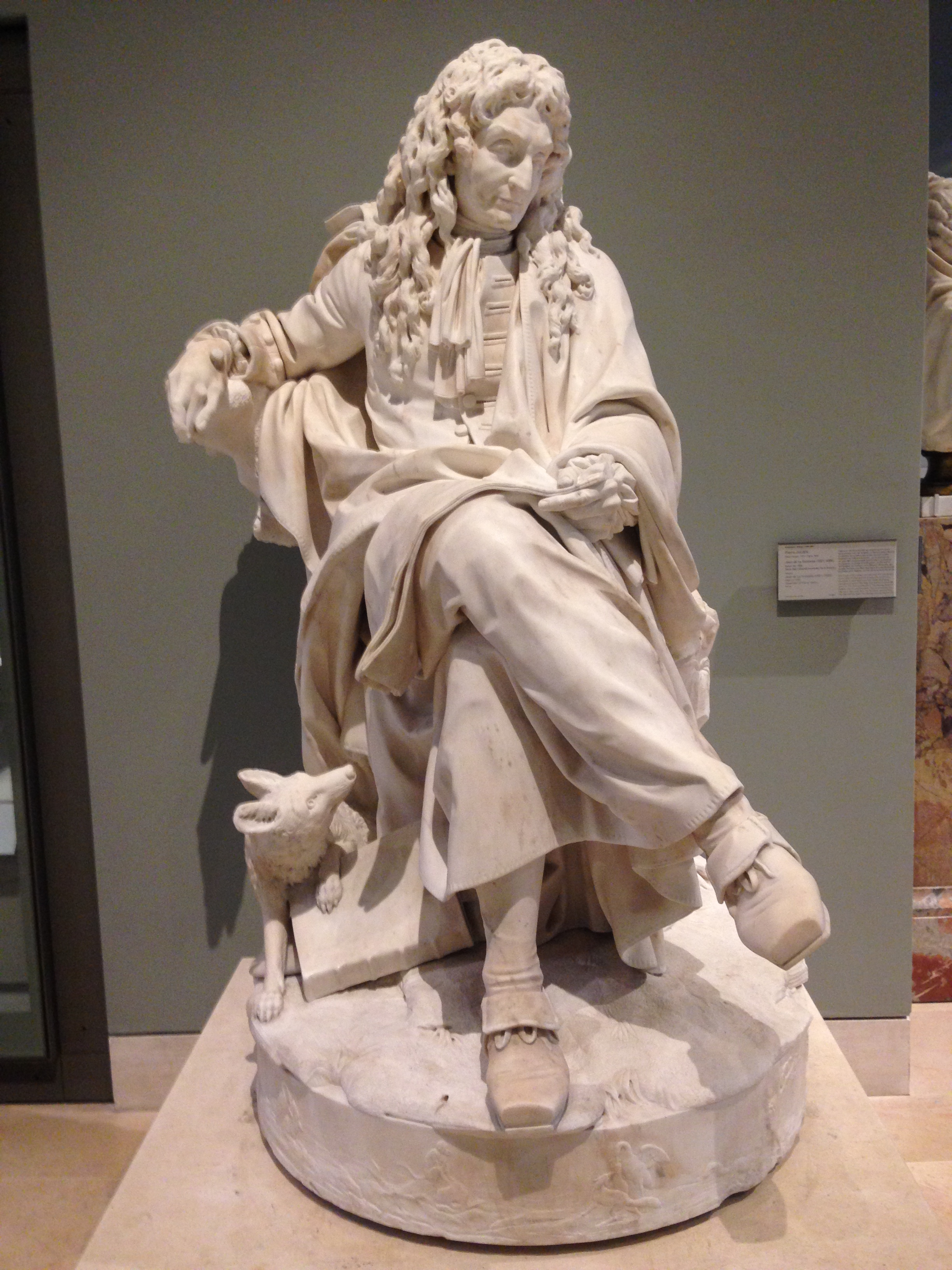
Jean de La Fontaine by Pierre Julien

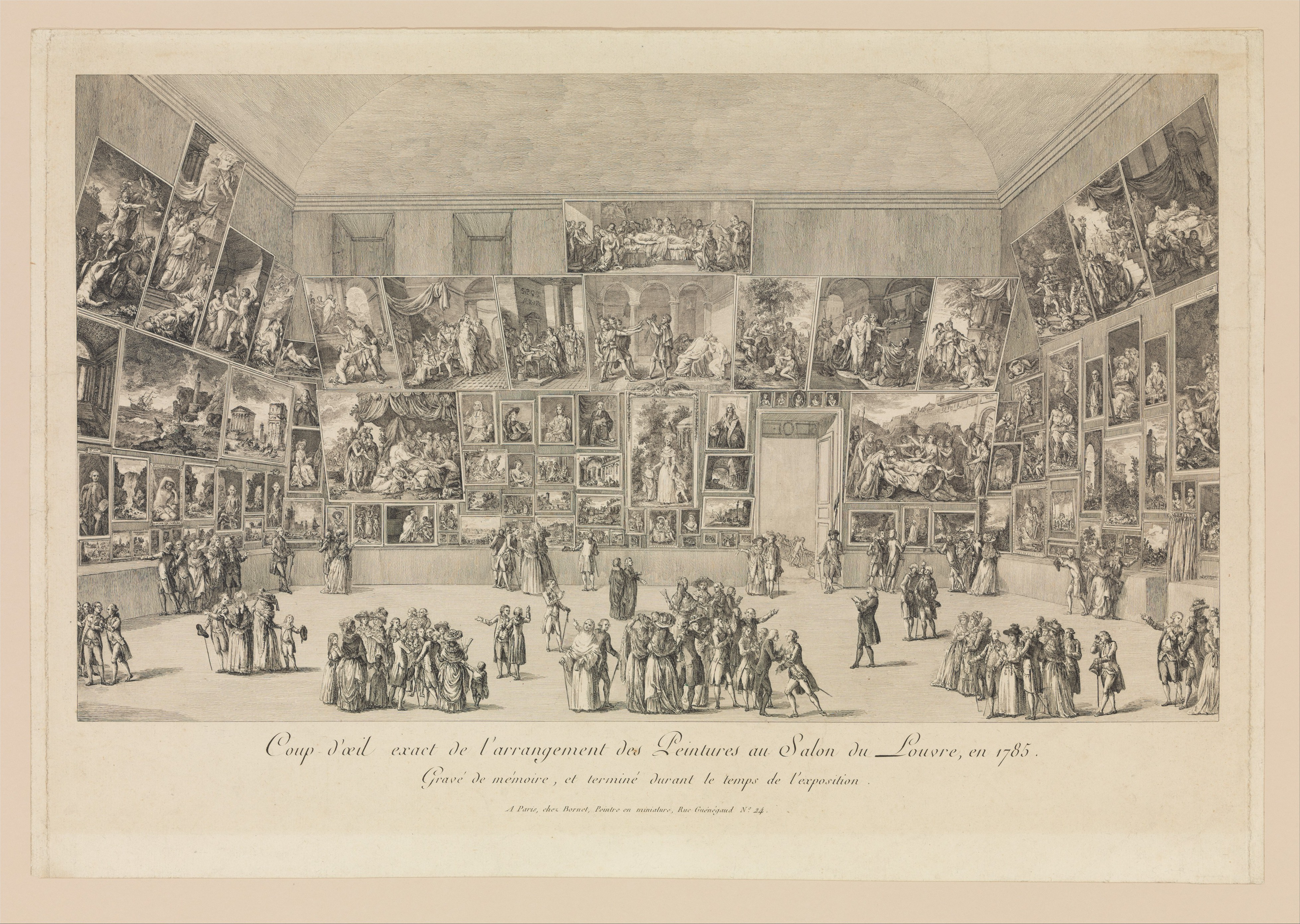
Print depicting the Salon of 1785

== Bibliography ==
- Doyle, William. Old Regime France, 1648-1788. Oxford University Press, 2001.
- Hobbs, Jack A. & Duncan, Robert L. Arts, Ideas, and Civilization. Prentice Hall, 1992.
- Kelder, Diane. Aspects of Official Painting and Philosophic Art, 1789-1799. Garland Publishing, 1976.
