= Premier peintre du Roi =

French royal post from 1603 to 1791

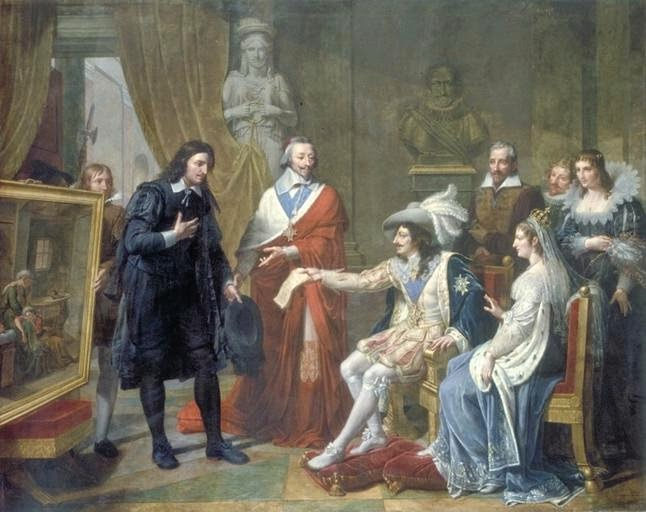
Nicolas Poussin, presented by Cardinal Richelieu, is appointed premier peintre du Roi by King Louis XIII, 1641. Painting by Antoine Ansiaux, 1817.

The Premier peintre du Roi (French pronunciation: [pʁəmje pɛ̃tʁ dy ʁwa]; 'First painter to the King') was a court painter position within the administration of the Bâtiments du Roi of the Département de la Maison du Roi in France under the Ancien Régime. Its holder occupied a similar position to that of Premier architecte du Roi (albeit a far less prestigious one). The holder was not in charge of any other court staff, and the role was often without a holder.

Unlike in other countries, the premier peintre was often, even usually, not a specialist portrait-painter, but was always a native Frenchman. The most famous holder, Nicolas Poussin, was persuaded to return to France in 1640 to take the office, but returned to Rome after a little more than a year. Despite this, he held the position for another 23 years.

In contrast, his successor Charles Le Brun devoted most of his time to his work for Louis XIV, decorating his palaces and designing for and supervising the royal factories of the Savonnerie manufactory for carpets and the Gobelins Manufactory for tapestries and furniture. Le Brun had a bitter, life-long rivalry with the portraitist Pierre Mignard, who finally succeeded him at the age of 78, but only held the post for the five years before he died.

== Holders ==
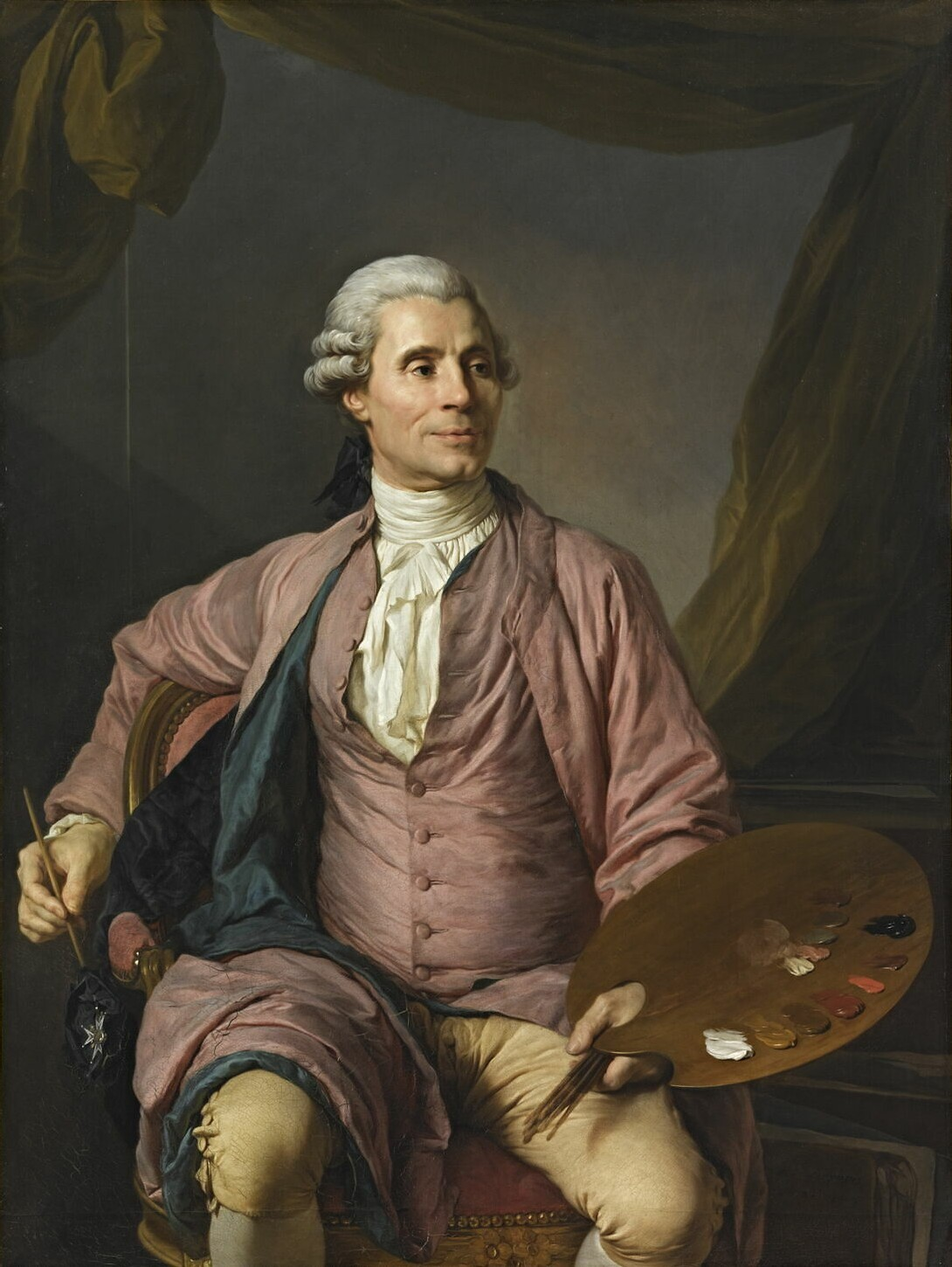
Portrait of Joseph-Marie Vien by Joseph Duplessis. Vien was the last holder of the position before its abolition in the French Revolution

- 1603–1619 : Martin Fréminet
- 1627–1649 : Simon Vouet
- 1641–1665 : Nicolas Poussin
- 1664–1690 : Charles Le Brun
- 1690–1695 : Pierre Mignard
- 1695–1716 : vacant
- 1716–1722 : Antoine Coypel
- 1722–1725 : vacant
- 1725–1733 : Louis de Boullogne
- 1733–1736 : vacant
- 1736–1737 : François Lemoyne
- 1737–1746 : vacant
- 1746–1752 : Charles-Antoine Coypel
- 1752–1762 : vacant
- 1762–1765 : Carle Van Loo
- 1765–1770 : François Boucher
- 1770–1789 : Jean-Baptiste Marie Pierre
- 1789–1791 : Joseph-Marie Vien

== See also ==
- Principal Painter in Ordinary, a similar position in Britain
