= Jean-François Pierre Peyron =

French painter (1744–1814)

Pierre Peyron
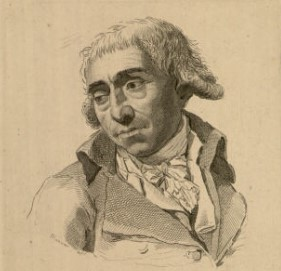
- Portrait of Peyron by either Peyron's student, Nicolas-André Monsiau, or another, anonymous artist.
- Born: Jean-François Pierre Peyron; December 15, 1744; Aix-en-Provence, France
- Died: January 20, 1814 (aged 69); Paris, France
- Education: Beaux-Arts de Paris
- Notable work: The Death of Seneca
- Movement: Neoclassicism
- Awards: Prix de Rome (1773)

Jean-François Pierre Peyron (15 December 1744 – 20 January 1814) was a French Neoclassical painter, printmaker, and art collector.

== Biography ==
Peyron was born on 15 December 1744 in Aix-en-Provence in Southern France to a wealthy family. He studied law until the death of his father in 1765, at which point Peyron enrolled in the École de dessin (Drawing School) in Aix. There he learned from the history painter and etcher Michel-François Dandré-Bardon. In 1767, Peyron moved to Paris at the age of twenty-three where he entered the atelier of Rococo painter Louis Jean François Lagrenée.

He was one of the first to re-apply the Classic principles of composition, in the manner of Poussin, while the prevailing fashion was in favour of Rococo.

In 1773, the Académie royale de peinture announced that the theme for the next Grand Prix de Rome would be the death of Seneca as described by Tacitus, a favorite topic for French painters. Of the six artists approved to compete, first prize was awarded to Peyron for a now lost painting, but for which an engraving survives.

He spent the years between 1775 and 1782 in Rome, with the Academy of France in Rome.

== Relegation ==
On his return to Paris, Peyron found that the career of his rival, Jacques-Louis David, had taken its rise and had completely eclipsed his own, relegating it to a minor role in the history of art – which became evident in the exhibitions at the Salon of Paris between 1785 and 1787. Following his fall from grace, Peyron was appointed inspector general of the Gobelins tapestry factory from 1786 to 1792.

David would later pay homage to Peyron at the time of his funeral, stating: "He had opened my eyes".

== Death ==
Peyron died in Paris in 1814, aged 69.

== List of works (partial) ==
- The Death of Seneca (1773) – a now-lost painting that earned Peyron the Prix de Rome
- Athéniennes or Young Athenians Drawing Lots to be Sacrificed to the Minotaur (1778) – Wellington Museum, London
- Belisarius Receiving Hospitality from a Peasant Who Had Served under Him (1779) – Musée de Augustins, Toulouse
- Hagar and the Angel (1779) – private collection, Paris
- Cornelia, Mother of the Gracchi (1781) – National Gallery, London
- The Funeral of Miltiades (1782) – The Louvre, Paris
- The Resurrection of Christ (1784) – Church of Saint-Louis-en-l'Île, Paris
- Socrate arrachant Alcibiade des bras de la Volupté (1785) – Musée d'Art et d'Archéologie, Guéret
- The Death of Alcestis (1785) – The Louvre, Paris
- The Death of Socrates (1786 or 1787) – National Gallery of Denmark, Copenhagen
- Manius Curius Dentatus Refusing the Samnite Ambassadors (1787) – Musée des Beaux-Arts, Marseille
- The Death of Socrates (1788) – Joslyn Art Museum, Omaha
- Ulysse et Nausicaa (1791) – Staatliches Museum Schwerin, Schwerin
- Time and Minerva (1799) – Ministère des Armées, Paris
- King Perseus of Macedon in front of Aemilius Paulus (1802) – Museum of Fine Arts, Budapest
- Paul-Émile, conqueror of Perseus, last king of the Macedonians (1804) – Exhibited at the Salon of 1804, then later deposited at the Museum of Fine Arts in Caen before being destroyed during World War II. A painted sketch from 1802 can still be found in Budapest.
- The Death of General Valhubert (1808) – Musée de l'Histoire de France, Palace of Versailles
- The School of Pythagoras (1812) – Exhibited at the Salon of 1812, now lost
- L'Entretien de Démocrite avec Hippocrate (1812) – Exhibited at the Salon of 1812, now lost
- Sainte Madeleine méditant – Musée Granet, Aix-en-Provence

== Gallery ==
Works by Pierre Peyron

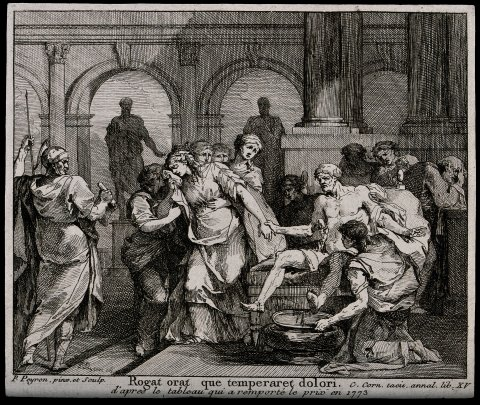
The Death of Seneca (1773 or 1774). Copper engraving of the now-lost original that won the Grand Prix.

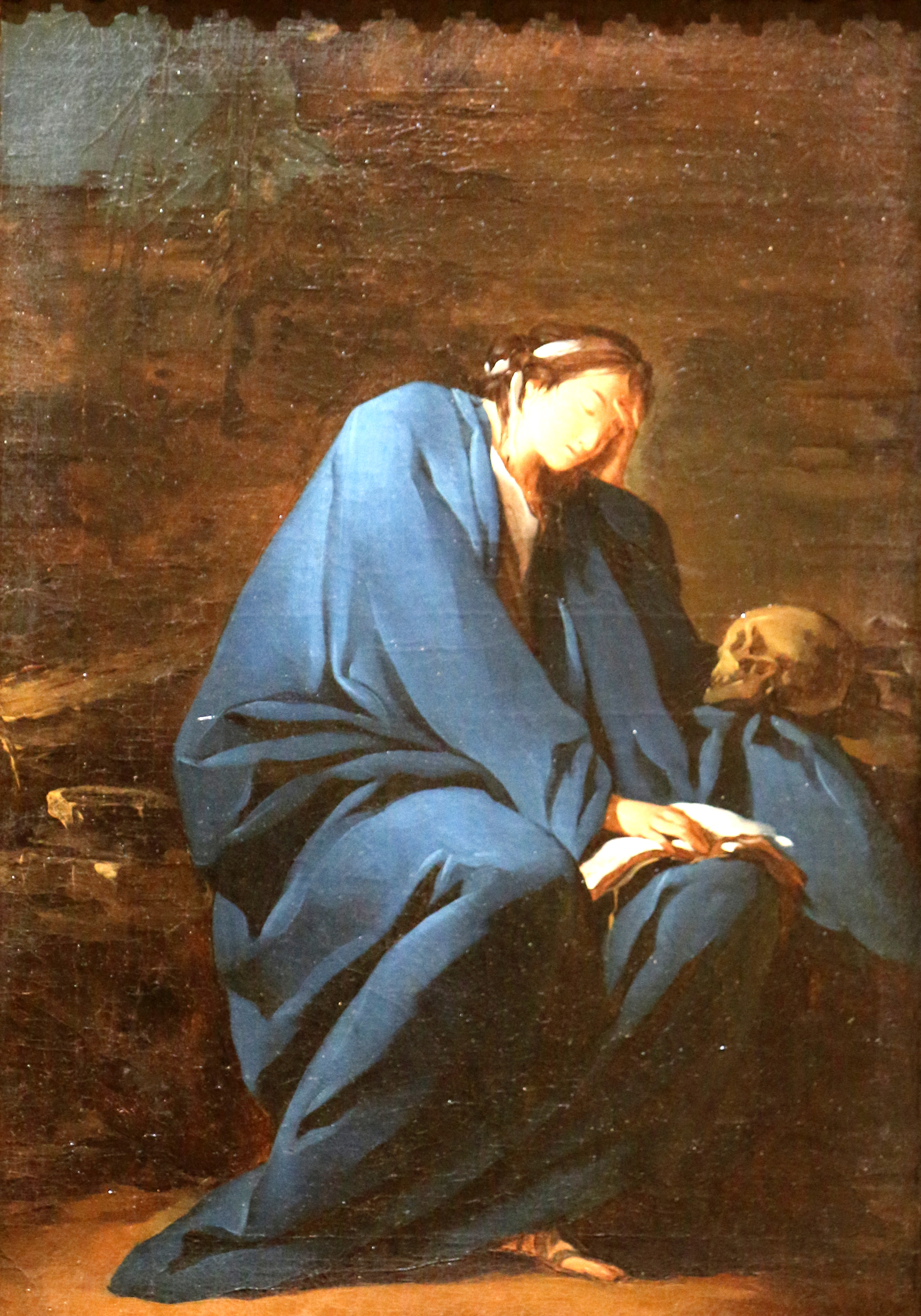
Sainte Madeleine méditant

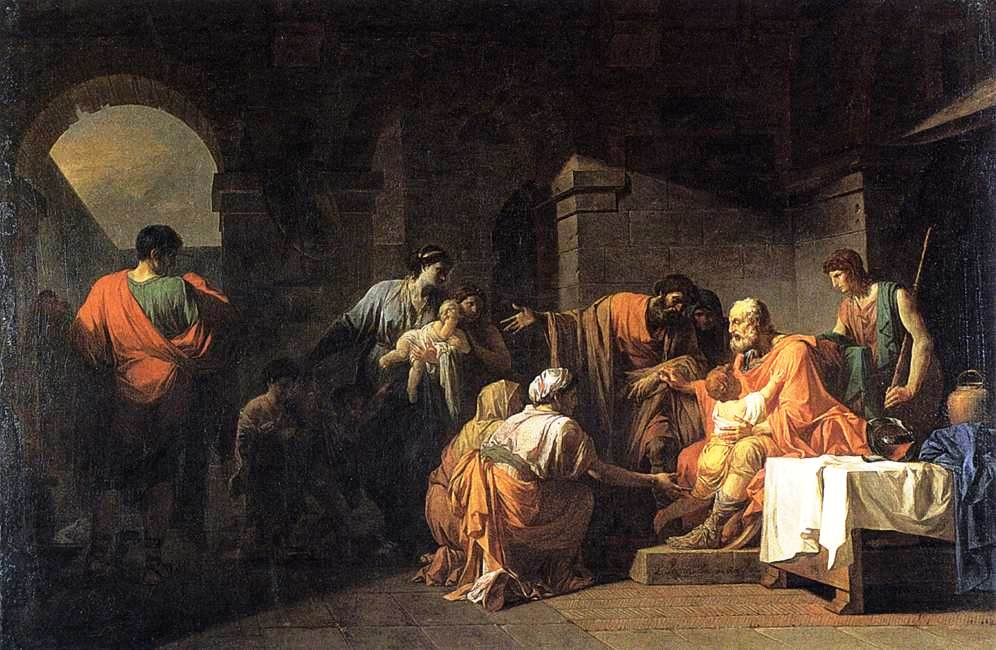
Belisarius Receiving Hospitality from a Peasant Who Had Served under Him (1779)

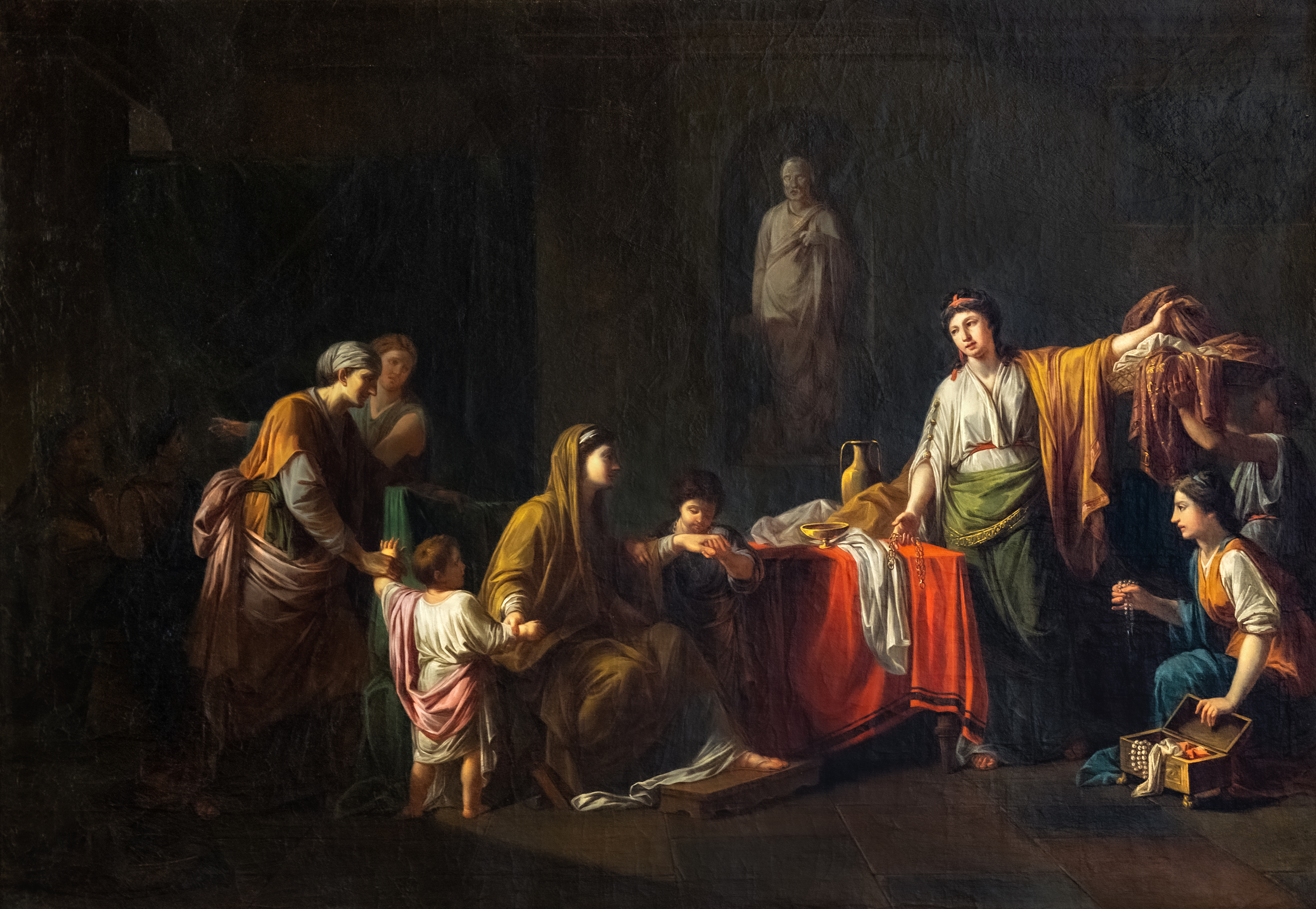
Cornelia, Mother of the Gracchi (1779)

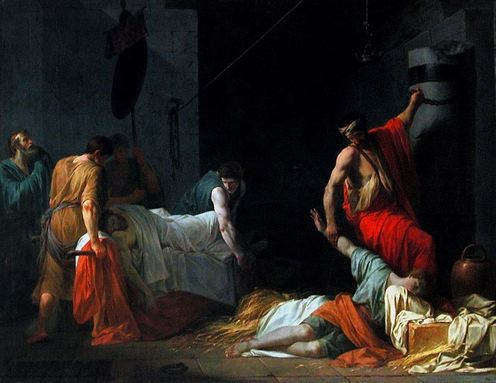
The Funeral of Miltiades (1782)

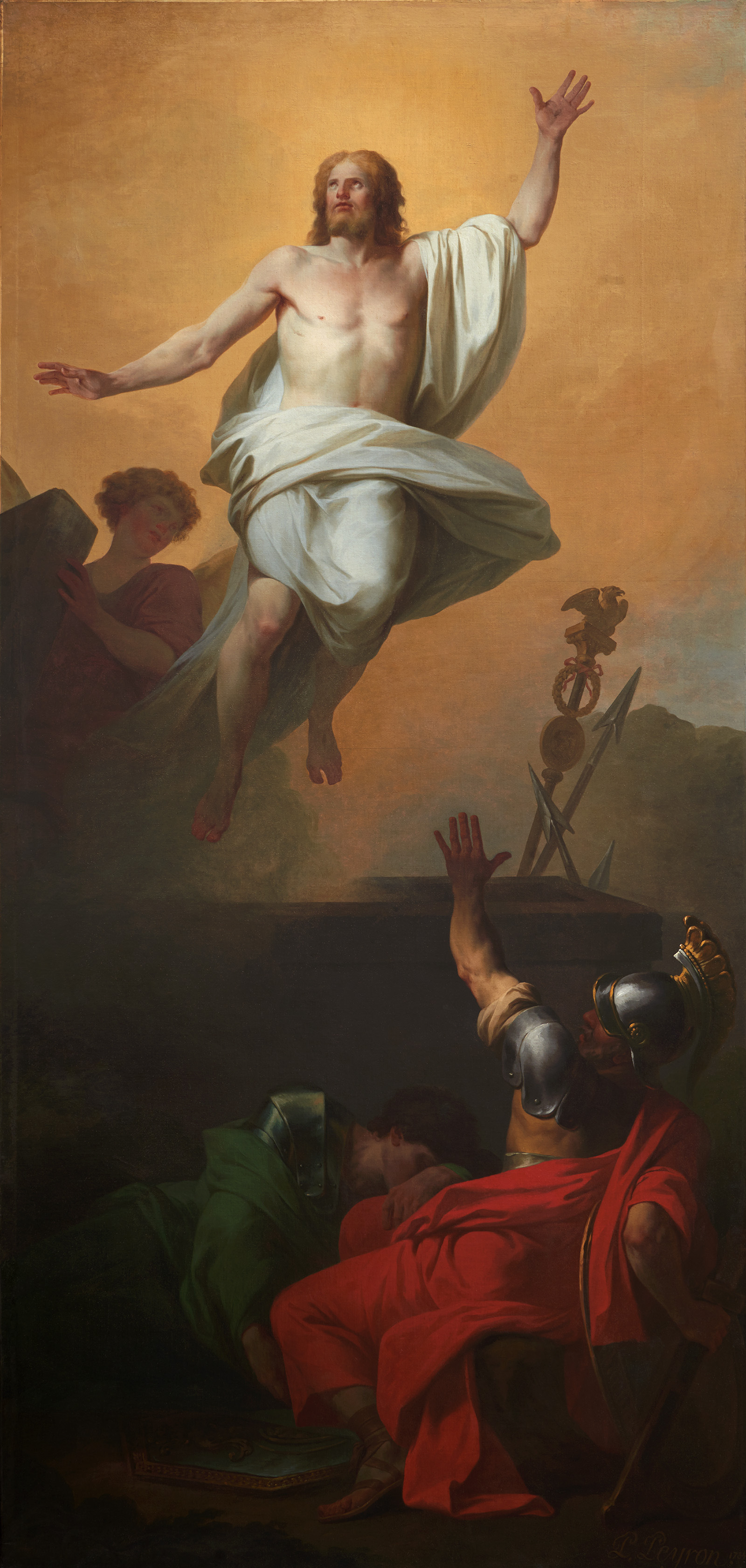
La Résurrection (1784)

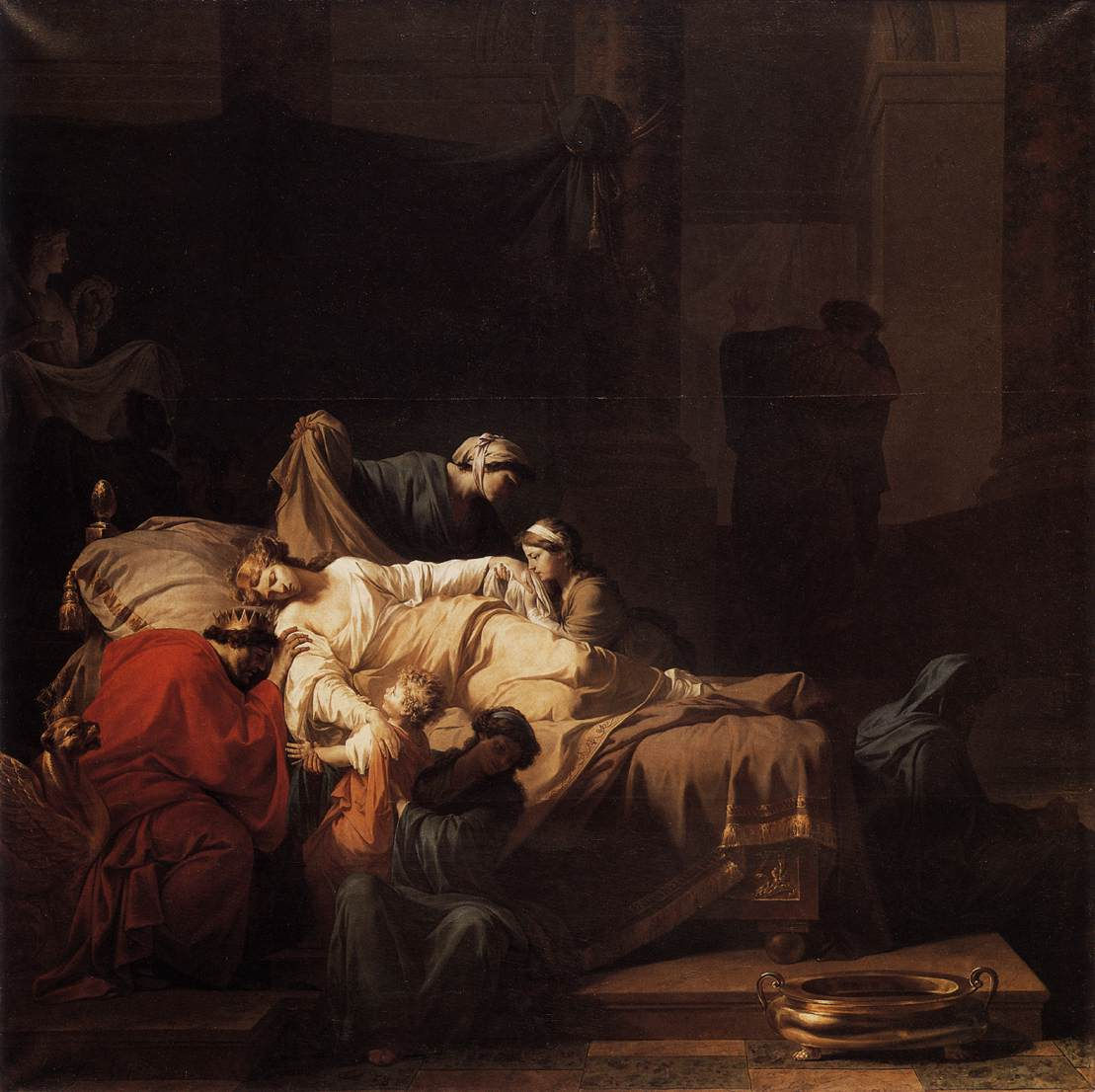
The Death of Alcestis (1785)

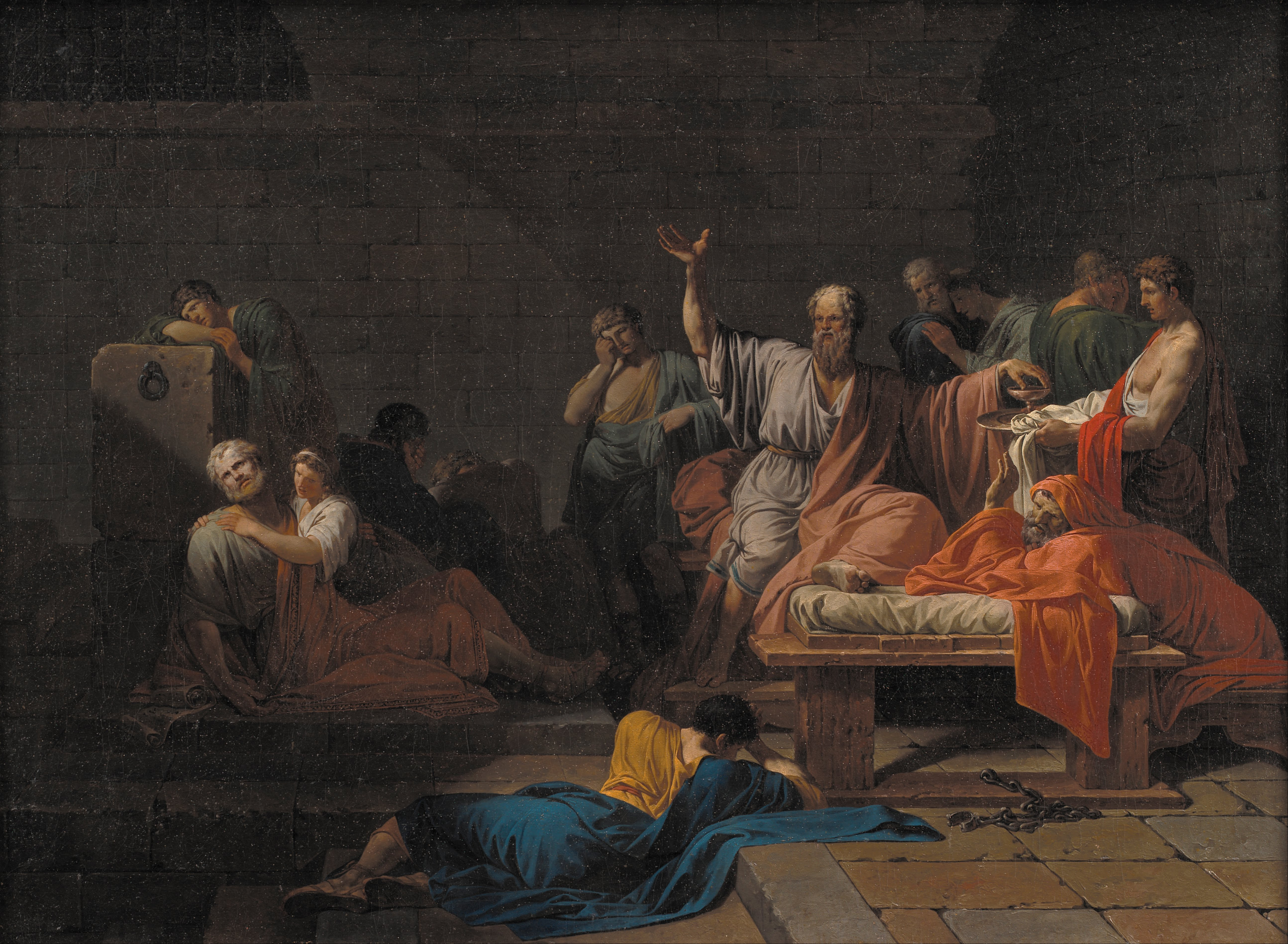
The Death of Socrates (1786 or 1787)

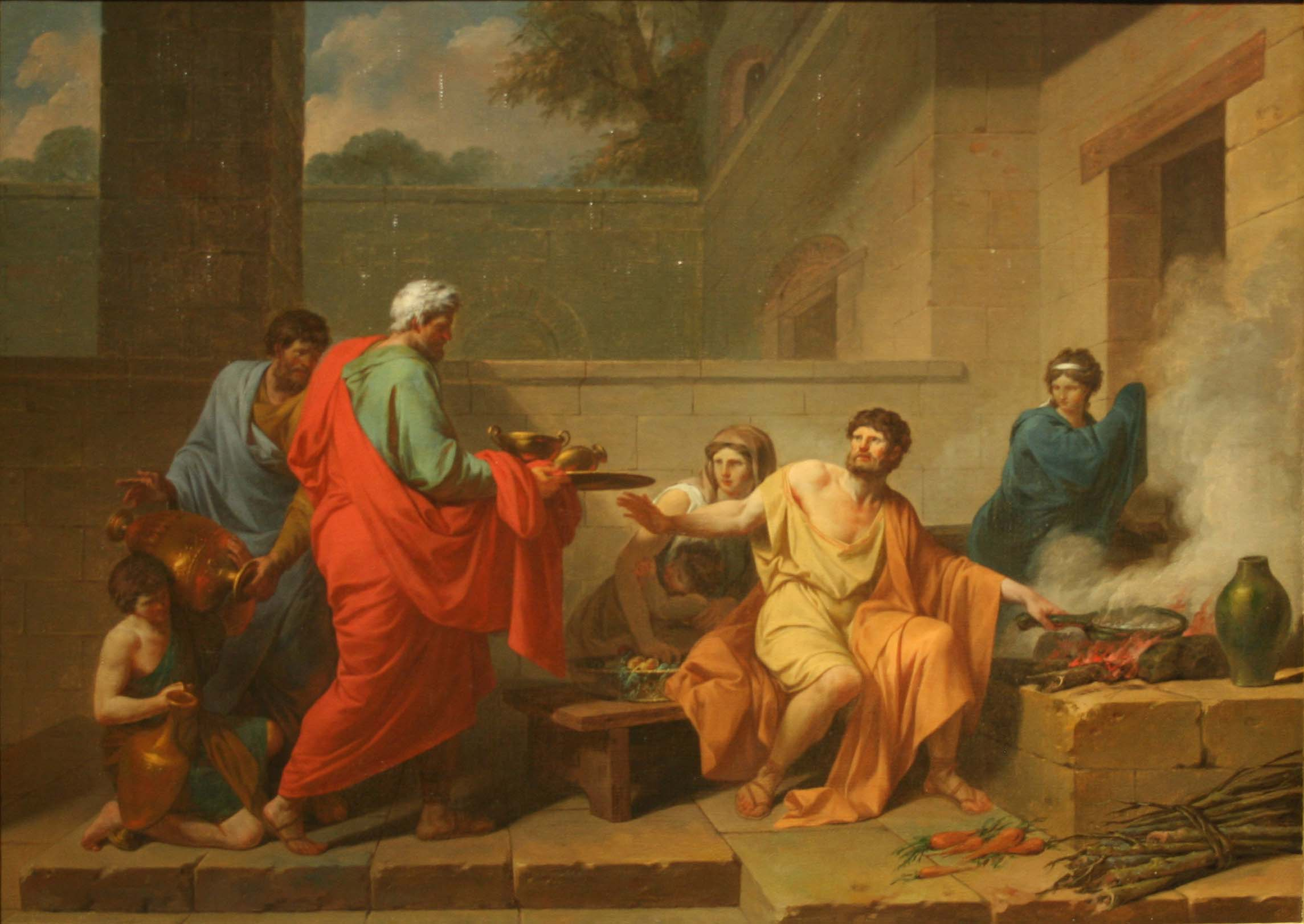
Manius Curius Dentatus Refusing the Samnite Ambassadors (1787)

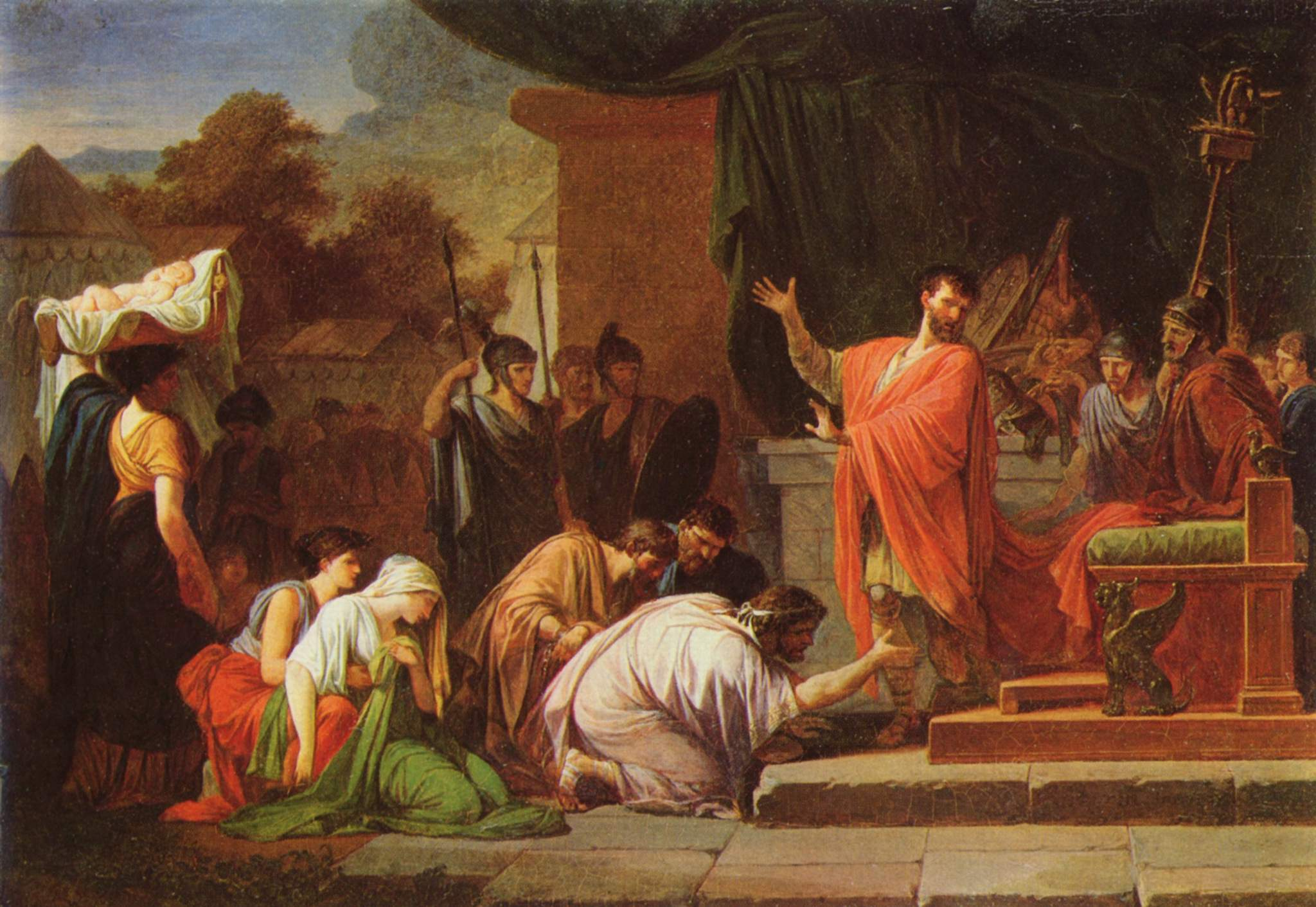
King Perseus of Macedon in front of Aemilius Paulus (1802)

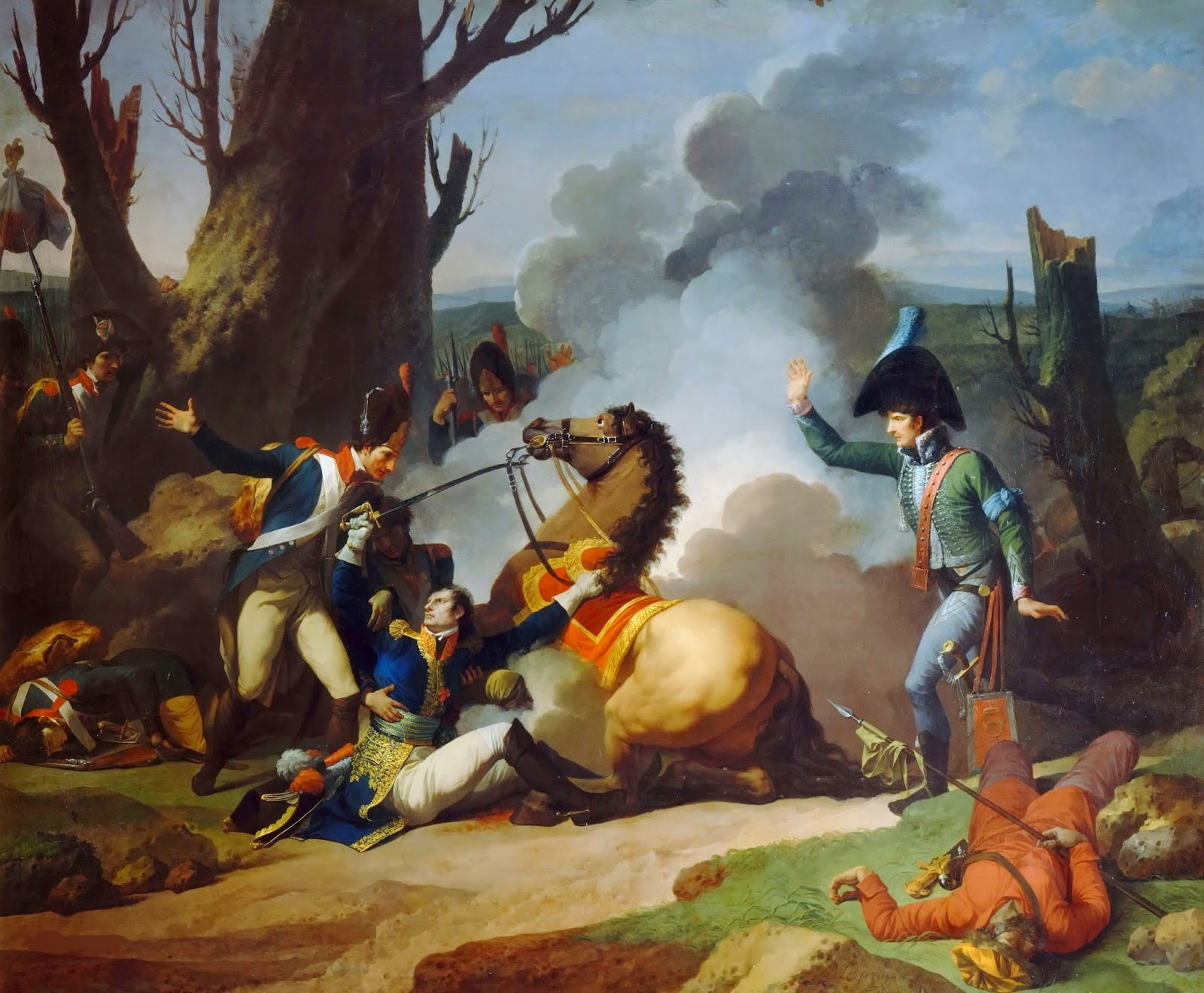
The Death of General Valhubert (1808)

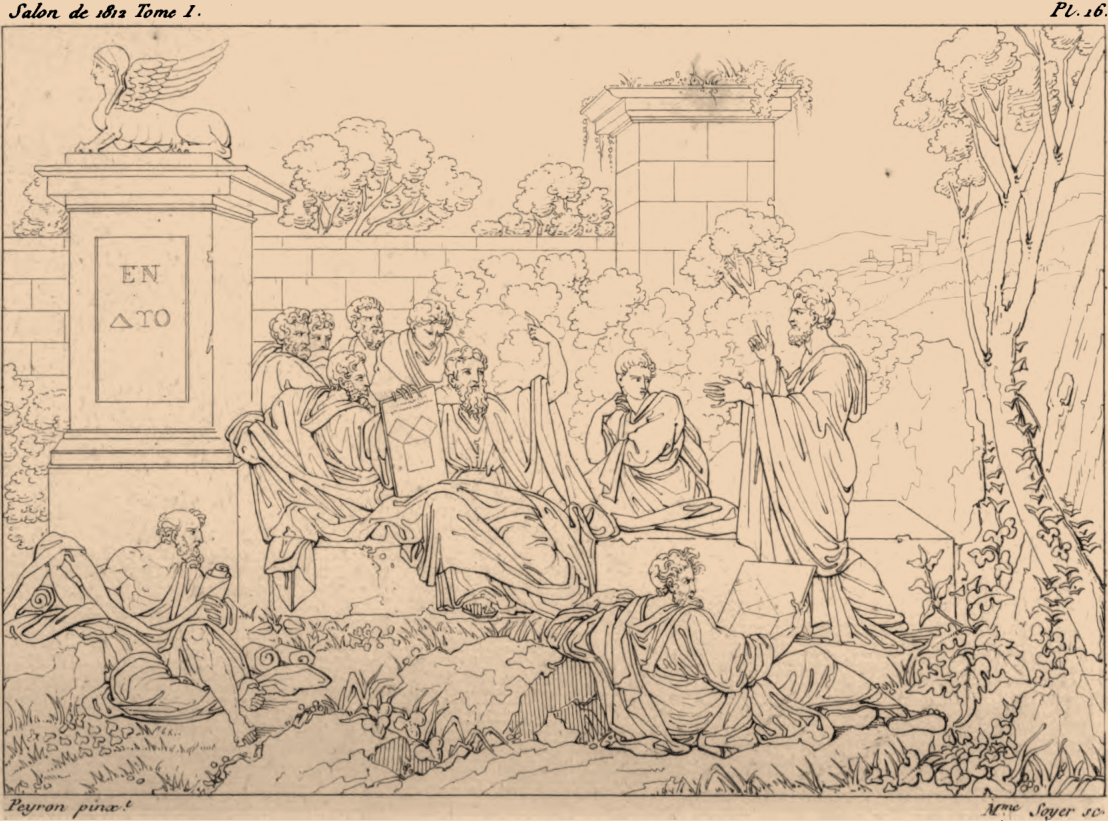
The School of Pythagoras (1812). Contemporary sketch by French painter Charles Paul Landon.

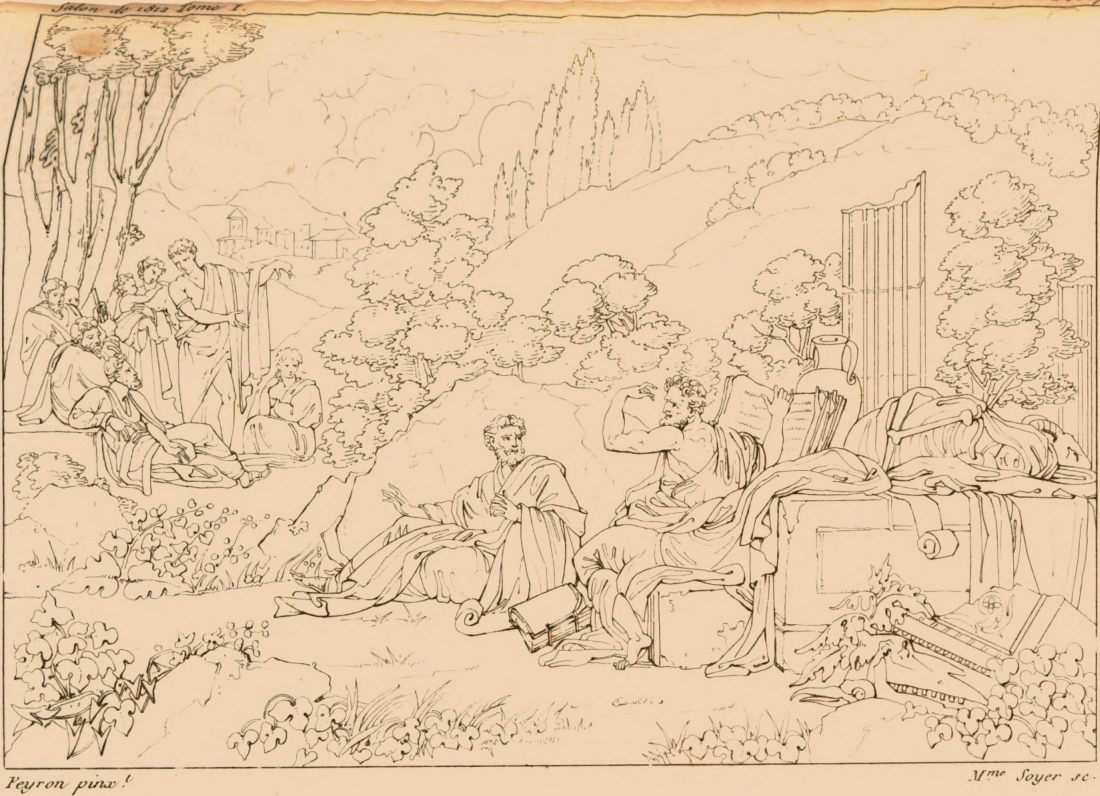
L'Entretien de Démocrite avec Hippocrate (1812). Contemporary sketch by French painter Charles Paul Landon.

== See also ==
- Neoclassicism in France
