= Salon of 1787 =

1787 art exhibition in Paris

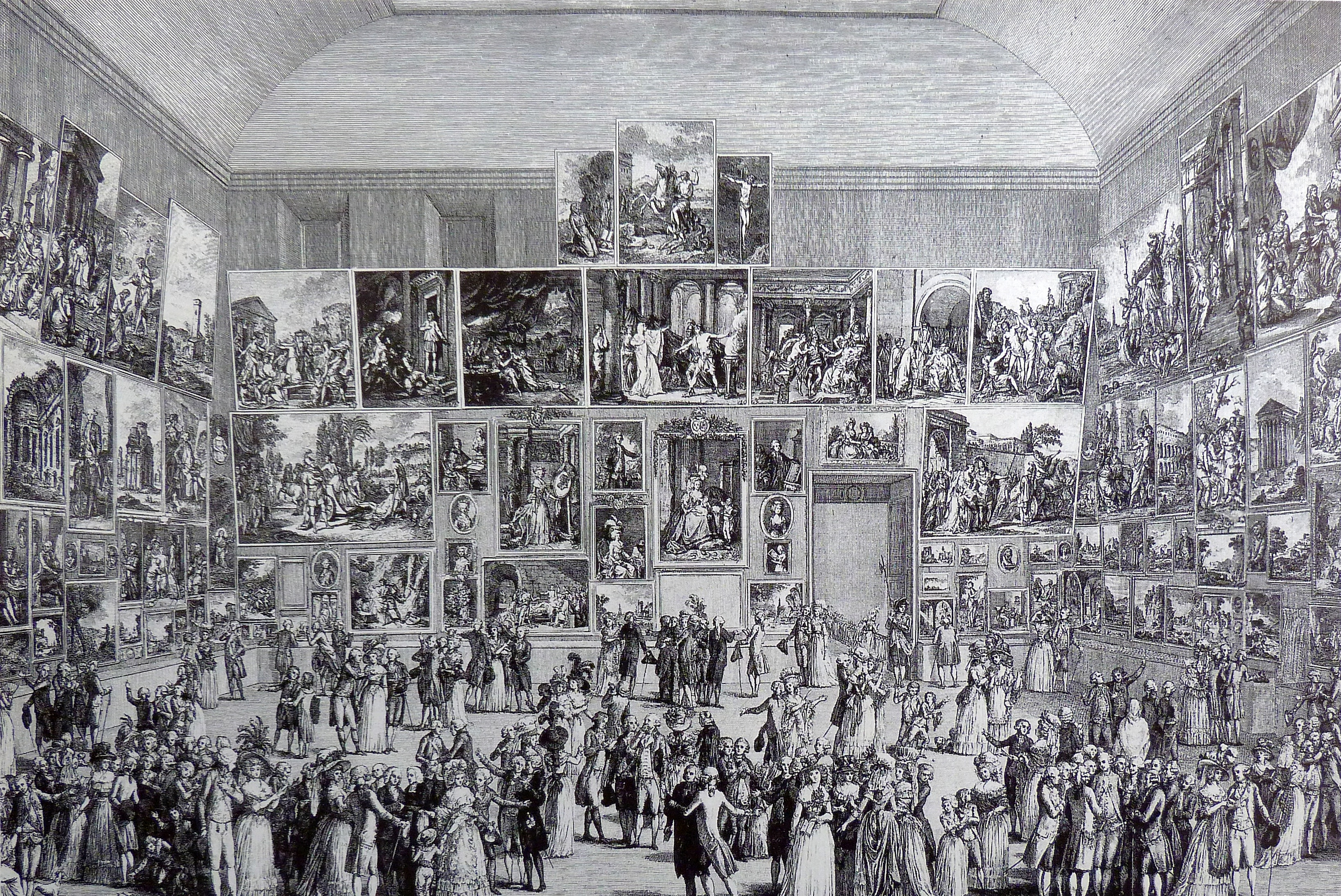
The Salon of 1787 by Pietro Antonio Martini

The Salon of 1787 was an art exhibition held at the Louvre in Paris between 25 August and 23 September 1787. It was the final Salon to take place under the Ancien Régime before the outbreak of the French Revolution two years later. Organised by the Académie Royale it featured submissions from leading painters and sculptors.

One of the most notable paintings on display was The Death of Socrates by Jacques-Louis David. A neoclassical history painting it depicts the Execution of the philosopher Socrates in Ancient Athens. A work featuring the same subject by David's rival Jean-François Pierre Peyron was also shown. Hubert Robert presented a series of four paintings known as the Principal Monuments of France, which featured the ruins of Roman architecture in Provence.

In portraiture thirty two artists displayed around a hundred works. Élisabeth Vigée Le Brun produced several notable paintings including a self-portrait with her daughter. Vigée Le Brun was noted particularly for her paintings displaying maternal love at the Salon. Her Marie Antoinette and Her Children featured the French queen, who would be guillotined six years later, with her children the future Louis XVII and Marie Thérèse of France. In sculpture Jean-Antoine Houdon exhibited busts of Prince Henry of Prussia, Lafayette and George Washington.

During the period the exhibition was biannual and has been proceeded by the Salon of 1785. It was followed by the Salon of 1789 which took place after the Storming of the Bastille.

== Gallery ==
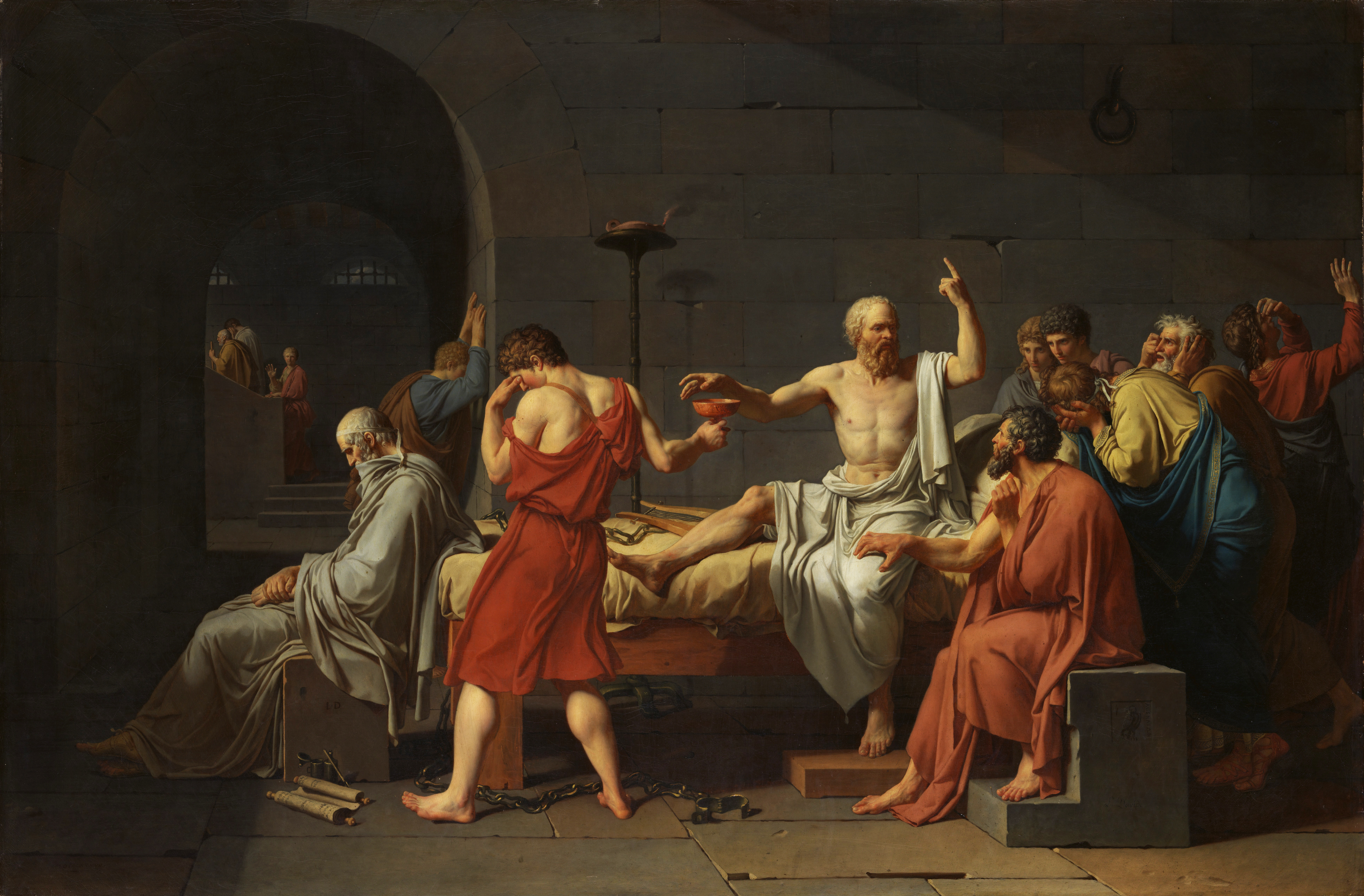
The Death of Socrates by Jacques-Louis David

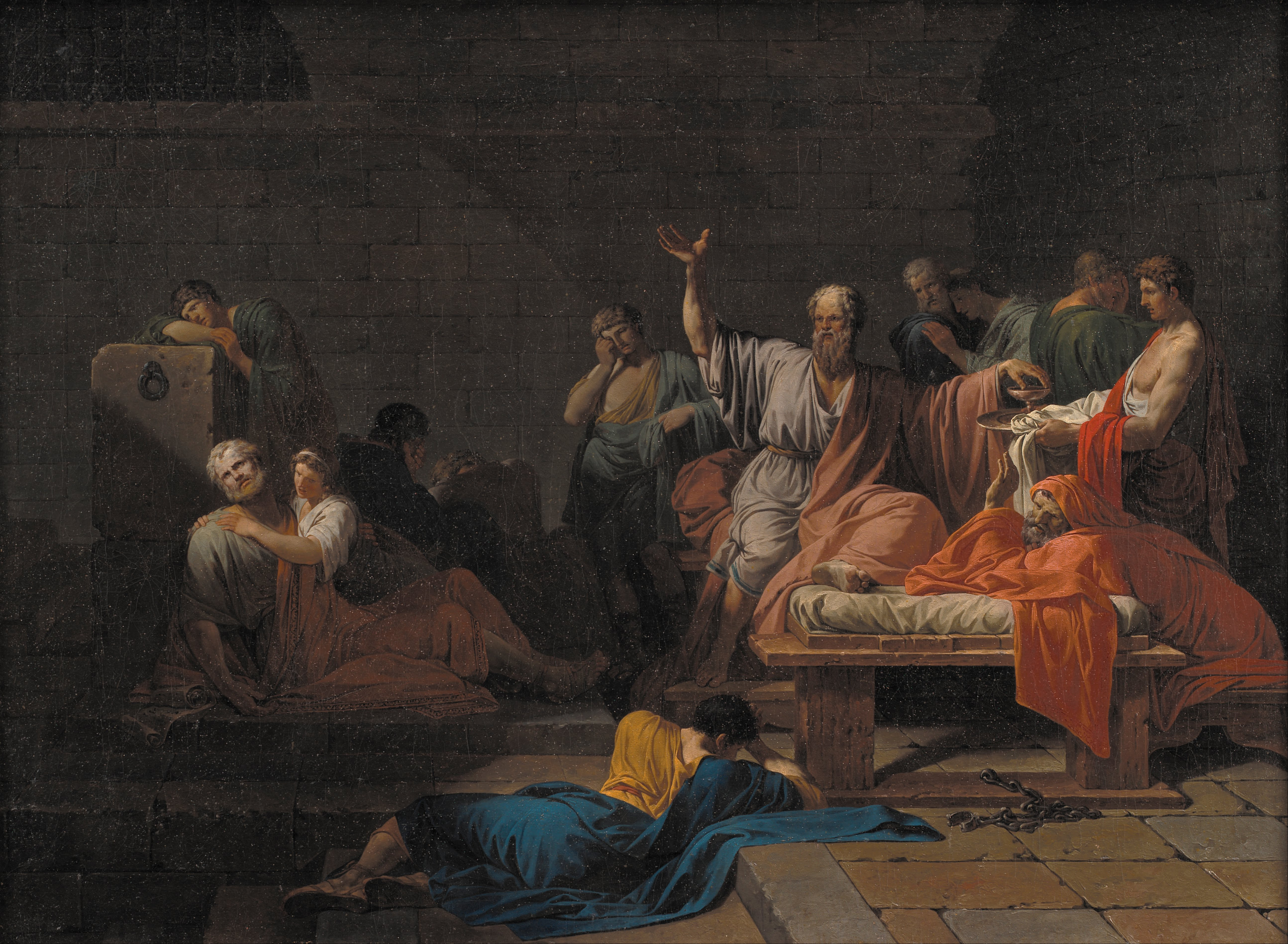
The Death of Socrates by Jean-François Pierre Peyron

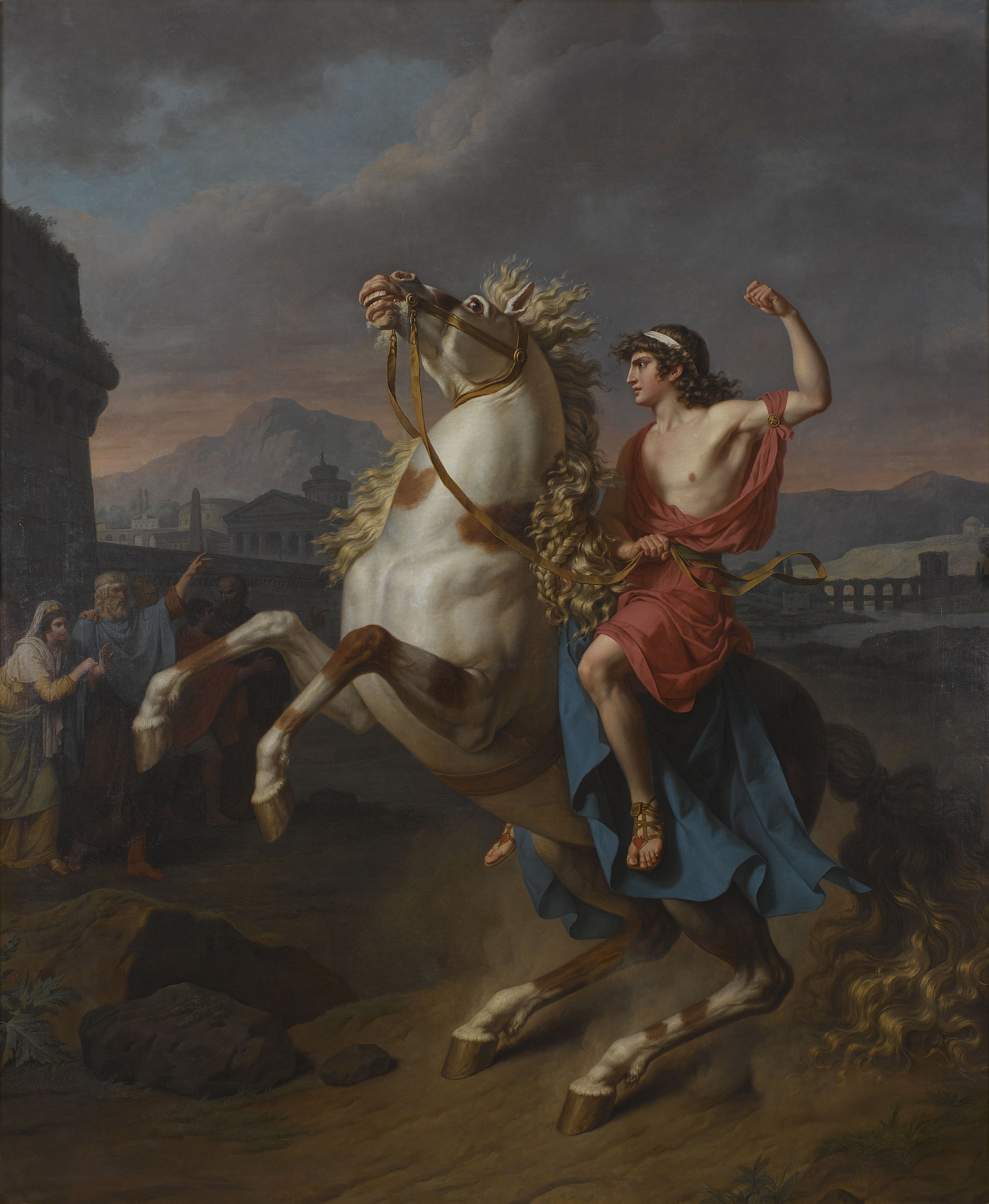
Alexander Taming Bucephalus by Nicolas-André Monsiau

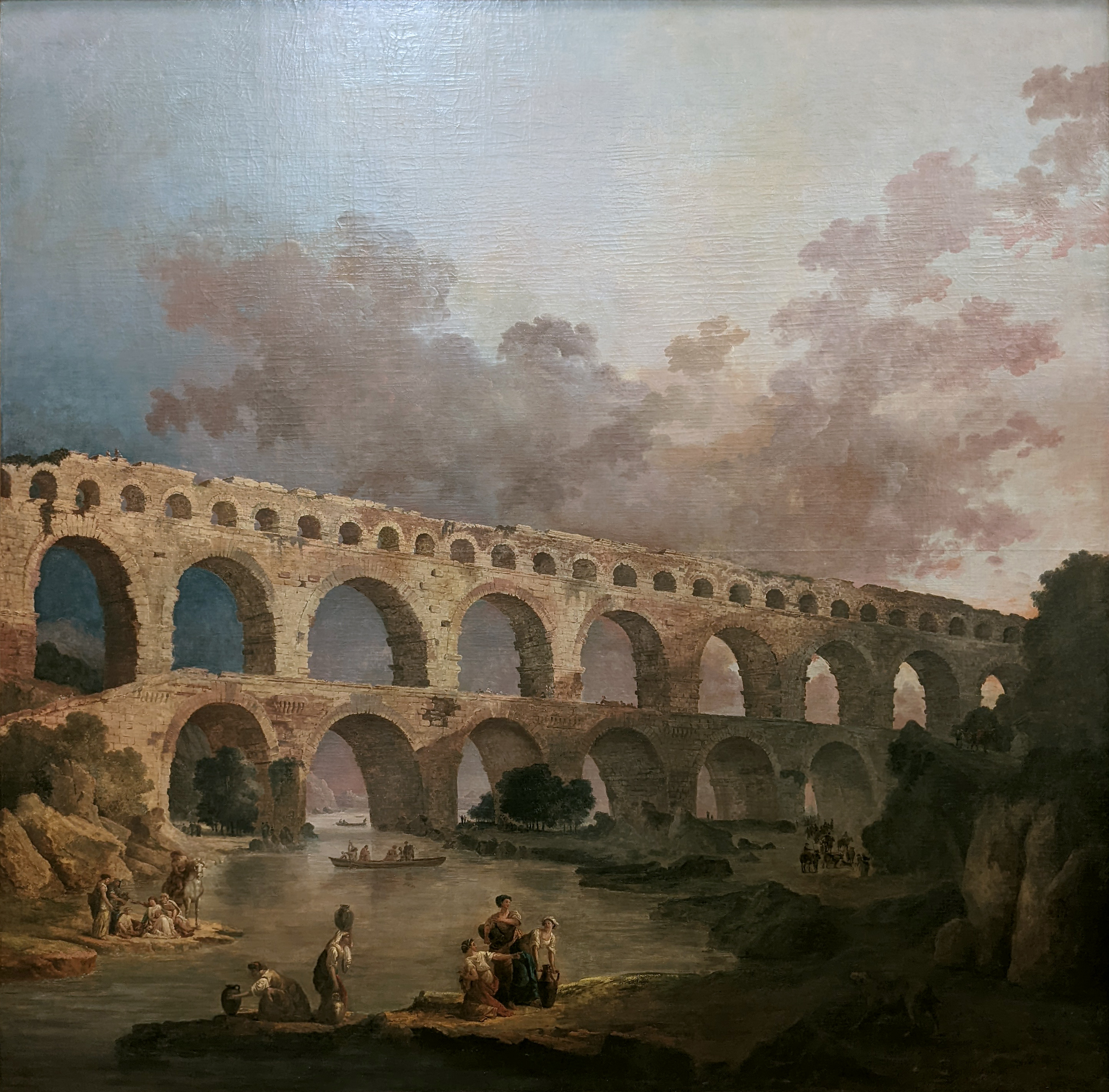
Le pont du Gard by Hubert Robert

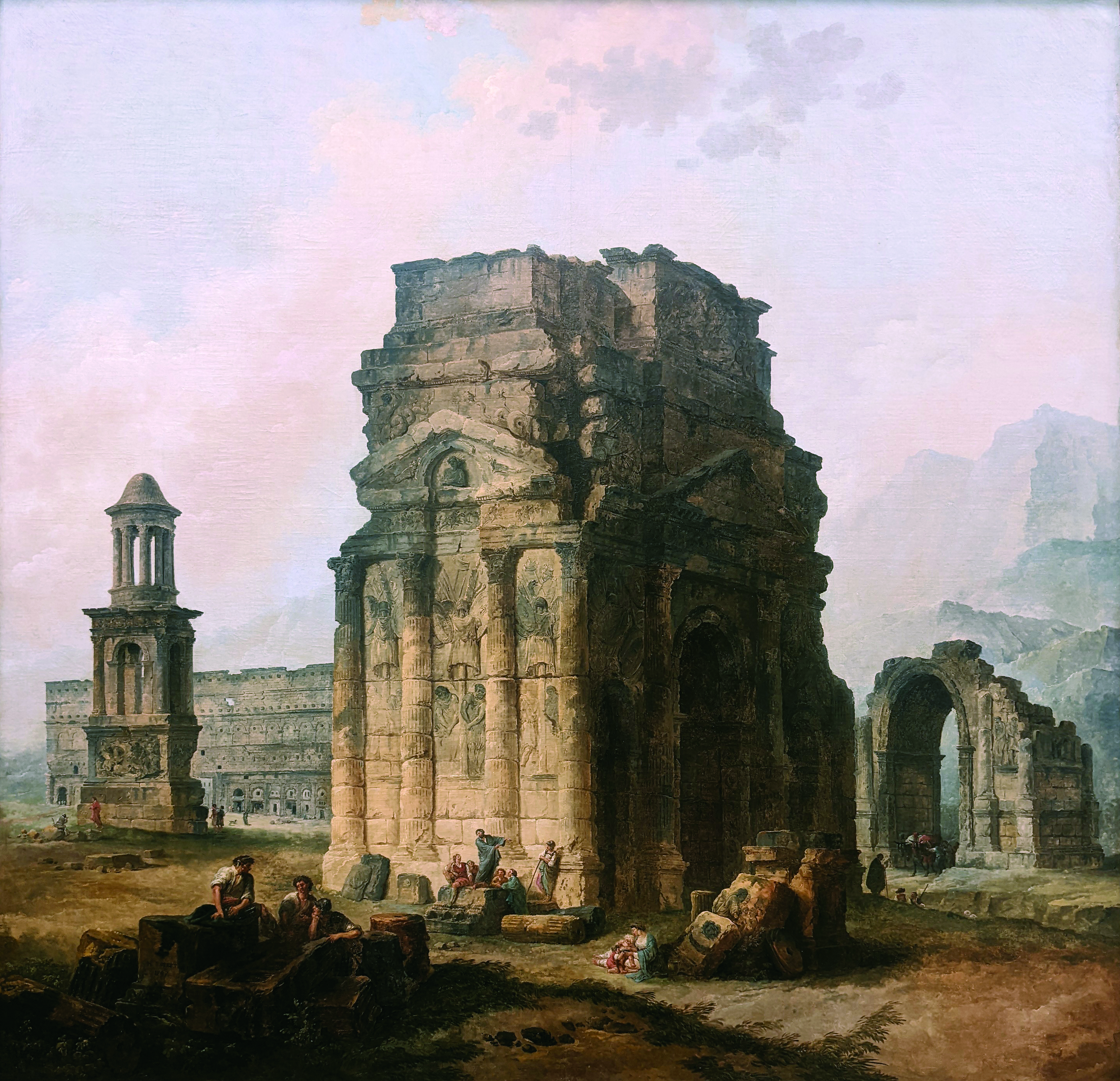
The Arc de Triomphe and the Theatre of Orange by Hubert Robert

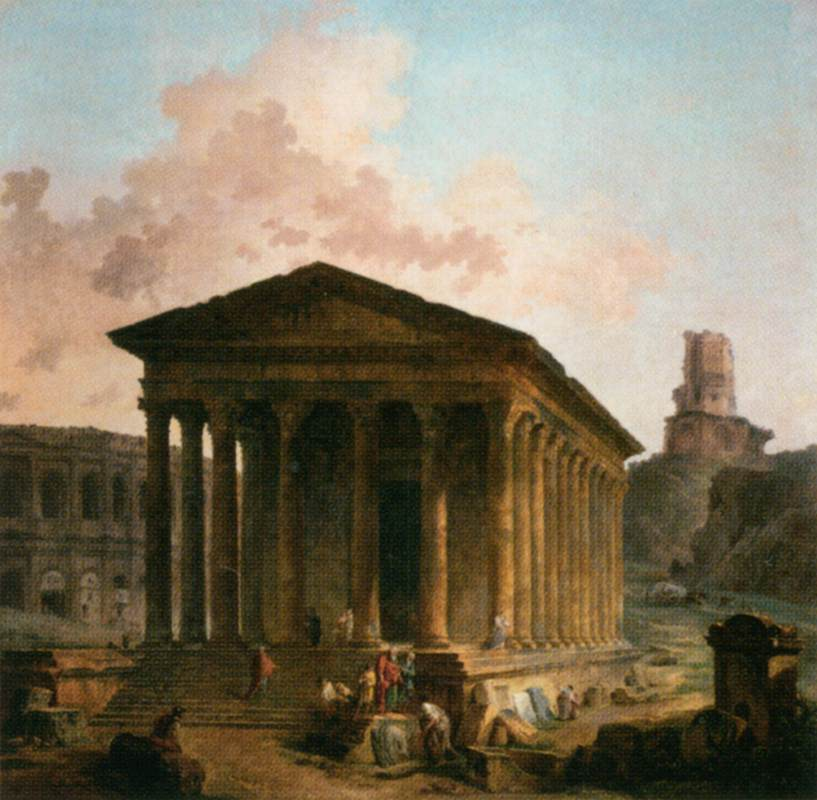
The Maison Carée, the Arenas and the Magne Tower in Nimes by Hubert Robert

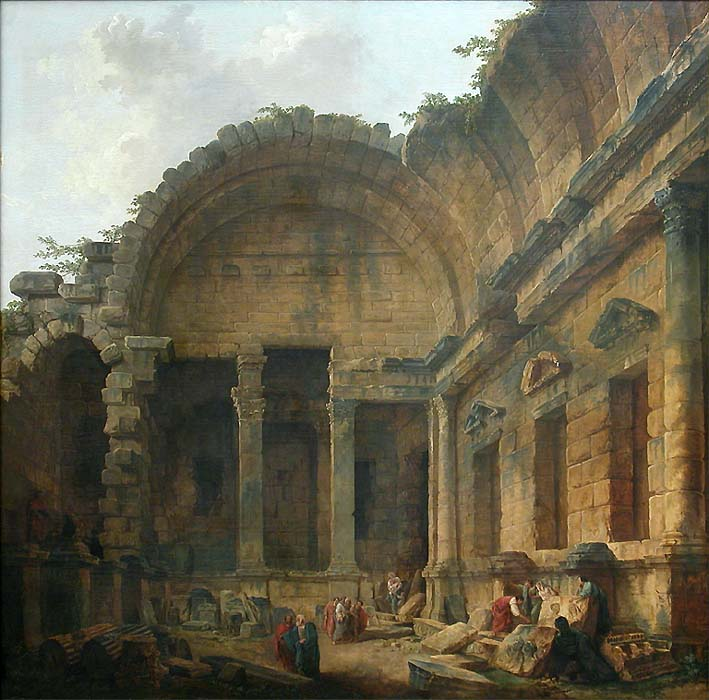
Inside the Temple of Diana in Nîmes by Hubert Robert

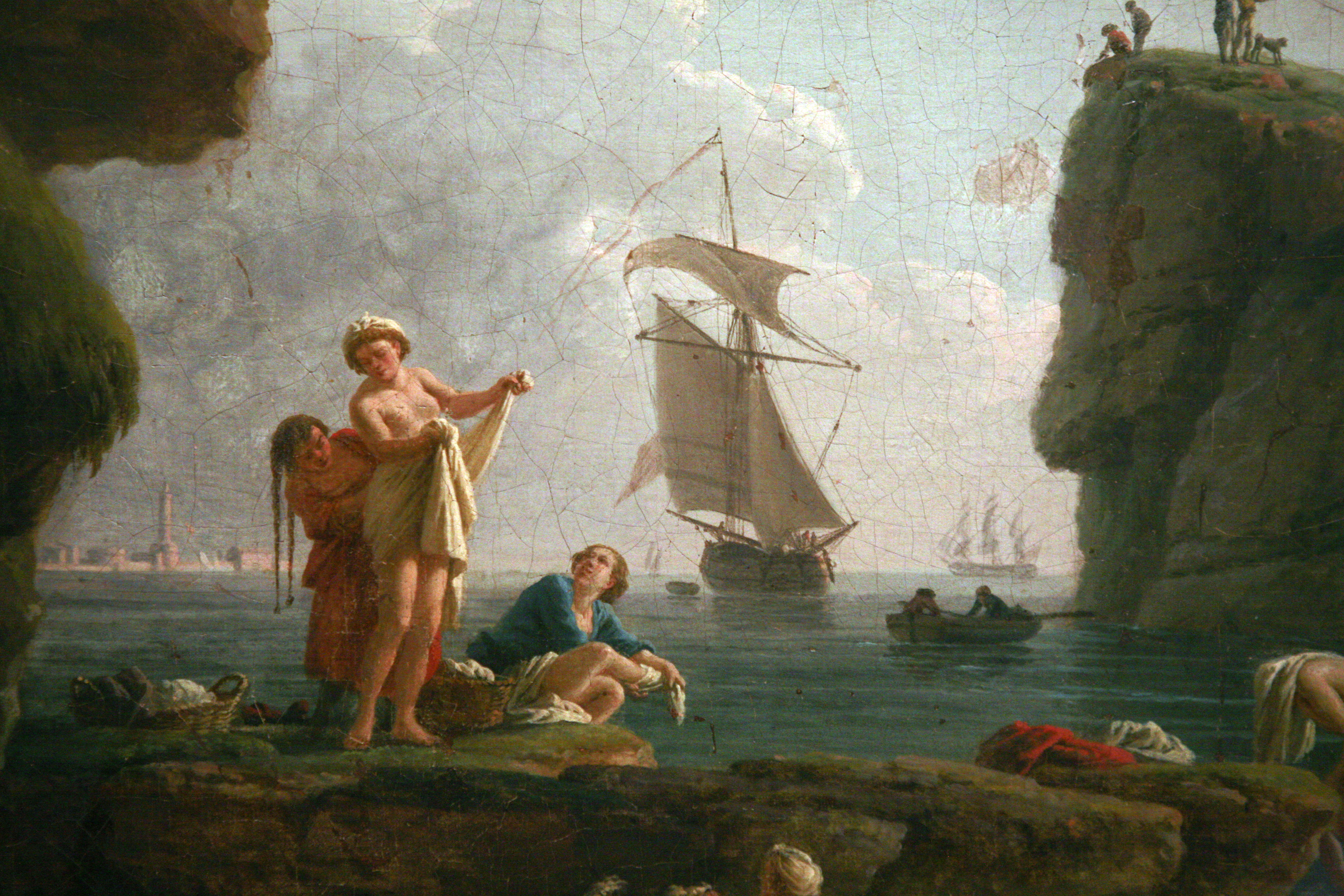
Bathers in a Cave by Joseph Vernet

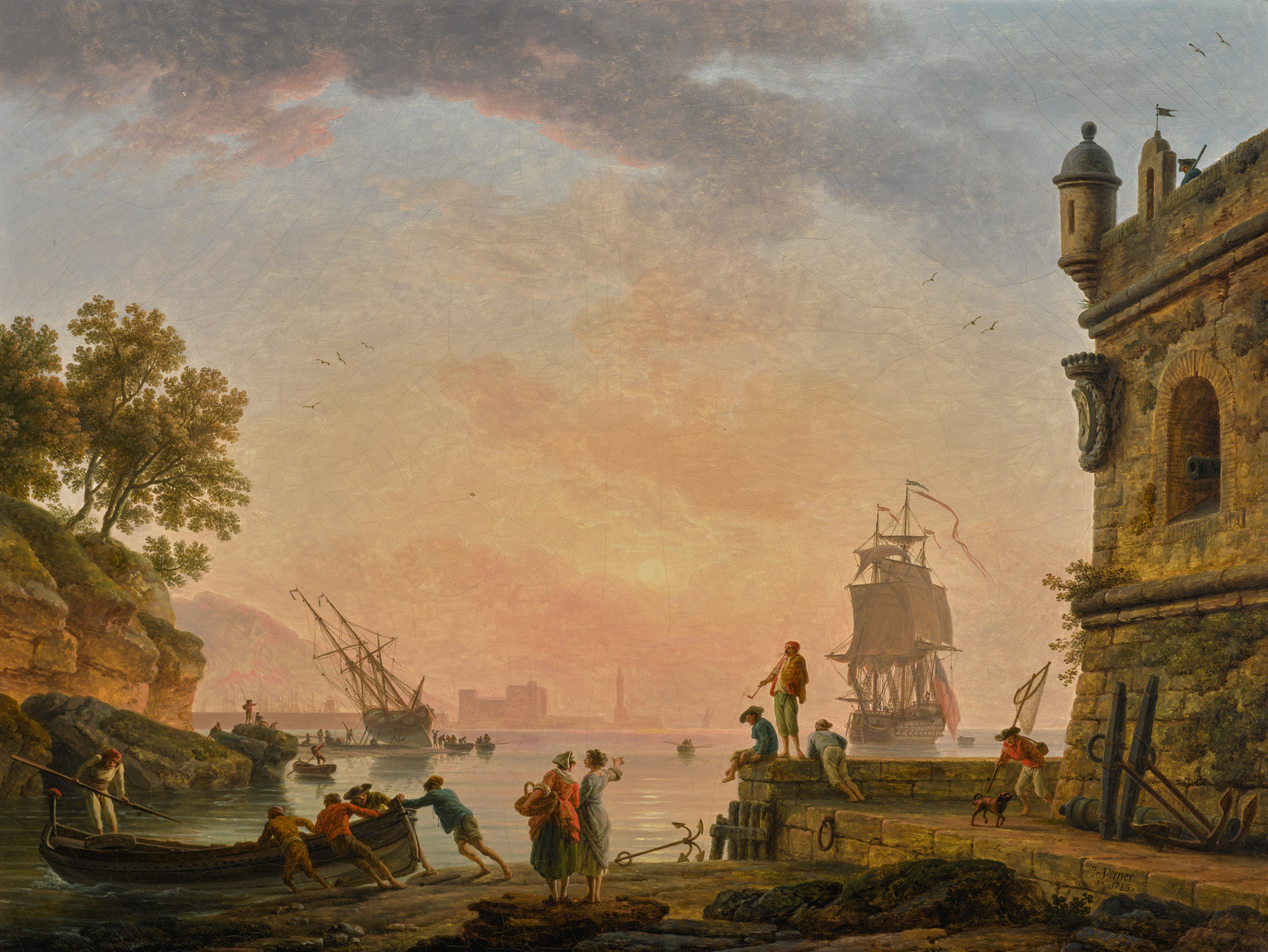
Mediterranean Harbour Scene at Sunset by Joseph Vernet

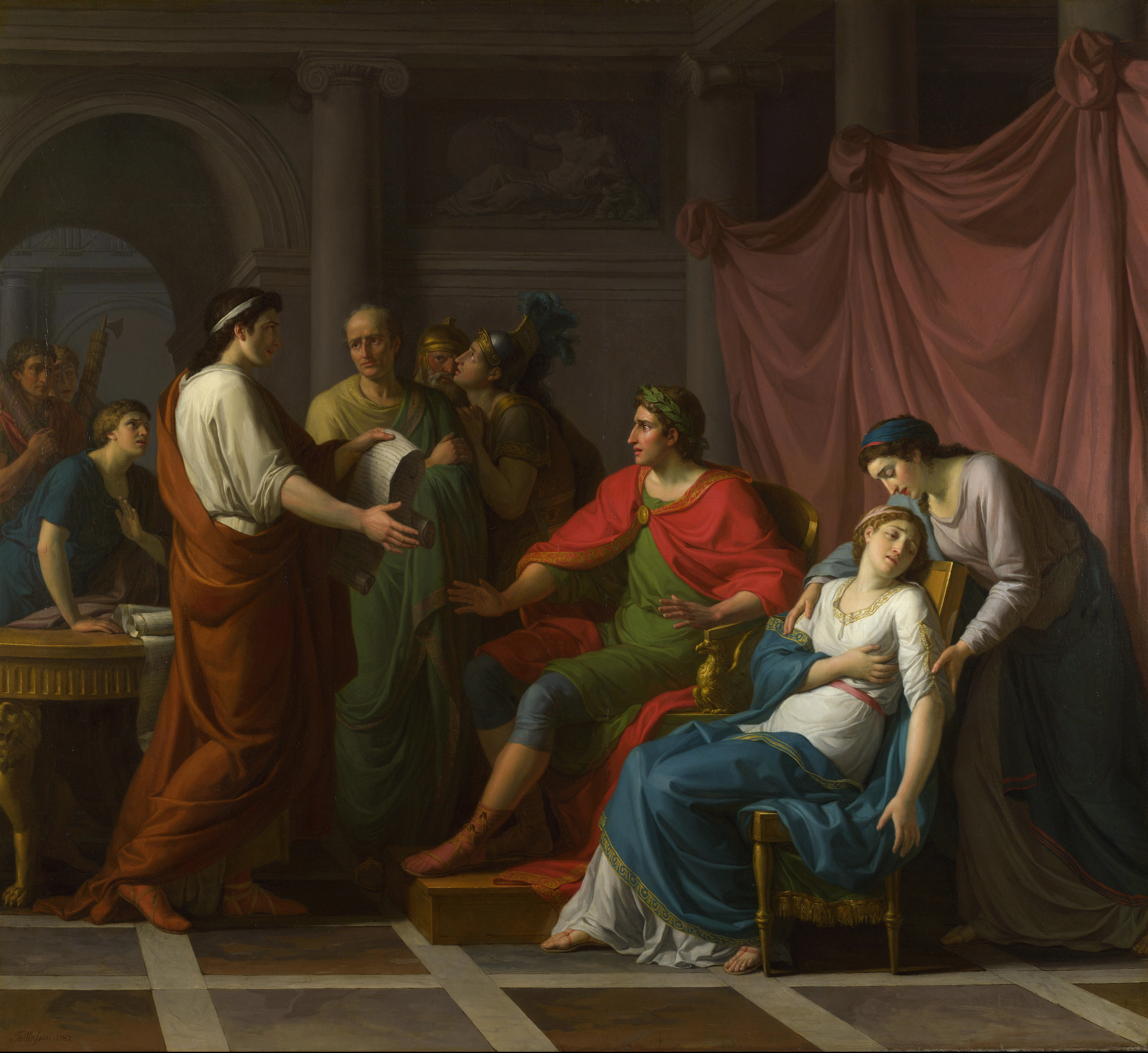
Virgil Reading the Aeneid to Augustus and Octavia by Jean-Joseph Taillasson

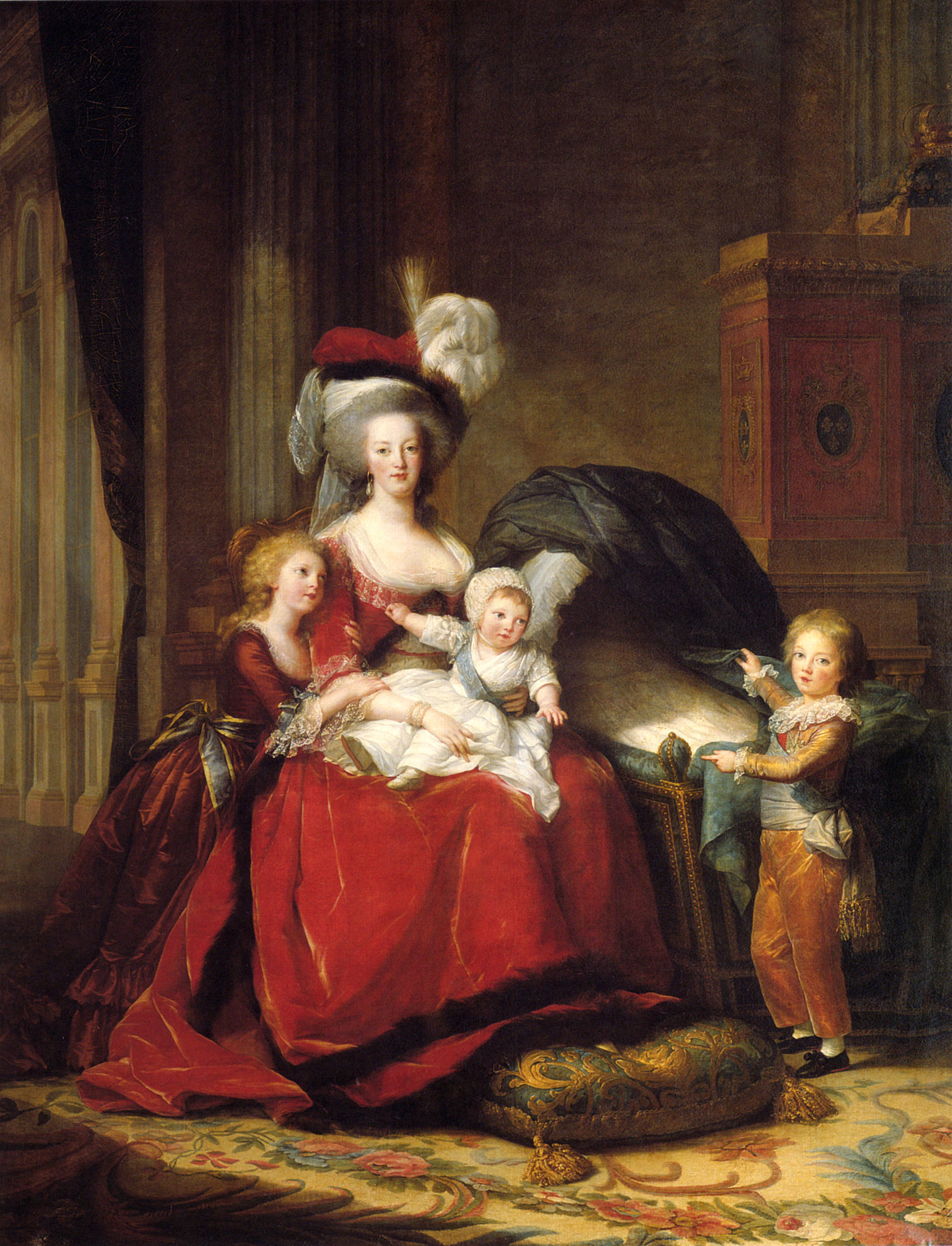
Marie Antoinette and Her Children by Élisabeth Vigée Le Brun

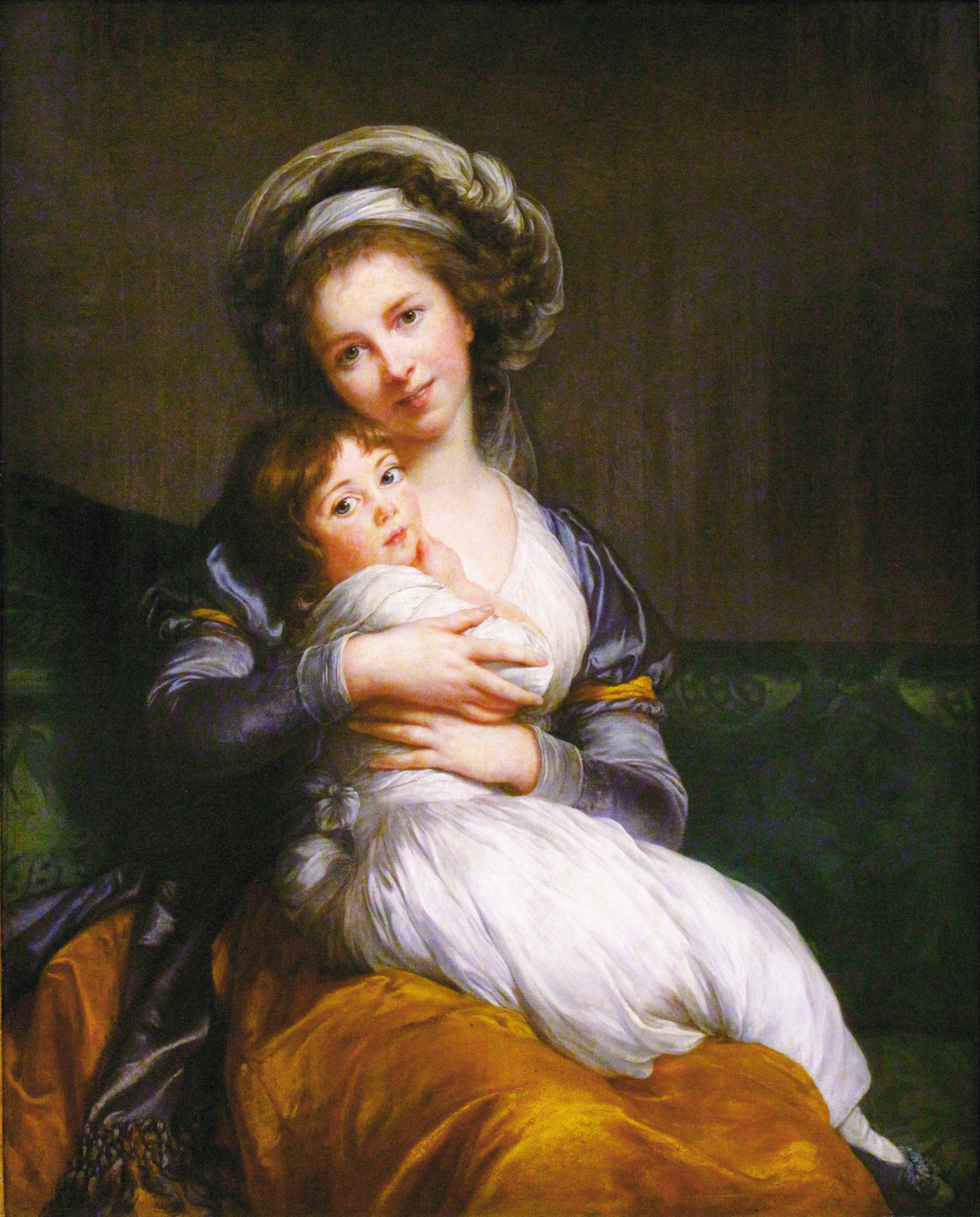
Self-portrait with her Daughter, Julie by Élisabeth Vigée Le Brun

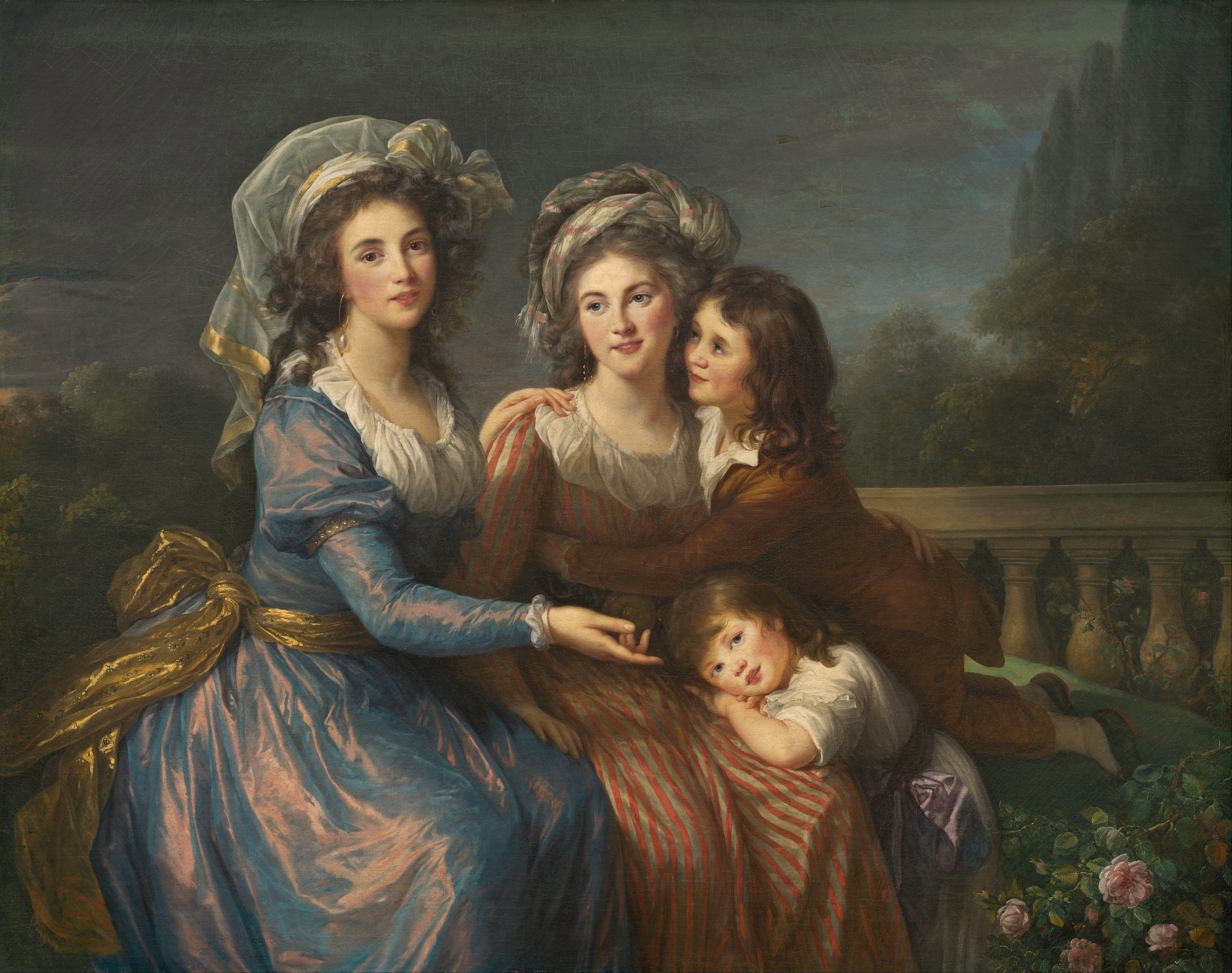
The Marquise de Pezay, and the Marquise de Rougé with Her Sons Alexis and Adrien by Élisabeth Vigée Le Brun

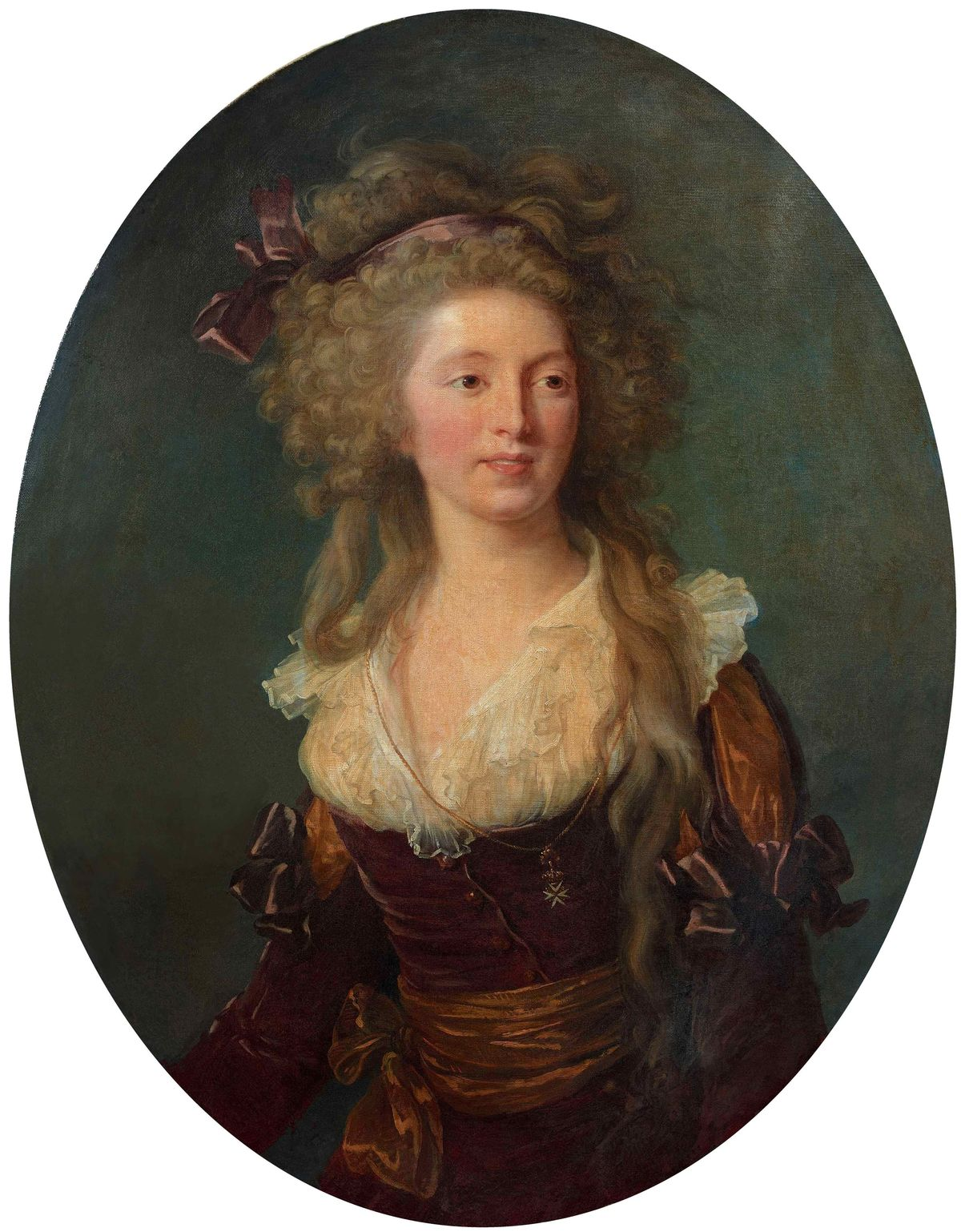
Portrait of the Comtesse de Béon by Élisabeth Vigée Le Brun

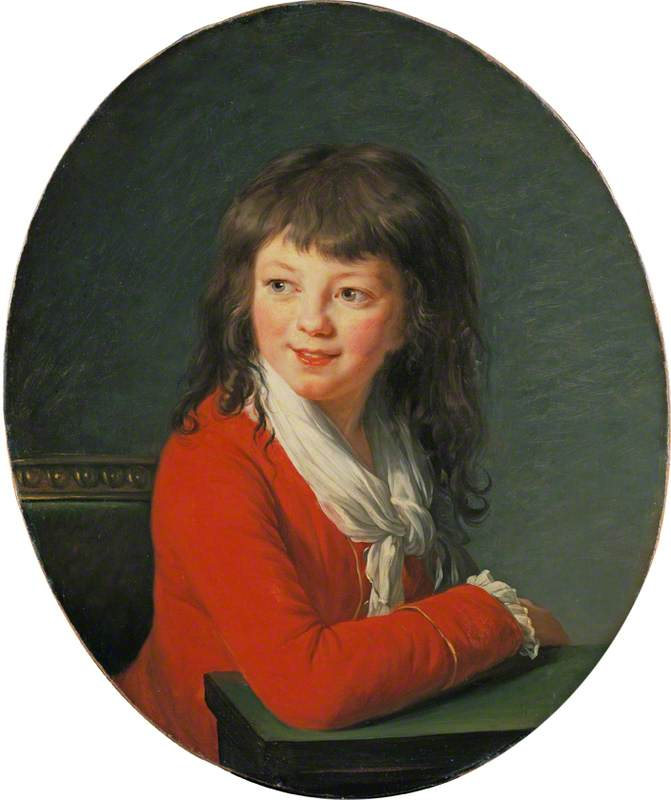
Portrait of the Comte d'Espagnac by Élisabeth Vigée Le Brun

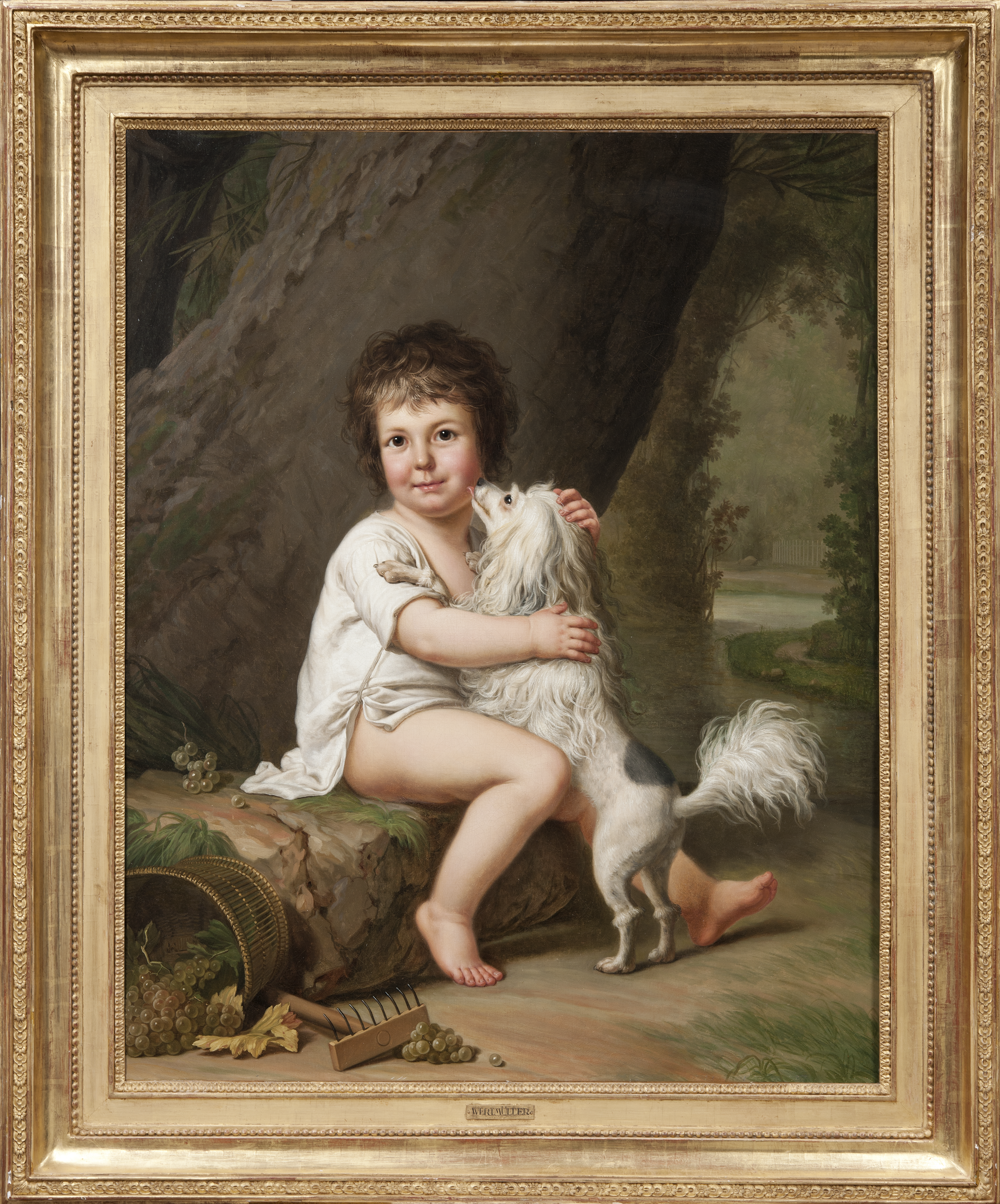
Portrait of Henri Bertholet-Campan by Adolf Ulrik Wertmüller

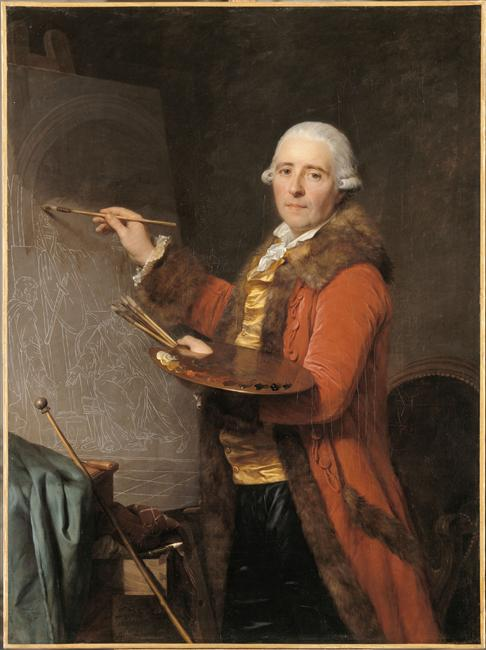
Portrait of Nicolas-Guy Brenet by Antoine Vestier

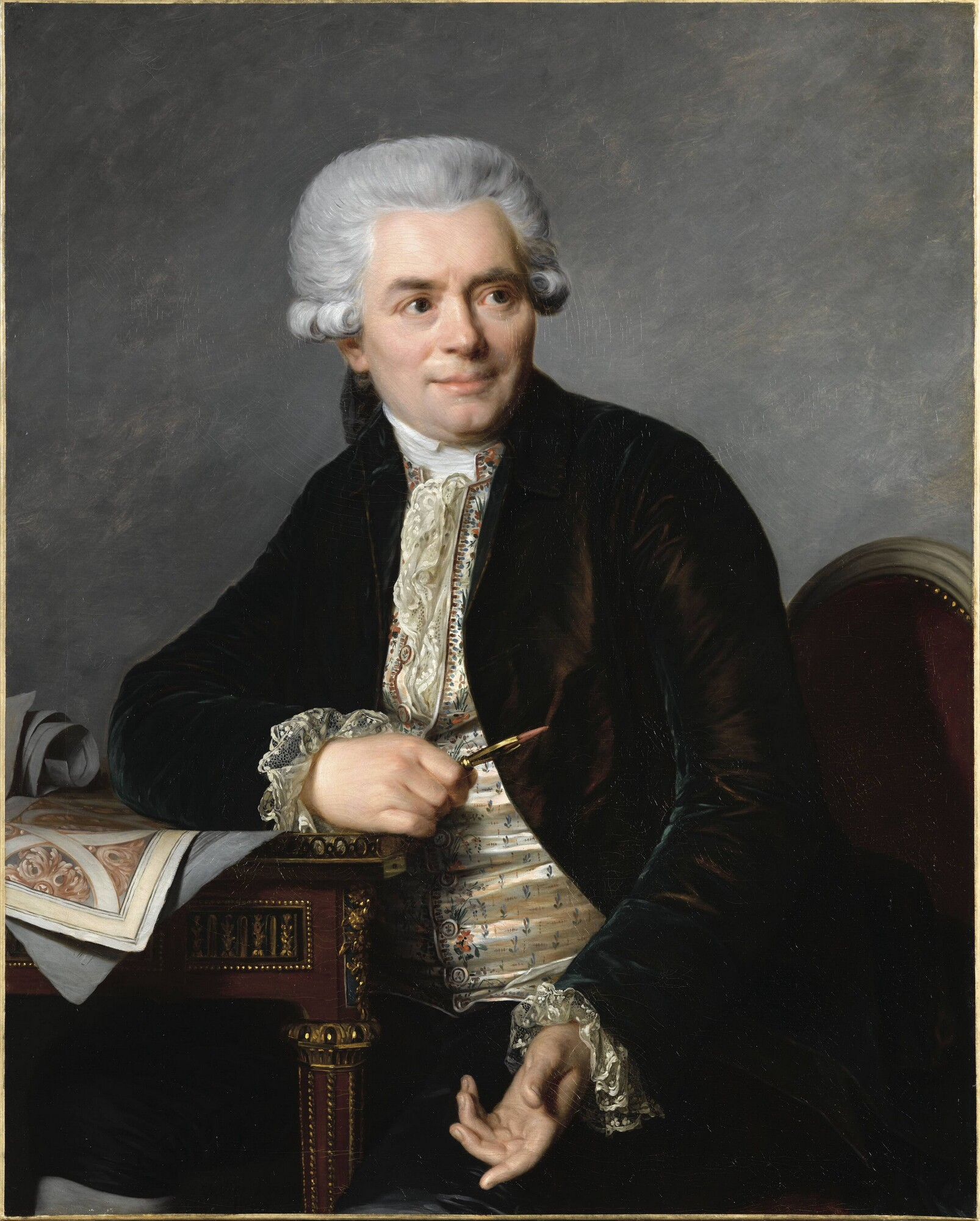
Portrait of Jean Henri Riesener by Antoine Vestier

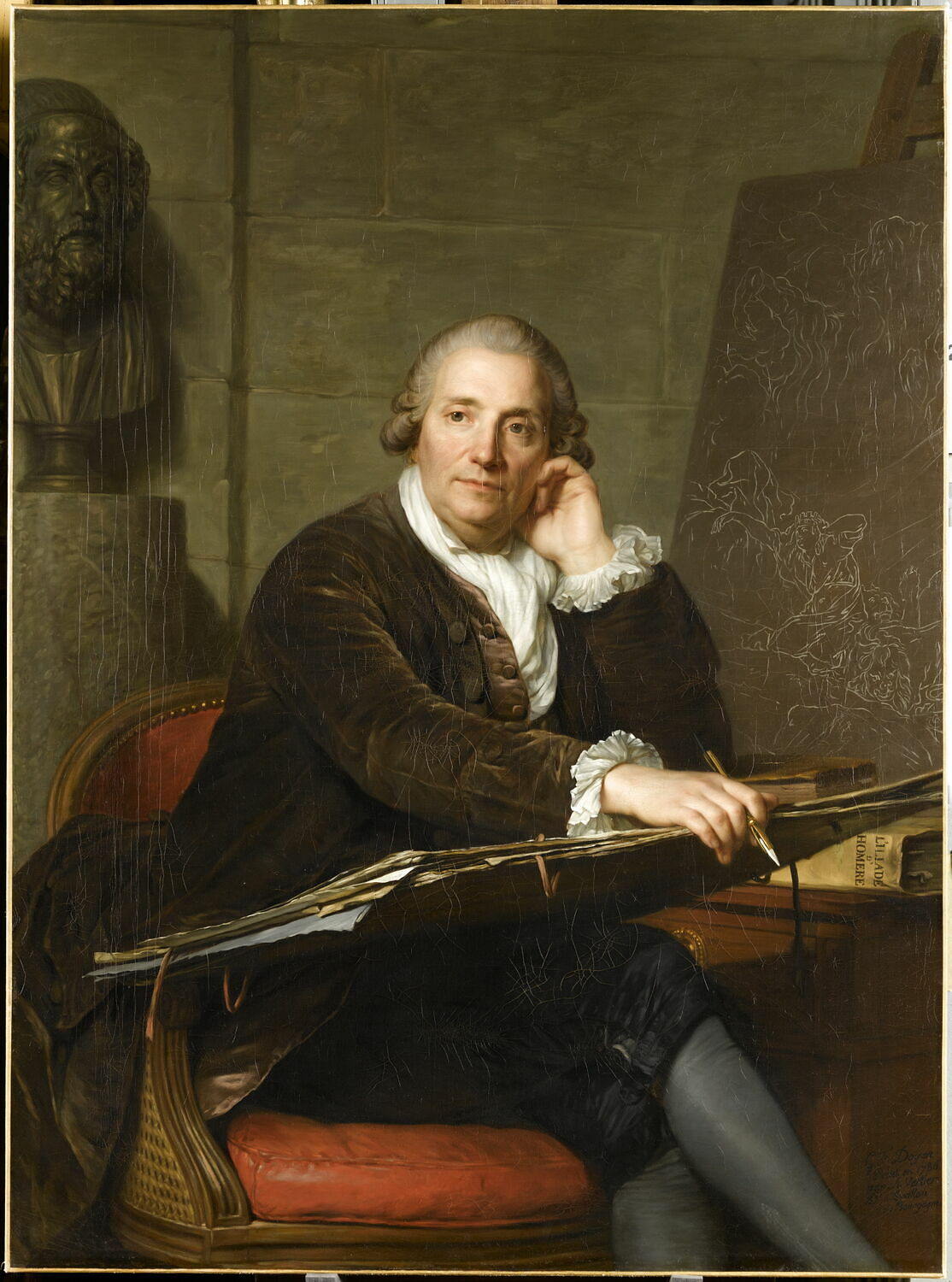
Portrait of Gabriel-François Doyen by Antoine Vestier

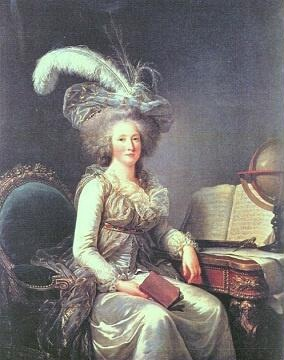
Portrait of Madame Élisabeth by Adélaïde Labille-Guiard

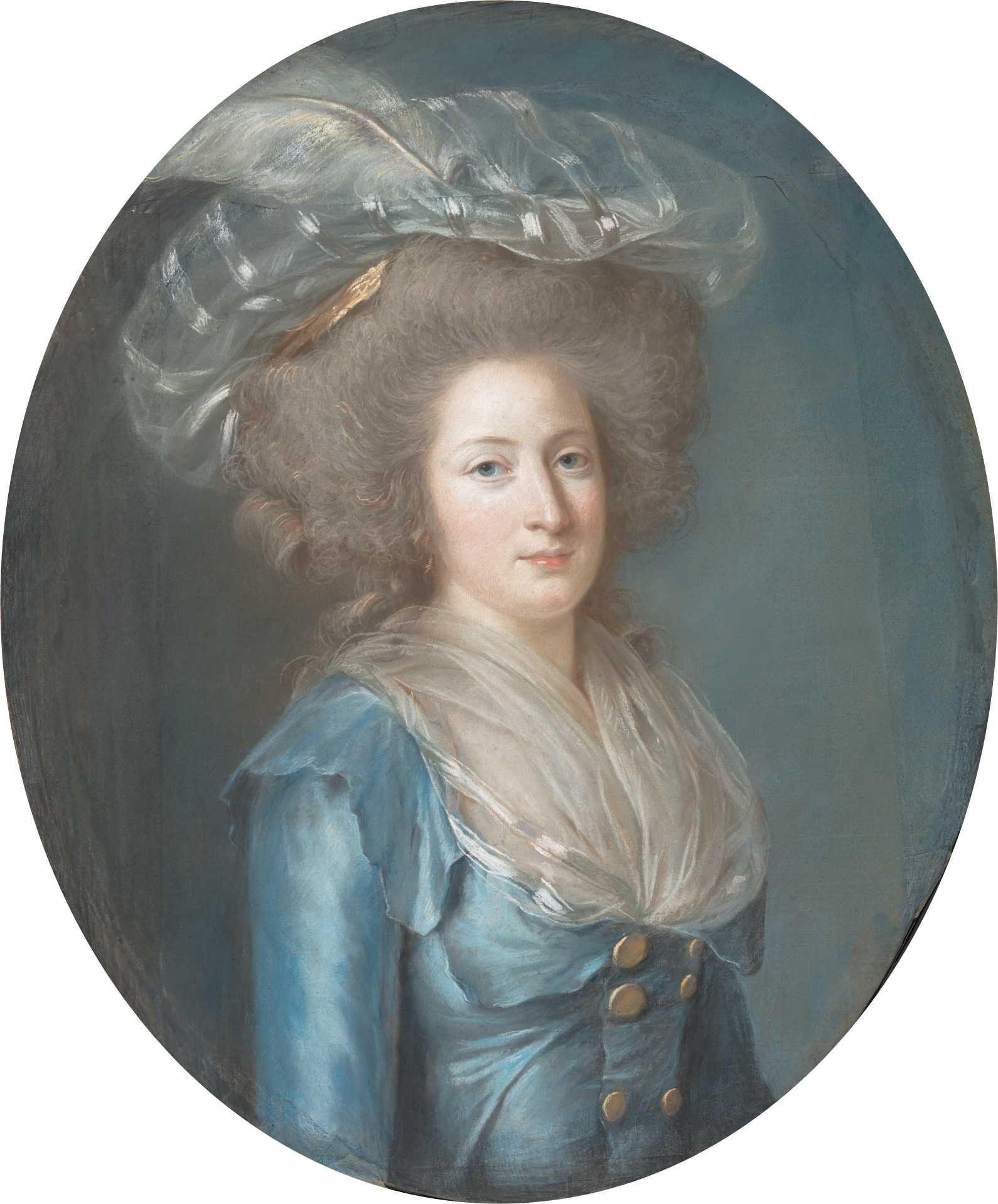
Madame Élisabeth de France by Adélaïde Labille-Guiard

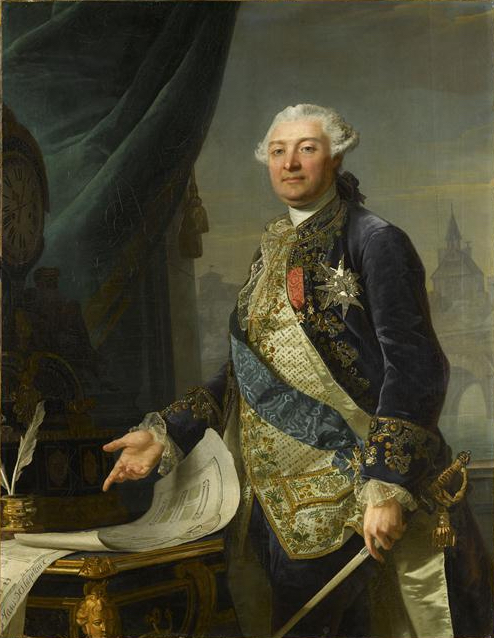
Portrait of Louis Auguste Le Tonnelier de Breteuil by Jean-Laurent Mosnier

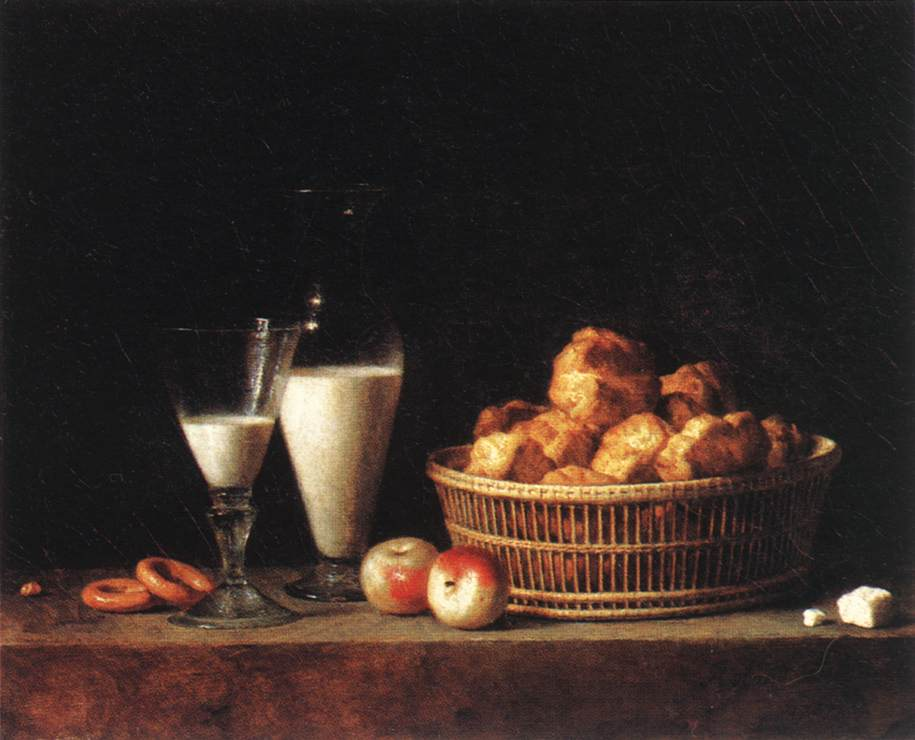
Still-Life with a Carafe of Barley Wine by Henri-Horace Roland Delaporte

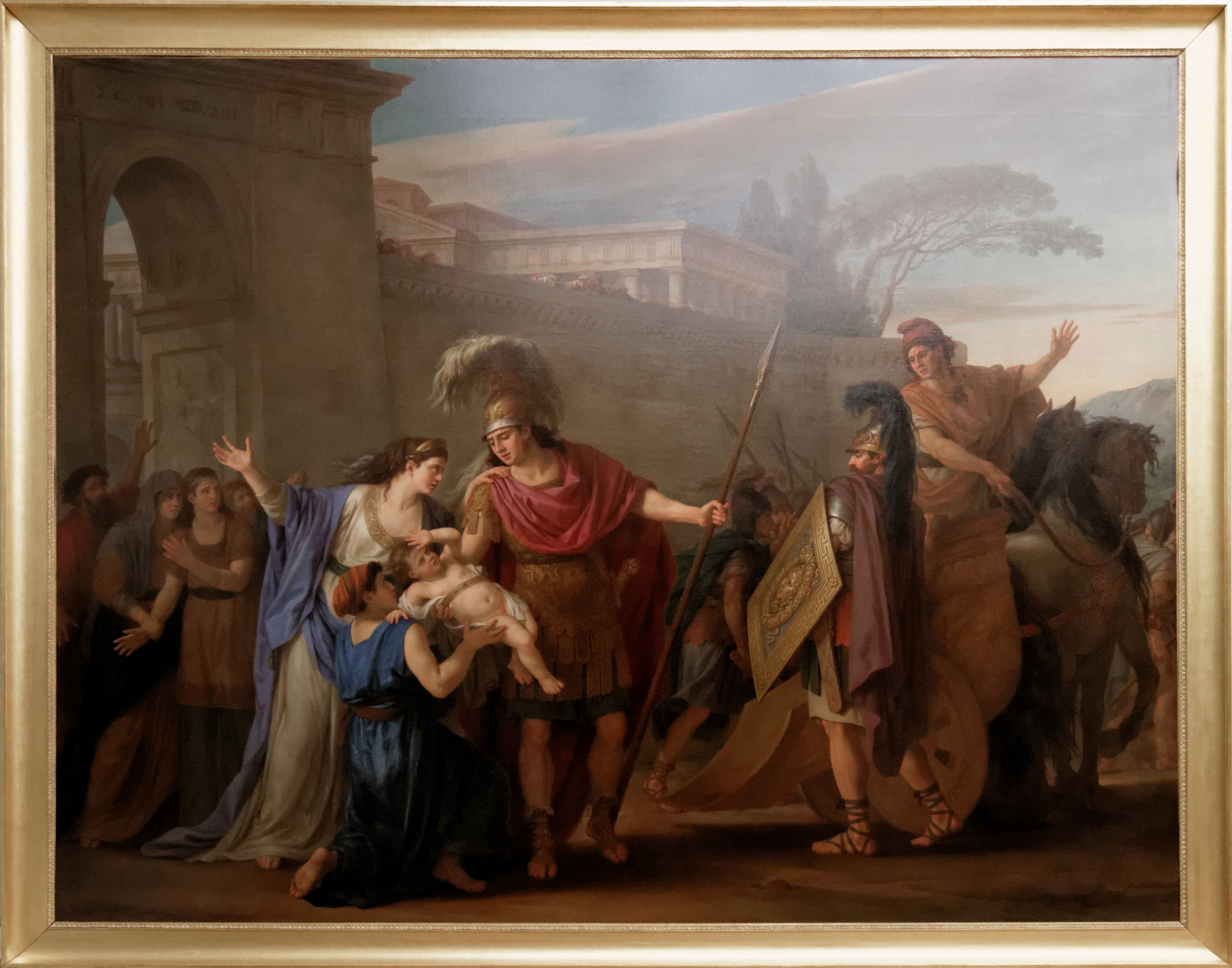
The Farewell of Hector and Andromache by Joseph-Marie Vien

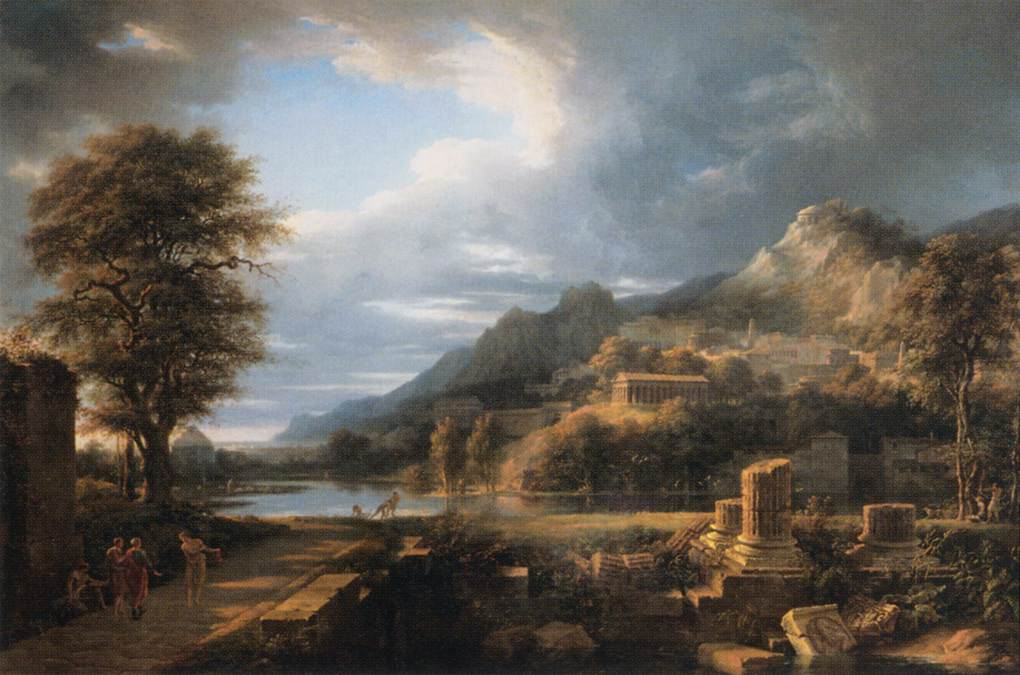
The Ancient City of Agrigento by Pierre-Henri de Valenciennes

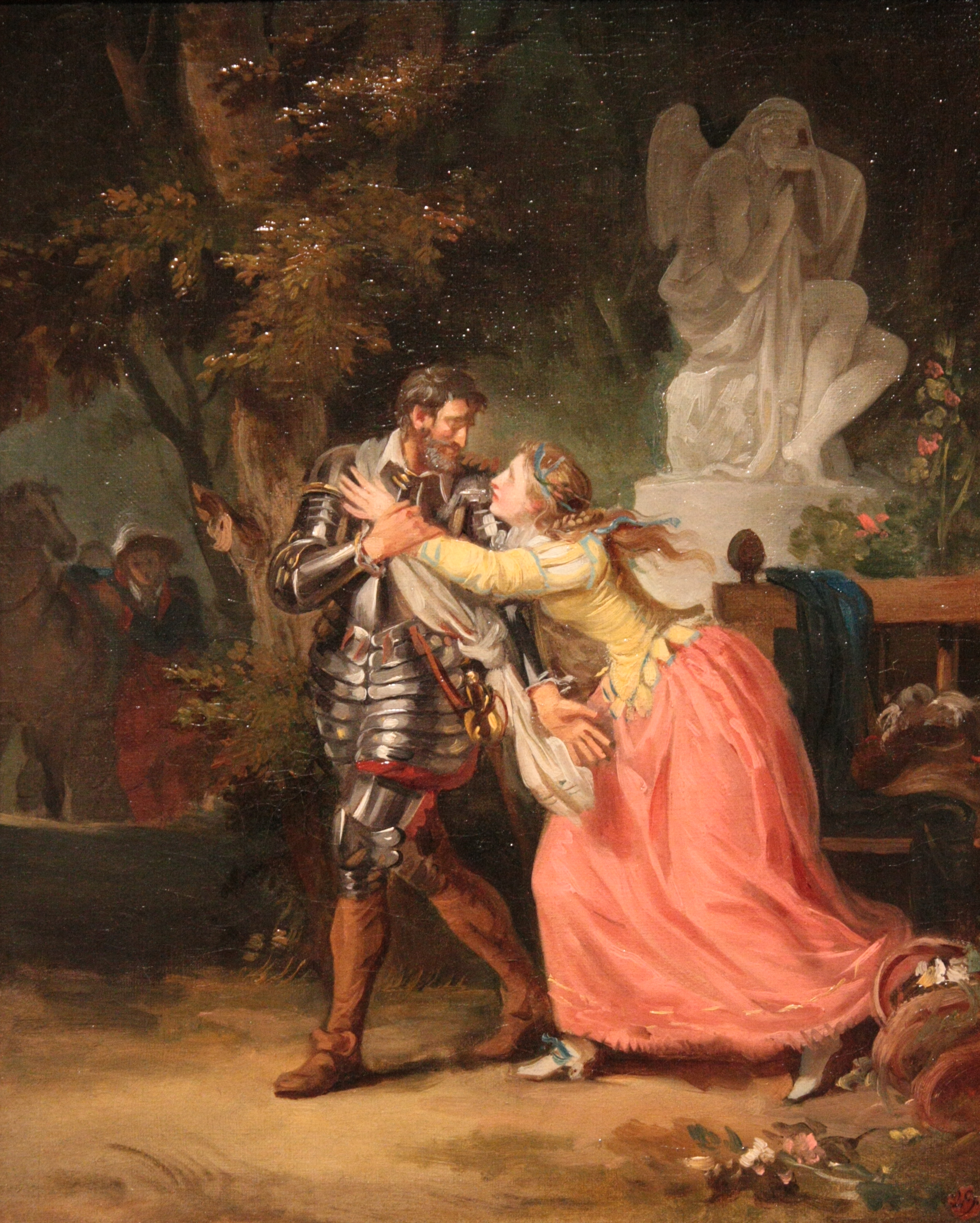
The Farewell of Henry IV and Gabrielle d'Estrées by François-André Vincent

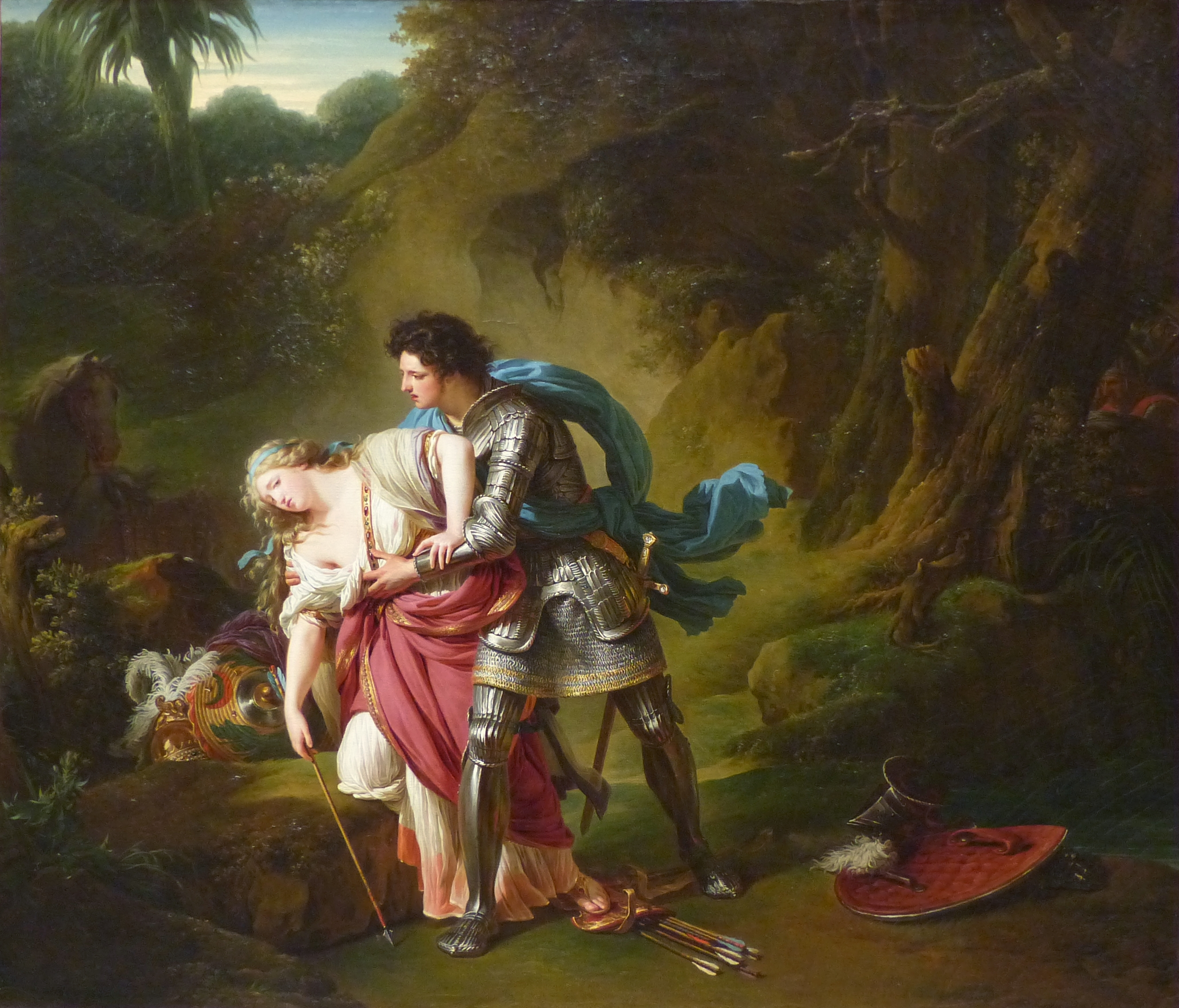
Renaud and Armide by François-André Vincent

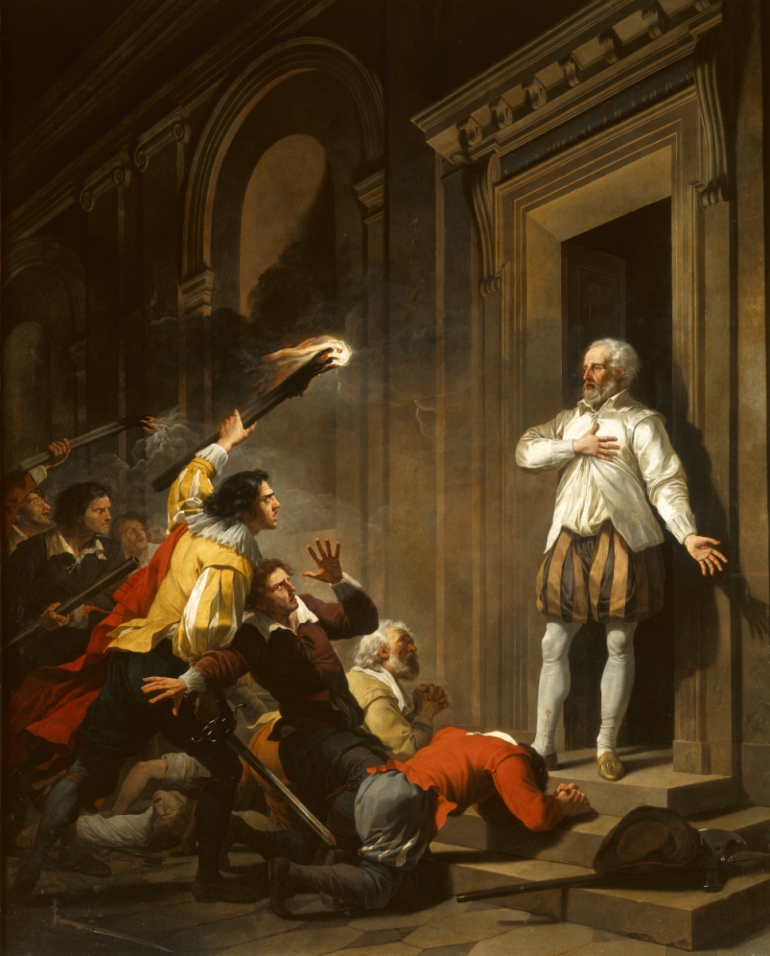
Admiral Coligny Confronts His Assassins by Joseph-Benoît Suvée

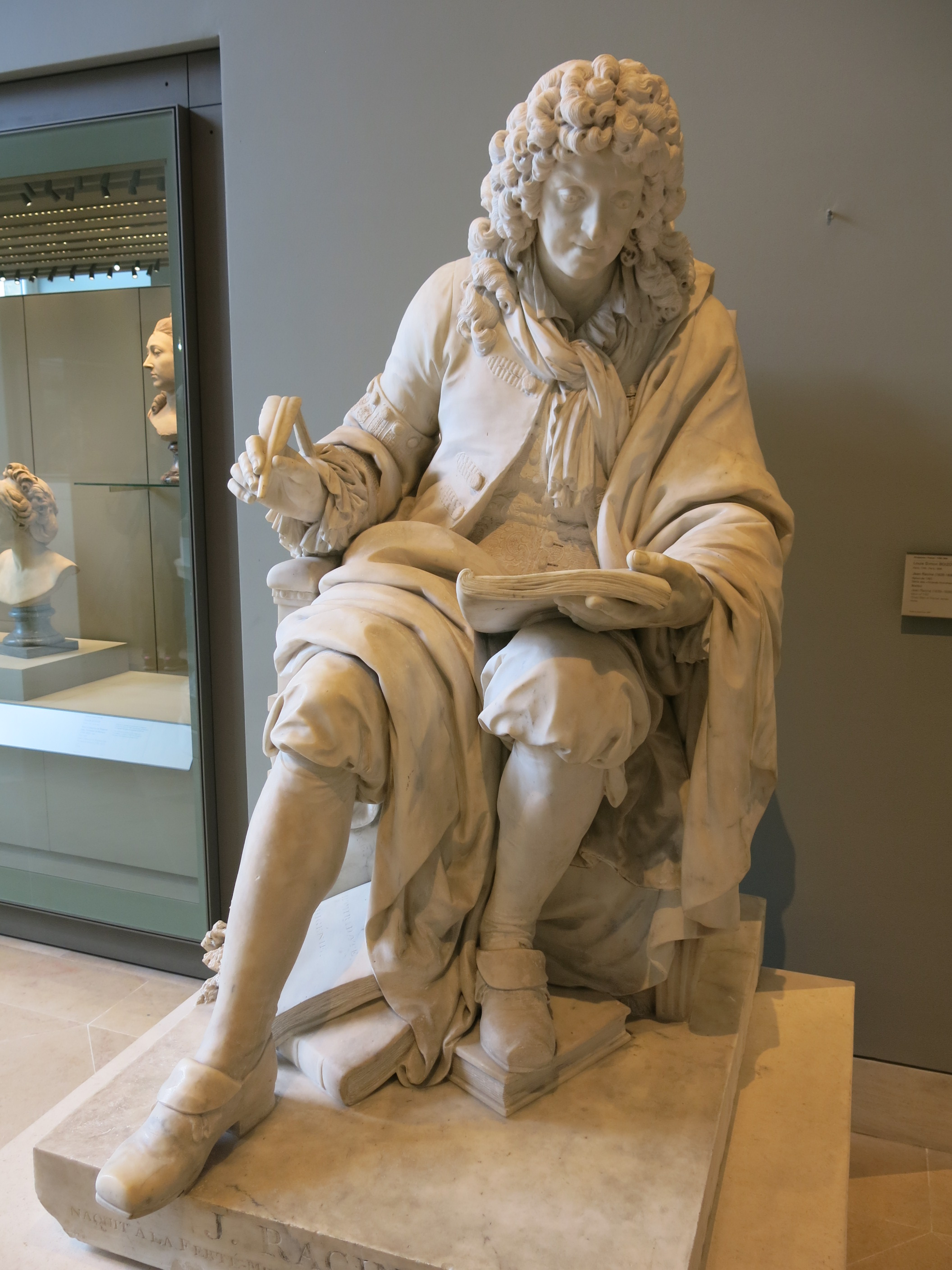
Statue of Jean Racine by Louis-Simon Boizot

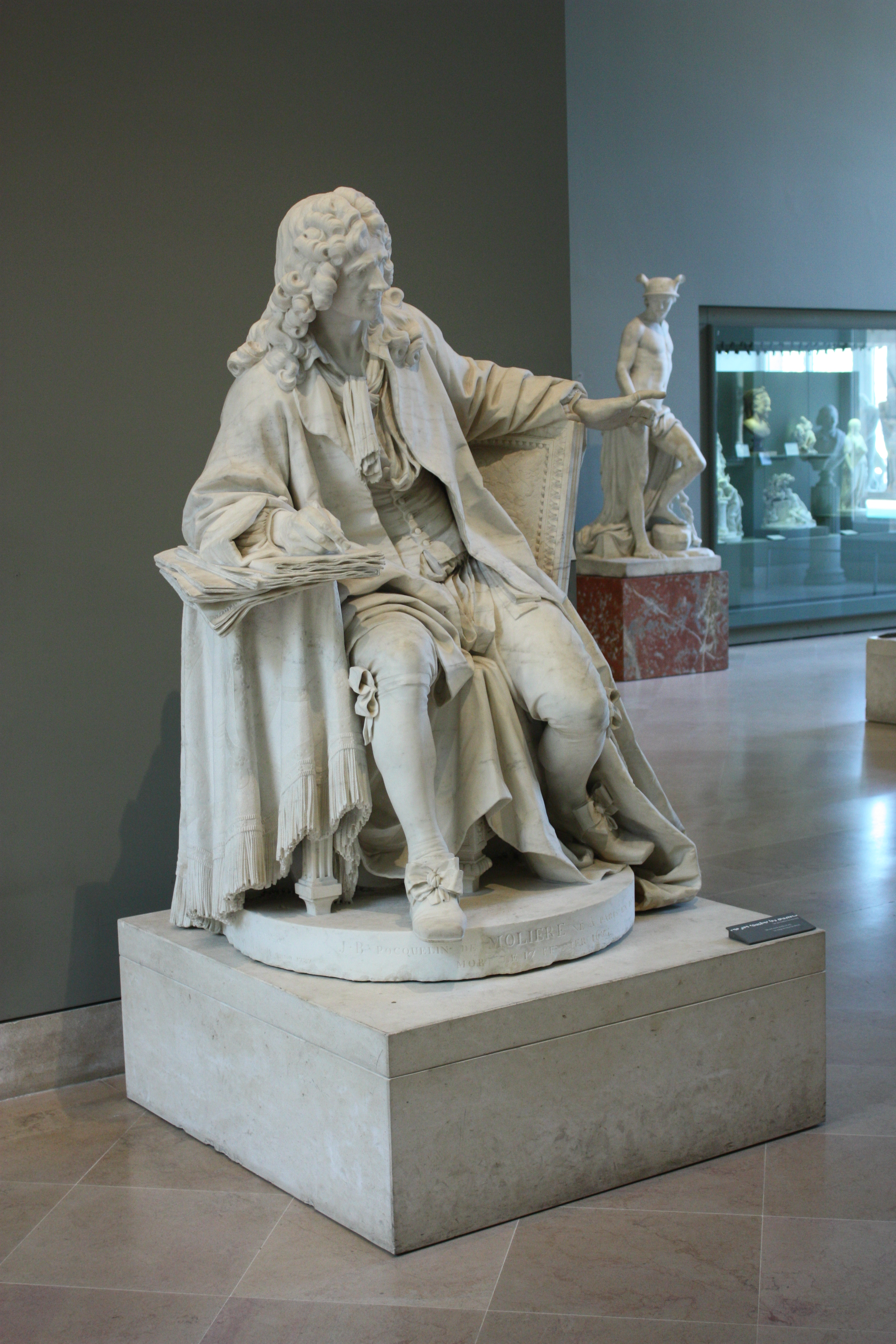
Statue of Molière by Jean-Jacques Caffieri

== See also ==
- Category:Artworks exhibited at the Salon of 1787

== Bibliography ==
- Freund, Amy. Portraiture and Politics in Revolutionary France. Penn State University Press, 2014.
- Levey, Michael. Painting and Sculpture in France, 1700-1789. Yale University Press, 1993.
- Marandel, Patrice. Europe in the Age of Enlightenment and Revolution. Metropolitan Museum of Art, 1987.
- Poulet, Anne L. Jean-Antoine Houdon: Sculptor of the Enlightenment. University of Chicago Press, 2003.
- Sheriff, Mary D. The Exceptional Woman: Elisabeth Vigee-Lebrun and the Cultural Politics of Art. University of Chicago Press, 1997.
- Walker, Leslie H. A Mother's Love: Crafting Feminine Virtue in Enlightenment France. Associated University Presse, 2008.
