= Self-Portrait Painting Marie Antoinette =

1790 painting by Elisabeth Louise Vigée Le Brun

Self-Portrait
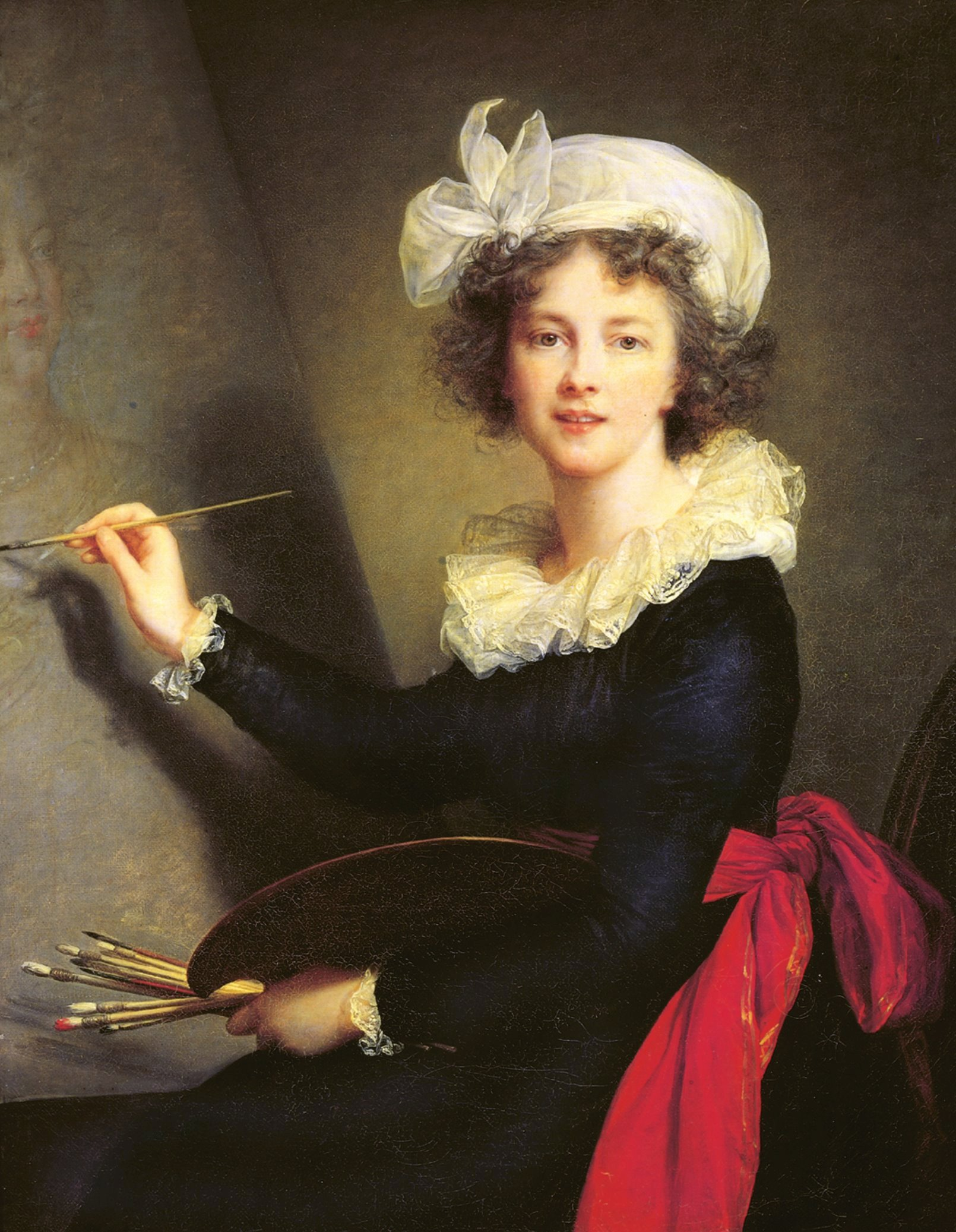
- Artist: Elisabeth Vigée Le Brun
- Year: 1790
- Medium: Oil on canvas
- Dimensions: 100 cm × 81 cm (39 in × 32 in)
- Location: Uffizi, Florence

Self-Portrait Painting Marie Antoinette is an oil-on-canvas painting by Élisabeth Vigée Le Brun from 1790. It is held in the collection of the Uffizi in Florence. The painting shows Le Brun in a black silk robe with a red sash, pausing mid-brushstroke before an outlined image. Le Brun painted the work in Rome after fleeing France to escape the French Revolution in 1789. She conceived the work as a demonstration of her support for the French Queen. She intended to give the work to the Grand Duke of Tuscany for the gallery that he maintained of artists' self-portraits.

== Commission ==
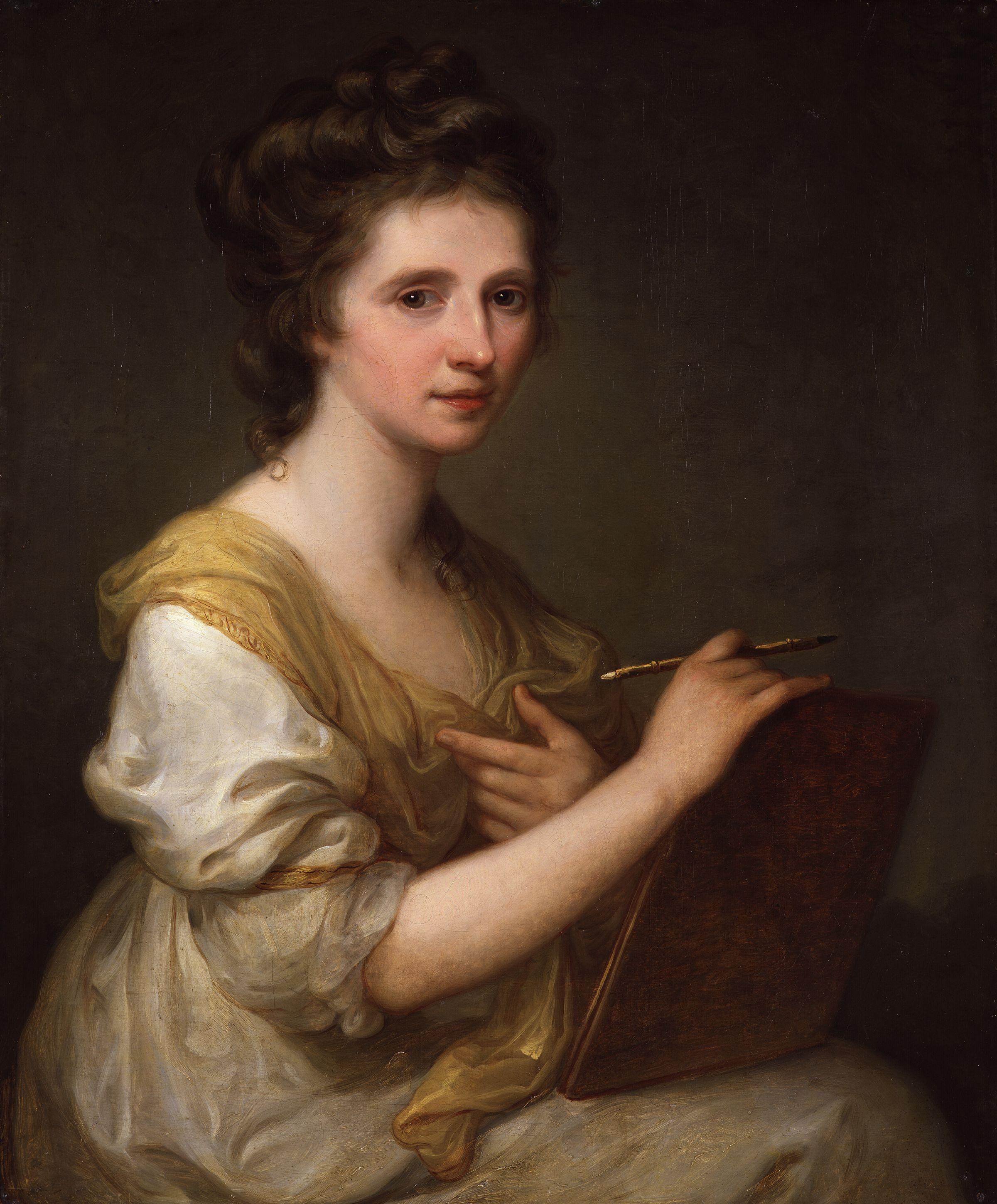
Self-portrait by Angelica Kauffman, 1770–75

After fleeing Paris, Le Brun arrived in Italy in November 1789. She visited the Galleria degli Uffizi and was captivated by the collection of self-portraits set up by Prince Leopoldo de’ Medici. In particular, she was inspired by a self-portrait by Angelica Kauffman, whose talent she greatly admired. Le Brun also related to Kauffman as they were both successful young prodigies and married libertines who financially ruined them.

The Uffizi authorities invited Le Brun to add her own self-portrait to the collection. The honor and the sense of inferiority she experienced as a result of this invite is evident through her admission of her "limited erudition" in comparison to the current incumbents of the portrait collection. She began her work in December 1789 in an apartment at the Palazzo Mancini in Rome, which was the headquarters of the Académie de France. She said, “Immediately after my arrival in Rome, I did my portrait for the Florence gallery. I painted myself with a palette in hand, in front of a canvas on which I am drawing the queen in white chalk.” The work took two and a half months to complete.

In April 1790, Le Brun went to Naples most likely bringing her self-portrait with her. In 1791, Lord Bristol asked her to create a replica of the self-portrait but depicting Julie, Le Brun’s daughter, instead of Marie Antoinette.

After arriving back in Rome, she sent her self-portrait to the Uffizi, in Florence. The painting was greeted with enthusiasm, and Le Brun received acclaim from the Academy of San Luca in Rome. In April 1792, Le Brun decided to visit her work in the Uffizi but was disappointed by how high the painting was hanging and how close it was to the surrounding works.

== Description ==
=== Content ===
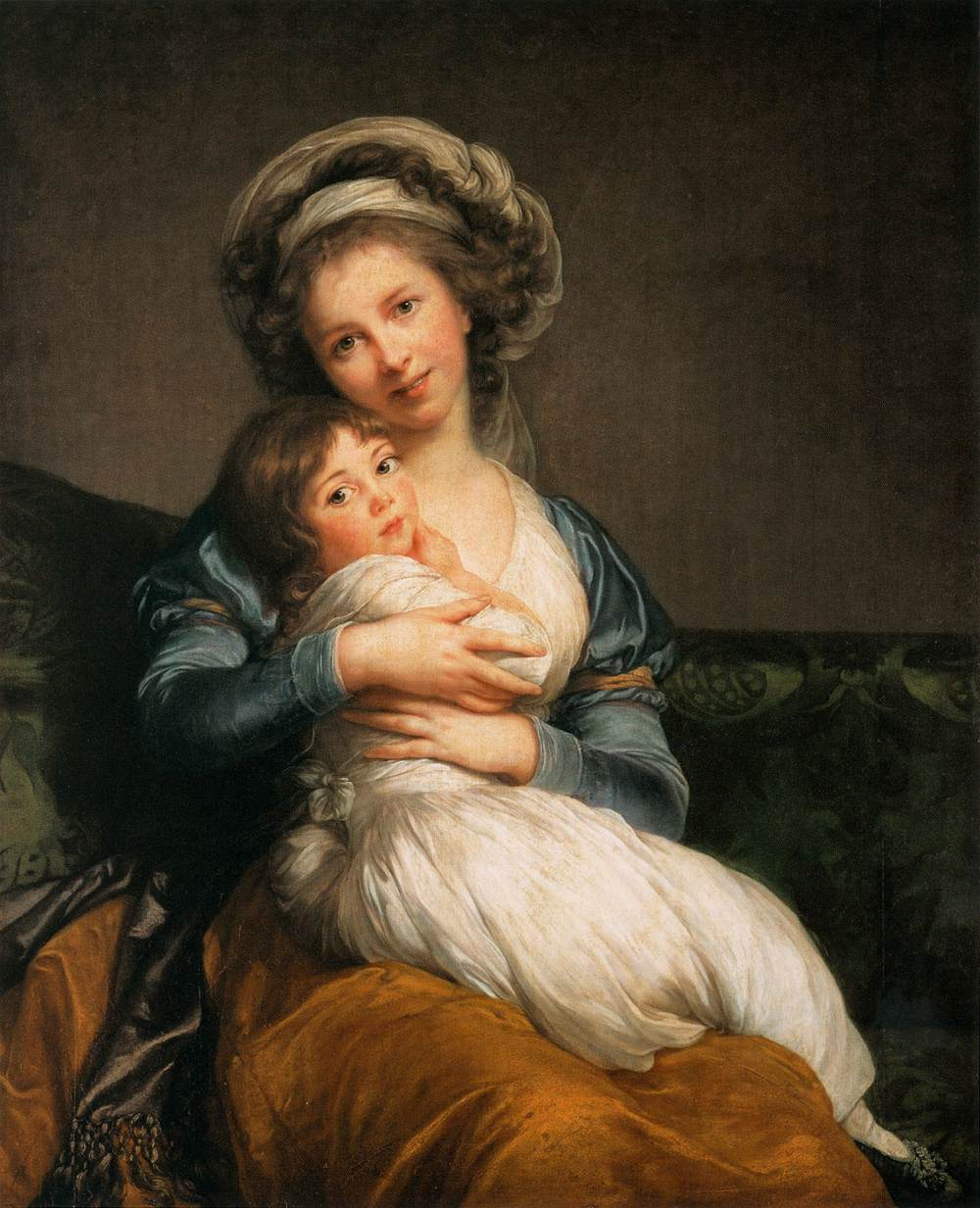
Self-Portrait with Her Daughter, Julie, Elisabeth Vigée Le Brun, 1786

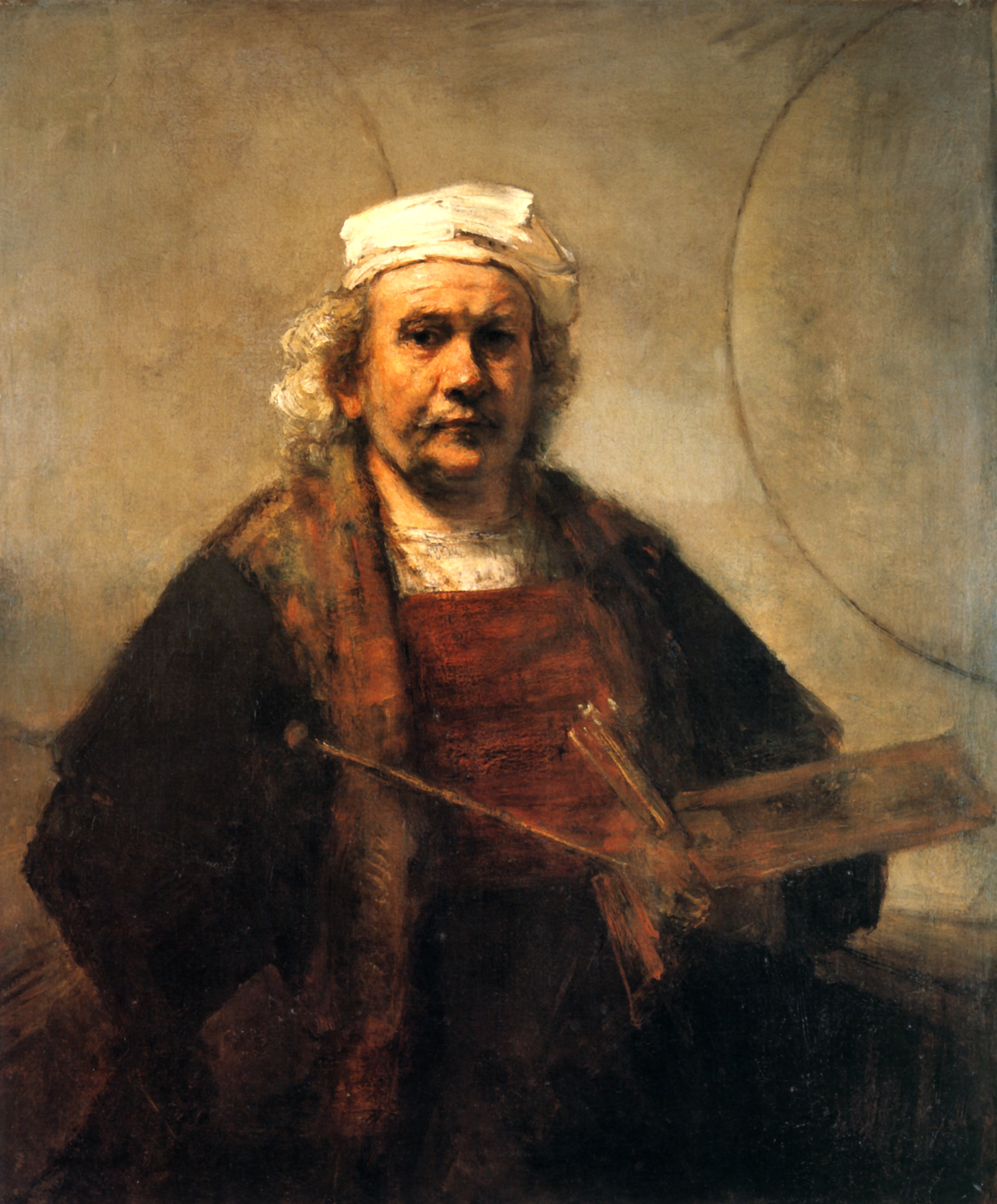
Self Portrait with Two Circles, Rembrandt, 1665-69

Vigée Le Brun presents herself with the same warm, engaging smile that distinguished her earlier self-portraits (such as her Self-Portrait with Julie, Maternal Tenderness). She looks at the viewer and is dressed in an elegant black silk robe. This reflects her elevated status, which is further accentuated by a vivid red sash at her waist. Atop her brown curls sits a white turban-like cloth, evoking the headdresses frequently seen in Rembrandt’s self-portraits.

The simple black dress contrasts her lace collar to emphasize the graceful curve of her neck. She pictures herself in front of her easel holding a canvas with a white chalk outline of Marie Antoinette, for whom she was formerly the official portraitist. In her left hand, she clutches a bundle of brushes and a palette, while her right hand is depicted in the moment before she touches her brush to the canvas.

=== Style ===
Vigée Le Brun’s style in this work was inspired by Italian, specifically Bolognese, art from the early 18th century. She operated in the transitional time between the Rococo and Neoclassical periods, incorporating elements from both styles.

=== Materials and techniques ===
The painting was completed with oil paints on canvas. A badger brush was used to create a smooth gradation between light and shadow. Vigée Le Brun used heavier brushstrokes in the lace and linen details, depositing more material on the canvas to create more dimension. A limited palette of colors was used, highlighting the more saturated areas of the canvas.

== Interpretation ==
While the Self-Portrait Painting Marie Antoinette was commissioned after the turmoil of Vigée Le Brun‘s flight from her homeland, France, the faint smile on her lips reveals only serenity and grace. She describes her emotional state upon arriving in Rome in her memoires saying, "I could now paint no longer; my broken spirit, bruised with so many horrors, shut itself entirely to my art." The composure she chose to portray suggests neither her admitted fear nor despair but rather quiet defiance and self-assurance. Critics have noted that Vigée Le Brun's self-portraits often display a degree of self-importance, lacking the raw introspection found in Rembrandt’s work.

The faint chalk outlines of Marie Antoinette on the canvas are a reminder of Vigée Le Brun's position as the queen's official portraitist. Its presence affirms her continuing loyalty to her royal patroness, Marie Antoinette, in the face of the political turmoil of the French Revolution. By depicting herself in the act of painting the queen, she reaffirmed her royal affiliation.
