= Madame Élisabeth de France =

Painting by Adélaide Labille-Guiard

Madame Élisabeth de France (1764–1794)
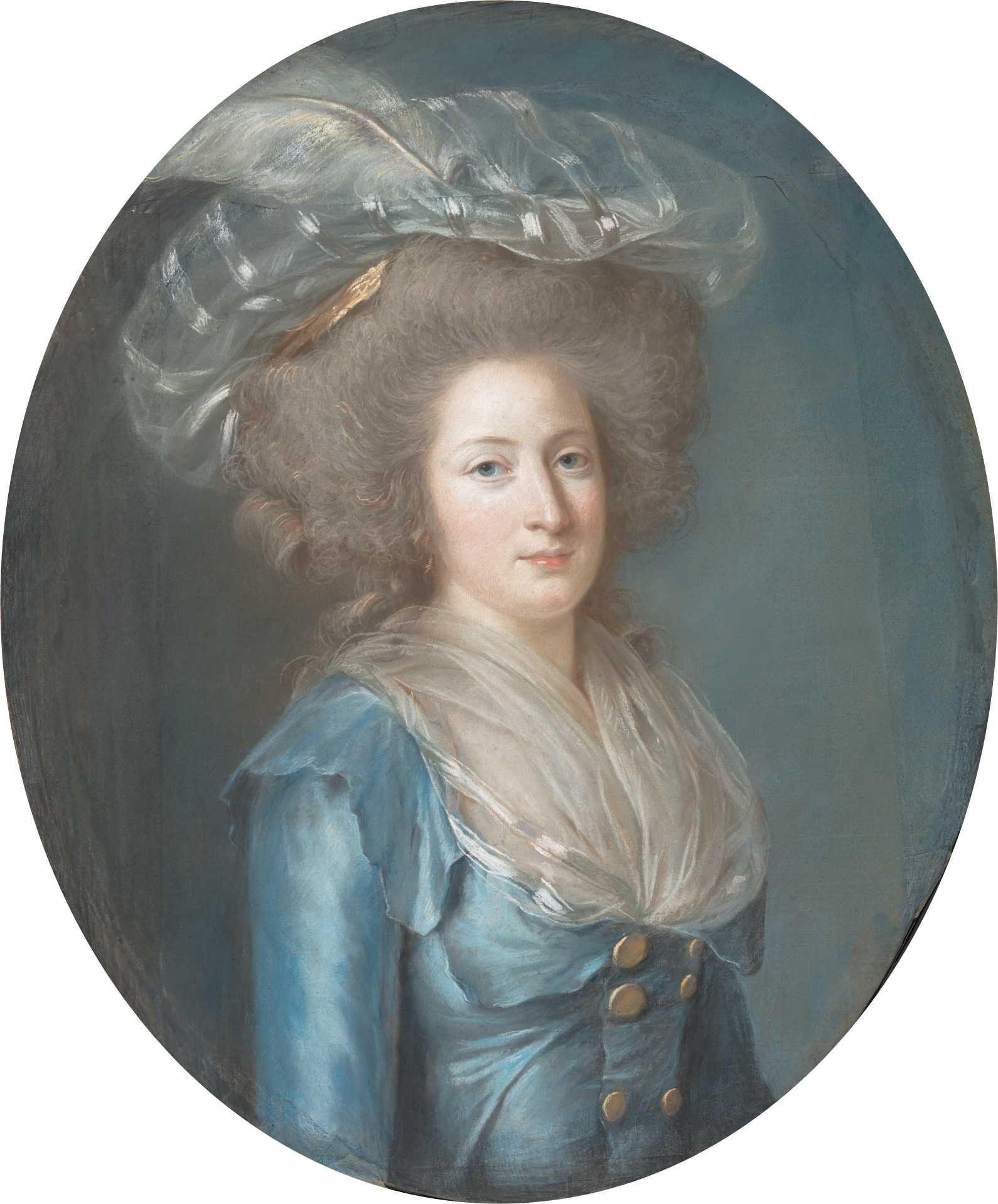
- Artist: Adélaïde Labille-Guiard
- Year: c. 1787
- Dimensions: 78.7 cm (31.0 in) × 65.4 cm (25.7 in)
- Location: Metropolitan Museum of Art
- Accession No.: 2007.441
- Identifiers: The Met object ID: 439405

Madame Élisabeth de France is a painting by Adélaïde Labille-Guiard, from c. 1787. It is in the collection of the Metropolitan Museum of Art, in New York.

== Description and interpretation ==
The work depicts Élisabeth of France, sister to Louis XVI, who lived in Montreuil. The painting was presented at the Salon of 1787 at the Paris Salon of Painting and Sculpture.
