= Marie Antoinette and Her Children =

Painting by Élisabeth Vigée Le Brun

- Artist: Élisabeth Vigée Le Brun
- Year: 1787
- Medium: Oil on canvas
- Dimensions: 275 cm × 216.5 cm (108 in × 85.2 in)
- Location: Palace of Versailles, Versailles

Marie Antoinette and Her Children, also known as Marie Antoinette of Lorraine-Habsburg, Queen of France, and Her Children (Note: French: Marie-Antoinette de Lorraine-Habsbourg, reine de France, et ses enfants) is an oil painting by the French artist Élisabeth Vigée Le Brun, painted in 1787, and currently displayed at the Palace of Versailles. Its dimensions are 275 by 216.5 cm (108.3 by 85.2 in).

== History ==
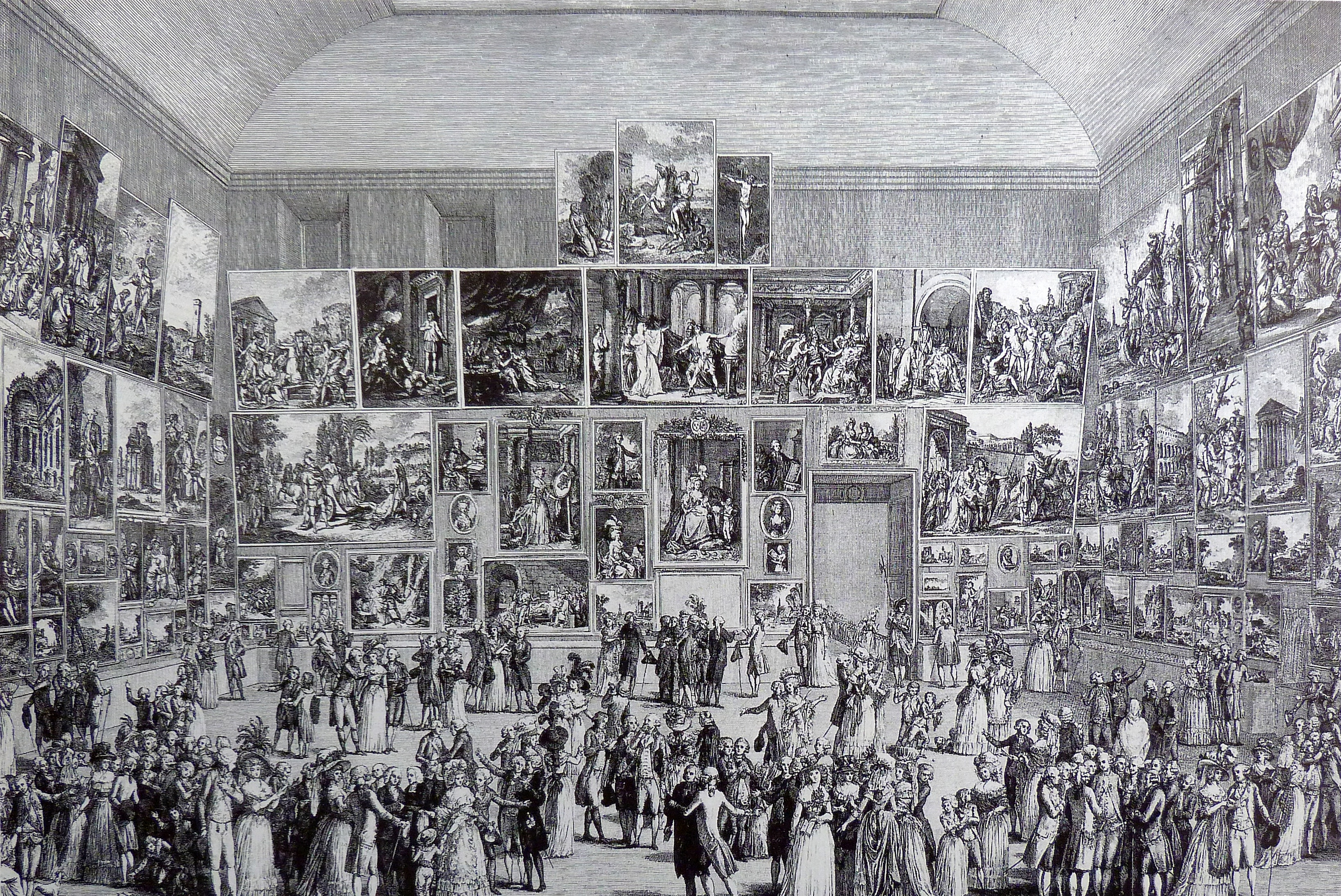
Exhibition at the Salon of 1787 by Pietro Antonio Martini

In July 1785, Marie Antoinette's reputation was tarnished by the Affair of the Diamond Necklace. Despite her lack of personal involvement in the affair, public opinion turned against her. In an effort to improve public perception of the queen, later that year, Élisabeth Vigée Le Brun was commissioned by Louis XVI to paint an official portrait depicting Marie Antoinette sympathetically. The focus was to be on Marie Antoinette as a queen and, more importantly, a mother; as such, the painting shows her surrounded by her children and wearing little jewellery. To further engage the public's sympathy, Vigée Le Brun left an empty cradle in the place of the queen's youngest child, Sophie-Hélène-Béatrix, who died shortly before the painting was completed.

Its first public showing was intended to be at the Salon of August 1787. However, due to Marie Antoinette's unpopularity at the time and fears that the painting would be damaged, Vigée Le Brun refused to send it. Nevertheless, the administration insisted that she do so, and the painting was exhibited, with the reaction being mixed.

After the Salon, until June 1789, it was exhibited in the Mars Room in the Palace of Versailles. During the French Revolution, it was stored in the national collections; since the reign of Louis Philippe I, it has been in the care of the museum of Versailles.

== Description ==
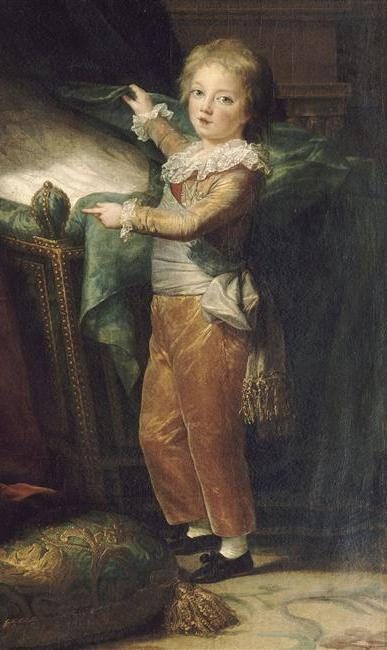
Louis Joseph, Dauphin of France

The painting shows Marie Antoinette wearing a red velvet gown with sable lining. Her younger son, the future Louis XVII, is sitting on her lap and her daughter, Marie-Thérèse, is leaning on her arm. Her elder son, Louis-Joseph, the Dauphin at the time, is near the empty cradle, intended for her younger daughter, Sophie-Béatrice, who died before the painting's completion.

The painting is heavy with symbolism. Its overall composition is inspired by Renaissance depictions of the Holy Family, as advised by Jacques-Louis David, a notable contemporary painter. There are additional references more personal to Marie Antoinette, such as the Hall of Mirrors of Versailles behind her, or the dress she is wearing, which is reminiscent of one Marie Leszczyńska wore in a portrait. There is also a jewellery cabinet on the right, which evokes the story of Cornelia, an ancient Roman who famously said her children were her jewels. This last reference serves to emphasize Marie Antoinette's image as a mother, placing her own children above material concerns like jewels, especially in the wake of the Diamond Necklace scandal.

== Legacy ==
The painting is one of the most emblematic works in the Versailles collection and is considered an important national treasure; it is known to most in France as it is reproduced in history textbooks.

Three Gobelin tapestry versions were produced in 1814, 1822 and 1897. The first was given to Empress Elizabeth of Austria in 1868 and the third to Empress Alexandra Feodorovna of Russia. The second tapestry has been at the Élysée Palace since 1877.
