= Self-Portrait with Julie (Maternal Tenderness) =

1787 by Elisabeth Louise Vigée Le Brun

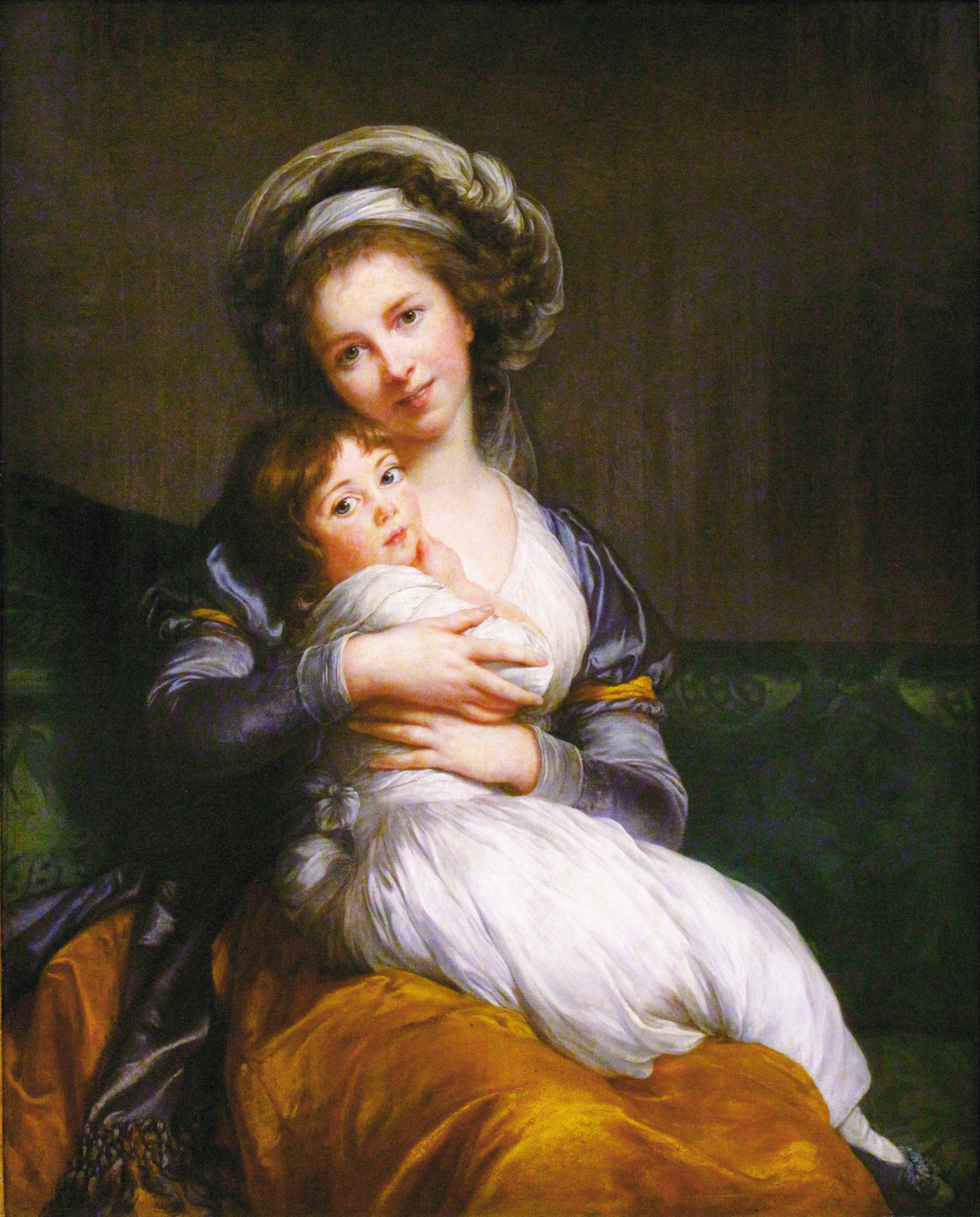
- Artist: Élisabeth Vigée Le Brun
- Year: 1787
- Medium: oil on wood
- Dimensions: 105 cm × 84 cm (41 in × 33 in)
- Location: Louvre, Paris

Self-Portrait with Julie (Maternal Tenderness) is a 1787 painting by Élisabeth Vigée Le Brun showing the artist with her daughter. It is now in the collection of the Louvre.

== Description ==
The painting depicts Le Brun with her daughter Julie in her lap, both turned toward the viewer. The figures are positioned in the immediate foreground. The artist grips her daughter tightly in her hands, which are prominently visible, placing an emphasis on the act of embrace.

Le Brun is smiling with her teeth visible. According to the historian Colin Jones, the display of teeth when smiling was unusual in elite portraiture until this point in history. Improvements in dentistry, Jones suggests, allowed for good teeth to become markers of status.
