= Gustave de Reiset =

French diplomat, writer and art collector (1821–1905)

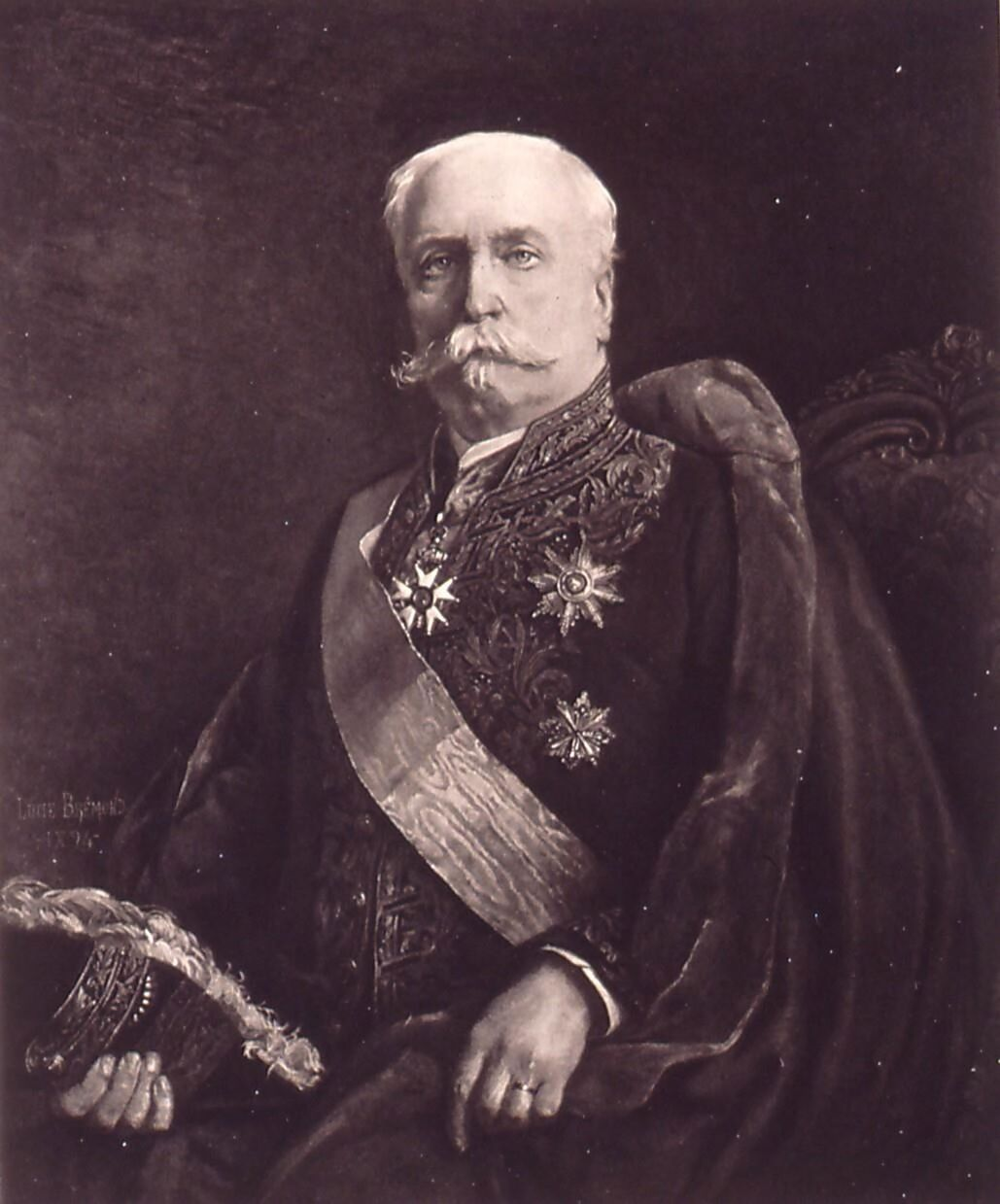
de Reiset in 1894

Gustave-Armand-Henri, comte de Reiset (13 July 1821 – 2 March 1905) was a French diplomat, writer and art collector.

== Life ==
Born at Mont-Saint-Aignan, he was the brother of his fellow collector Frédéric and the politician Jules as well as the nephew of the Napoleonic general Marie Antoine. He entered the diplomatic service in 1840 as attaché then ambassador's secretary in Rome then Frankfurt. He was also conseiller général for the canton of Saint-André-de-l'Eure (1858–1871).

Pope Gregory XVI made him a hereditary Roman count on 21 May 1842 and the title was recognised in France by an ordinance of Louis-Philippe of France dated 6 August the same year, followed by letters patent on 14 November that year. He became chief secretary and chargé d'affaires in Turin on 16 May 1848 and on 20 May 1856 married Marie Ernestine Blanche Le Fébure de Sancy de Parabère, daughter of baron de Sancy de Parabère and granddaughter of general Charles Lefebvre-Desnouettes. 1856 also saw him become minister plenipotentiary to Darmstadt.

He was given an important mission in Italy in 1859 and was sent as ambassador to the Kingdom of Hanover in 1863. He died at his home of Le Breuil-Benoît Abbey, which he had begun to restore in 1842 and where he had built a new church, consecrated in 1854. He was a keen collector and acquired a fireplace from the château de Roujou à Fresnes (Loir-et-Cher) bearing a gilded bronze bas relief showing a bust of Francis I of France in profile - the bust was attributed to Matteo del Nassaro.

== Selected works ==
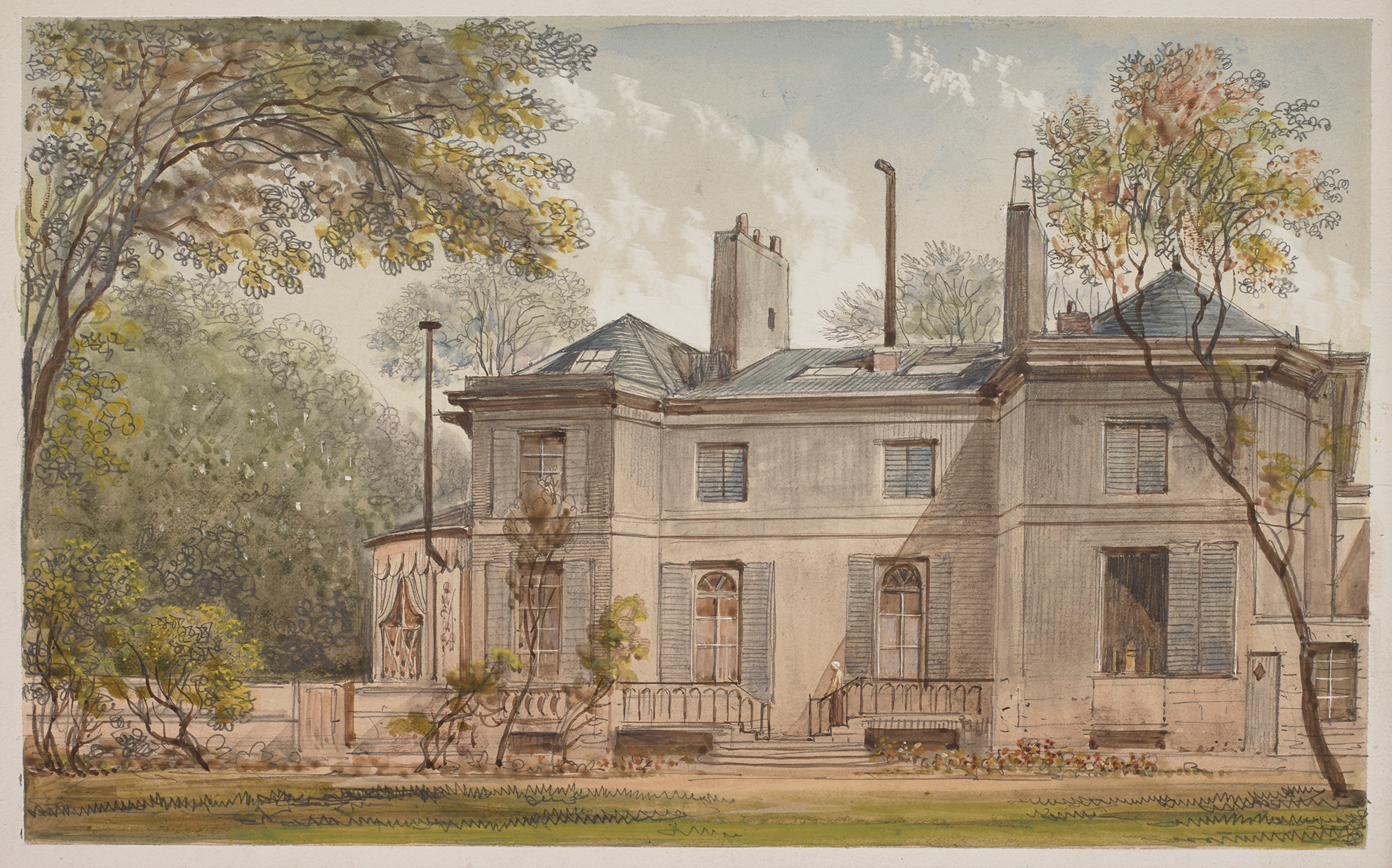
Hôtel Bonaparte, watercolour by Gustave de Reiset from 1856. The historic house belonged to his wife's family.

- 1866 : Notice généalogique sur la famille de Reiset originaire de Lorraine : établie en Bourgogne au commencement du XVe et, en 1470, dans le Comtè de Ferrette en Alsace
- 1876 : Le château de Crécy et madame de Pompadour
- 1885 : Modes et usages au temps de Marie-Antoinette (won the Prix Bordin of the Académie française)
- 1885 : Armorial général ou Registres de la Noblesse de France. (Supplément.) Notice généalogique sur la famille de Reiset
- 1895 : Généalogie de la famille de Reiset
- 1901-1903 : Mes souvenirs 3, L'Unité de l'Italie et l'unité de l'Allemagne (preface by Robinet de Cléry)
- 1904 : Mes souvenirs 2, La Guerre de Crimée et la cour de Napoléon III (preface by Robinet de Cléry)
- 1903 : Mes souvenirs 1, Les Débuts de l'indépendance italienne (preface by Robinet de Cléry)

== Honours ==
- Légion d'honneur – Commandeur
- Order of Philip the Magnanimous of Hesse – Grand Cross
- Order of Adolphe of Nassau – Grand Cross
- Royal Guelphic Order of Hanover – Grand Cross
- Hessian Order of Merit – Gold Medal
- Order of Saints Maurice and Lazare of Sardinia – Commander
- Sacred Military Constantinian Order of Saint George – Knight, First Class
- Order of Charles III of Spain – Knight

== Sources ==
- http://www.academie-francaise.fr/node/16686
