= Frédéric Reiset =

French art collector, art historian and curator

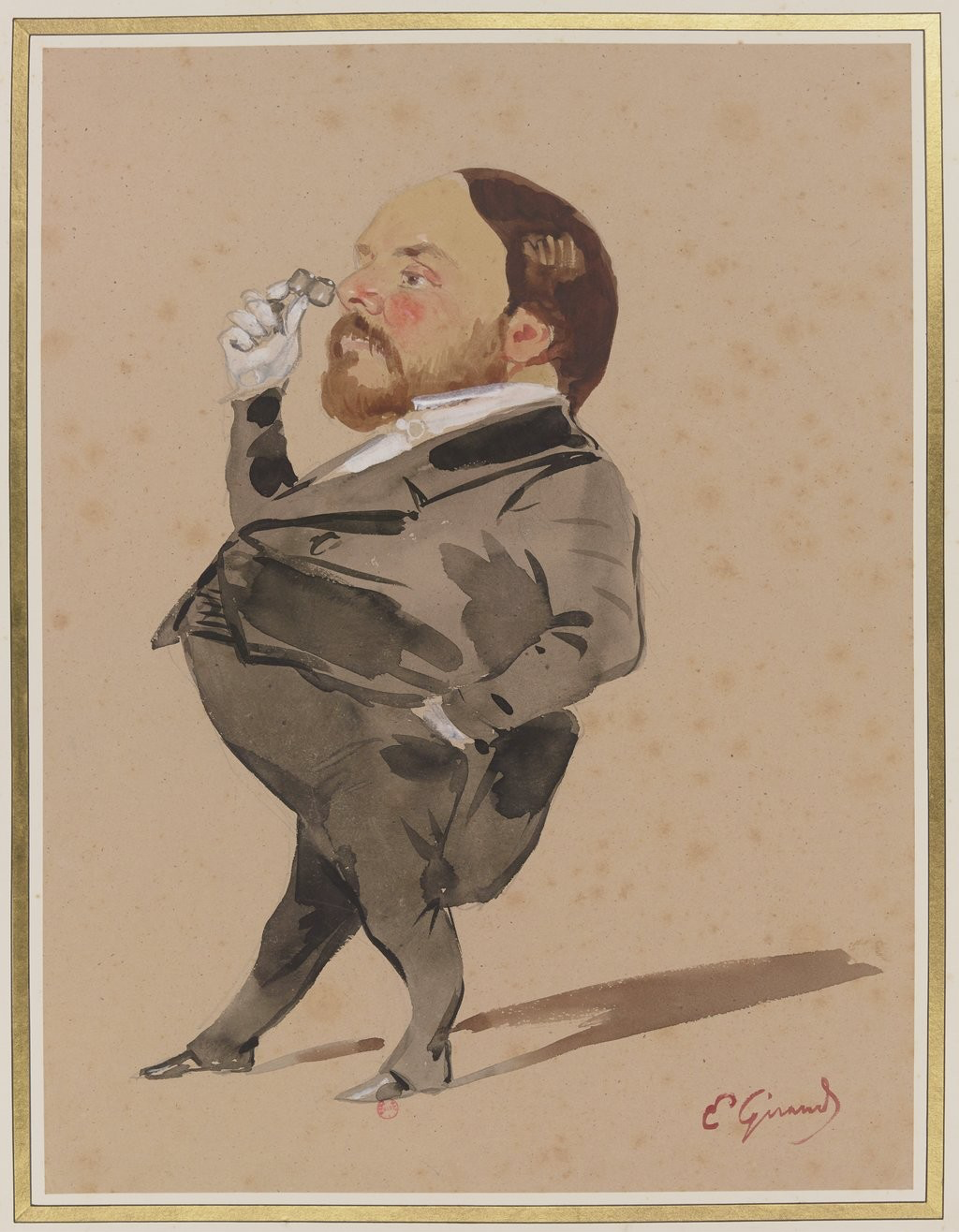
- Reiset by Pierre François Eugène Giraud
- Born: 12 June 1815; Oissel, France
- Died: 27 February 1891 (aged 75); Paris, France
- Occupations: art collector, art historian, curator

Marie Frédéric Eugène de Reiset (12 June 1815 – 27 February 1891) was a French art collector, art historian and curator. He served as curator of the department of prints and drawings at the Louvre and as director-general of France's Musées Nationaux.

== Life ==
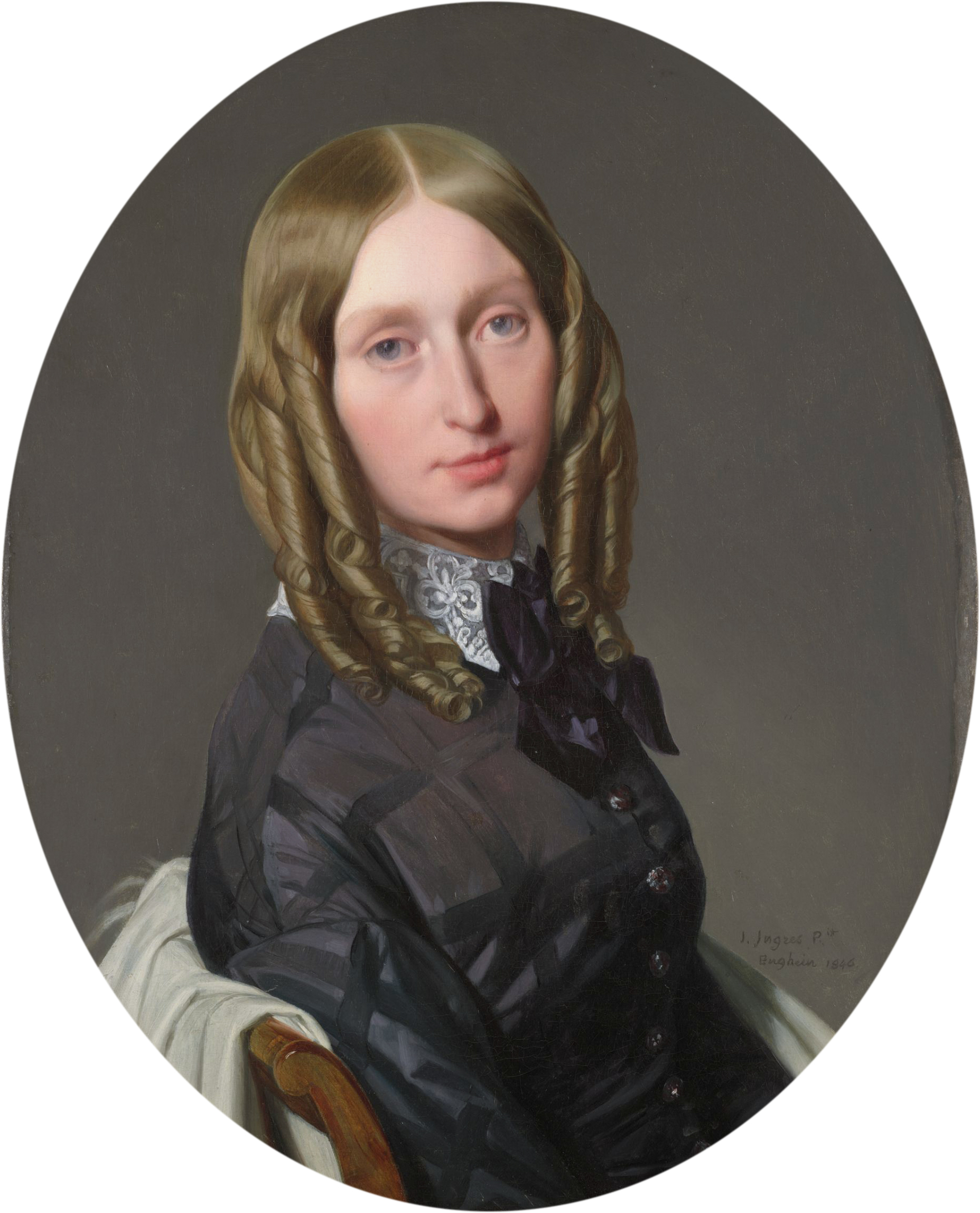
Portrait of his wife by Ingres.

Born in Oissel, he was the son of the receiver general for Seine-Maritime Jacques de Reiset (1771–1835), nephew of general Marie Antoine de Reiset and brother of Jules Reiset and Gustave de Reiset. His father was also a regent for the Banque de France from 1826 and on his death on 5 February 1835 Frédéric inherited his fortune. On 4 November the same year, he married his cousin Augustine Modeste Hortense de Reiset, with whom he had one daughter, who married count Edgar de Ségur-Lamoignon. The new couple moved into his family's hôtel particulier in Paris before honeymooning in Italy in 1836. There they visited the main artistic centres and became friends with Jean-Auguste-Dominique Ingres (then director of the Villa Medici in Rome). De Reiset began collecting on the trip, which confirmed his passion for art, particularly that of Raphael and the Umbrian school.

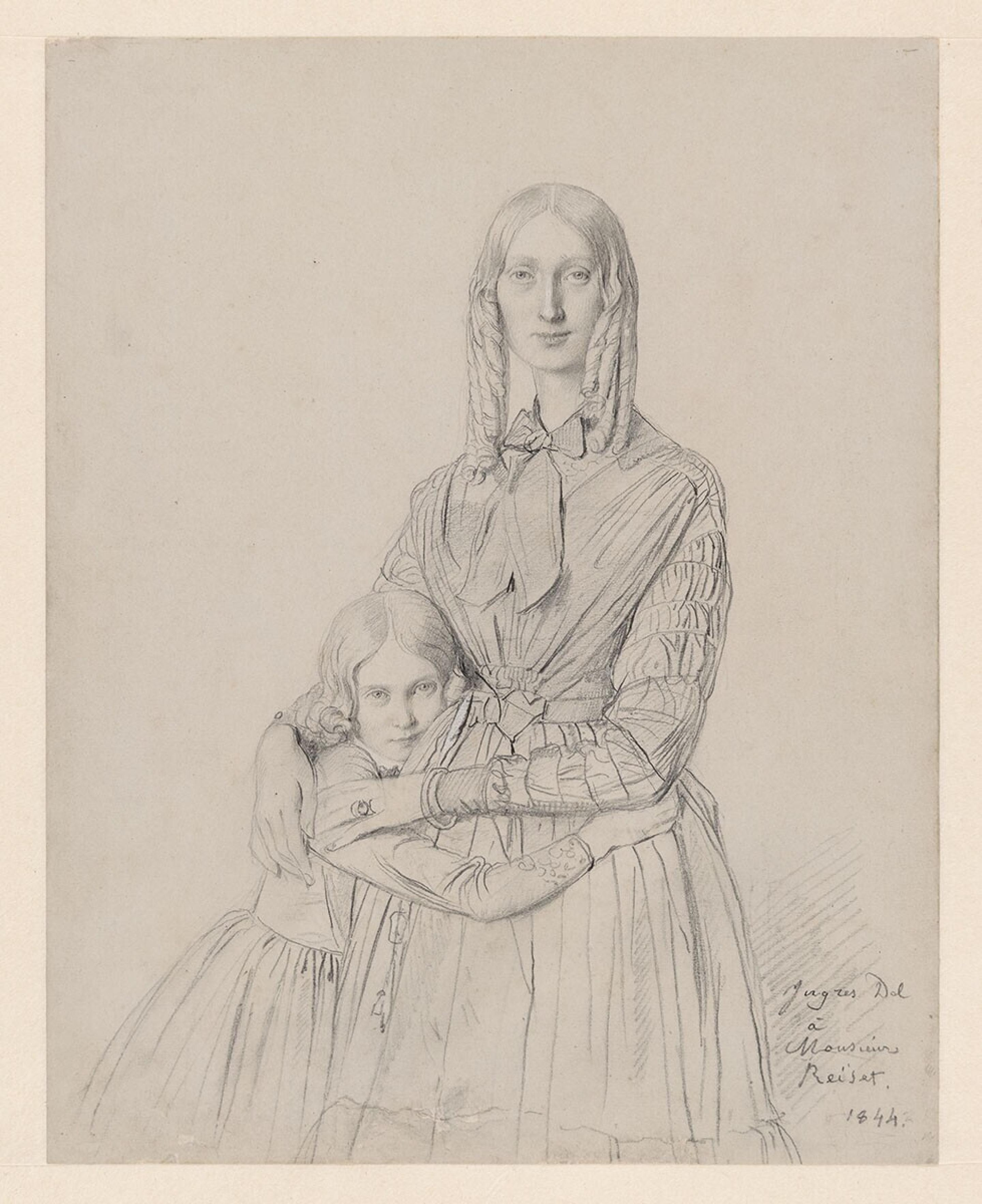
Reiset's wife and daughter in a drawing by Ingres.

He wrote on works in his own collection or in those he curated. In 1849 he stated that "throughout my life masterpieces have been, are and will be the object of my stubborn study every day", although he never wrote any general works on art history. He was made curator of the department of prints and drawings at the Louvre in January 1850, just when the Louvre was under the new leadership of the comte de Nieuwerkerke, lover of Napoleon III's cousin Mathilde Bonaparte. He and Horace His de la Salle had already visited the department in 1846, with Reiset himself stating "All the portfolios that we visited were just as monstrously classified". In the following decade he classified and catalogued the collection, added attributions, wrote an overall catalogue in 15 volumes, taking in 35,544 drawings. He specified that he had had to "attribute to each master all that legitimately belonged to him, to give him only what belonged to him, that was the problem to resolve ... I nevertheless had to go ahead at all costs, leaving behind many doubts, many opinions which we knew to be false, with any power to redress them, under penalty of losing everything and never completing the work". He also acquired several drawings for the museum, buying 23 Renaissance Italian drawings at the sale of William III of the Netherlands' collection on 12 August 1850, and negotiating the purchase of the Codex Vallardi in 1856, rettributing it from Leonardo da Vinci to Pisanello.

He was made a Chevalier de la Légion d'honneur on 21 January 1853, rising to Officier on 12 August 1864. He sold his collection of 381 drawings to the duc d'Aumale for 140000 francs in 1861 and edited a catalogue of them the same year, dedicated to his friend Horace His de la Salle. The work allowed him to explain his position as a collector and connoisseur devoted to studying the old masters – "The one who is called a connoisseur has been obliged, after much trial and error, to forge his own scientific armour piece by piece". After a controversy over restoration he was made curator of paintings, drawings and engravings at the Louvre in place of Frédéric Villot in 1861 – Villot was instead made secretary general of France's Musées impériaux (Imperial Museums).

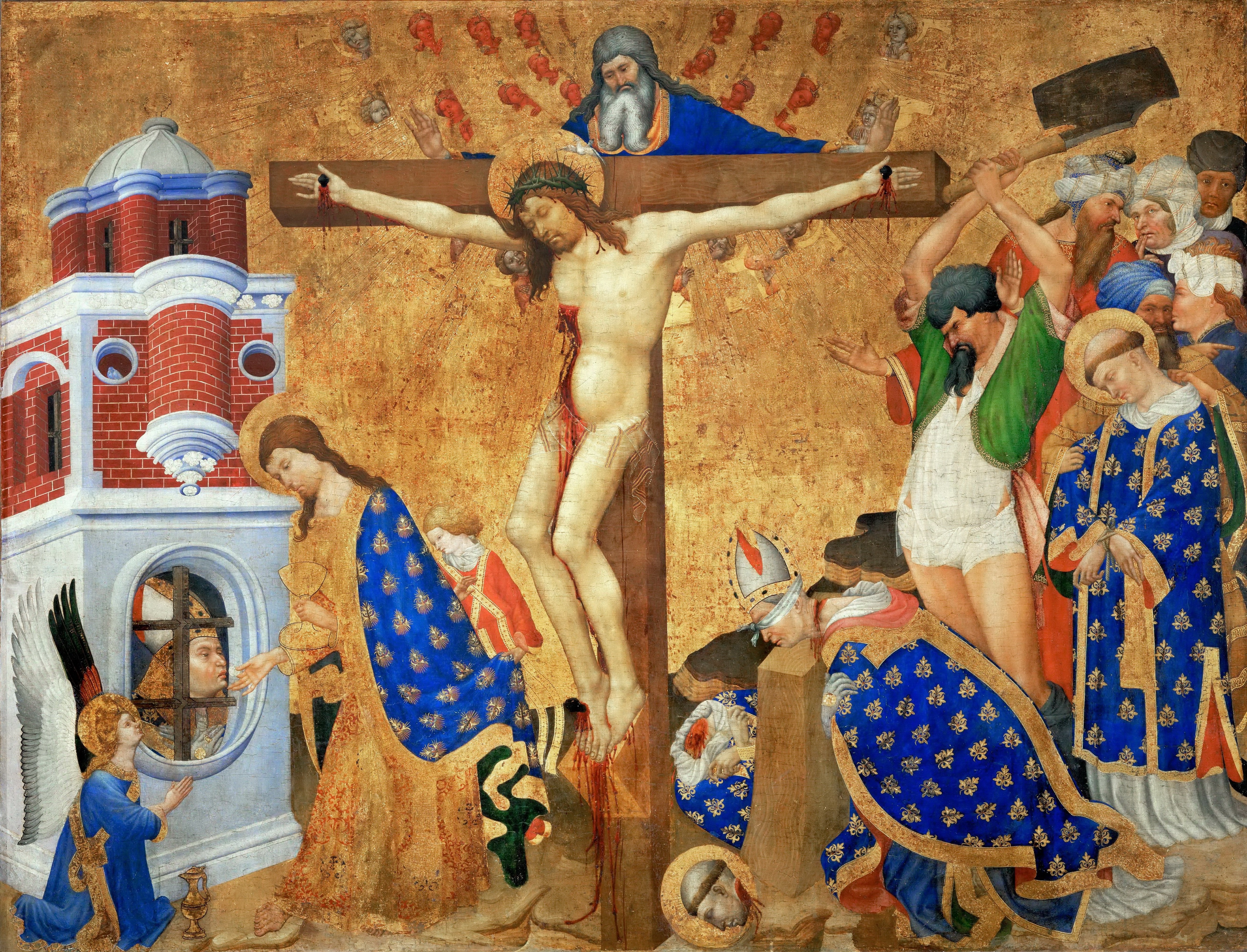
Henri Bellechose Saint Denis Altarpiece

In 1862 he became a member of the commission choosing works for the Louvre from the Campana collection – he chose only 97 paintings out of a total of 646 and Ingres, Delacroix and other artists complained. This led the Académie des Beaux-Arts to also acquire 206 paintings from the collection, meaning a total of 313 could be exhibited in the aile de la Colonnade at the Louvre. Reiset had a low opinion of 14th and 15th century Italian artists and tried to send 141 of their works from the Louvre to French provincial museums in 1872, adding 38 more in 1876. Some attributed this to personal revenge, though he did give the Louvre the 1416 Saint Denis Altarpiece by the French painter Henri Bellechose in 1863, originally in the chartreuse de Champmol. His friend Louis La Caze gave his collection of 583 paintings to the French nation in 1869 – Reiset selected 272 for the Louvre and sent the others to the museums in the provinces. He published a catalogue of the works retained for the Louvre in 1870.

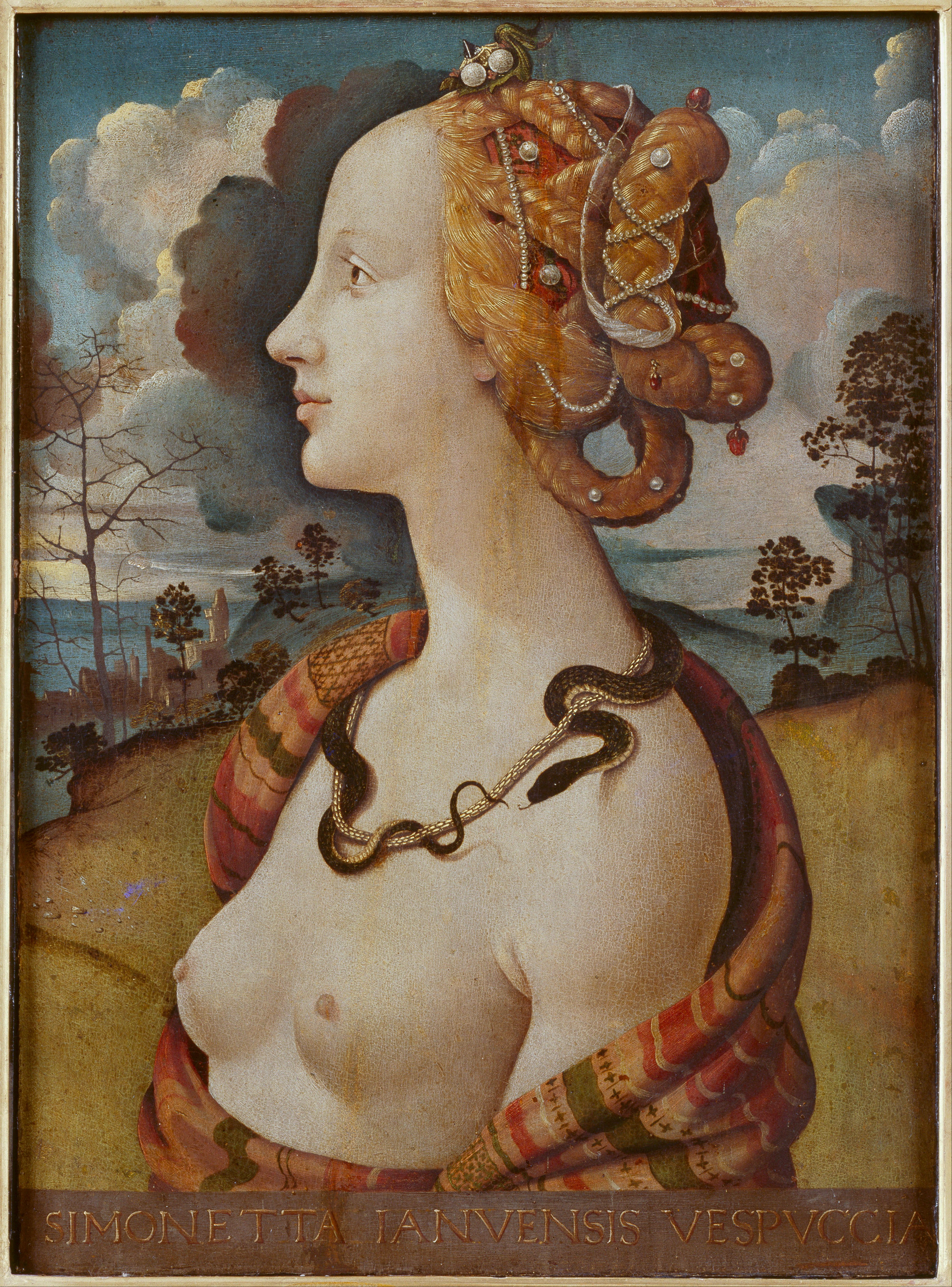
Piero di Cosimo Portrait of Simonetta Vespucci

He replaced Villot as secretary general of what were now the Musées Nationaux (National Museums) in 1874 and the following year joined the debate about the national museums' acquisition funds. He argued they were clearly inferior to those of British museums and complained that the Louvre was losing out at auction to the National Gallery, London and other British national collections. He proposed that the Caisse des Dépôts et Consignations assign an annual sum of 250,000 francs to France's national museums to acquire major works.

He sold 24 Italian paintings and 16 other paintings to the duc d'Aumale in April 1879 for 600,000 francs, an "acquisition which considerably enriched the galleries at Chantilly". These works included:

– Piero di Cosimo, Portrait known as Simonetta Vespucci by Piero di Cosimo;

– Avignon artist, Virgin of Mercy;

– Filipino Lippi, Esther and Ahasuerus;

– Gérard, Bonaparte ;

– Ingres, Self-portrait

– Ingres, Madame Devaucay

These works are now in the musée Condé in Chantilly. Reiset retired later that year and died in Paris twelve years later.

== Works ==
- Description abrégée des dessins de diverses écoles appartenant à M. Frédéric Reiset, imprimerie de A. Guyot et Scribe, Paris, 1850; p. 120 Gallica
- Notice des tableaux légués au Musée Impérial du Louvre par M. Louis La Caze, imprimeur Charles de Mourgues Frères, Paris, 1870 INHA
- Notices des tableaux du Musée Napoléon III exposés dans les salles de la colonnade au Louvre, imprimerie Charles de Mourgues Frères, Paris, 1868 INHA
- Notice des dessins, cartons, pastels, miniatures et émaux exposés dans les salles du 1er et du 2e étage au Musée impérial du Louvre. Deuxième partie : école française, dessins indiens, émaux, imprimerie Charles de Mourgues frères, Paris, 1869 Texte
- Notice des dessins, cartons, pastels, miniatures et émaux. Première partie, Écoles d'Italie, écoles allemande, flamande et hollandaise, précédée d'une introduction historique et du résumé de l'inventaire général des dessins : exposés dans les salles du 1er et du 2e étage au Musée national du Louvre, imprimerie Charles de Mourgues frères, Paris, 1878 Gallica
- Niccolo Dell'Abbate. Étude, Imprimerie de J. Claye, Paris, 1859 Texte
