= Jules Reiset =

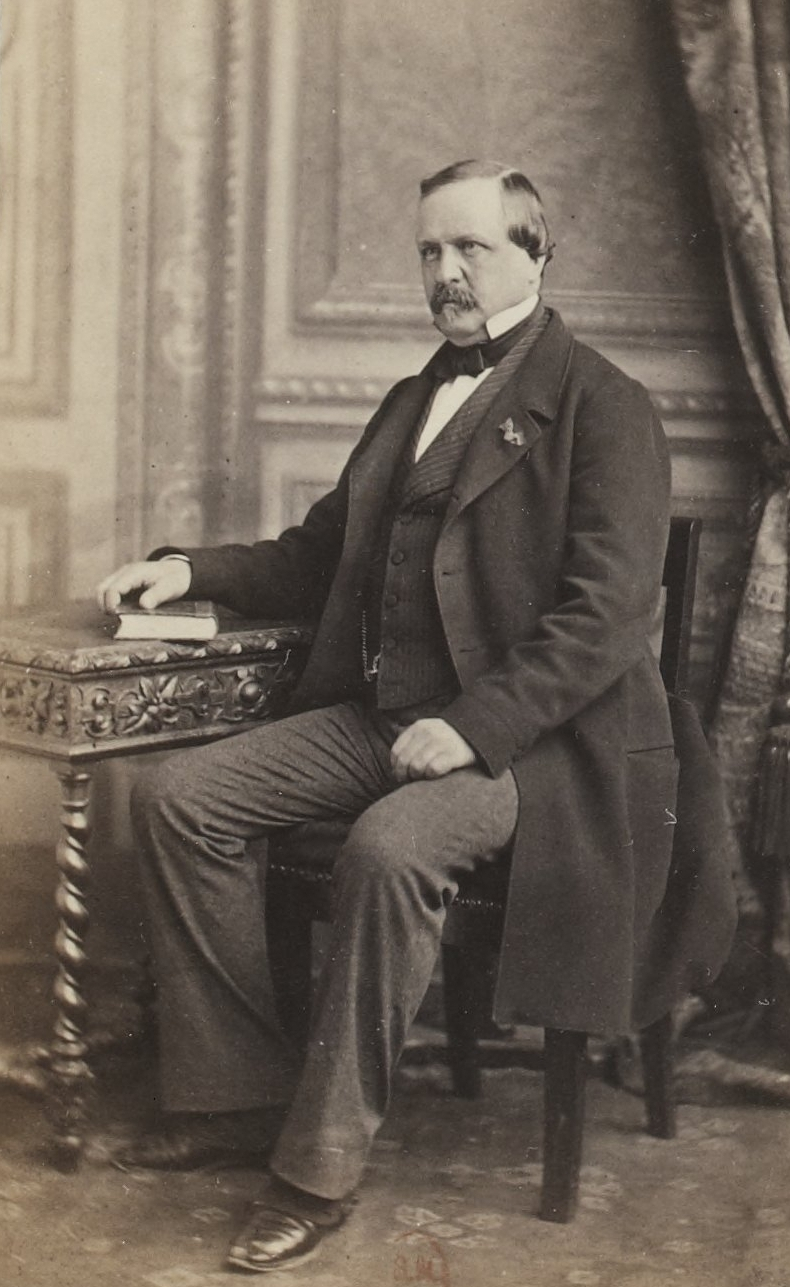
Reiset in the 1850s

Jules de Reiset (6 October 1818 - 5 February 1896) was a French agricultural chemist, politician and member of the Académie des Sciences. He was the husband of Juliette, daughter of Charles Lebègue de Germiny, finance minister and governor of the Banque de France.

== Life ==
Born in Rouen to Jacques de Reiset (brother of general Marie-Antoine de Reiset), his brothers were the art collectors Frédéric and Gustave.

He was serving as mayor of Anneville-sur-Scie and conseiller général for Seine-Inférieure when on 11 December 1859 he was elected deputy for Seine-Inférieure in the Corps législatif, by 15344 votes to 9266 for Buisson and 1668 for Bobée. He joined the 'dynastic majority' and voted with them until the 1863 election, when he retired from political life. He bought the château d'Arques-la-Bataille and thus saved it from complete destruction. He died in Paris.
