= Charles Lefebvre-Desnouettes =

French military officer

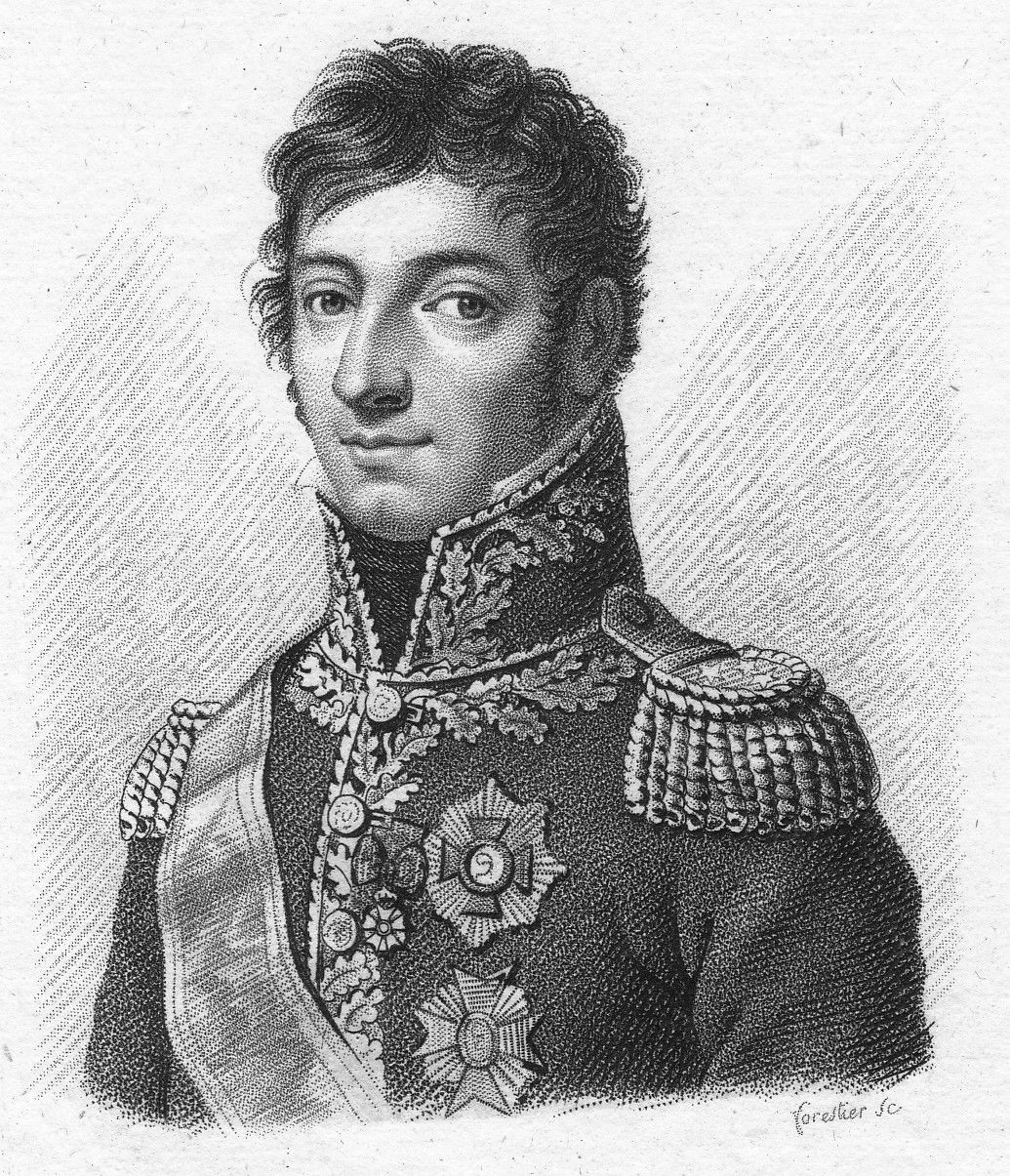
- Born: 14 September 1773; Paris, France
- Died: 22 April 1822 (aged 48) off the coast of Ireland
- Occupation: Soldier

Charles, comte Lefebvre-Desnouettes or Lefèbvre-Desnoëttes (French pronunciation: [ʃaʁl ləfevʁ denwɛt]; 14 September 1773, in Paris – 22 April 1822) became a French officer during the French Revolutionary Wars and a general during the Napoleonic Wars. He later emigrated to the United States.

== French Revolutionary Wars ==
He joined the army in 1792, and served with the armies of the North, of the Sambre et Meuse and Rhine et Moselle in the various campaigns of the French Revolution. Six years later he had become captain and aide-de-camp to General Napoleon Bonaparte. At the Battle of Marengo in June 1800 he won further promotion.

On 1 July 1806, in recognition of his services and in view of his upcoming wedding to Marie Louise Stéphanie Rolier (1787–1880), a first cousin of Napoléon Bonaparte, Napoléon gave him his house in Paris, the Hôtel Bonaparte, by a patent signed at the Château de Saint-Cloud.

== Empire ==
Under the Empire, Lefebvre-Desnouettes fought with distinction at the Battle of Elchingen in 1805. Later that year, he became colonel after the Battle of Austerlitz. He served also in the Prussian campaigns of 1806–1807. He was promoted to general of brigade in September 1806 and general of division in November 1807. He was created a count of the Empire in March 1808.

Sent with the army into Spain, he conducted the first and unsuccessful Siege of Saragossa. Later he commanded the IV Corps in several actions in Spain. On 29 December 1808, he was taken prisoner in the action of Benavente by the British cavalry under Henry Paget (later Lord Uxbridge, and subsequently Marquess of Anglesey).

For over two years Lefebvre-Desnouettes remained a prisoner in England, living, on parole from Norman Cross Prison, at Cheltenham with his wife Stephanie. In 1811 he broke his parole, an act which greatly offended British public opinion, and escaped; in the invasion of Russia in 1812, he led the Guard Chasseurs à cheval cavalry. In 1813 and 1814, he and his men distinguished themselves in most of the great battles, especially Brienne (where he was wounded), La Rothière, Montmirail, Vauchamps and Arcis-sur-Aube. He joined Napoleon in the Hundred Days and was appointed commander of the Guard Light Cavalry Division, which he commanded at the Battle of Quatre Bras. At the battle of Waterloo he was taken prisoner and placed under the guard of a single Dragoon, on his solemnly pledging his honour that he would not attempt to escape. When the Dragoon had taken him to the place where he was to be received, and had taken the saddle off his own horse, the General clapped spurs to his horse, and rode off, but the Dragoon, as quick as lightning, followed him on horseback, gave him a cut with his sabre on the forehead, and brought him back.

== Later career and death ==
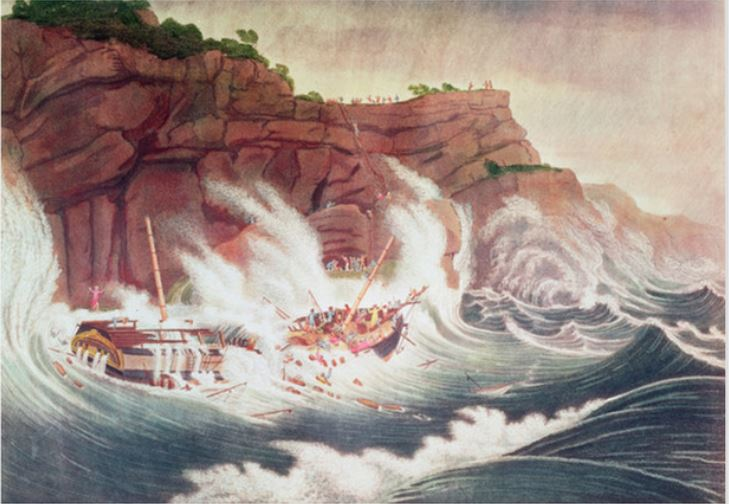
Sinking of the Albion.

For his part in the Hundred Days he was condemned to death by the royalists, but he escaped to the United States and spent the next few years farming in the Vine and Olive Colony, beginning in 1817. His frequent appeals to Louis XVIII eventually obtained his permission to return. However, the vessel on which he was returning to France, the American packet Albion of the Black Ball Line, went down off the south coast of Ireland on 22 April 1822.

Mr Everart, the only surviving passenger, reported that the general had been injured in the wreck and presumed drowned; the bodies washing up over a number of weeks were not identifiable. His body is one of those buried in Templetrine graveyard, Ballinspittle, near Kinsale in County Cork.

== Tributes ==
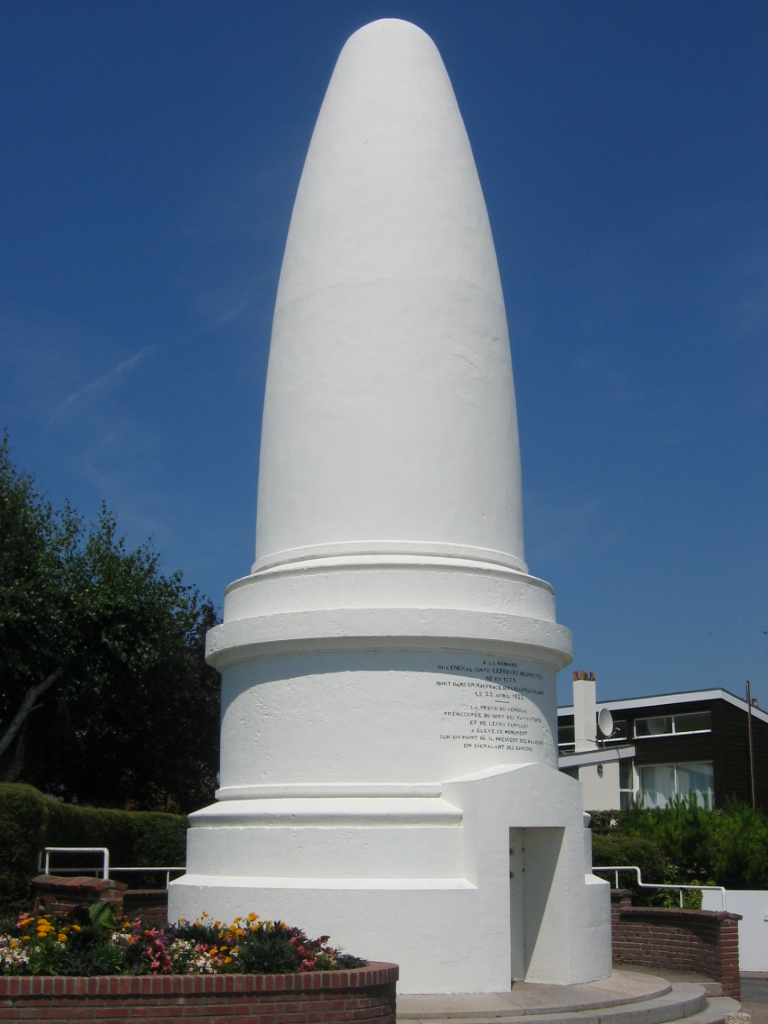
Monument for the victims who perished in the sinking.

He is recognized as LEFÈBVRE-DESNte on the 31st column of the Arc de Triomphe in Paris.

His widow had an obelisk, known as the "Pain de Sucre" (Sugarloaf) due to its shape and frequent re-painting in white, erected to his memory and that of the sailors who perished with him. It stands above the sea on the crest of a low hill in Sainte-Adresse, now a suburb of Le Havre, and doubled as a navigation mark helping other sailors avoid the hazards in the approach to the port.

== See also ==
- List of people who disappeared mysteriously at sea
