= Rue de la Victoire =

Street in Paris, France

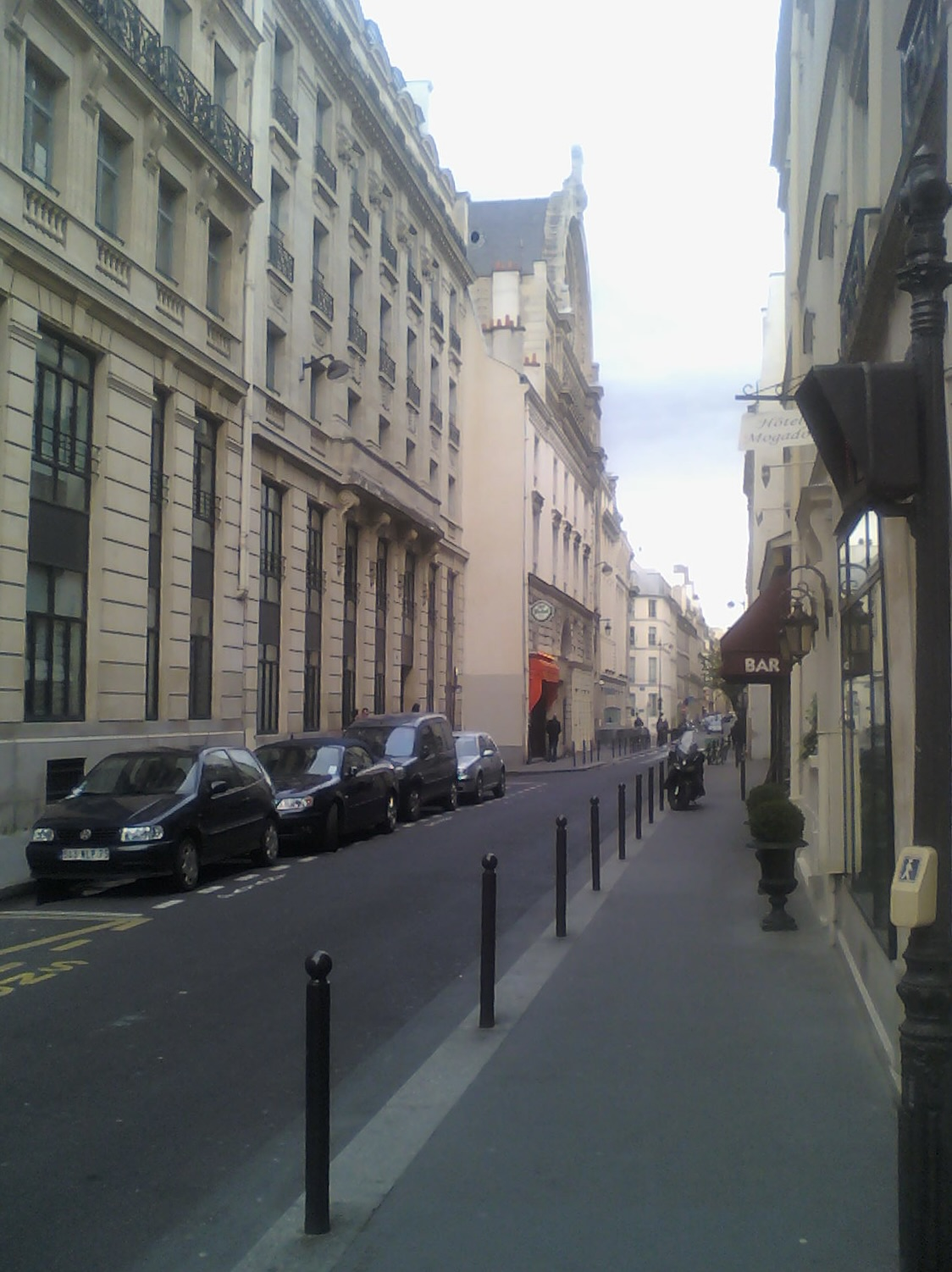

- Location within Paris
- Arrondissement: 9th
- Quarter: Chaussée d'Antin
- Coordinates: 48°52′30.65″N 2°20′6.76″E
- From: Rue La Fayette
- To: Rue Joubert

The Rue de la Victoire is a street in the 9th arrondissement of Paris.

Located near the Metro stations: Trinité - d'Estienne d'Orves, Le Peletier and Notre-Dame-de-Lorette.

== Origin of the name ==
The former name of the street was "Rue Chantereine", which means "singing frogs", after the many frogs in the area as the quarter was swampy. The street took the name "Rue de la Victoire" in 1797 after the success of Napoleon's campaign in Italy. In 1816, during the Bourbon Restoration, the street changed its name, but the name was restored in 1833.

== Notable places ==
- Grand Synagogue of Paris, at no. 44, completed in 1874, a monument historique.
- The former Hôtel Bonaparte, also known as the Maison du 18 Brumaire, from which Napoleon organised the coup of 18 Brumaire, was located at 6 Rue Chantereine.
- The Hotel Thellusson lay between the Rue de Provence and the Rue de la Victoire until its destruction in 1826.
- At the junction with the Rue Joubert there is a townhouse designed by the architect François-Joseph Bélanger. After his release from Saint Lazare Prison, he rebuilt the property in a neoclassical style.
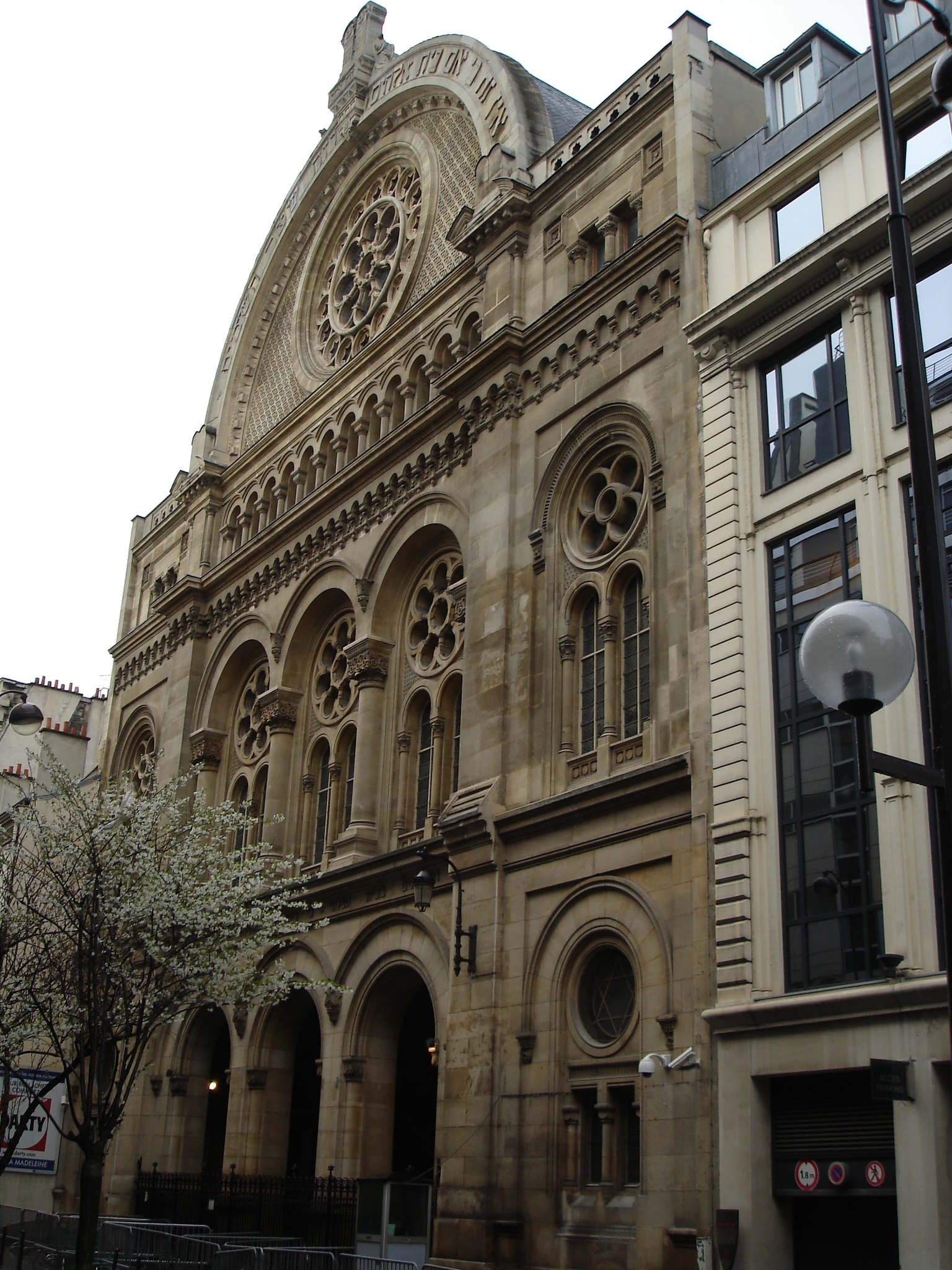
The Grand Synagogue of Paris

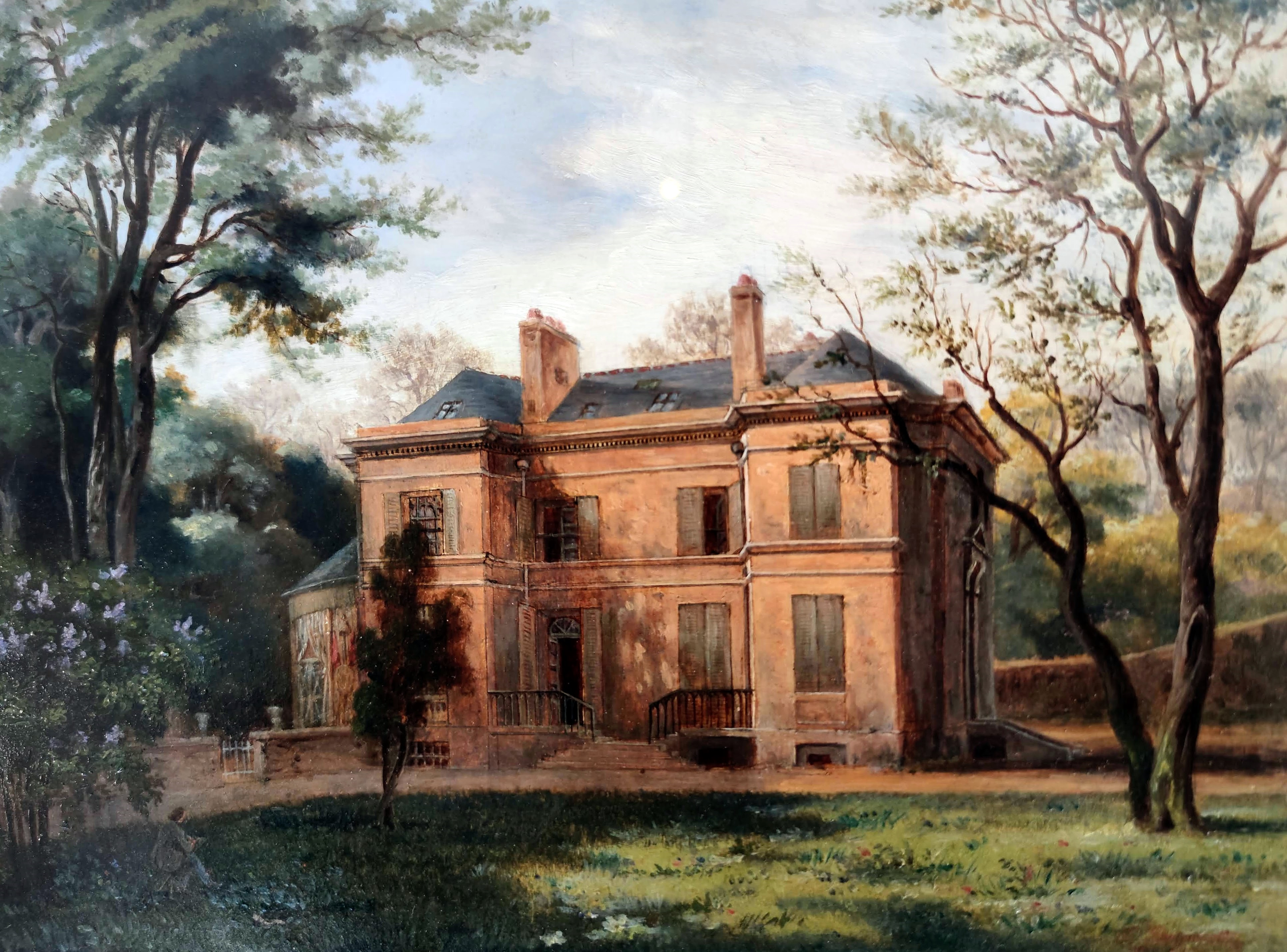
The Hôtel Bonaparte or Maison du 18 Brumaire
