= Hôtel Bonaparte =

Demolished townhouse in Paris, France

Coordinates: 48.87611°N 2.33410°E

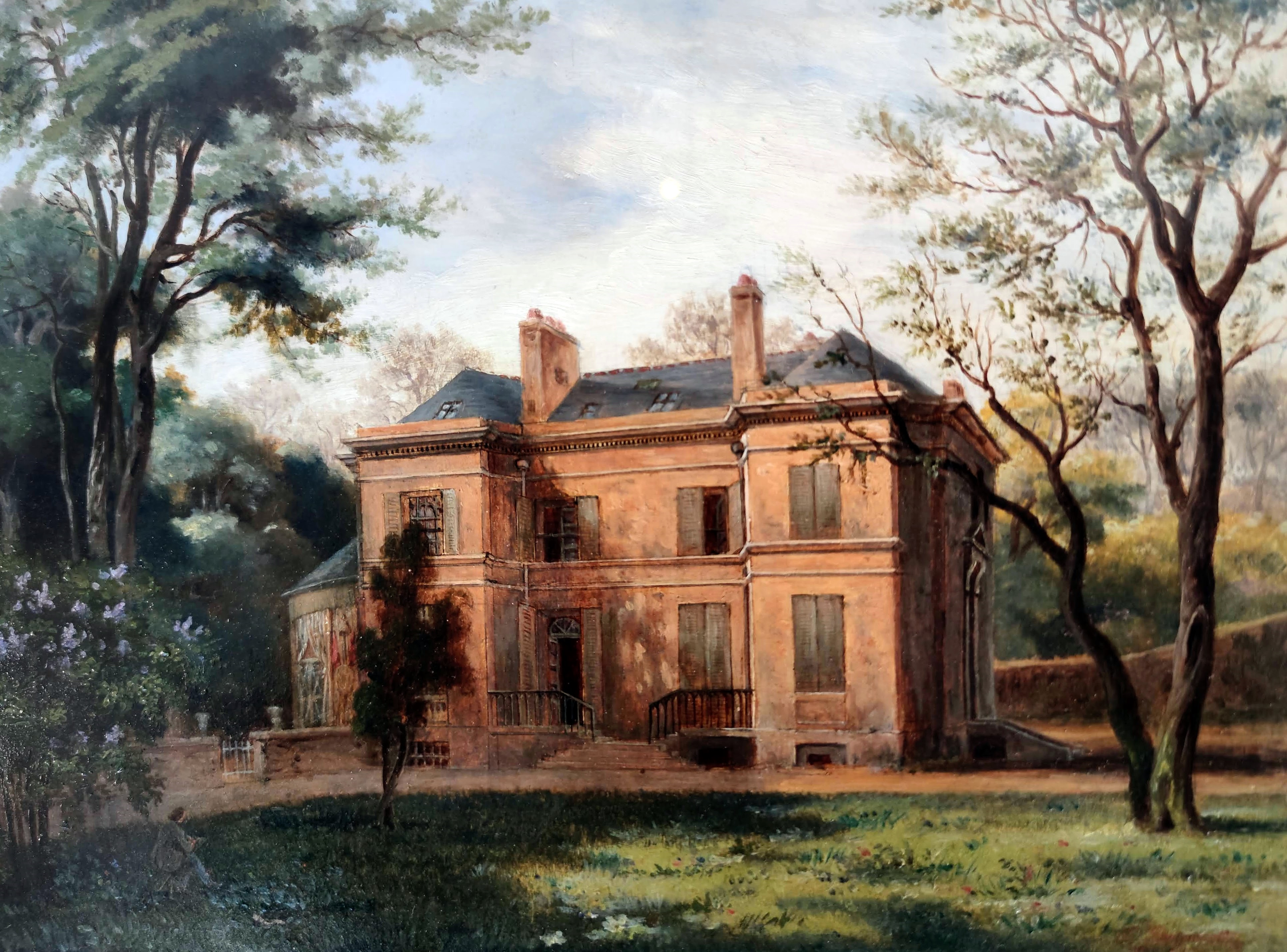
- The garden façade (east side) of the former Hôtel de Ségur, later known as Hôtel Bonaparte, painted by Charles-Nicolas Ransonnette

General information
- Type: Hôtel particulier
- Location: 6 Rue Chantereine, Paris, France
- Construction started: 1776
- Completed: 1778
- Owner: Napoléon Bonaparte (most prominent former owner)

Design and construction
- Architect: François-Victor Perrard de Montreuil (1742–1821) [fr]

The Hôtel Bonaparte, also known as Hôtel de Ségur, Hôtel de la Victoire or Maison du 18 Brumaire, was a historic hôtel particulier located in the 9th arrondissement of Paris, dating largely from the end of 18th century. Due to its illustrious former residents and owners, it was a house of national importance, but ultimately fell victim to reasons of state, although its historical significance was already recognised at that time.

Although later considered historically significant, at the time of its construction, the house was considered rather modest among the aristocracy and the upper middle class due to its size and architecture. However, its location was considered desirable.

== Location ==
The area that later became known as the Arrondissement de l'Opéra was still an inhospitable swampland in the mid-18th century. These marshlands were populated by frogs and true toads that sang there and from which the name Rue Chantereine (singing frogs) was derived.

As part of the city's steady expansion, the area was drained in the second half of the 18th century, after which building speculation began in this area as well. Soon, the Parisian high society also recognised the appeal of this lovely landscape. Accordingly, real estate prices rose rapidly. This development was further intensified in the 19th century after the reconstruction plans for Paris of Emperor Napoléon III and Georges-Eugène Haussmann, Baron Haussmann, became known, which also included the construction of the Opéra Garnier.

== History ==
=== Hôtel de Ségur ===
In 1780, Pierre Victor, Baron de Besenval de Brunstatt, a Swiss military officer in French service, bought this house at 6 Rue Chantereine for his illegitimate son Joseph-Alexandre Pierre, Vicomte de Ségur, or at least the baron financed his son's living there. The Baron de Besenval also helped to furnish the house, partly with furniture from his own house in Paris, the Hôtel de Besenval. The house was then known as the Hôtel de Ségur. It was built by the architect François-Victor Perrard de Montreuil (1742–1821), who in 1776 had bought a large plot of land in this area from the real estate speculator Jacques Louis Guillaume Bouret de Vézelay (1733–1810), on which he built a total of three houses. The smallest of these three houses was this one which later became known as the Hôtel Bonaparte. This was the house where Joseph-Alexandre Pierre de Ségur lived with his then mistress Louise Julie Careau.

There are conflicting statements regarding the ownership of the house, depending on the source of information, sometimes from the same authors. On the one hand, the Vicomte de Ségur is mentioned as the owner of the house, on the other hand only as a tenant and that Louise Julie Careau bought the house in 1781 directly from the architect, who had built the house not for a specific client but as an investment.

=== Hôtel de la Victoire, Hôtel Bonaparte or Maison du 18 Brumaire ===
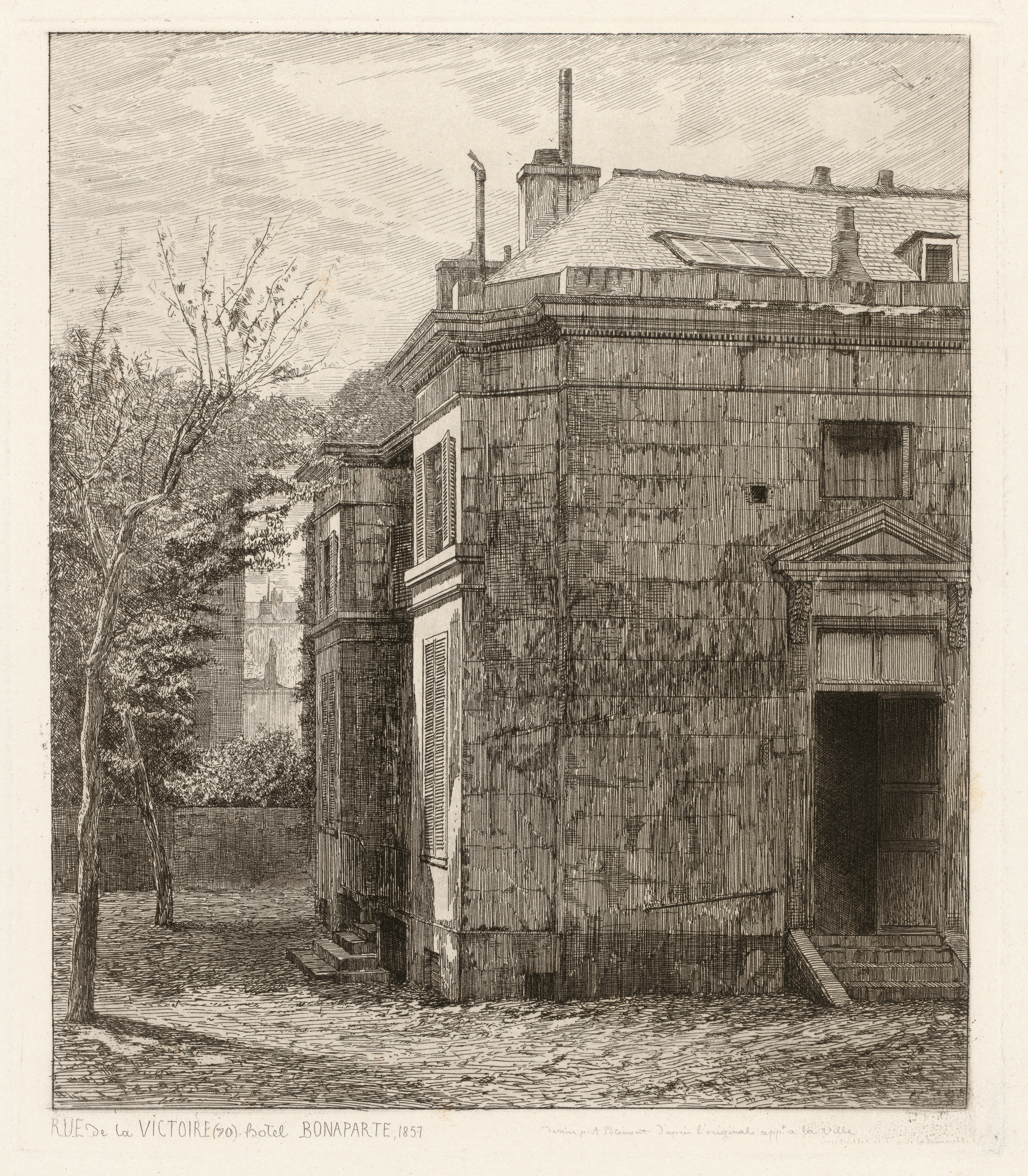
An etching from 1857, the year the house was demolished, showing the entrance from the north side of the Hôtel Bonaparte. This entrance led directly into Napoléon's study.

When the relationship between Joseph-Alexandre Pierre de Ségur and Louise Julie Careau ended at the end of the 1780s, the Vicomte de Ségur either left the house to Louise Julie Careau or he simply moved out and let her live there with their son Alexandre Félix de Ségur (1781–1805).

On 10 August 1795, due to financial difficulties, Louise Julie Careau rented the house to her friend Joséphine de Beauharnais for an annual rent of 4,000 livres. As at the time of the construction of the house, the plot size at that time was still slightly less than 2.000 m^{2}.

On 9 March 1796, Napoléon Bonaparte and Joséphine de Beauharnais celebrated their wedding in this house in private, after having previously married at the Hôtel de Mondragon at 3 Rue d'Antin, then the town hall of the 2nd arrondissement of Paris. The wedding was scheduled for 8 pm, but didn't take place until around 10 pm. Napoleon Bonaparte arrived two hours late, as he was busy preparing for the Italian campaign. To celebrate the victorious Général Napoléon Bonaparte on his return from Italy, the Département de la Seine requested in December 1797 that the name of the Rue Chantereine be changed to Rue de la Victoire. On 26 March 1798, Napoléon Bonaparte acquired the house for his great love Joséphine for 52,400 livres whereupon it became known as the Hôtel Bonaparte. It was also in this house where Napoléon Bonaparte orchestrated the coup d'état that brought him to power on 18 Brumaire of the Year VIII (9 November 1799) whereupon the house also became known as Maison du 18 Brumaire.

"Joséphine's house was the finest in Paris."

— Napoléon Bonaparte on the beauty of the Hôtel Bonaparte

==== The Bonapartes move out, relatives come and go ====
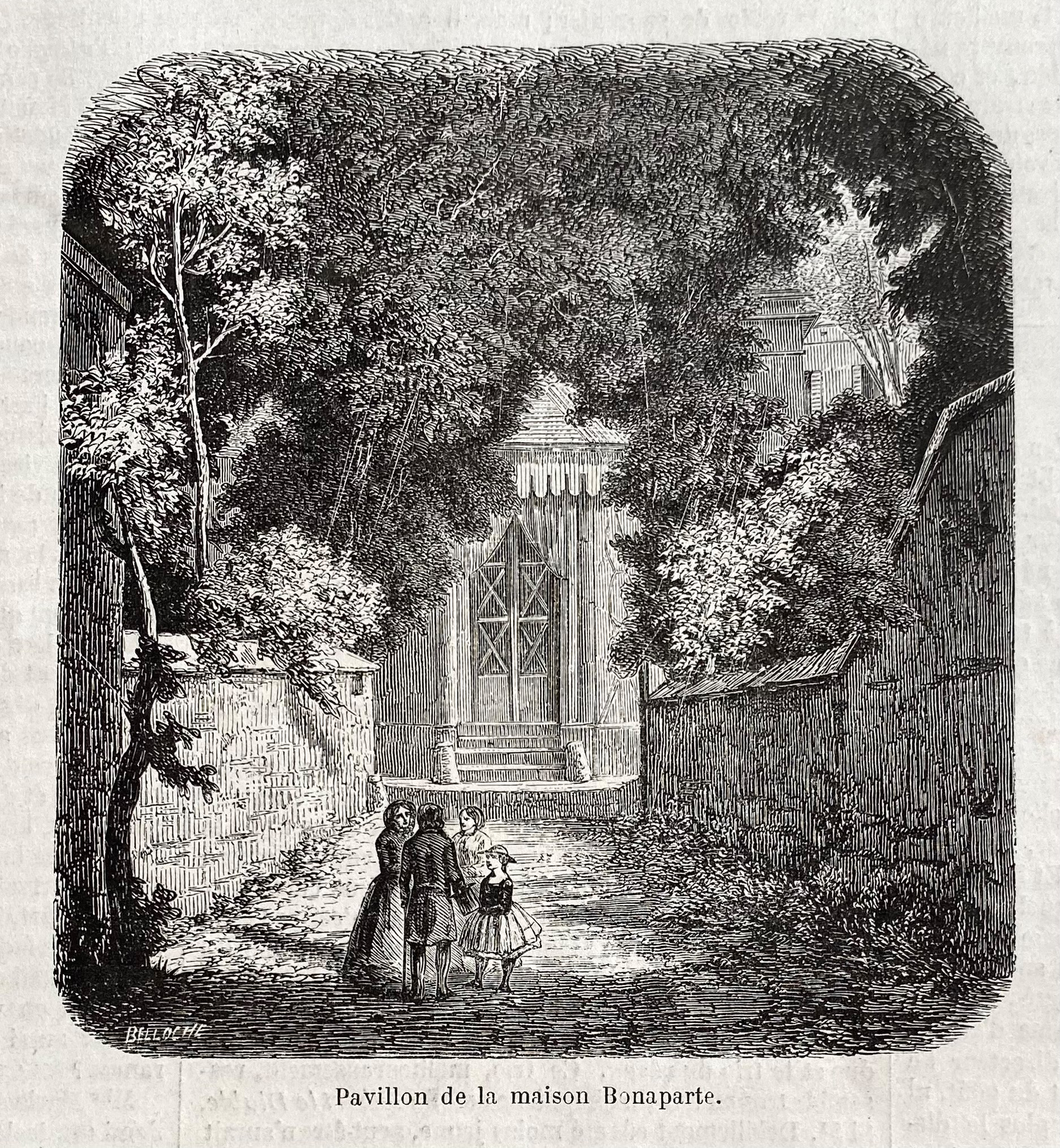
A 19th-century illustration of the entrance pavilion of the Hôtel Bonaparte (south side), seen from the Rue Chantereine.

On 15 November 1799, Joséphine and Napoléon officially moved from the Hôtel Bonaparte to the Petit Luxembourg. However, Napoléon kept the Hôtel Bonaparte. He loved the house. Napoléon personally took care of its maintenance. Between 1803 and 1804, he continually purchased adjacent land, thus expanding the grounds of the Hôtel Bonaparte.

Between 1799 and 1806, Napoléon and Joséphine lodged various people close to them in the Hôtel Bonaparte. Among them were Louis Bonaparte and his wife Hortense de Beauharnais, whose wedding took place in the house on 4 January 1802. The newlywed couple lived in the Hôtel Bonaparte until July 1802. In the same year, the couple moved into the Hôtel Dervieux, also on the Rue de la Victoire, which Napoléon had bought for them. The Hôtel Dervieux, designed by the architect Alexandre-Théodore Brongniart, also had to make way for construction measures for the redesign of Paris in 1863.

From September 1805 until his death on 15 March 1806, Robert-Marguerite, Baron de Tascher de la Pagerie (1740–1806), an uncle of Joséphine, lived in the house. The baron, however, continually complained, saying that this accommodation could only be temporary, as this house was certainly too modest for the empress's uncle. He even threatened to return to his homeland of Martinique in protest if he was not offered better accommodation and indicated that he planned his return trip to Martinique for May 1807. However, he died beforehand at the Hôtel Bonaparte.

==== Main rooms, garden and the entrance pavilion ====
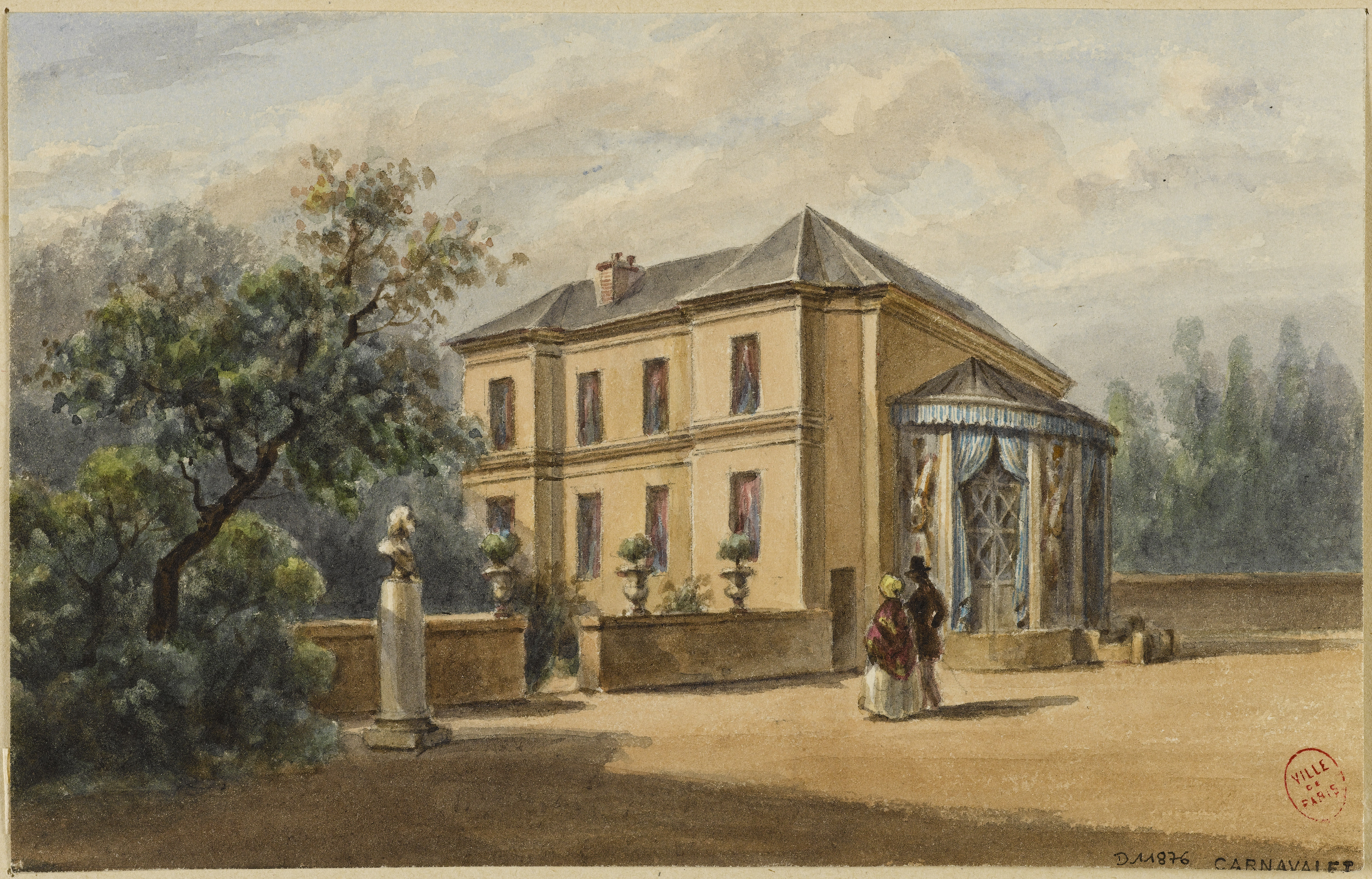
An anonymous 19th-century watercolour of the Hôtel Bonaparte, showing the wooden entrance pavilion on the south side in all its details. Joséphine and Napoléon later had a similar entrance pavilion in the same colours built for the Château de Malmaison. It was the Bonapartes who made this tent architecture popular.

After an approximately 80-meter-long avenue separating two properties, each with a separate hôtel particulier, both also built by the architect François-Victor Perrard de Montreuil, the courtyard and the south entrance of the Hôtel Bonaparte became visible. Opposite the south entrance, to the left and right of the property entrance, were the horse stables (west side) and the coach houses (east side). Although the two buildings were not identical in size, they were both built in the same style as pavilions with mansard roofs flanking the entrance.

The other two hôtels particuliers, left and right of the avenue leading to the Hôtel Bonaparte, later became known as the Hôtel d'Argenson Berthier (east side, demolished), once owned by Louis-Alexandre Berthier, Prince de Neuchâtel et Valangin, Prince de Wagram, and the Hôtel de Saint-Chamans Walewska (west side, still in existence). The Hôtel de Saint-Chamans Walewska became famous as the home of Napléon's mistress Marie Walewska, Comtesse Walewska, who gave birth to Napoléon's illegitimate son Alexandre Florian Joseph, Comte Colonna-Walewski, in 1810.

The Hôtel Bonaparte measured 17 meters by 10 meters. The east side of the house faced the main part of the garden. Both the east and west sides had two terminal symmetrical parallel architectural features known as avant-corps, which rose the entire height of the building, with coped sides connected to each other by a central rectangular building, the corps de logis. In general, the building was a completely symmetrical unit. The east side of the corps de logis had French doors flanking the fireplace. According to a model of the Hôtel Bonaparte on display at the Château de Malmaison, the west side of the corps de logis had the same layout, just without the fireplace. The doors opened onto a terrace with steps leading to the garden and served as informal entrances to the living room (Grand Salon). Although the two sides were identical, due to the orientation of the east side towards the main part of the garden, the east side was mostly immortalised in the paintings and engravings.

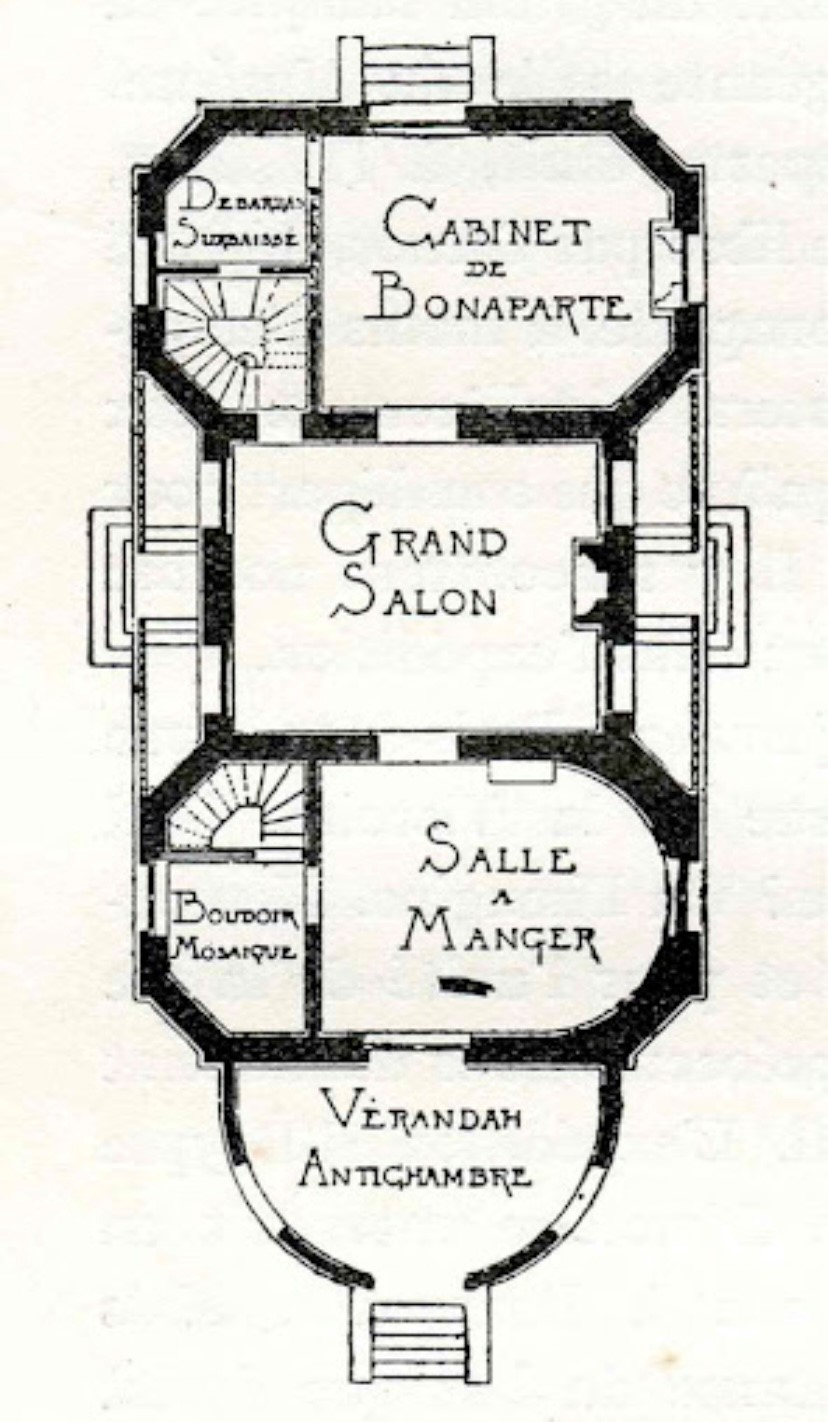
Plan of the ground floor of the Hôtel Bonaparte.

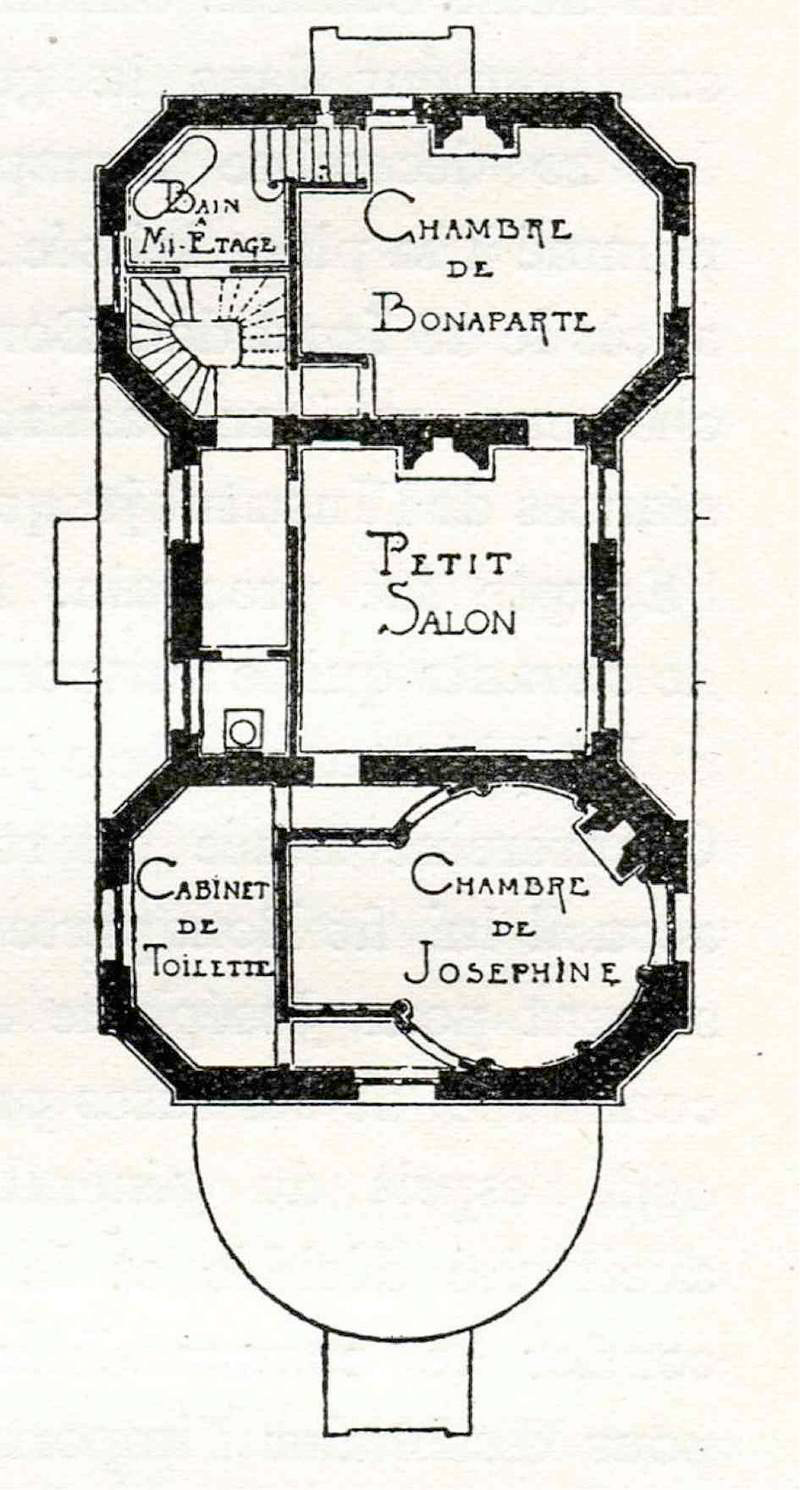
Plan of the floor above the ground floor.

On the south side, the semicircular staircase had been converted into a porch, using a wooden structure with a lead roof, which also served as the entrance. The porch, also called the pavilion, was decorated with carved wooden and gilded war trophies and covered with cotton drill (curtains as well as wall and ceiling coverings). The porch also served as the antechamber to the semicircular dining room. The door on the left in the dining room led into the mosaic salon, called boudoir, on the west side. From the boudoir one reached the stairs that led upstairs. Adjacent to the dining room, in the center of the house, was the large living room, which was equipped with a beautiful fireplace and four cross-windows (french doors). Next to it, the last room on the ground floor, was Napoléon Bonaparte's study, lit by a single window above the fireplace overlooking the garden to the east. The study had its own entrance, the north entrance.

On the floor above the ground floor were Josephine Bonaparte's bedroom with a bathroom, a small living room and Napoléon Bonaparte's bedroom which communicated with the study on the ground floor by a small winding staircase leading to a bathroom halfway up the floor and giving access to the servants' bedrooms arranged in an attic-like space.

Joséphine's semicircular bedroom above the dining room was also called the Pièce aux glaces (mirror room). The room was lined with wall-high, upward-curved mirrors, each panel framed by delicate columns and draped curtains. The entire wall covering was removed before the house was demolished. It later came into the possession of Béatrice Ephrussi de Rothschild. Towards the end of the 19th century, Béatrice Ephrussi de Rothschild acquired a variety of historical architectural elements. These served as decorative elements for her numerous properties, most notably the Villa Ephrussi de Rothschild and the Hôtel Ephrussi-Rothschild at 19 Avenue Foch in Paris, now the seat of the Embassy of Angola.

=== The family Lefebvre-Desnouettes and other residents ===
On 1 July 1806, in recognition of his services, Napoléon Bonaparte gave the Hôtel Bonaparte to his aide-de-camp, Général Charles, Comte Lefebvre-Desnouettes, by letters patent signed at the Château de Saint-Cloud. The donation was also made in view of Charles, Comte Lefebvre-Desnouettes', upcoming wedding to Marie Louise Stéphanie Rolier (1787–1880), whose mother, née Benielli, was a first cousin of Napoléon Bonaparte. It was Napoléon's wedding present. The family kept the house in their possession for over 50 years.

After the death of the Comte Lefebvre-Desnouettes in 1822, his widow decided to rent the house. First to the Maréchal Henri Gatien Bertrand. From 1830, Jacques Coste, one of the founders of the newspaper Le Temps, lived in the house. And from 1846 to 1852, the Pension Boudet, a private educational institution, occupied the house. Afterwards, a therapeutic establishment, called Les Néothermes, was established in the Hôtel Bonaparte.

==== The watercolour by the Comte de Reiset of the Hôtel Bonaparte ====
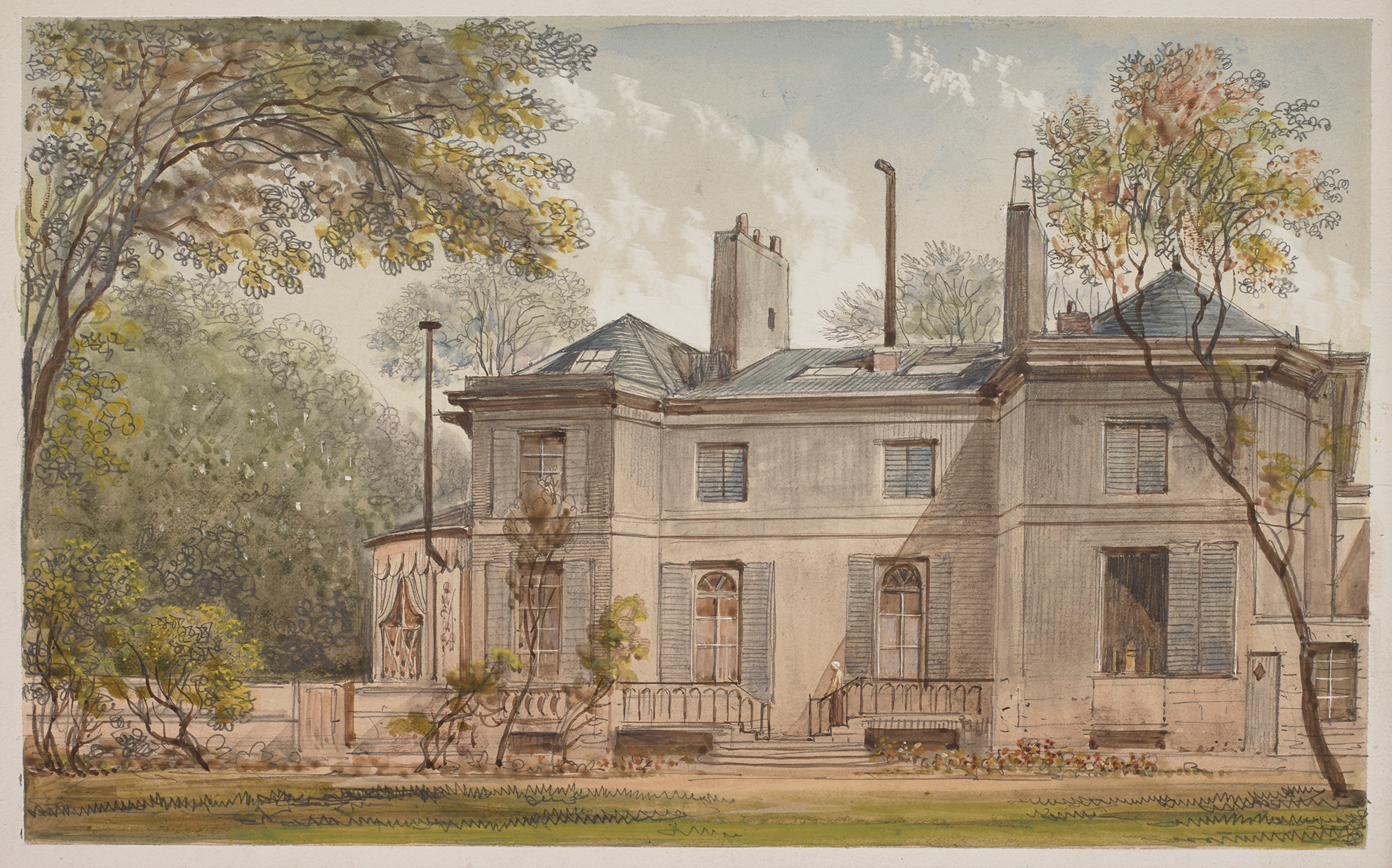
A watercolour by Gustave, Comte de Reiset, of the east side of the Hôtel Bonaparte from 1856. Gustave de Reiset foresaw that the fate of this historic house was sealed due to the development of the city. The watercolour is owned by the Fondation Napoléon.

When Gustave, Comte de Reiset, married Marie Ernestine Blanche Lefebvre de Sancy de Parabère (1836–1905) on 20 May 1856, granddaughter of Général Charles, Comte Lefebvre-Desnouettes, he felt that the fate of the Hôtel Bonapart was sealed. Due to his position as a diplomat and the family ties of his wife's family to the imperial family, he was familiar with the plans of Emperor Napoléon III and Baron Haussmann for the urban development of Paris.

At the same time, the Comte de Reiset was aware that this building was of historical importance. This is why he rushed to produce a watercolour of the Hôtel Bonaparte in June 1856.

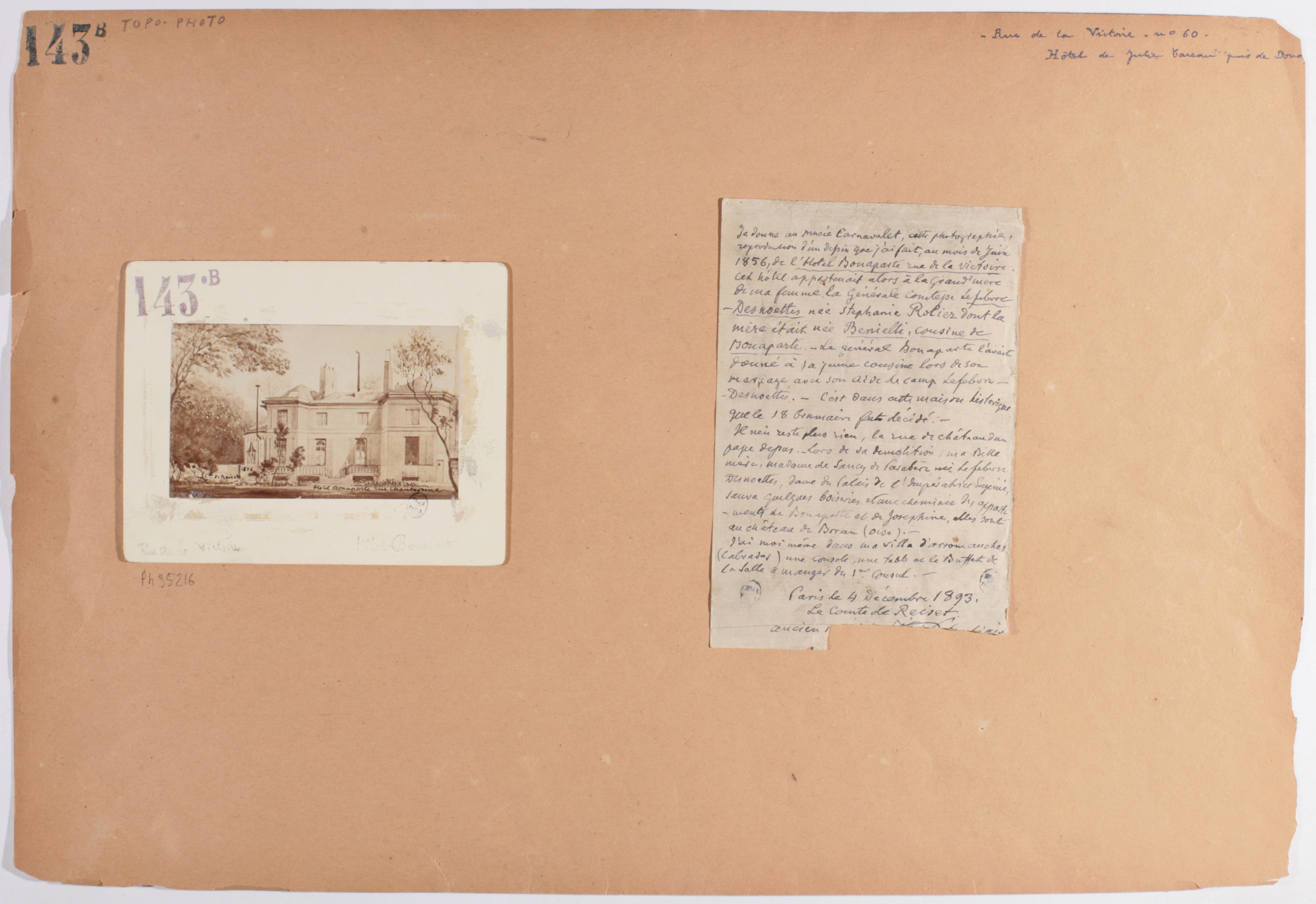
The letter and the photograph that the Comte de Reiset sent to the Musée Carnavalet in 1893, which prove his authorship of the watercolour.

It is thanks to a photograph of this watercolour, accompanied by a letter from Gustave de Reiset dated 4 December 1893, now preserved at the Musée Carnavalet, that it is possible to affirm that he is the author of this watercolour. Gustave de Reiset specifies in his letter that he made this drawing in June 1856.

With this often reproduced watercolour, the Comte de Reiset created the most famous painting of the exterior of the Hôtel Bonaparte. The Comte de Reiset naturally also had access to the interior of the house, where he made sketches of selected rooms, including Napoléon's study. The sketch indicates, under the ceiling cornice, the location of a decoration which corresponds to that of the famous painted frieze, generally placed in Napoléon's study rooms in his various residences.

In addition, Gustave de Reiset explains that he keeps at home, in his house in Normandy, some furniture that was previously in the Hôtel Bonaparte and which would have belonged to Napoléon Bonaparte. Other furnishings that were once in the Hôtel Bonaparte are now part of the collections of the Château de Malmaison, the château that Joséphine bought in April 1799.

=== A victim of the urban planning of Baron Haussmann on behalf of Emperor Napoléon III ===
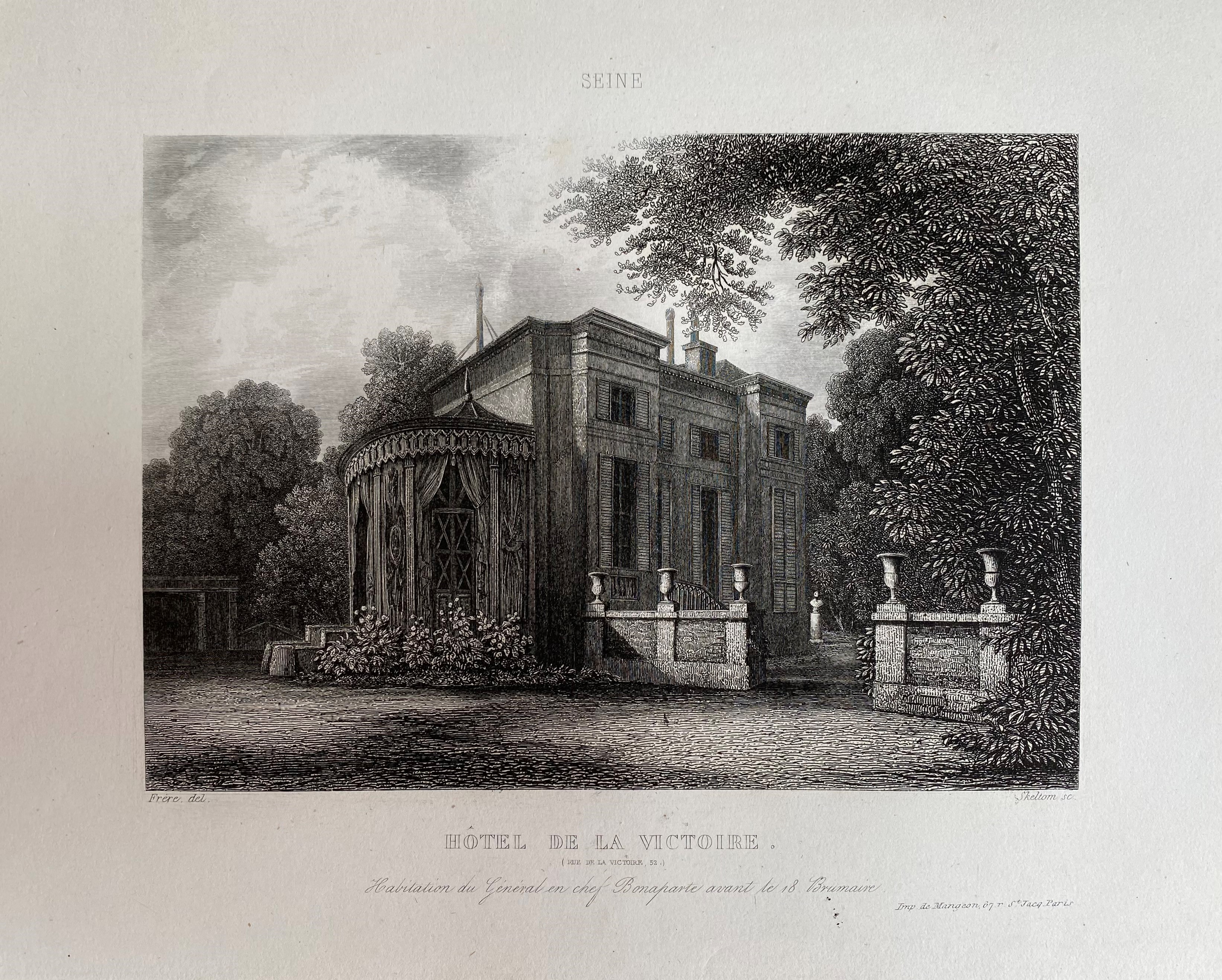
The Hôtel Bonaparte soon enjoyed the informal status of a Monument historique. Accordingly, paintings and engravings were made of it, which also served as souvenirs for Napoléon admirers. Engraving by Joseph John Skelton from 1850.

On 2 April 1857, the widow of Général Charles, Comte Lefebvre-Desnouettes, Marie Louise Stéphanie, Comtesse Lefebvre-Desnouettes, née Rolier (1787–1880), sold the Hôtel Bonaparte with its 3.650 m^{2} plot to Émile Goubie for FRF 625,000.

In the same year, in the winter of 1857, the house was demolished due to the construction works for the Rue de Châteaudun, formerly called Rue Ollivier.

"My grandfather was powerless to save the Hôtel Bonaparte, whose demolition had been decreed in view of the projected Rue Ollivier. That building, which preserved so many cherished memories, was doomed to vanish by an expropriation decree in the public interest. Émile Goubie could do no more than submit to this order. He even surrendered the land required for the projected street to the city of Paris without compensation."

— Letter to the editor of the weekly newspaper L'Illustration from Pierre Goubie, lawyer at the court of Paris and grandson of the last owner of the Hôtel Bonaparte, Émile Goubie, published on 24 November 1928

The Hôtel Bonaparte was therefore not a victim of building speculation, but of the urban planning of Georges-Eugène Haussmann, Baron Haussmann, and Emperor Napoléon III, who instructed the baron to bring air and light to the centre of Paris.

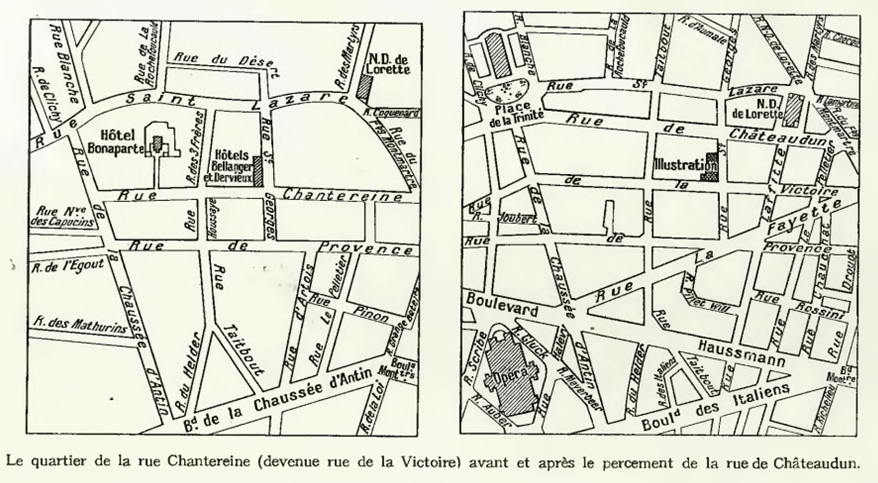
An early 20th-century map of the 9th arrondissement of Paris, showing the former location of the Hôtel Bonaparte, before and after the construction work for the Rue de Châteaudun.

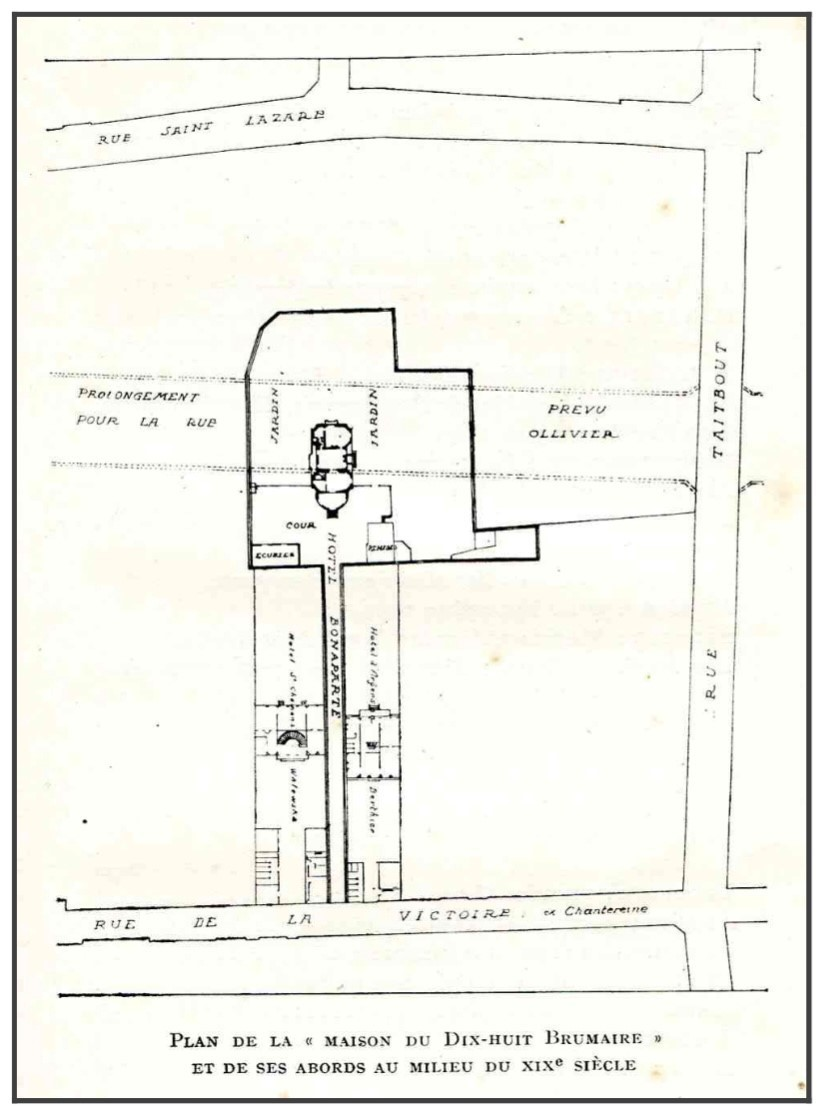
Site plan with the planned extension of the Rue Ollivier (now Rue de Châteaudun) through the Hôtel Bonaparte.

Considering the appreciation with which Emperor Napoléon III treated the legacy of his uncle Emperor Napoléon I, it was difficult for his contemporaries to understand why he allowed the demolition of the Hôtel Bonaparte. Before the house's demolition, parts of the interior fittings were removed and sold and later reinstalled in other properties, including those belonging to the family de Rothschild, but also in other houses belonging to the family Bonaparte. These include the Villa Ephrussi de Rothschild and the former Parisian townhouse of Roland Bonaparte at 10 Avenue d'Iéna, which opened in 2010 as the luxury Hôtel Shangri-La Paris.

The former access to the Hôtel Bonaparte from the Rue de la Victoire now corresponds roughly to the address 60 Rue de la Victoire, whereas the house itself was located closer to 49 and 51 Rue de Châteaudun.
