= Rue Joubert =

Street in Paris, France

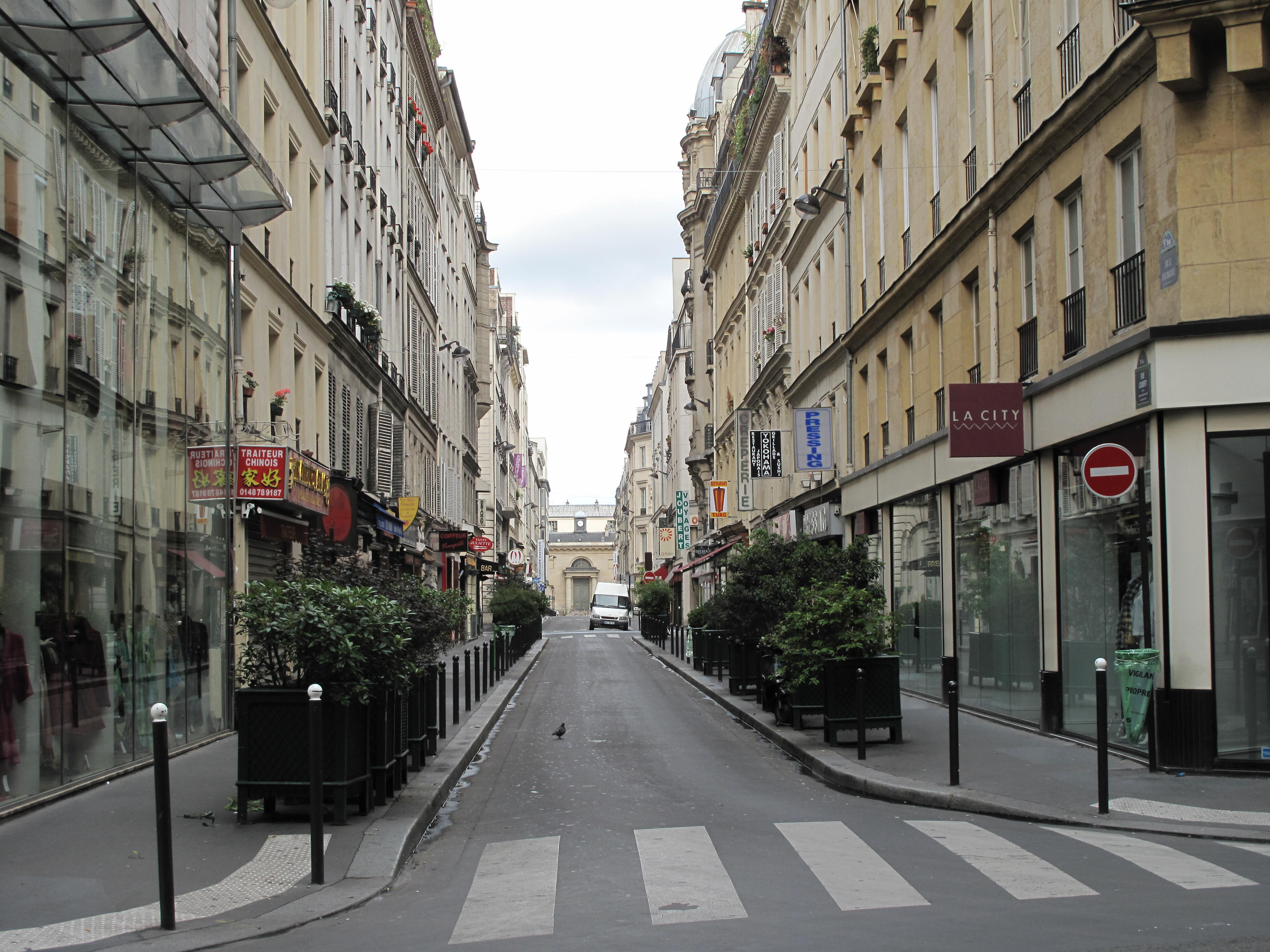
- Rue Joubert

- Location within Paris
- Arrondissement: 9th
- Quarter: Chaussée d'Antin
- Coordinates: 48°52′28.54″N 2°19′53.42″E
- From: Rue de la Chaussée-d'Antin
- To: Rue Caumartin

The Rue Joubert is a street in the 9th arrondissement of Paris, France.

It is named after General Barthélemy Catherine Joubert, who was fatally wounded at the Battle of Novi in 1799.

At no. 20 (junction with the Rue de la Victoire) is the former mansion of the French architect François-Joseph Bélanger, which he rebuilt in Pompeiian style for his wife Mademoiselle Dervieux, a dancer, after his release from Saint-Lazare Prison during the French Revolution.

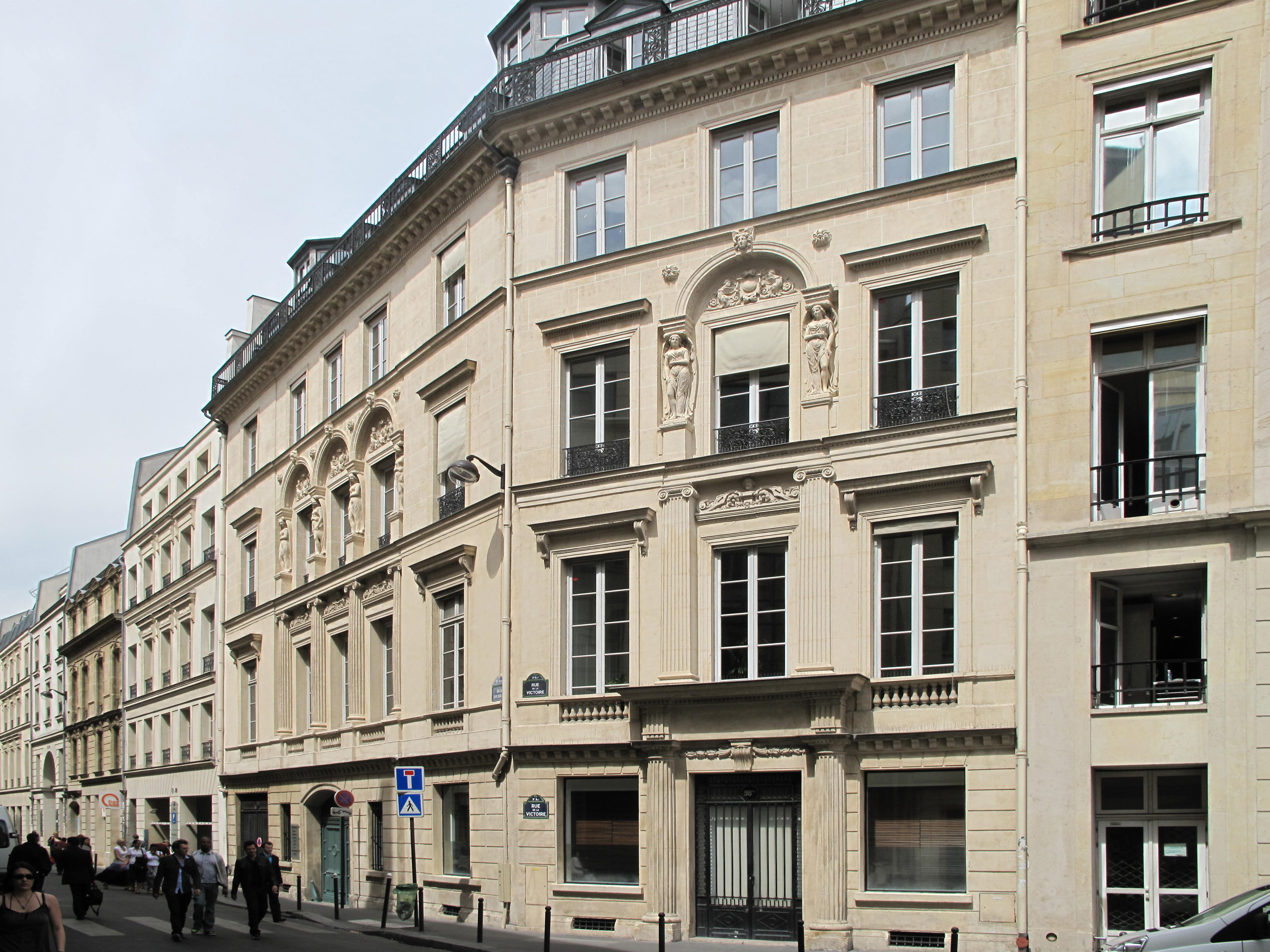
Mansion of Mlle Dervieux, built by the architect Bélanger

| Located near the Metro stations: Havre - Caumartin, Chaussée d'Antin - La Fayette and Trinité - d'Estienne d'Orves. |
