= Templetrine Church =

Anglican church in Cork, Ireland

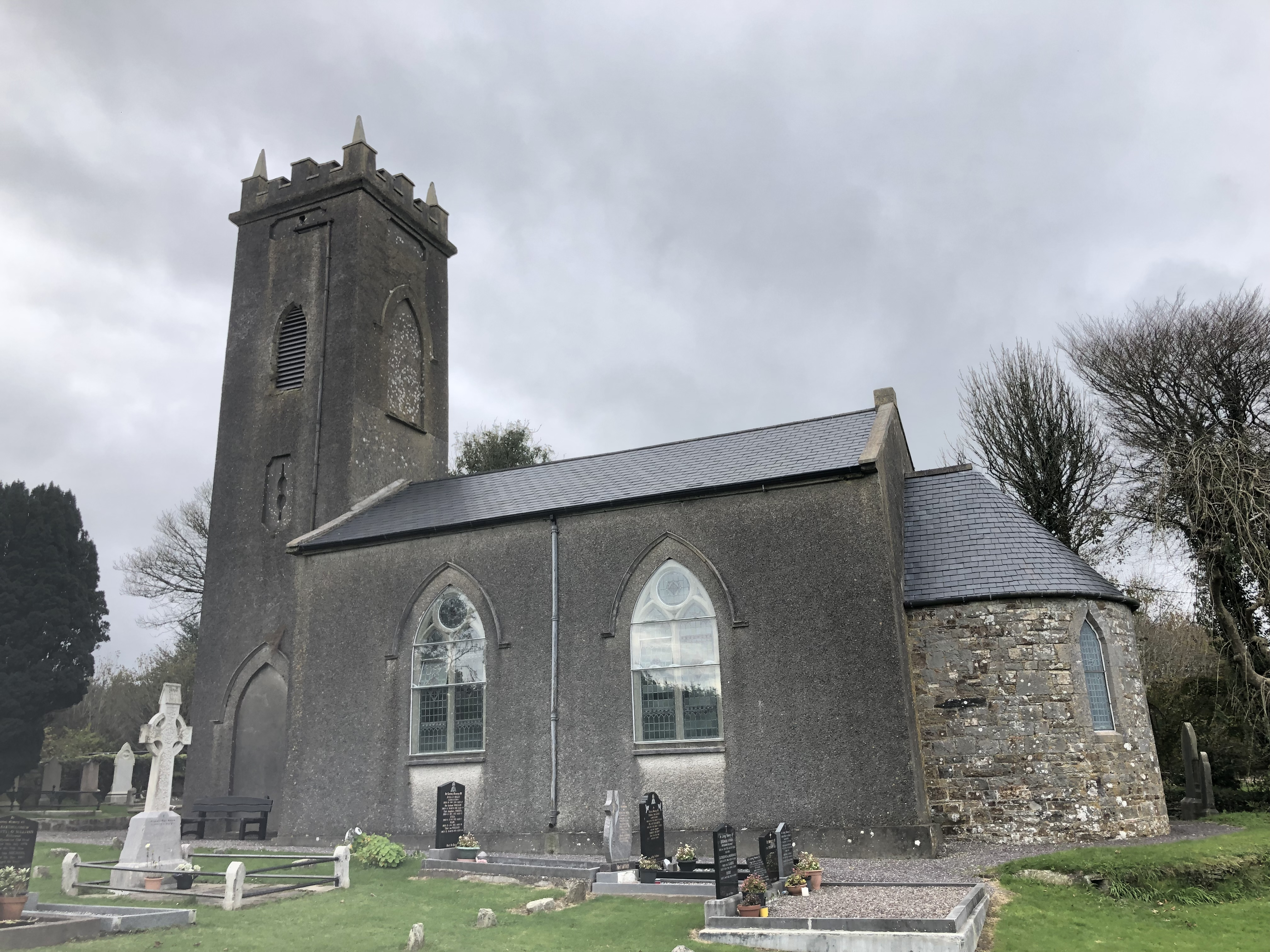
- Templetrine Church
- 51.6629°N 8.6145°W
- Country: Ireland
- Denomination: Church of Ireland
- Previous denomination: Roman Catholic
- Website: kinsale.cork.anglican.org

Architecture
- Architect: unknown
- Style: Early English

Clergy
- Rector: Rev Peter Rutherford

Templetrine Church, also called the Chapel of Traghne and the Church of the Holy Trinity, is a small Early English style Anglican church located near Ballinspittle, County Cork, Ireland. It was first completed in its current form 1821. It is part of the Kinsale Union of Parishes in the Diocese of Cork, Cloyne, and Ross.

== History ==
Templetrine Church is built on the site of an earlier Roman Catholic church dedicated to Saint Treun, a disciple of Fin Barre of Cork which dates back to pre-Reformation times, at least as far back as 1302. A record dating from 1588 shows that Templetrine was a newly reformed Protestant church. On 22 June 1639, an inspection of the church found that its rectory was intact, and its chancel was undergoing repairs. In the 1680s the church again underwent major repairs.

From 18 October 1692 to 1714, Edward Synge was rector of the church. He would go on to become the Archbishop of Tuam.

The church alternated between serving as a Protestant and a Catholic church for many years, with the last attempted appointment of a Catholic priest being Fr Thomas Rochfort in 1818. Despite this attempt, John Rogerson Cotter, an Anglican rector, was appointed on 20 June 1818 by Letter Patent of 13 May which stated that "in His Majesty's Disposal, Thomas Rochfort being a papist and therefore incapacitated."

The current church building dates from 1821, and was funded by a gift from the Board of First Fruits. It was built because the church last repaired in the 1680s was prohibitively expensive to repair. They made a gift of IR£900 for the construction of the church. The further donated £100 and loaned £825 for the construction of the parish's glebe-house. It is unknown who designed the church. A vestry and chancel were added in 1866, as was an apse.

== Architecture ==
The church, built in the Early English style, has a three-stage crenellated square tower on the west side of the building. Many aspects of its design are typical of the Board of First Fruits style. The chancel and the vestry were later additions to the original building. The church is a two-bay hall, featuring wide, twin-light Gothic windows, the tracery of which dates to the mid 20th century.

There is a stained-glass depiction of Christ as the light of the world on a lancet window in the chancel which dates from ~1900.
