= Ballinspittle =

Village in County Cork, Ireland

Ballinspittle Béal Átha an Spidéil
- Village
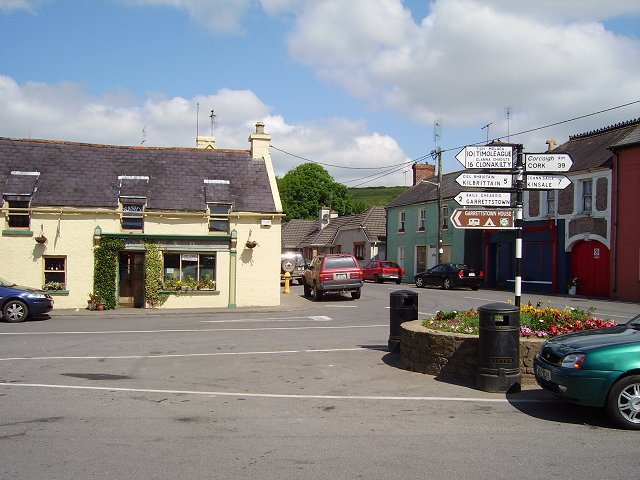
- Ballinspittle village centre

- Location in Ireland
- Coordinates: 51°40′N 8°36′W
- Country: Ireland
- Province: Munster
- County: County Cork
- Barony: Courceys

Population (2022)
  - Total: 369
- Time zone: UTC+0 (WET)
  - Summer (DST): UTC-1 (IST (WEST))

Ballinspittle (Irish: Béal Átha an Spidéil, meaning 'ford mouth of the hospital') is a village in County Cork, Ireland. It is in the barony of Courceys and lies about 8 km (5 mi) southwest of Kinsale, on the R600 road. It is near Garrylucas and Garrettstown Blue Flag beaches.

The village is a community with new housing estates, businesses, a post office, a national school and a Gaelic Athletic Association facility known as the Jim O' Regan Memorial Park.

== History ==
=== Built heritage ===
Ancient historical sites in the area include Ballycatten Fort, which dates from the sixth century, and Curtapurteen, which, according to legend, Saint Patrick once visited. The most southerly tip the Old Head of Kinsale is a site of ancient and present-day lighthouses, as well as a golf links. Templetrine Church, built in the 1820s, is located nearby.

=== Moving statue ===
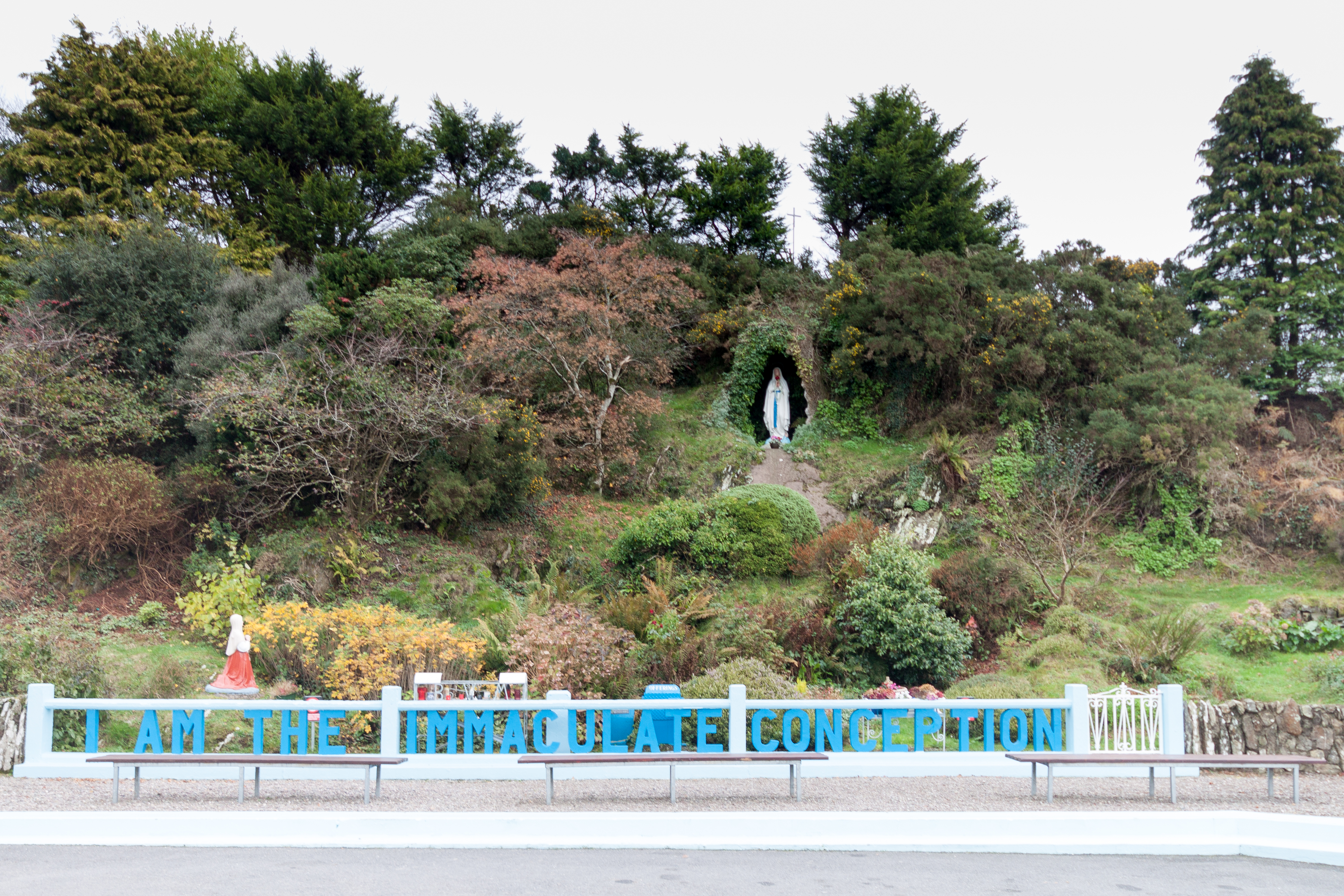
Blessed Virgin Mary of Ballinspittle Moving Statue

In the summer of 1985, Ballinspittle received national and international attention when inhabitants claimed to have witnessed a statue of the Blessed Virgin Mary moving spontaneously. As news of the phenomenon spread, thousands of pilgrims and spectators flocked to the site of the statue. Many visitors claimed to have observed the spontaneous movements. The Catholic Clergy in Ireland maintained a neutral stance in regard to the authenticity of the claims.

== Transport ==
Bus Éireann route 226 serves Ballinspittle on Sundays only during summer, linking it to Garretstown and Kinsale (where onward connections for Cork Airport and Cork city are available). Until June 2013 Bus Éireann route 249 also served Ballinspittle two days per week year-round. The Bus Éireann Garrettstown service no longer runs as of 2014.

Ballinspittle sits over the PTAT-1 transatlantic fibre optic cable.

== Sport ==
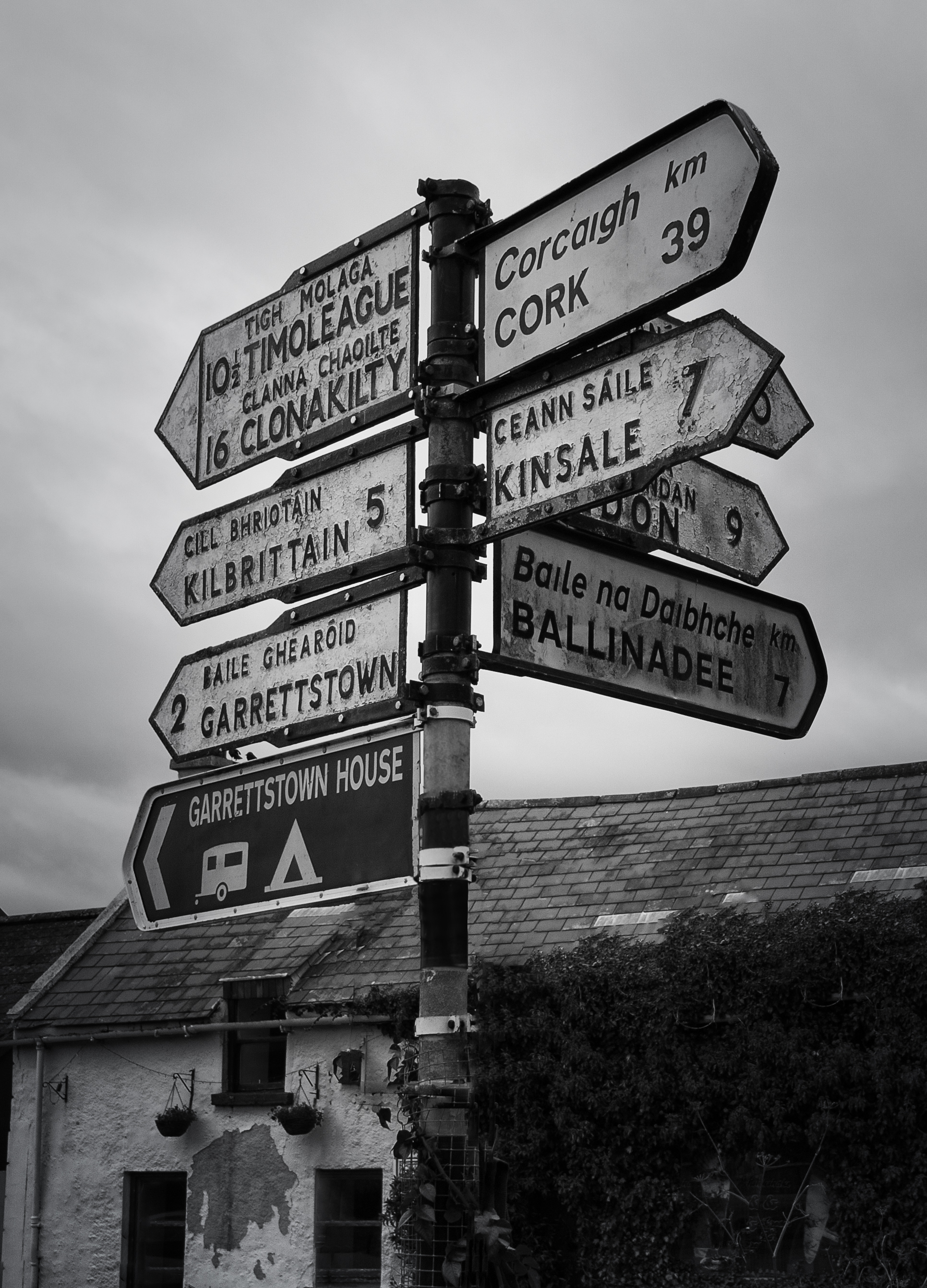
Road signage in Ballinspittle

Courcey Rovers GAA is the local Gaelic Athletic Association club based in Ballinspittle and Ballinadee. De Courcey Albion, a local soccer club based in Ballinspittle and Ballinadee, closed in 2016.

== Notable people ==
The Irish tenor Finbar Wright grew up in the townland of Kilmore just outside the village.

== Festivals ==
A summer festival has been held in the town since 2001. It features live bands on the Village Centre Festival Stage. The neighbouring village of Ballinadee hosts events on the weekend prior to Ballinspittle Festival. The village receives an annual influx of summer visitors, including from Cork city.

Community events include historical walks, road bowling, markets, family athletics, and a visit by the Courtmacsherry Lifeboat.
