= Horace His de la Salle =

French art collector (1795-1878)

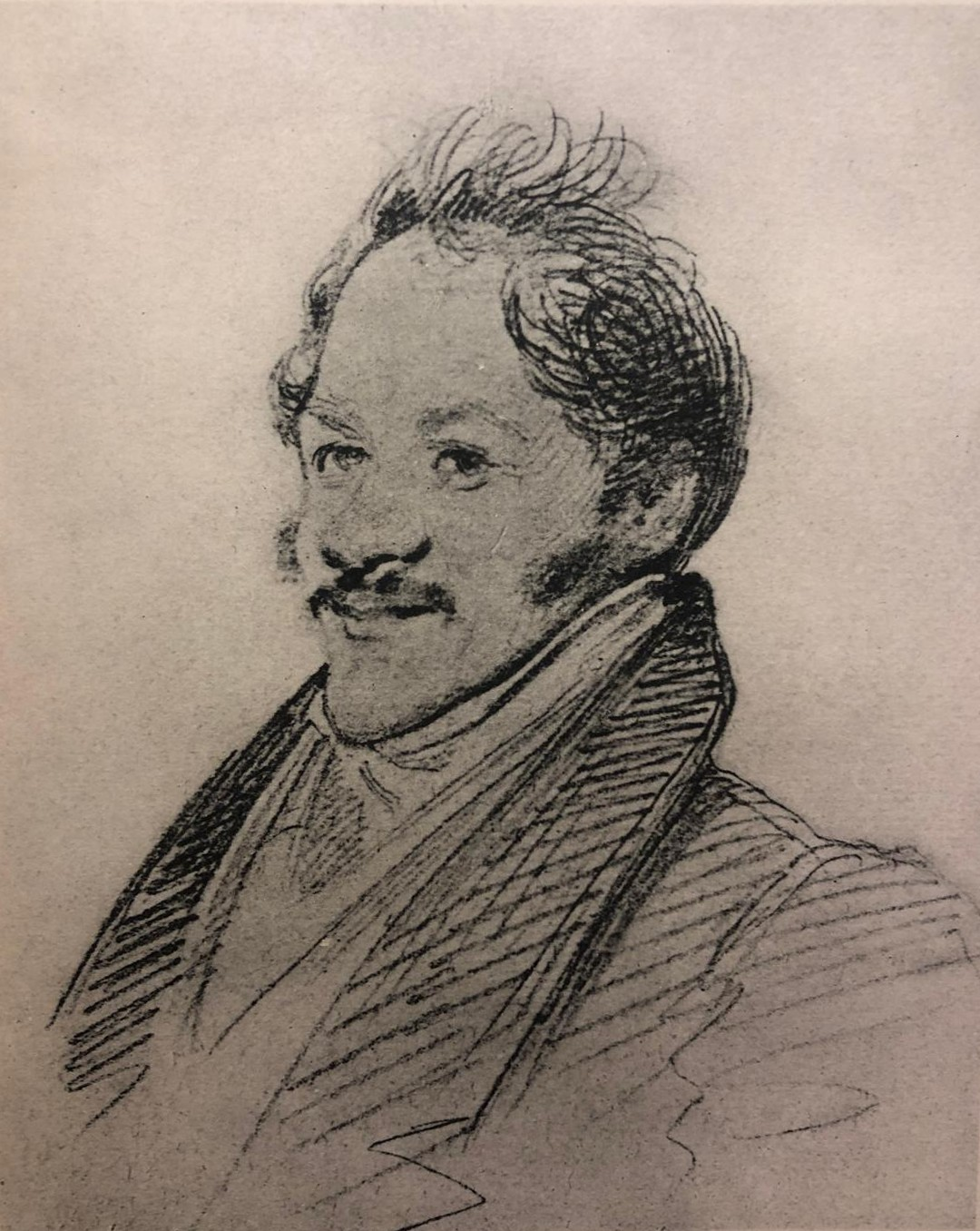
- Born: 11 February 1795; Paris France
- Died: 1878 (aged 82–83)
- Occupation: art collector

Horace His de la Salle (1795-1878) was a French art collector, mainly collecting drawings. He donated a large part of his collection to French museums, including 21 paintings and 450 drawings to the Louvre.

== Collection ==
Lucas van Leyden, Portrait d'homme de face, portant un chapeau à larges bords, one masterpiece drawing given to the Louvre museum

The collection included drawings by a lot of masters going from Nicolas Poussin, Théodore Géricault, or Pierre-Paul Prud'hon to Fra Angelico, Maurice Quentin de la Tour, or Lucas van Leyden.
