= Gabriel Adrien Robinet de Cléry =

French magistrate, historian and legal writer

Gabriel Adrien Robinet de Cléry (18 August 1836 - 1914) was a French magistrate, historian and legal writer active during the Second French Empire and the Third French Republic. He was a convinced Legitimist. He was born in Metz and died in Anhée (Belgium), when bombs hit his house during World War I.
