= Marie Antoine de Reiset =

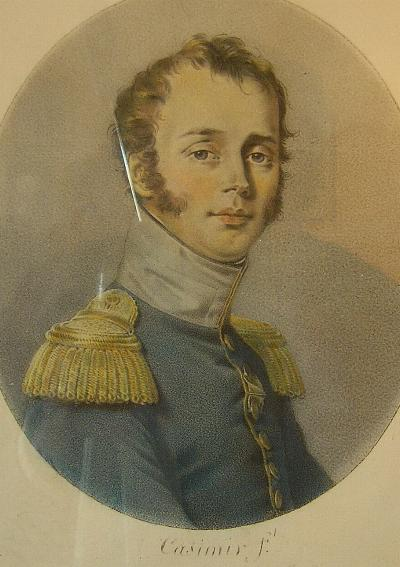
de Reiset in 1809 whilst colonel of the 13th Dragoons.

Marie-Antoine, vicomte de Reiset (French: [maʁi ɑ̃twan də ʁɛzɛ]; 29 November 1775 – 25 March 1836) was a French general during the French Revolutionary Wars and the Napoleonic Wars, serving from 1793 to 1830.

He was born in Colmar into a noble family, the seventh of seventeen children. He captured Prince Augustus of Prussia at the battle of Jena in 1806 and commanded the 13th Dragoon Regiment from 1810 to 1813, including its major part in defeating the Duke of Wellington's vanguard at the Battle of Majadahonda. He forced several regiments to surrender at Dresden in 1813, defended the fortress of Mainz and commanded the French army of occupation in Catalonia. He died in Rouen.
