= Closing argument =

Concluding statement of each party's counsel in a trial

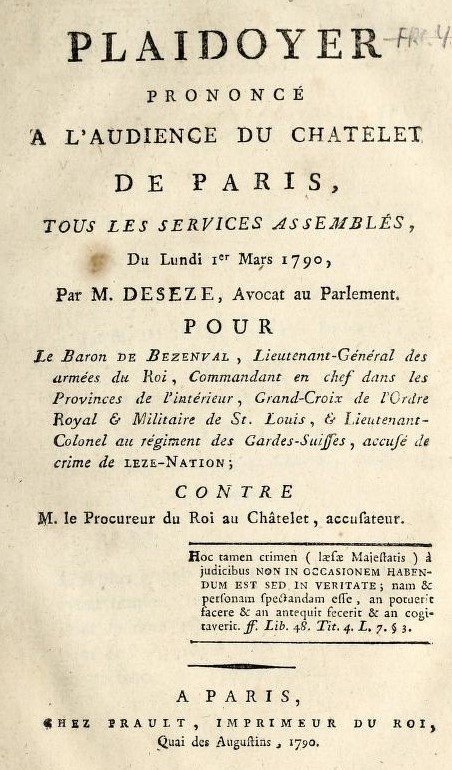
The frontispiece of the closing argument (plaidoyer) from 1 March 1790 in the Affaire de M. le Baron de Besenval, by Raymond Desèze, lawyer of Pierre Victor, Baron de Besenval de Brunstatt. The baron was charged with the crime of lèse-nation. It was one of the most sensational court cases in connection with the French Revolution.

A closing argument, summation, or summing up is the concluding statement of each party's counsel reiterating the important arguments for the trier of fact, often the jury, in a court case. A closing argument occurs after the presentation of evidence. A closing argument may not contain any new information and may only use evidence introduced at trial. It is not customary to raise objections during closing arguments, except for egregious behavior. However, such objections, when made, can prove critical later in order to preserve appellate issues.

== In particular cases ==
In the United States, the plaintiff is generally entitled to open the argument. The defendant usually goes second. The plaintiff or prosecution is usually then permitted a final rebuttal argument. In some jurisdictions, however, this form is condensed, and the prosecution or plaintiff goes second, after the defense, with no rebuttals. Either party may waive their opportunity to present a closing argument.

During closing arguments, counsel may not (among other restrictions) vouch for the credibility of witnesses, indicate their personal opinions of the case, comment on the absence of evidence that they themselves have caused to be excluded, or attempt to exhort the jury to irrational, emotional behavior.

In some countries (e.g. France or Germany), in criminal cases, the defendant's counsel always makes their closing argument last, after the public prosecutor or any other party. Sometimes the defendant is allowed to address the court directly after his or her counsel's closing argument.

In a criminal law cases, the prosecution will restate all the evidence which helps prove each element of the offence. In the United States, there are often several limits as to what the prosecution may or may not say, including precluding the prosecution from using a defendant's exercise of his Fifth Amendment right to silence as evidence of guilt. One of the most important restrictions on prosecutors, however, is against shifting the burden of proof, or implying that the defense must put on evidence or somehow prove the innocence of the defendant.

In some cases, a judge's presentation of the jury instruction is also known as summing up. In this case, the judge is merely articulating the law and questions of fact upon which the jury is asked to deliberate.

The purposes and techniques of closing argument are taught in courses on Trial Advocacy. The closing is often planned early in the trial planning process. The attorneys will integrate the closing with the overall case strategy through either a theme and theory or, with more advanced strategies, a line of effort. The prosecution should also state the main points and be sure to give their side of the argument and to be emotional.

== See also ==
- Opening statement
