= Thomas de Mahy, Marquis de Favras =

French royalist aristocrat (1744–1790)

Thomas de Mahy
- Marquis de Favras
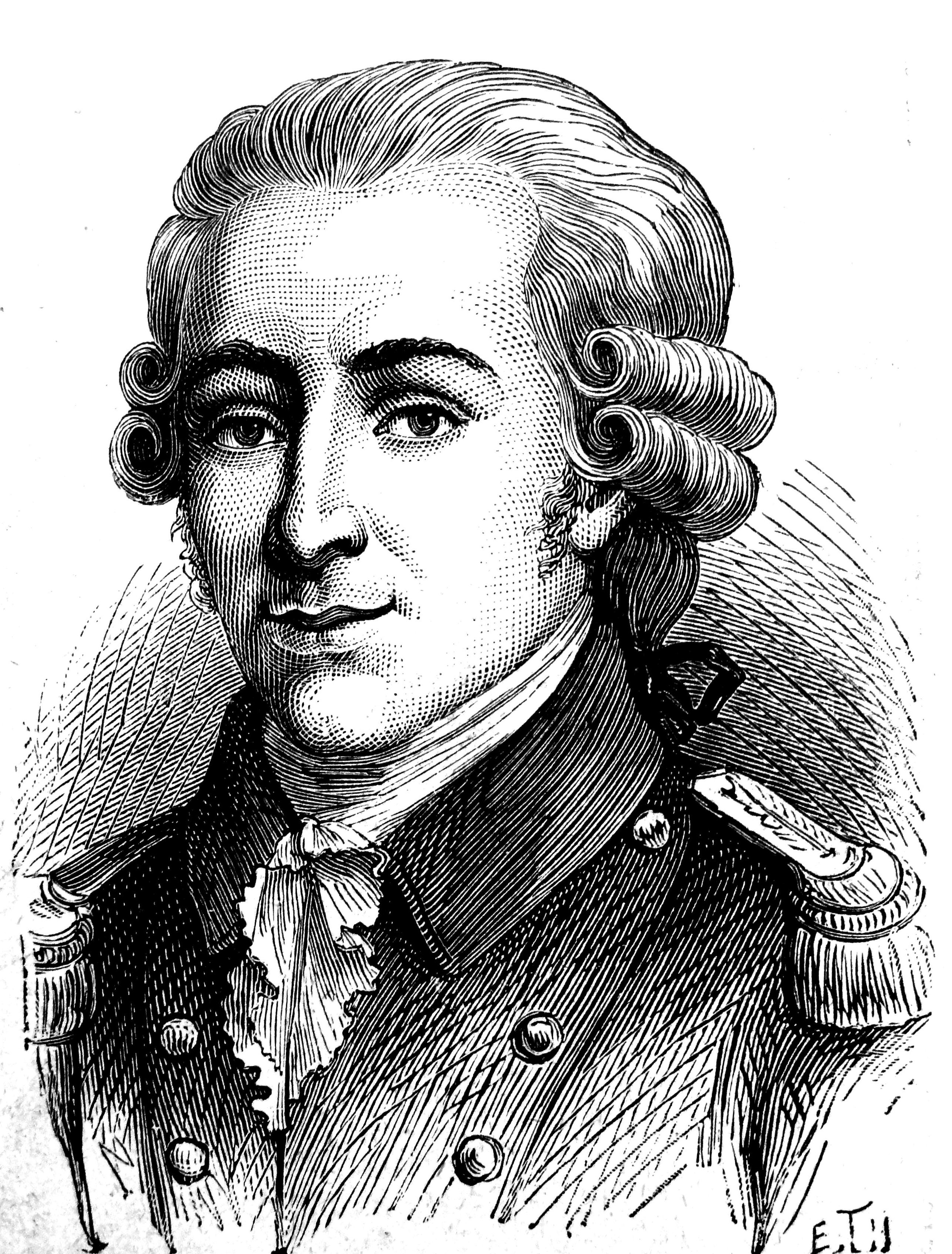
- Born: 26 March 1744; Blois, Orléanais, France
- Died: 19 February 1790 (aged 45); Place de Grève, Paris, France
- Military career
- Branch: Royal French Army
- Service years: 1755–1772
- Rank: Colonel
- Conflict: Seven Years' War
- Awards: Order of Saint Louis (1772)

Thomas de Mahy, Marquis de Favras (26 March 1744 – 18 February 1790), was a French aristocrat and supporter of the House of Bourbon during the French Revolution. Often seen as a martyr of the Royalist cause, Favras was executed for his part in "planning against the people of France" under the Count of Provence.

== Early life, family and education ==
Born in Favras near Blois, he belonged to an impoverished family whose nobility dated from the 12th century.

== Career ==
At age 17, he was a captain of dragoons, and saw some service in the closing campaign of the Seven Years' War. In 1772 he became a first lieutenant in the Gardes Suisses of King Louis XVI's younger brother, the Count of Provence. Unable to meet the expenses of his rank, which was equivalent to that of a colonel in the army, he retired in 1775.

In 1787, he was authorized to raise a "patriotic legion" to help the Dutch Republic against the Stadtholder William V and his Prussian allies.

Returning to Paris in 1789, he became involved in Royalist plans initiated by his former employer, the Count of Provence, to save the King and end the French Revolution. In order to finance this venture, Provence (using one of his gentlemen, the Count of La Châtre, as an intermediary) commissioned Favras to negotiate a loan of two million francs from the bankers Schaumel and Sartorius.

== Personal life ==
In 1776, Favras married Baroness Viktoria Hedwig Karoline of Bärenthal, whose mother, after being deserted by her husband Karl Louis, Prince of Anhalt-Bernburg-Schaumburg-Hoym, in 1749, had found refuge with her daughter in the house of Charles, Prince of Soubise. After his marriage, Favras went to Vienna to attempt the restitution of his wife's parental rights, and spent some time in Warsaw.

== Arrest, trial, and execution ==
It was stated in a leaflet circulated throughout Paris on 23 December 1789 that Favras had been hired by the Count of Provence to organize an elaborate plot against the people of France. In this plot, the King, Queen, and their children were to be rescued from the Tuileries Palace and spirited out of the country. Then the Count of Provence was to be declared regent of the kingdom with absolute power.

Simultaneously, a force of 30,000 soldiers was to encircle Paris. In the ensuing confusion, the city's three main liberal leaders—Jacques Necker, the popular finance minister; Jean Sylvain Bailly, the mayor of Paris; and the Marquis de La Fayette, the commander of the city's new National Guard—were to be assassinated. Afterwards, the revolutionary city was to be starved into submission by cutting off its food supplies.

As a consequence of the leaflet, Favras and his wife were arrested the next day and imprisoned in the Prison de l'Abbaye. Terrified of the consequences of the arrest, the Count of Provence hastened to publicly disavow Favras, in a speech delivered before the Paris Commune, and in a letter to the National Constituent Assembly.

A fortnight after the arrest, Favras and his wife were separated, and Favras was removed to the Grand Châtelet. He was charged with the crime of lèse-nation. In the course of a trial that lasted nearly two months, witnesses disagreed about the facts concerning the case and evidence was lacking. Even Sylvain Maréchal, the anarchist editor of the republican newspaper Révolutions de Paris, admitted that the evidence against Favras was insufficient. However, an armed attempt to free him by some Royalists on 26 January, which was thwarted by La Fayette, aroused the suspicion of the Parisians, and on 18 February 1790, in spite of a notable defense plea, Favras was sentenced to be hanged.

After he had previously implicated others in the conspiracy—most notably the Count of Antraigues—Favras offered to give further information to the authorities on the plot's details and participants if reprieved but, denied that, refused to reveal more. His sentence was carried out in the Place de Grève the next day – a measure which was received with enthusiasm by members of the Parisian population, since it was the first instance when no distinction in the mode of execution was allowed between noble and commoner.

== Last words ==
Upon the reading of his death warrant, he supposedly remarked, "I see that you have made three spelling mistakes." However, this version appears to derive from a five-act play Marion de Lorme by Victor Hugo, written in 1828 and performed in 1831. Ferdinand Rothschild gives the quotation as "Permit me to point out that you have made three mistakes in spelling". One source says merely that "Favras then quietly corrects the spelling and punctuation errors made by the clerk in his statement".

== Legacy ==
Favras was generally regarded as a martyr to the Royalist cause for his refusal to implicate the Count of Provence, and Madame de Favras was given a pension by Louis XVI. She left France with her children. Her son Charles de Favras later served in the Habsburg and the Imperial Russian armies. Under the Bourbon Restoration, Charles received an allowance from Louis XVIII. Favras' daughter Karoline de Mahy (1787–1865) married in 1805, to Rudolf von Stillfried-Rattonitz (1764–1833).

The official dossier of Favras' trial for high treason against the nation disappeared from the Châtelet, but its substance was preserved in the papers of a clerk.
