= Lèse-nation =

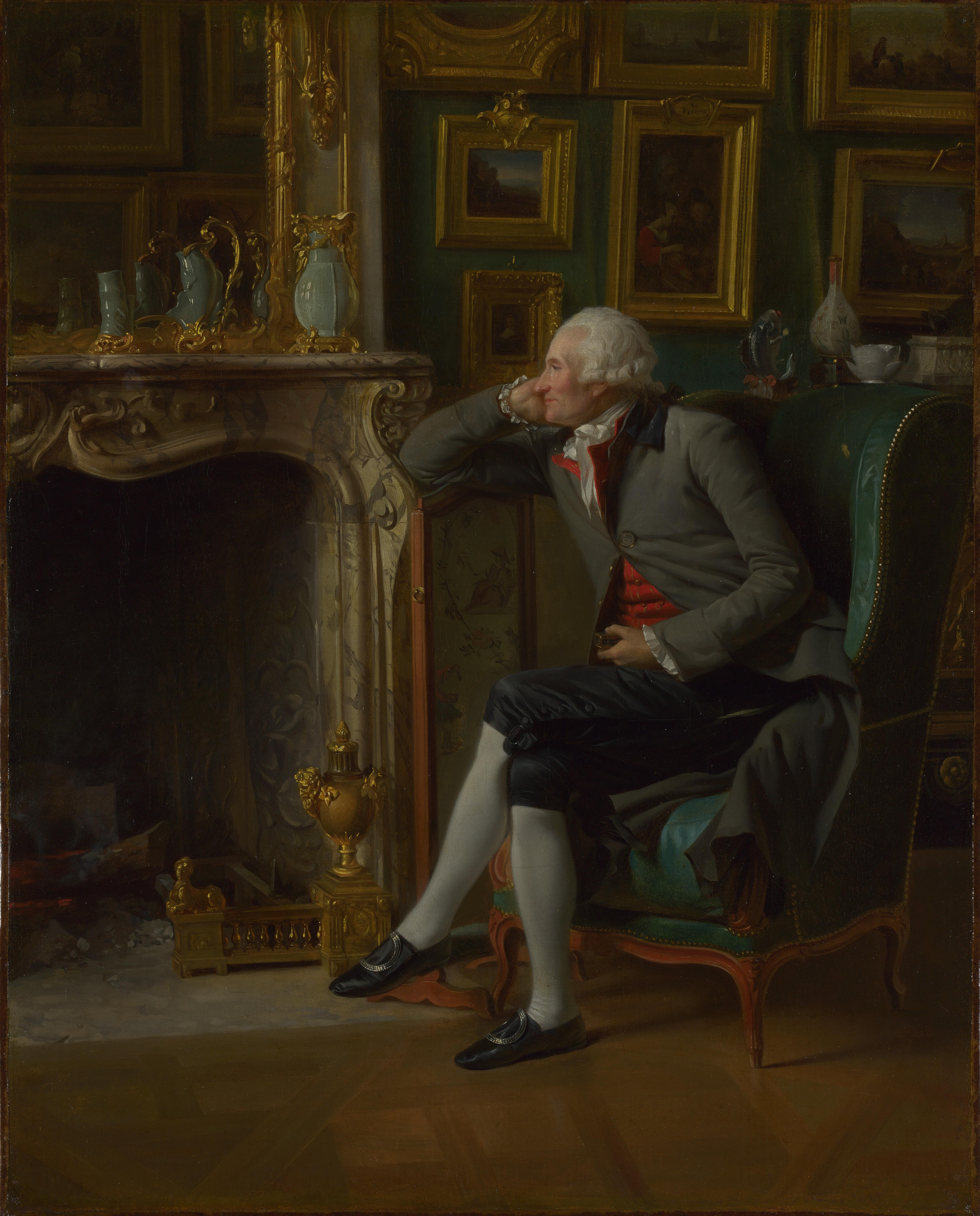
Le Baron de Besenval dans salon de compagnie at the Hôtel de Besenval, by Henri-Pierre Danloux (1791). The portrait shows the baron about one year after he was acquitted of the crime of lèse-nation, shortly before he died.

Lèse-nation, also lèze-nation, was a crime defined in France during the French Revolution. It referred to an offence or defamation against the dignity of the nation. Both the name and the corresponding law regarding the crime of lèse-nation trace back to the law concerning the crime of lèse-majesté. Both were adapted by the revolutionaries during the French Revolution so that the focus was no longer on the monarch, but on the nation. The English name for lèse-majesté is a modernised borrowing from the medieval French, where the term means a crime against The Crown. In classical Latin laesa māiestās means hurt or violated majesty. In the context of the term lèse-nation, it refers to a crime that harms the nation.

The law regarding the crime of lèse-nation was in force between 1789 and 1791. It was immediately after the proclamation of the sovereignty of the nation, in the aftermath of the Tennis Court Oath from 20 June 1789, that the foundation for this new law was laid. On 23 June 1789, the National Assembly announced that it will prosecute as criminals all those who, individuals or bodies, attack its existence or the freedom of its members.

Almost over night a new crime was invented. Or as Charles-Élie, Marquis de Ferrières, put it:

"We suddenly beheld a new crime, unknown to our fathers – the crime of lèse-nation."

— Charles-Élie, Marquis de Ferrières

The events surrounding the Storming of the Bastille on 14 July 1789 played an important role in the development and implementation of the law. Following the Bastille's fall, numerous denunciations and the specter of conspiracy compelled the National Assembly to address the issue of political offences. Quick action was required.

== Protection for the Revolution ==
The law regarding the crime of lèse-nation was introduced in the early days of the French Revolution. It came into force on 23 July 1789 by decree of the National Assembly. It defined intentions that harmed the nation and was modelled on the traditional crime of lèse-majesté, thereby illustrating the transfer of sovereignty. The law was introduced to protect the Revolution and its values and also served to define what constituted the nation. Taking into account the emerging regime's growing fears of counter-revolution, it became one of the most important legal measures at the beginning of the Revolution. In the long term, however, this was not the case. The weak judicial effectiveness of the law regarding the crime of lèse-nation contrasted with its political ambition. This explains its brief use. From 1791 onwards, the term crime contre la chose publique (crime against the common good) was preferred as the standard of political justice.

== What is a crime of lèse-nation? ==
A crime of lèse-nation is the deliberate disregard, in will and in deed, of the inviolable rights of the nation. Or in short, according to the revolutionaries: The criminals guilty of the crime of lèse-nation are those who want to maintain the old despotism and aristocracy. Maximilien Robespierre reminded his fellow revolutionaries in a speech on 25 October 1790 when it came to introducing new laws and establishing the judiciary for the young nation: "The tribunal which you have formed must be endowed with courage and sufficient arms, for it is to contend with the mighty, who are the declared enemies of the people."

=== Physical or moral attack against the nation ===
Crimes of lèse-nation were defined as attacks committed directly against the rights of society. There are two types: those who attack the physical existence of the nation and those who seek to harm its moral existence. The latter are as guilty as the former. Crimes of lèse-nation are rare in states where a strong constitution and an established government enable the enforcement of the state's monopoly on the use of force. At this point, however, the young nation was still in the process of forming. Under the Constitution of 1791, the crime was to be judged by the Haute Cour Nationale.

== The who's who of the Ancien Régime in the dock ==
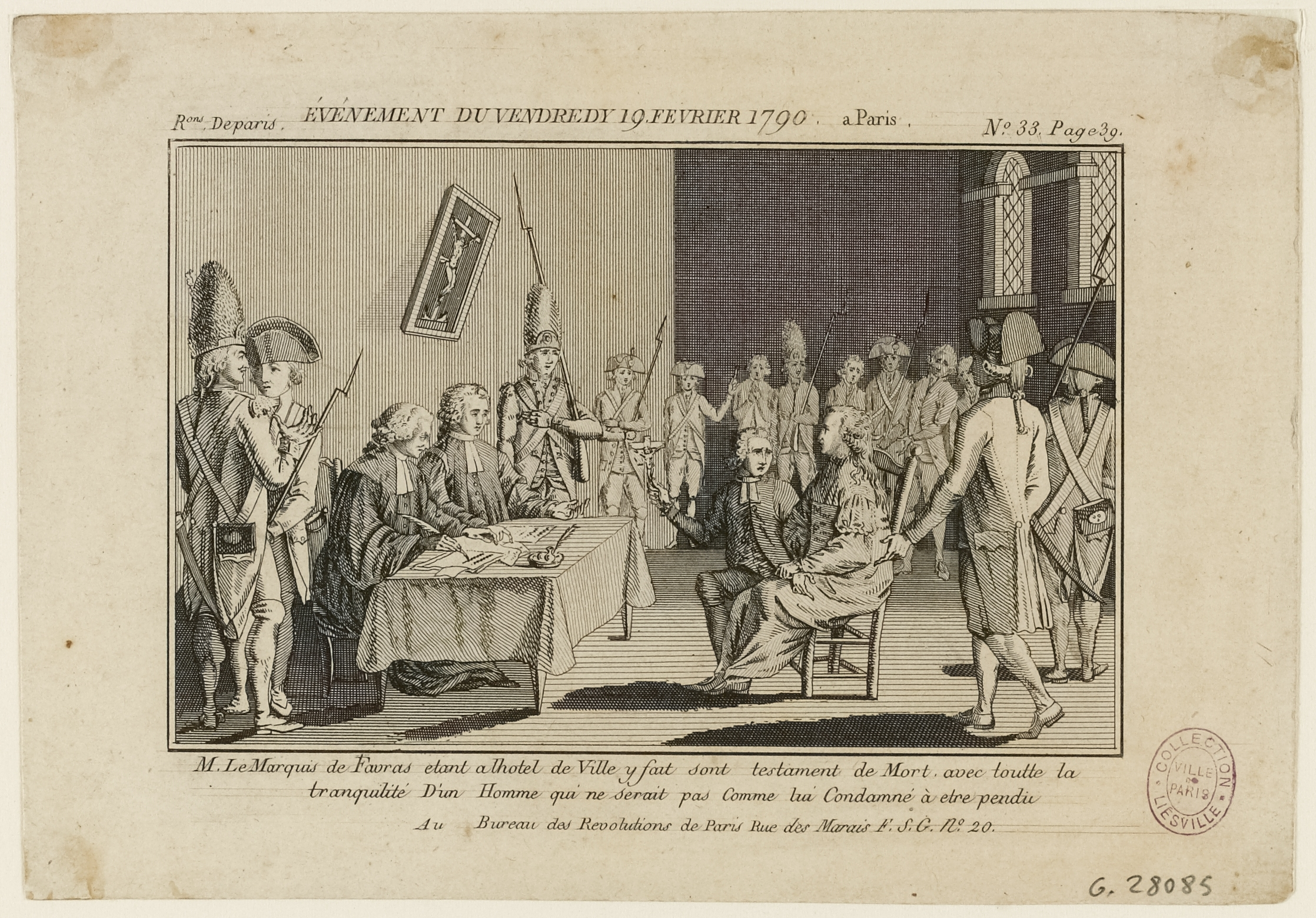
Thomas de Mahy, Marquis de Favras, on 19 February 1790, writing his will a few hours before his execution.

The most prominent personalities who were accused of the crime of lèse-nation were: Charles-Eugène de Lorraine, Prince de Lambesc; Charles Marie Auguste Joseph de Beaumont, Comte d'Autichamp; Victor François, Duc de Broglie; Charles Louis François de Paule de Barentin, Seigneur d'Hardivilliers and Louis Pierre de Chastenet de Puységur, Comte de Puységur.

=== The only death sentence ===
The only death sentence passed under the law of lèse-nation was that of Thomas de Mahy, Marquis de Favras. The Marquis de Favras was sentenced to death on 18 February 1790. He was hanged the next day on the Place de Grève in Paris. The execution of this judgement was seen by the revolutionaries as the first experience of political justice of the French Revolution.

=== A Swiss baron in the dock: Complot contre Paris et l'Assamblée Nationale ===
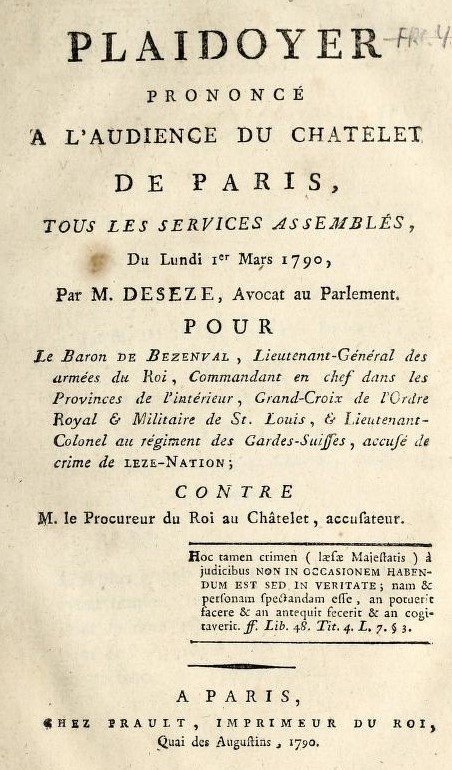
The frontispiece of the plaidoyer in the Affaire de M. le Baron de Besenval, by Raymond Desèze, lawyer of Pierre Victor, Baron de Besenval.

However, the most famous person accused of the crime of lèse-nation was Pierre Victor, Baron de Besenval de Brunstatt, a Swiss military officer in French service. The judicial proceedings against him in connection with the Storming of the Bastille began on 20 November 1789, when the record of the dénonciation and the complaint of the King's Prosecutor were read aloud before the court at the Grand Châtelet in Paris, in accordance with the decree of the Municipal Committee of Inquiry of 18 November, which summarised the charges against him. His trial proper began the following day, on 21 November 1789, with the first judicial questioning. In the court records, the Besenval Case is referred to as: Affaire du Baron de Besenval: Complot contre Paris et l'Assamblée Nationale, 19 novembre 1789 – 1 mars 1790. The baron's case became exemplary. Not only because he was a foreigner, a close friend of Queen Marie Antoinette and one of the first accused of the crime of lèse-nation, but also because of his fame and his famous friends who campaigned for his release, such as the Marquis de Lafayette, Jacques Necker and the Comte de Mirabeau. What was ultimately important for the baron's survival: These gentlemen also enjoyed respect among the revolutionaries. Furthermore, the baron was represented in court by the best and most prominent French lawyer at the time: Raymond Desèze. He later also defended King Louis XVI in court. The court was deeply impressed by Desèze's plaidoyer. The plaidoyer was even published and was considered a reference in court cases regarding the crime of lèse-nation.

In addition, as early as October 1789, the report of the Commission of Inquiry revealed that the only document currently in existence that could convict the Baron de Besenval of a crime of lèse-nation is a copy of an order written to the Governor of the Bastille, Bernard-René Jourdan, Marquis de Launay, in which the baron wrote: "Monsieur de Launay will hold out to the last extremity; I have dispatched to him forces sufficient." The original of this document no longer existed and the copy was not sufficient for a conviction in court, at least that's what was officially claimed.

"The Baron de Besenval replied in court, with seeming confidence, that he had penned no letters to M. de Launay."

— Louis-Marie Prudhomme, his court report in his newspaper Révolutions de Paris on the trial day of 3 December 1789 in the Besenval Case. However, this was obviously fake news as documented by court records and shows the partly incorrect reporting and the partly deliberately defamatory false reports to the detriment of the Baron de Besenval in this controversial court case

==== The rescue of the Baron de Besenval ====
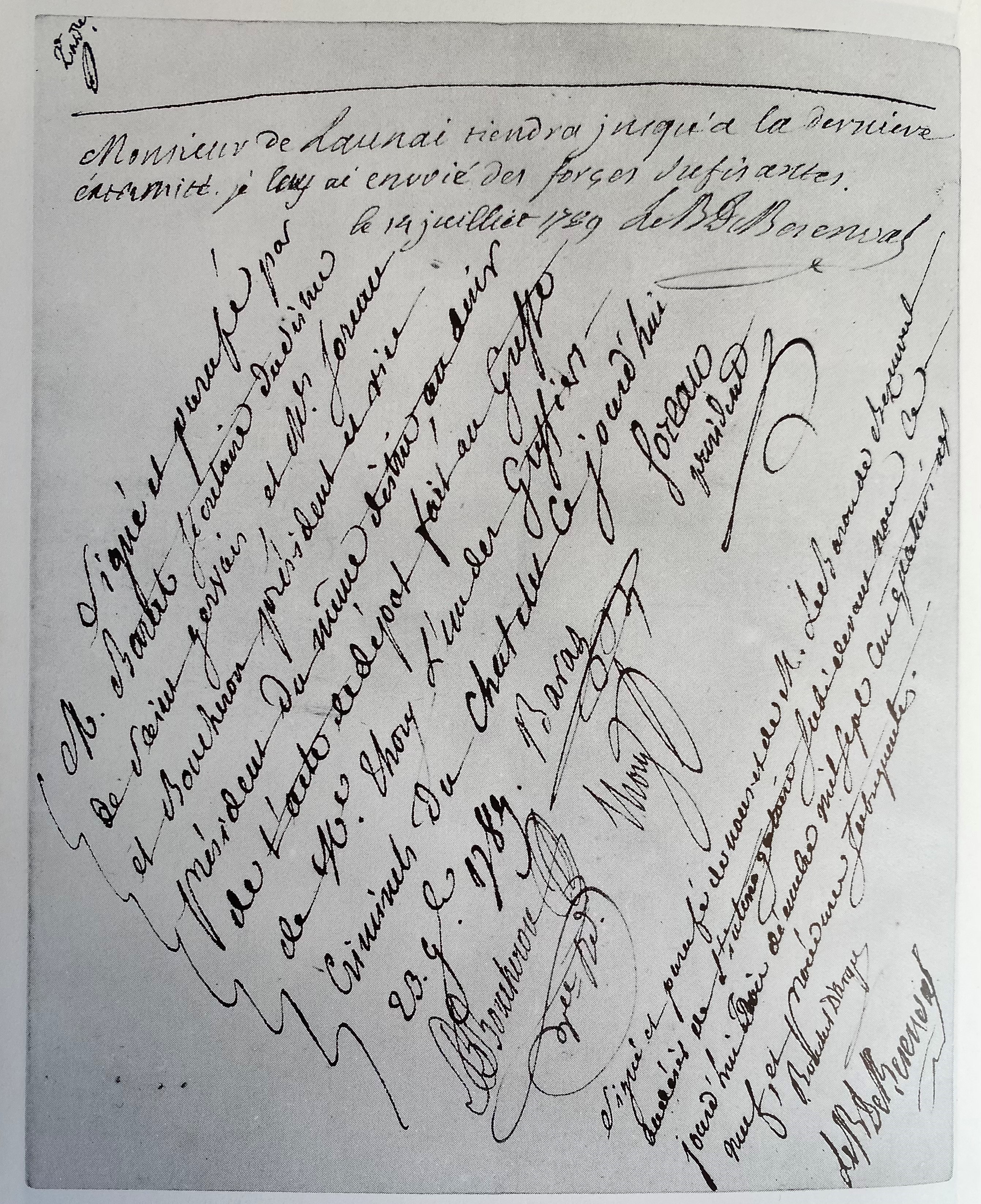
One of the most important court documents in the Besenval Case: The short order written by the Baron de Besenval to the Governor of the Bastille, Bernard-René Jourdan, Marquis de Launay. It says (old French): "Monsieur de Launai tiendra jusqu'à la dernière extrémité; je luy ai envoié des forces sufisantes." Le 14 juillet 1789 le B. de Besenval (Monsieur de Launai will hold out to the last extremity; I have dispatched to him forces sufficient). As the baron's trial progressed, various comments and signatures from people involved in the trial were added to the note, including the baron's confirmation of authenticity on 3 December 1789 (signature at the bottom). The date is written out (French): Aujourd'hui, trois décembre mille-sept-cent-quatre-vingt-neuf.

Of course, there were also doubts about this official theory that the document was just a copy or a fake. After all, the document was dated and signed le 14 juillet 1789, le B. de Besenval. Critics of the Baron de Besenval saw this as an attempt by the baron's influential friends to save his neck. Later the defense strategy was changed. And on 3 December 1789, Pierre Victor de Besenval acknowledged before the court that the document was genuine, thereby confirming the authenticity of his written order to the Governor of the Bastille. However, circumstances had obviously changed in the meantime and this document alone was no longer enough to convict the baron.

"He [Pierre Victor, Baron de Besenval], confessed that he had recommended to the Sieur de Launay [Bernard-René Jourdan, Marquis de Launay], Governor of the Bastille, that he should maintain the place to the last extremity; but observed, at the same time, that such was the duty of an officer entrusted with the guard of a fortress."

— Pierre Victor, Baron de Besenval, reported statement before the court during the proceedings against him. On 3 December 1789, Pierre Victor de Besenval formally confirmed the authenticity of the written order by affixing his signature

The trial against the Baron de Besenval was highly political and controversial. There were many rumours, intrigues and false reports surrounding the trial, to the detriment of the baron. A fictitious correspondence between the Baron de Besenval and the Marquis de Favras was even published in order to stir up sentiment against the baron. Accordingly, public opinion was largely against him. The people thirsted for revenge, whereby the people had less of an eye on individual personalities than on the nobility as a whole. A scapegoat was needed. Consequently, it is very likely that the court wanted to make an example regarding the crime of lèse-nation. Hence it was probably to the baron's advantage that the example demanded by the people was already made on the Marquis de Favras on 18 February 1790 and the people were therefore already satisfied when the baron's trial ended on 1 March 1790. Although most of the public still believed that the Baron de Besenval was guilty, calls for his execution diminished significantly after the execution of the Marquis de Favras on 19 February 1790. There was even the rumor that it was precisely for this reason that the end of the trial of the Baron de Besenval was postponed to a date after the execution of the Marquis de Favras.

"Favras fell a victim to Besenval."

— Comment by Jean-Charles Thilorier, legal advisor of Thomas de Mahy, Marquis de Favras. At the end of January 1790, it became clear to Jean-Charles Thilorier that the court wanted to link the two lèse-nation cases in the sense that Favras should be sacrificed in favour of Besenval

On Monday, 1 March 1790, the Baron de Besenval was acquitted of the crime of lèse-nation. A verdict that was not without controversy. Quite a few regarded this judgement as a courtesy decision in favour of the baron's influential friends.

"Monsieur Necker saved my life. (...) I swear loyalty and gratitude to him unto my dying day."

— Pierre Victor, Baron de Besenval, in conversation with his friends when he was back at his residence, the Hôtel de Besenval

== Gallery: Selected newspaper articles about the trial against Pierre Victor de Besenval ==
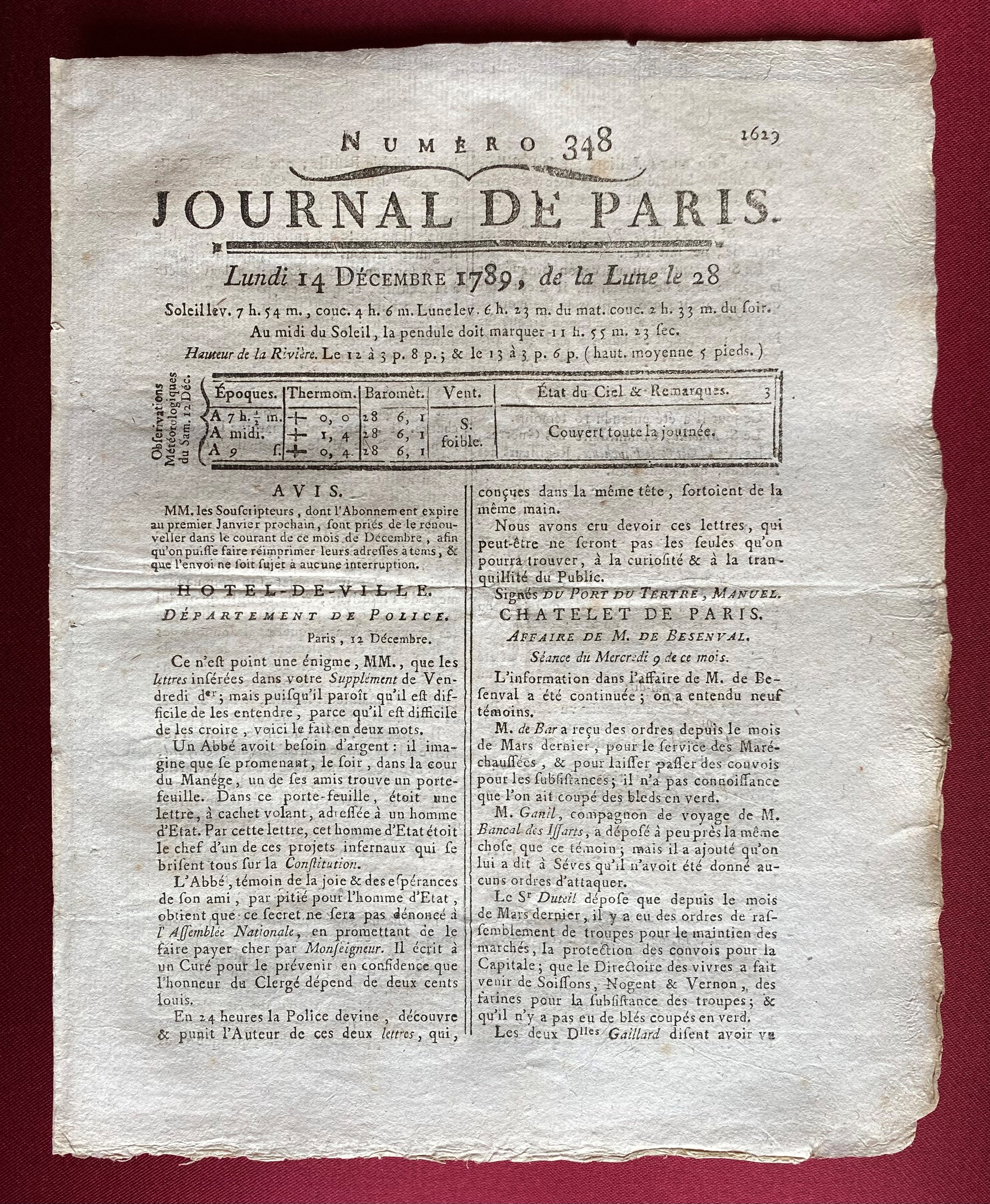
During his trial, the Baron de Besenval made headlines for months in the Journal de Paris and other newspapers. The trial against him was highly political and controversial. But the baron still had influential friends on both sides, the nobility and the revolutionaries

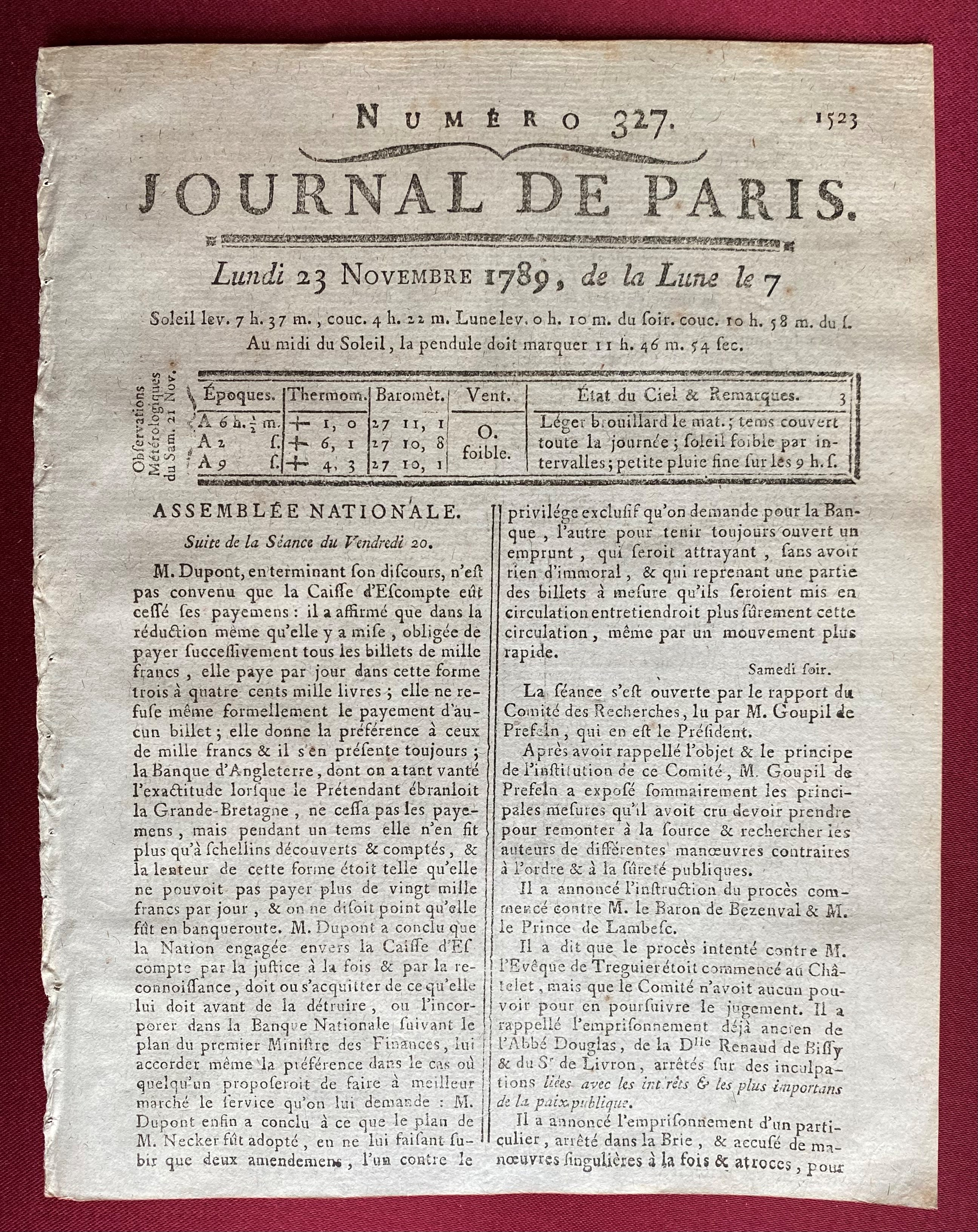
Report on the opening of the trial against the Baron de Besenval on Saturday, 21 November 1789 at the Grand Châtelet in Paris

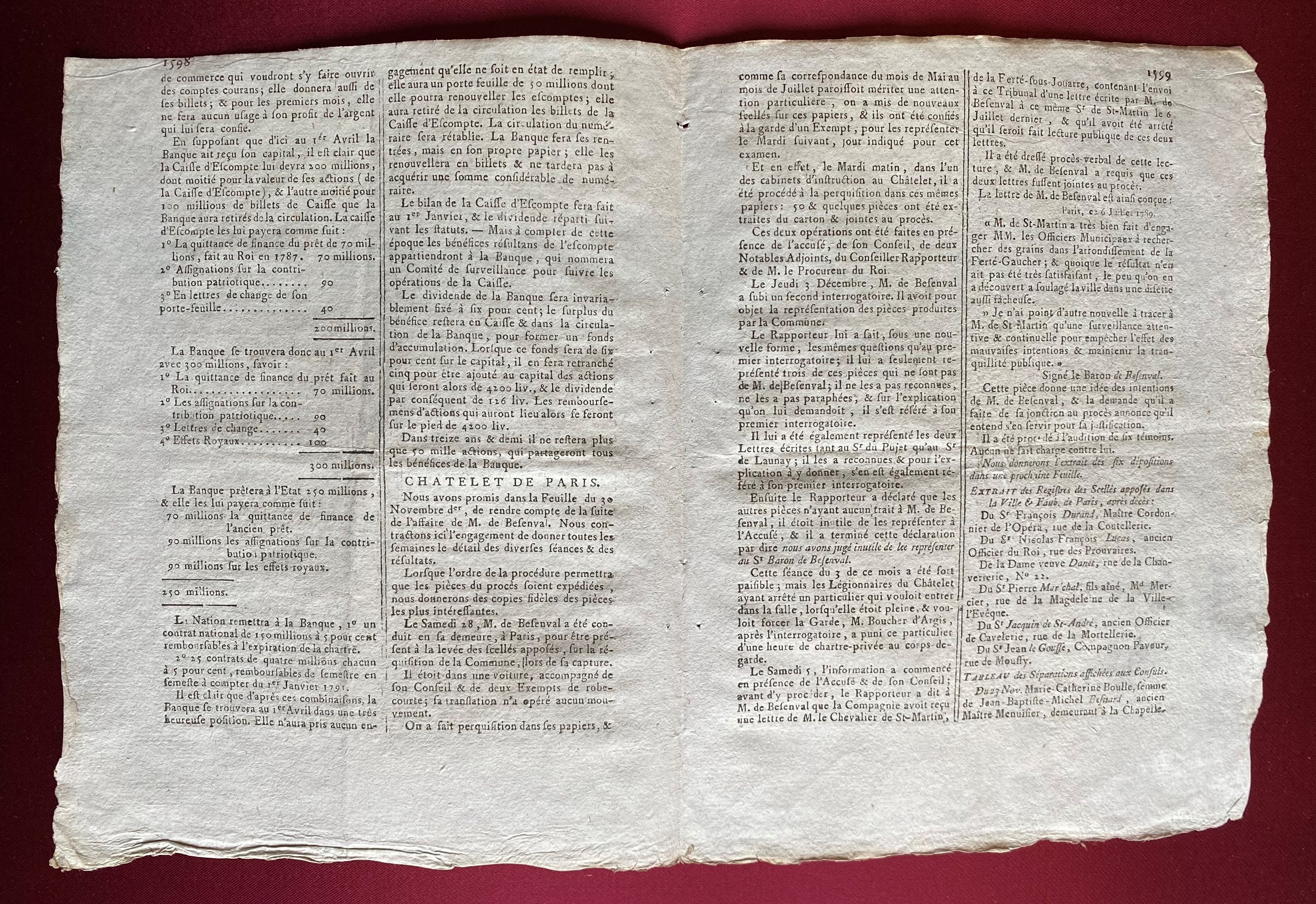
Excerpt from the Journal de Paris, no. 341, Monday, 7 December 1789, Châtelet de Paris: Report focusing on the second interrogation of the Baron de Besenval on 3 December, where he acknowledged his written order to the Marquis de Launay

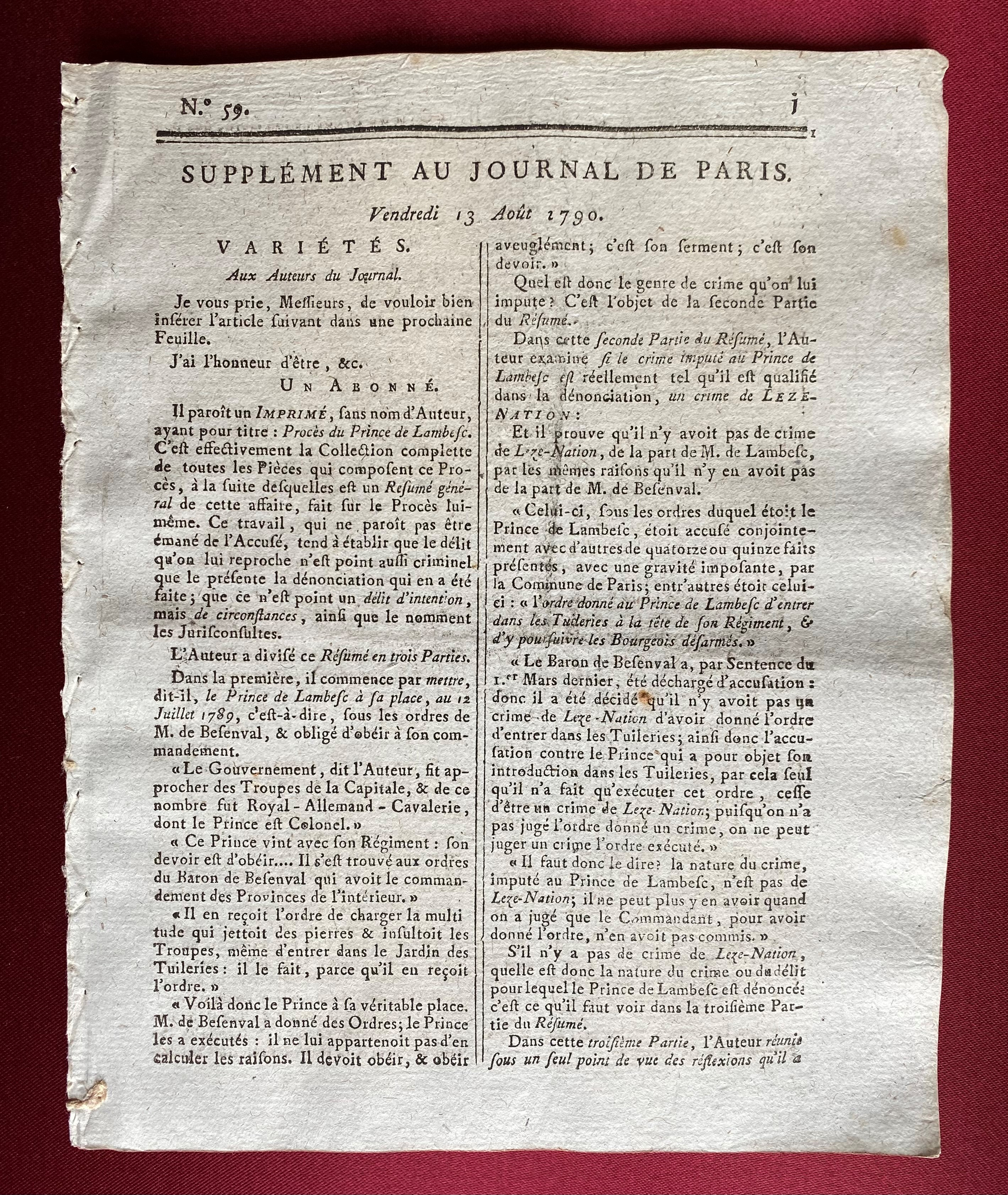
Excerpt from the Journal de Paris, no. 225, Friday, 13 August 1790: Acquittal of the Baron de Besenval from the accusation of the crime of lèse-nation on 1 March 1790

== See also ==
- Hurting the feelings of the Chinese people
- Insulting Turkishness
