= Pierre Victor, baron de Besenval de Brünstatt =

Swiss military officer in French service

Pierre Victor de Besenval de Brunstatt
- Baron de Besenval de Brunstatt
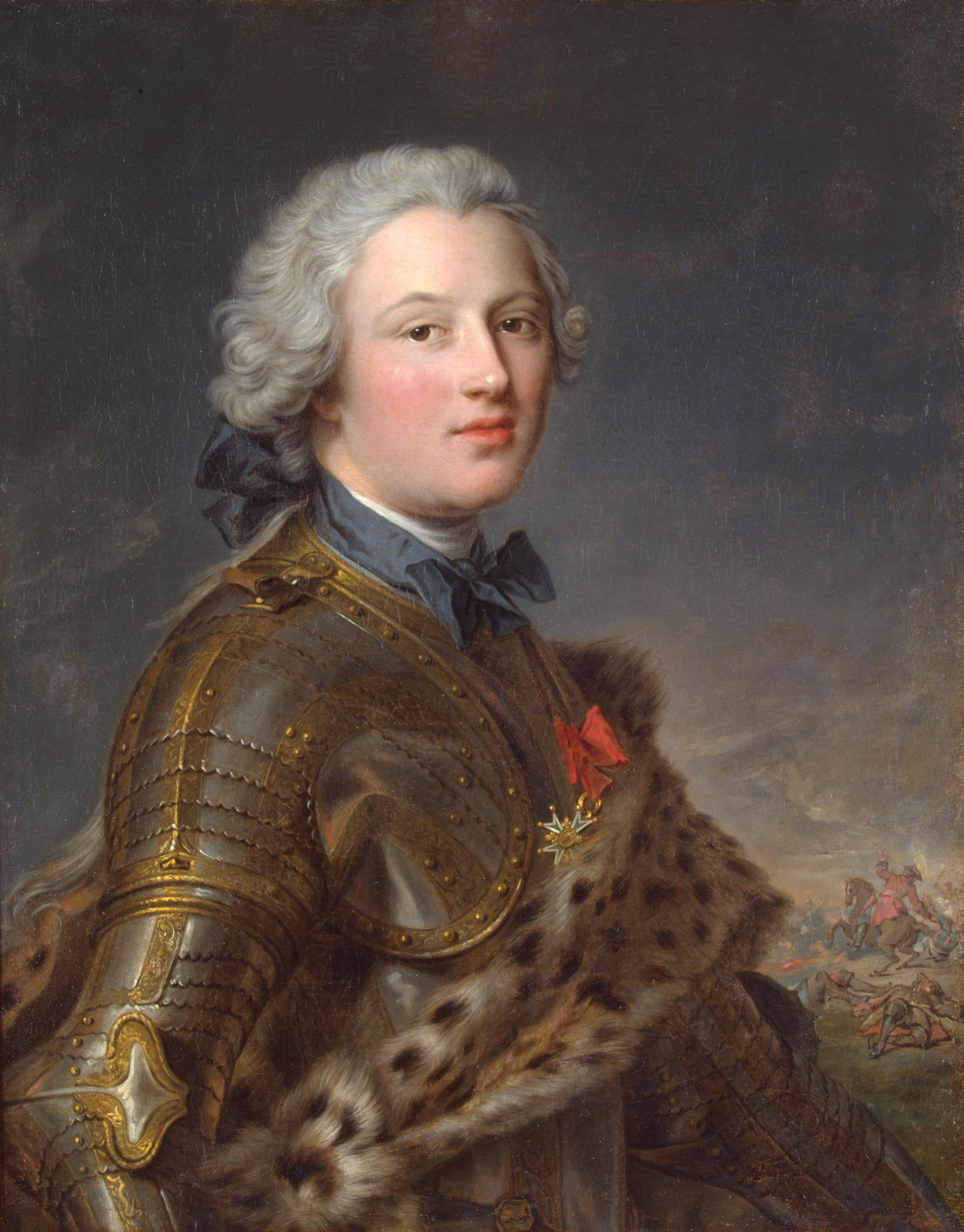
- Portrait by Jean-Marc Nattier, 1766
- Born: 14 October 1721; Schloss Waldegg, Switzerland
- Died: 2 June 1791 (aged 69); Hôtel de Besenval, France
- Noble family: House of Besenval
- Issue: Joseph-Alexandre Pierre, Vicomte de Ségur (illegitimate)
- Father: Jean Victor, Baron de Besenval de Brunstatt
- Mother: Katarzyna, Baronne de Besenval de Brunstatt, née Bielińska (1684–1761)

Pierre Victor, baron de Besenval de Brunstatt (Note: Bezenval, Bésenval or Beuzeval and Bronstatt, Brünstatt or Brunnstatt) (born Peter Joseph Viktor von Besenval von Brunstatt; 14 October 1721 – 2 June 1791) was a Swiss military officer in French service. He was usually just referred to as Baron de Besenval (the suffix Brunstatt refers to the former barony). Over time and depending on the language, the family name was adapted according to the international careers and marriages of the family members and the different spellings were adopted by chroniclers, historians and journalists.

Pierre Victor de Besenval was the most famous person accused of the crime of lèse-nation during the French Revolution. The baron's case became exemplary. Not only because he was a foreigner, a close friend of Queen Marie Antoinette and one of the first accused of the crime of lèse-nation, but also because of his fame and his famous friends who campaigned for his release.

== Biography ==
=== Family and relatives ===
Pierre Victor de Besenval was born near Solothurn, Switzerland, to Jean Victor, Baron de Besenval de Brunstatt and Katarzyna, Baronne de Besenval de Brunstatt, née Bielińska (1684–1761), at the family's country estate, Schloss Waldegg. His father was a colonel of the Regiment of Swiss Guards in the pay of France. Through his mother, Pierre Victor de Besenval was the grandson of the Polish politician Kazimierz Ludwik Bieliński. In 1726, when he was five years old, his mother brought him to France, where his parents already lived.

Théodora Élisabeth Catherine, Marquise de Broglie, née de Besenval de Brunstatt (1718–1777), was Pierre Victor de Besenval's sister. His maternal aunt was the diplomatically influential Marianna Denhoff, also known as Maria Magdalena, Gräfin von Dönhoff, née Bielińska.

==== Accumulation of power: A state affair in Solothurn ====
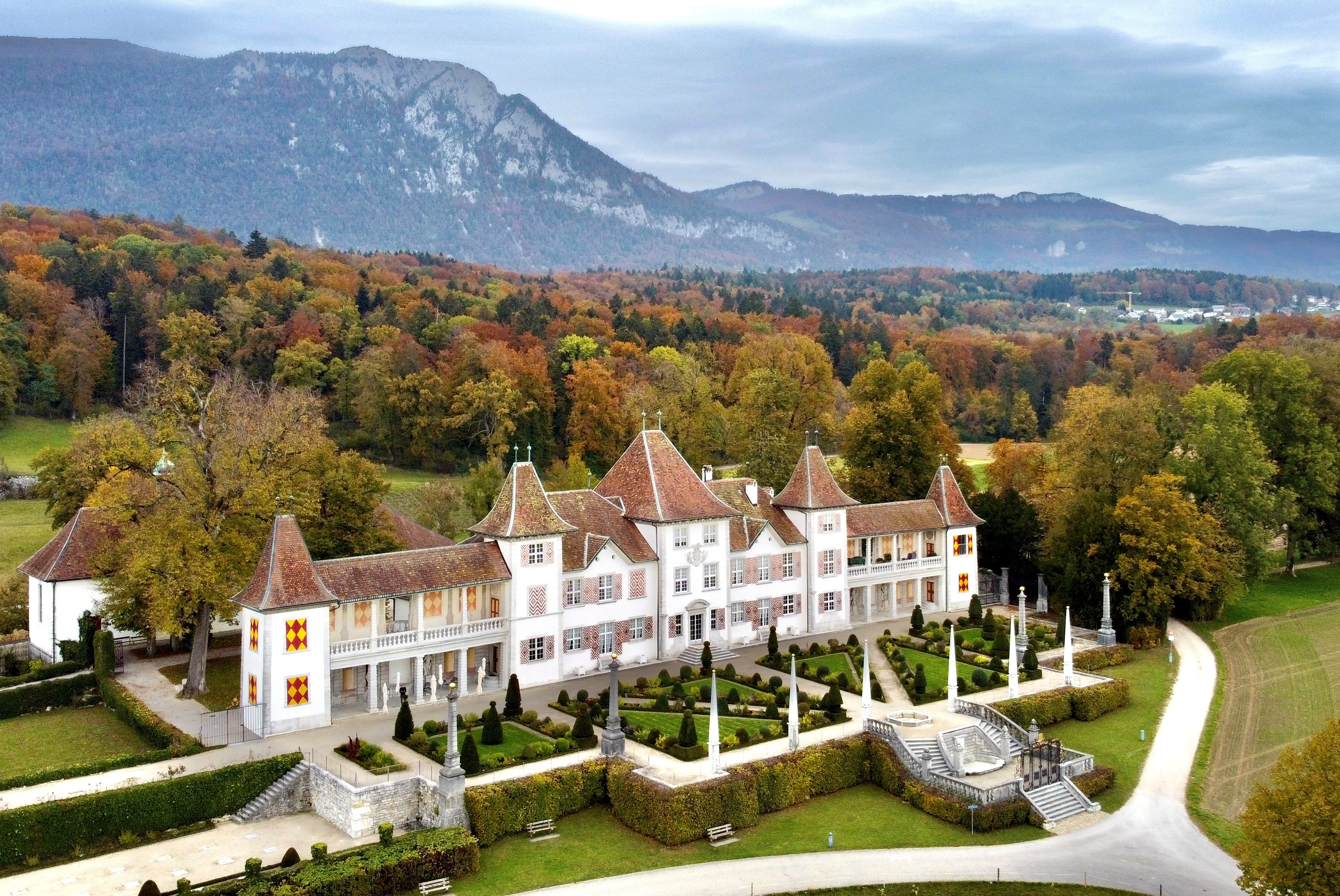
Pierre Victor de Besenval's country estate near Solothurn, the Schloss Waldegg, where he was born.

Although Pierre Victor de Besenval spent the vast majority of his life in Paris, he still represented his family in the political bodies of the city of Solothurn, partially represented by his cousins during his absence.

The family de Besenval was extremely powerful due to their wealth. Between 1707 and 1723, the family ruled the city of Solothurn almost single-handedly. The family's wealth came primarily from the salt trade and the mercenary business with France. The family's concentration of power was therefore viewed with mixed feelings in Solothurn. And when, in 1763, it was proposed that Pierre Victor de Besenval, who had held a seat in the Grand Council (parliament) since 1743, should be made a Conseiller Honoraire in recognition of his services to the reform of the army, this caused a state affair, whereupon Pierre Victor de Besenval was expelled from the Grand Council between 1764 and 1769.

=== A model military career of a Swiss patrician in French service ===
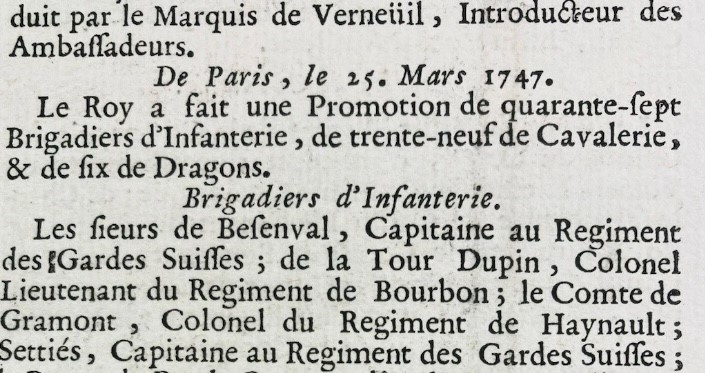
La Gazette de France (excerpt): The announcement of the appointment of Pierre Victor de Besenval as brigadier by King Louis XV on 25 March 1747.

In 1731, Pierre Victor de Besenval joined the Swiss Guards as a cadet. He was promoted to ensign in 1733 and became the commander of the regiment's Company de Besenval in 1738. In the French army, he was promoted to brigadier in 1747, maréchal de camp in 1758 and lieutenant-général in 1762. In the same year he was appointed Inspecteur Général of the Swiss Guards and the Grisons Troops in French service. The young baron served at first as aide-de-camp to Victor-François de Broglie during the campaign of 1748 in Bohemia, then as aide-de-camp to the Duc d'Orléans during the Seven Years' War.

Pierre Victor de Besenval was not only friends with the family of the Maréchal Victor-François, Duc de Broglie, but also related to them through his sister's husband, Charles Guillaume Louis, Marquis de Broglie (1716–1786).

In the early 1760s, the Baron de Besenval played a key role in the Duc de Choiseul's reform of the army. After being appointed military governor of Haguenau in 1766, he was made Lieutenant-Colonel of the Swiss Guards in 1767. Furthermore, in 1781, he was promoted to Commandant en chef of the troops and garrisons in the interior of France.

=== The queen's favourite, Swiss diplomat and the purchase of the Hôtel de Besenval ===
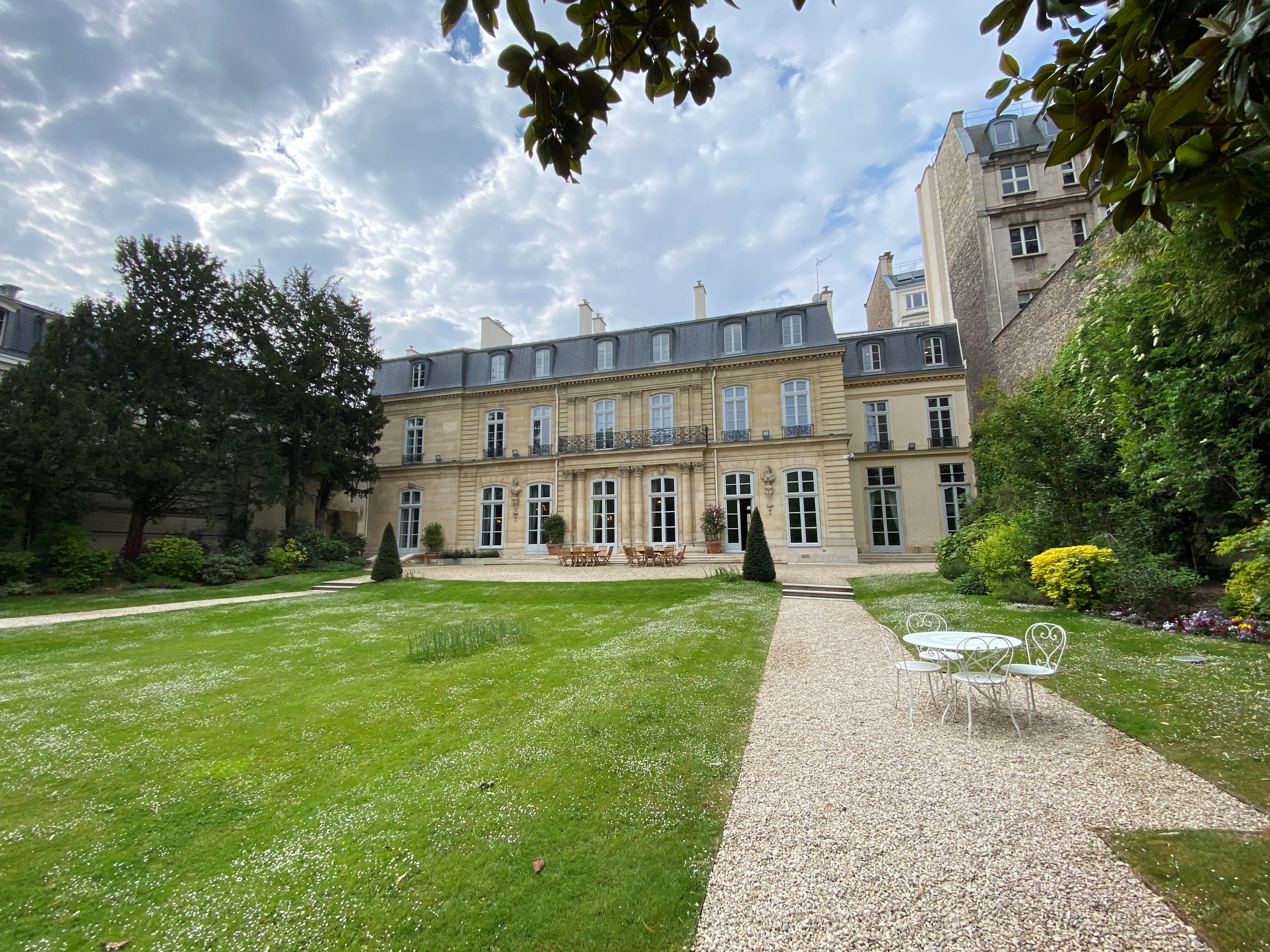
The Hôtel de Besenval, which Pierre Victor de Besenval acquired in 1767.

After the accession of King Louis XVI in 1774, Pierre Victor de Besenval became a favourite of Queen Marie Antoinette, whom he assisted on various occasions with advice and assistance, such as in the affair: An Incident at the Opera Ball on Mardi Gras in 1778.

==== In the service of the Swiss Confederation ====
At that time, the Baron de Besenval was at the height of his power at the royal court. He was the most influential Swiss ever to have served at the French court. Switzerland, at the time the Confederation of the XIII cantons, capitalised on this influence, using the popular baron as its ambassador to the royal court.

==== Hôtel de Besenval ====
It was on 5 December 1767, that Pierre Victor de Besenval bought his Parisian residence, the Hôtel Chanac de Pompadour, thereafter renamed Hôtel de Besenval, and where he kept one of the most famous paintings of its time: La Gimblette by Jean-Honoré Fragonard. The Hôtel de Besenval has housed the Embassy of the Swiss Confederation and the residence of the Swiss ambassador to France since 1938.

=== French Revolution, family and last years ===
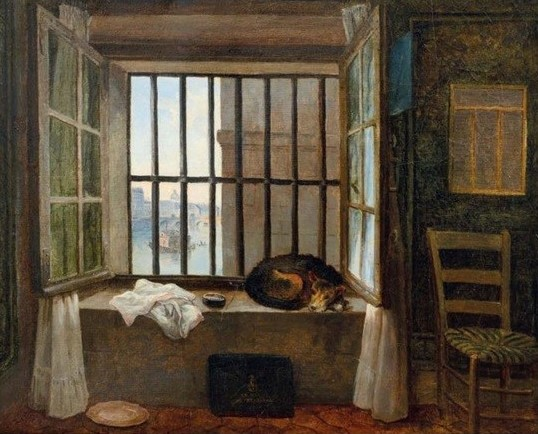
Vue de la cellule du Baron de Besenval à la prison du Châtelet, painted by Hubert Robert during the imprisonment of Pierre Victor de Besenval in the Grand Châtelet in 1789. The inscription on the briefcase under the window reads Le Baron de Bezenval. The painting was later owned by the baron's son Joseph-Alexandre Pierre, Vicomte de Ségur, before being purchased for the Louvre in 2012.

As the uprisings in and around Paris intensified in the summer of 1789, the Baron de Besenval remained firmly attached to the royal court and was given command of the troops which the king had concentrated in Paris to suppress the riots which had been going on for some time. The riots culminated in the Storming of the Bastille on 14 July 1789. In the eyes of contemporaries, the Baron de Besenval acted unluckily in the crisis. The aristocracy described the baron's actions as disastrous and decisive for the further course of events, which ultimately led to the French Revolution. When the revolutionary masses demanded his head after the Taking of the Bastille, Pierre Victor de Besenval tried to escape to his home country, Switzerland.

==== Distrusted by the people – valued by kings and queens ====
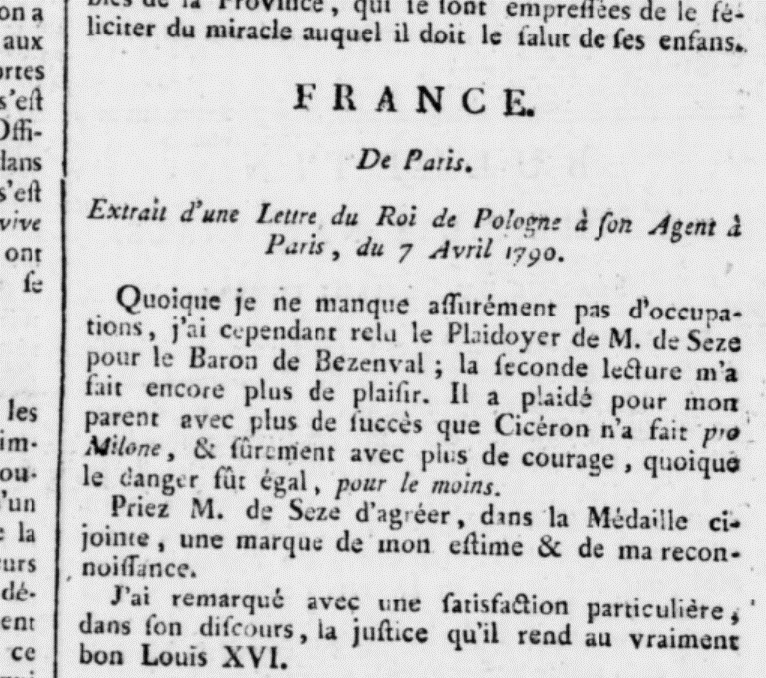
Excerpt from the letter of the King of Poland, published in the Moniteur Universel on 16 May 1790, congratulating Raymond Desèze on his victory.

On 26 July 1789, Pierre Victor de Besenval was arrested while fleeing to Switzerland. On 7 November 1789, he was imprisoned in the Grand Châtelet before being accused by the tribunal of the Grand Châtelet of the crime of lèse-nation. His trial in connection with the Storming of the Bastille began on 21 November with the first judicial questioning. The prison cell of Pierre Victor de Besenval was depicted by Hubert Robert in his painting from 1789 Vue de la cellule du Baron de Besenval à la prison du Châtelet (View from the Baron de Besenval's cell in the Châtelet prison).

On 1 March 1790, Pierre Victor de Besenval was acquitted of all charges. This was due in no small part to the fact that his compatriot Jacques Necker – the Genevan banker and French Finance Minister, who was especially popular among the common people – kept his protective hand over him. Necker's popularity among ordinary Frenchmen stood in sharp contrast to the hostility he often encountered at court, where many aristocrats looked down on the Swiss-born commoner and reformer. Following the acquittal, King Louis XVI and Queen Marie Antoinette had publicly expressed their joy that the baron had been acquitted of all charges.

Another king, King Stanisław II August of Poland, with whom the Baron de Besenval was related on his mother's side, was also pleased by the acquittal. In a letter dated 7 April 1790, the king instructed his envoy in Paris to congratulate the baron's lawyer, Raymond Desèze, on his victory and had the envoy present him with a medal as a token of thanks. The letter of the King of Poland was published in the Moniteur Universel on 16 May 1790.

The King of Poland wrote in his letter: "Though I am by no means without occupations, I have nevertheless reread Monsieur Desèze's plaidoyer for the Baron de Besenval. The second reading afforded me yet greater pleasure. He pleaded for my relative with greater success than Cicero in his defence of Milo, and certainly with more courage, although the danger was at least equal. Pray, ask Monsieur Desèze to accept, with the enclosed medal, a token of my esteem and gratitude. I note with especial satisfaction in his speech the justice he does to the truly good Louis XVI."

==== An illegitimate heir for his treasure house in Paris ====
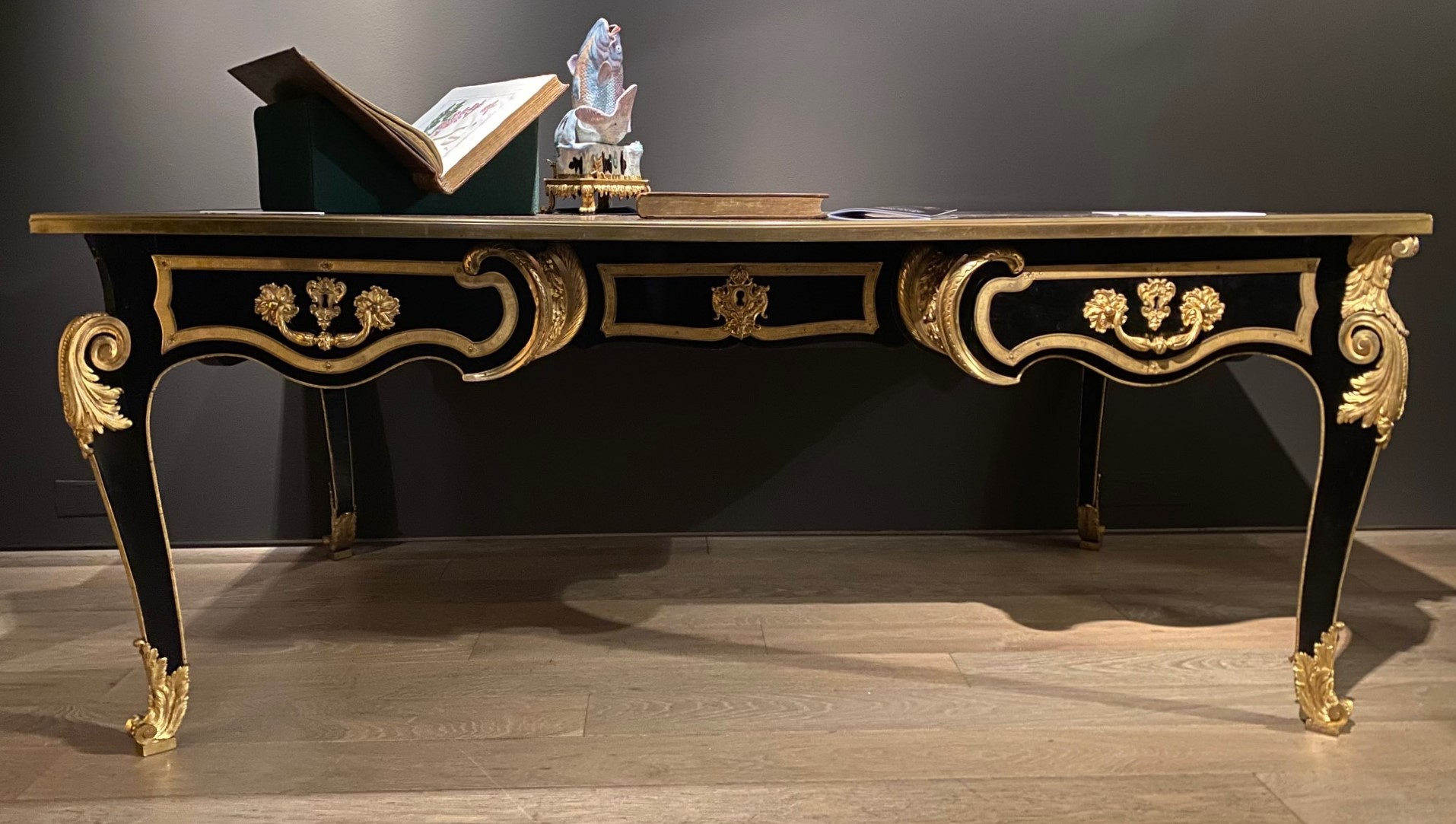
The Baron de Besenval's bureau plat from around 1720 and remodelled by the ebeniste E. J. Cuvellier around 1765, so that the bureau plat matches the cartonnier (filing cabinet), which was manufactured by Bernard III van Risenburgh about that time. Pierre Victor de Besenval probably inherited the bureau plat from his father. The bureau plat and the cartonnier were once in the possession of Gustave Samuel James, Baron de Rothschild, at the Hôtel de Marigny. The bureau plat is shown here at the Christie's sales exhibition in Paris in 2025. The bureau plat and the cartonnier were previously sold by Christie's in London in 2021 for EUR 462,500.

Pierre Victor de Besenval was considered a womaniser. Accordingly, he had several affairs. The mother of his son, Joseph-Alexandre Pierre, Vicomte de Ségur, was Louise-Anne-Madeleine, Marquise de Ségur, née de Vernon (1729–1778), the wife of his best friend Philippe Henri, Marquis de Ségur. However, this was no secret within the family. And this fact in no way clouded the relationship between all those involved. Quite the contrary. Pierre Victor de Besenval and the members of the family de Ségur enjoyed being together. The baron spent a lot of time at the château of the Marquis de Ségur in Romainville. They saw themselves as one big family. That may also have been the reason why the baron never married.

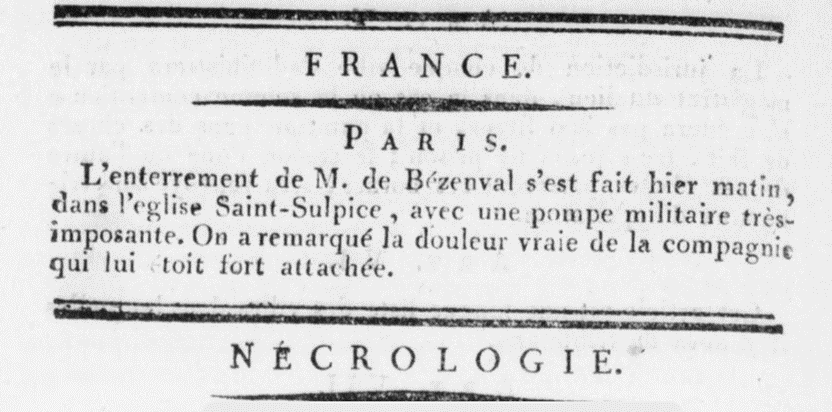
Funeral notice of Pierre Victor, Baron de Besenval, on 7 June 1791, followed by a two-page obituary by his son Joseph-Alexandre Pierre, Vicomte de Ségur, in the monarchist newspaper Feuille du Jour, of which the Vicomte de Ségur was co-editor. The funeral took place on 6 June in the church of Saint-Sulpice in Paris.

Pierre Victor de Besenval died in Paris on 2 June 1791 in his residence, the Hôtel de Besenval, which he bequeathed to his only child, Joseph-Alexandre Pierre de Ségur. However, more precisely, the baron's son only inherited the bare ownership of the residence on the Rue de Grenelle, as well as some other personal possessions. The baron bequeathed the usufruct of the Hôtel de Besenval to his lifelong friend Maréchal Philippe Henri, Marquis de Ségur, Baron de Romainville, Seigneur de Ponchapt et de Fougueyrolles, who was the legal father of Joseph-Alexandre Pierre, Vicomte de Ségur. Furthermore, Joseph-Alexandre Pierre de Ségur was not the heir to the baron's country estate in Switzerland, the Schloss Waldegg. The estate was passed down within the family de Besenval.

"He looked like a mere shadow. His sunken, still beautiful face was deathly pale, and his eyes stared unseeing. An hour later, he lay dead in my arms."

— Victor von Gibelin, on the appearance of Pierre Victor de Besenval in the dining room of the Hôtel de Besenval on the evening of 2 June 1791. An hour later, the baron died in his arms

== Remembered by the personalities of his time ==
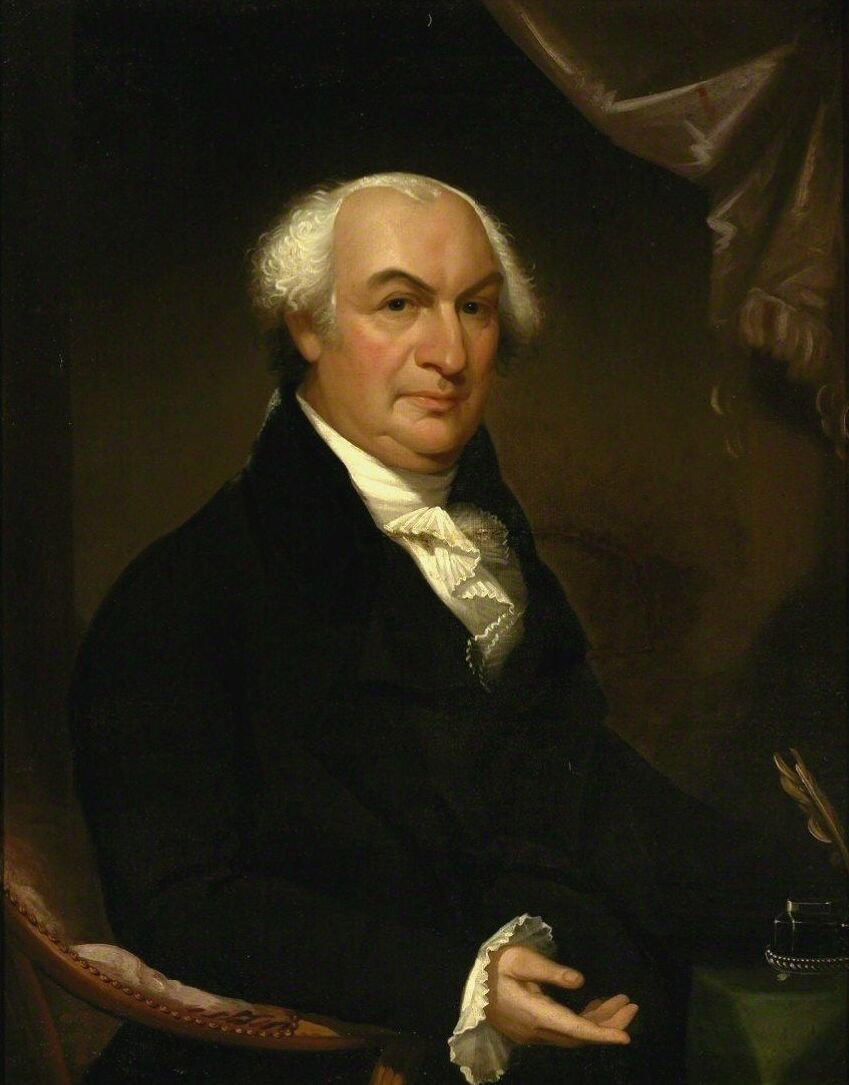
Gouverneur Morris, a loyal friend of Pierre Victor de Besenval, who visited him several times in prison when the baron was accused of the crime of lèse-nation.

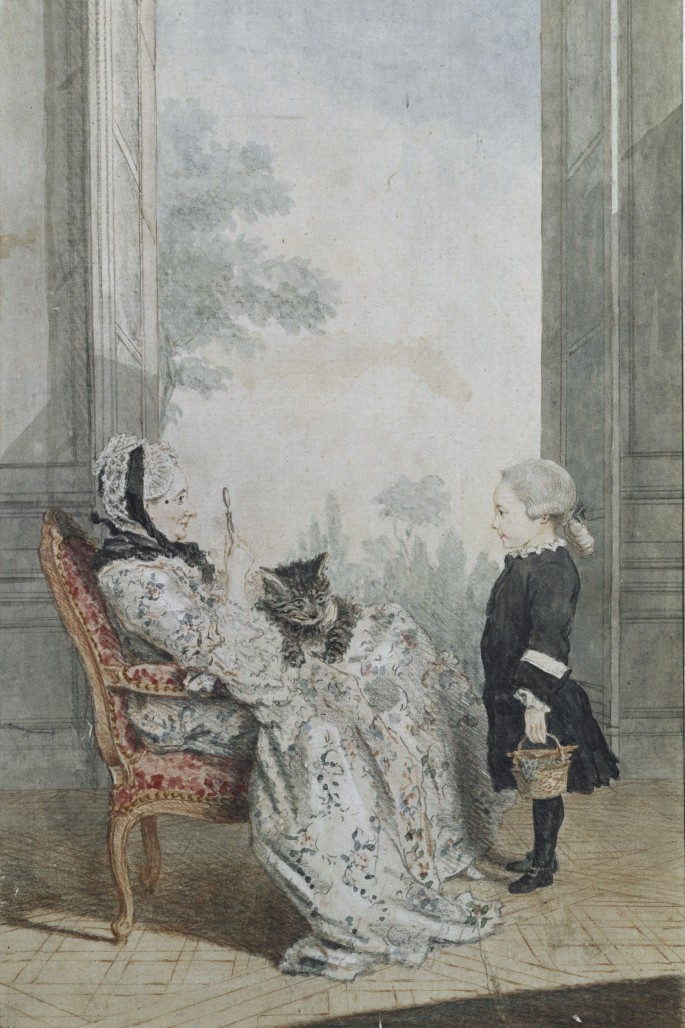
Joseph-Alexandre Pierre, Vicomte de Ségur, with his grandmother Philippa Angélique, Comtesse de Ségur, née de Froissy. Portrayed by Louis Carrogis Carmontelle in 1763.

Already during his lifetime, Pierre Victor de Besenval polarised opinion, both in France and in his homeland, Switzerland. Loved by some, hated by others, or at least viewed with suspicion, he did not leave his contemporaries indifferent.

The anecdotes and stories about Pierre Victor de Besenval in the memoirs of contemporary personalities are legendary. The baron is mentioned in the memoirs and letters of, among others, the following personalities:
In alphabetical order

- Rose Bertin, a French fashion merchant and fashion advisor to Queen Marie-Antoinette
- Gabriel de Broglie, the families de Besenval and de Broglie have been related since 1733 through marriage, when Pierre Victor den Besenval's sister, Théodora Élisabeth Catherine (1718–1777), married Charles Guillaume Louis, Marquis de Broglie (1716–1786). Later marriages between the families Cabot de Dampmartin (de Besenval) and de Broglie followed.
- Alexandre-Théodore Brongniart, a French architect who carried out significant renovations at the Hôtel de Besenval
- Henriette Campan, Première Femme de Chambre of Queen Marie-Antoinette
- François-René, Vicomte de Chateaubriand, a French writer and critic of the Baron de Besenval
- Louise-Élisabeth de Croÿ, Duchesse de Tourzel, governess of the Children of France from 1789 until 1792
- Emmanuel, Duc de Croÿ, Prince de Solre et du Saint-Empire, a French General, Maréchal de France and close friend of Pierre Victor de Besenval
- Raymond Desèze, the lawyer of Pierre Victor de Besenval
- Jean-Baptiste-Denis Després, Pierre Victor de Besenval's secretary
- Lazare Duvaux, a French marchand-mercier
- Ludwig von Flüe, the baron's liaison officer in the defense of the Bastille in 1789
- Victor von Gibelin, the baron's comrade and relative in whose arms he died in 1791
- Pierre Granié, a French jurist, historian and writer
- François-Emmanuel Guignard, Comte de Saint-Priest, a French diplomat
- Gouverneur Morris, Minister Plenipotentiary of the United States of America to the Court of Versailles, a loyal friend of Pierre Victor de Besenval. He visited him several times in prison and had lunch with him there. He was also present at the baron's court hearings
- Antoine de Rivarol, a French writer
- Charles Augustin Sainte-Beuve, a French literary critic
- Joseph-Alexandre Pierre, Vicomte de Ségur, the baron's son
- Louis Philippe, Comte de Ségur, the Vicomte de Ségur's half-brother
- Luc-Vincent Thiéry, a French lawyer and author. In 1787, he published a report on the Hôtel de Besenval and its art treasures, based on an exclusive visit led by Pierre Victor de Besenval himself
- Joseph Hyacinthe François de Paule de Rigaud, Comte de Vaudreuil, together with Pierre Victor, Baron de Besenval, and Jean-Balthazar d'Adhémar de Montfalcon, Comte d'Adhémar, they were the three most influential gentlemen of the Société de la Reine, the most influential court society of Queen Marie Antoinette, whose members met regularly at the Petit Trianon

"The Baron de Besenval, whose very French levity made one forget he was born Swiss."

— Louis Philippe, Comte de Ségur

== Literary works (partial list) ==
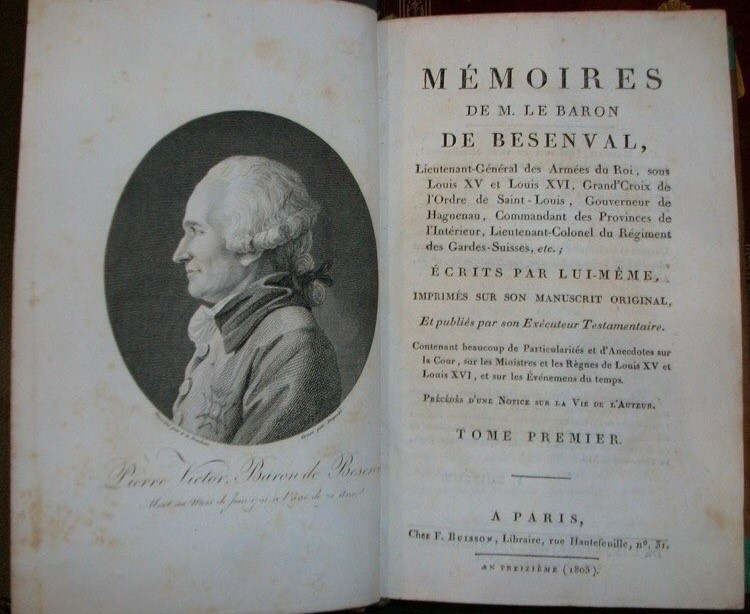
The frontispiece of the first edition of the memoirs of the Baron de Besenval showing his portrait. The memoirs were published between 1805 and 1806 in four volumes.

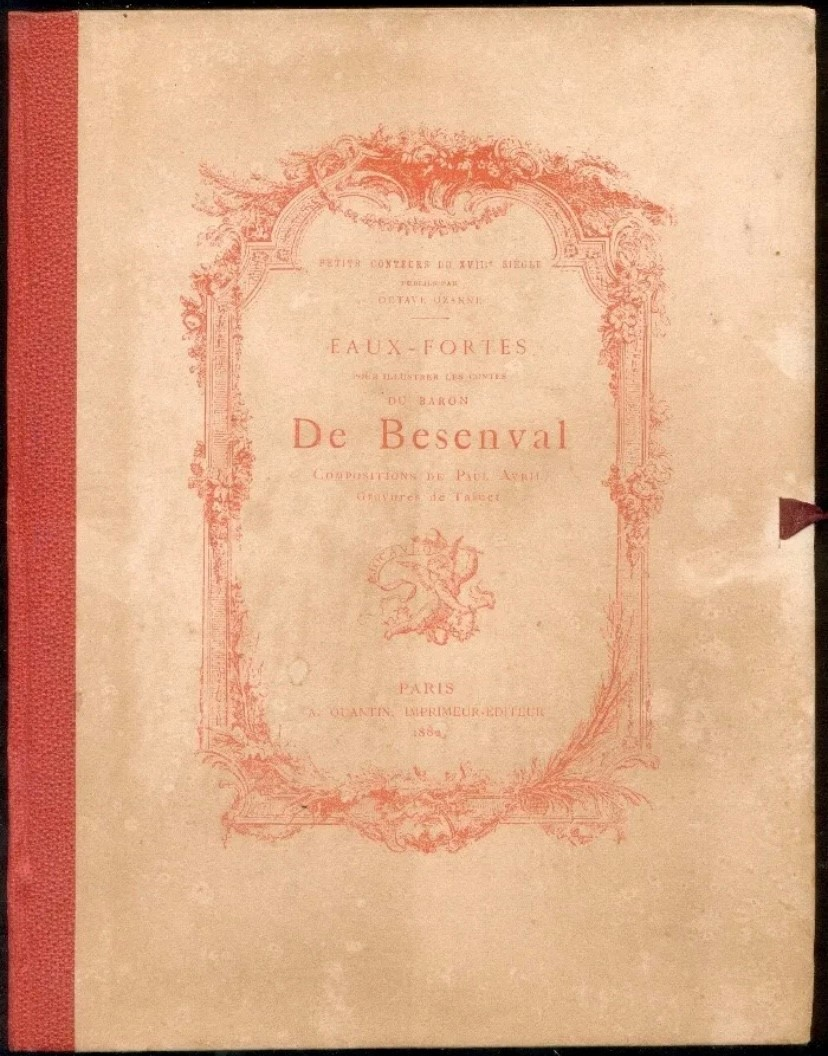
Cover of the portfolio with six etchings for the publishing of the Contes de M. le Baron de Besenval, published by Albert Quantin (1850–1933) in 1881. The pictorial compositions and etchings were created by Paul Avril and Ferdinand Taluet (1820–1904). The portfolio was published by Octave Uzanne in Paris in 1882.

Pierre Victor de Besenval authored moral-philosophical essays, novels, tales and poetic epistles. However, he is principally known as the author of his memoires, which were published between 1805 and 1806 by Joseph-Alexandre Pierre, Vicomte de Ségur, in which are reported many scandalous tales of the court of King Louis XVI and Queen Marie Antoinette. The family de Besenval questioned the authenticity of the memoirs and distanced themselves from them.

"I am fond of the Memoirs of Besenval; in them one finds the French of 1770 and the court of Louis XVI."

— Stendhal

The publisher characterised the entire literary work of Pierre Victor de Besenval as: A miscellany of literary, historical and political pieces; to which are added several poems.

- Le Spleen
- Idées politiques et militaires
- Les Amans soldats
- Féerie
- Socrate et Gassendi
- Alonzo
- Cœlia
- Réflexions sur la Comédie
- L'Hermite
- Réflexions sur le Ton
- Histoire de Revenans
- Pensées détachées
- Nouvelle espagnole
- Du Chagrin
- Anecdote bretonne
- Première Scène d'une Comédie
- Aventure et Conversation de M. le Baron de Besenval avec une Dame de Wesel
- Opinion des Turcs sur les femmes
- Disgrace de Madame des Ursins et ce qui l'a occasionnée
- De la Douleur
- Traduction d'un ouvrage chinois sur les jardins
- Épître à Damon
- Épître au Comte de F…
- A l'Abbé Allaire, mon précepteur, en lui envoyant une collection d'auteurs latins
- Sur la mort du Comte de Frise [August Heinrich Graf von Friesen (1727–1755)], neveu du Maréchal de Saxe [ Hermann Moritz Graf von Sachsen (1696–1750)]

In 1881, the following tales by the Baron de Besenval were published in Paris by the French printer, publisher and writer Albert Quantin (1850–1933) in a single volume entitled Contes de M. le Baron de Besenval: Le Spleen, Les Amans soldats, Féerie, Alonzo, Cœlia, L'Hermite, Histoire de Revenans, Nouvelle espagnole, Anecdote bretonne and Aventure et Conversation de M. le Baron de Besenval avec une Dame de Wesel.

The publication appeared in a small, limited edition; the bindings were often unique and, in some cases, extremely elaborate in their artistic design. The pictorial compositions and etchings were created by Paul Avril and Ferdinand Taluet (1820–1904). The illustrations were also issued separately in a portfolio in 1882.

== Gallery: Selected writings by and articles, poems and ephemera about Pierre Victor de Besenval ==
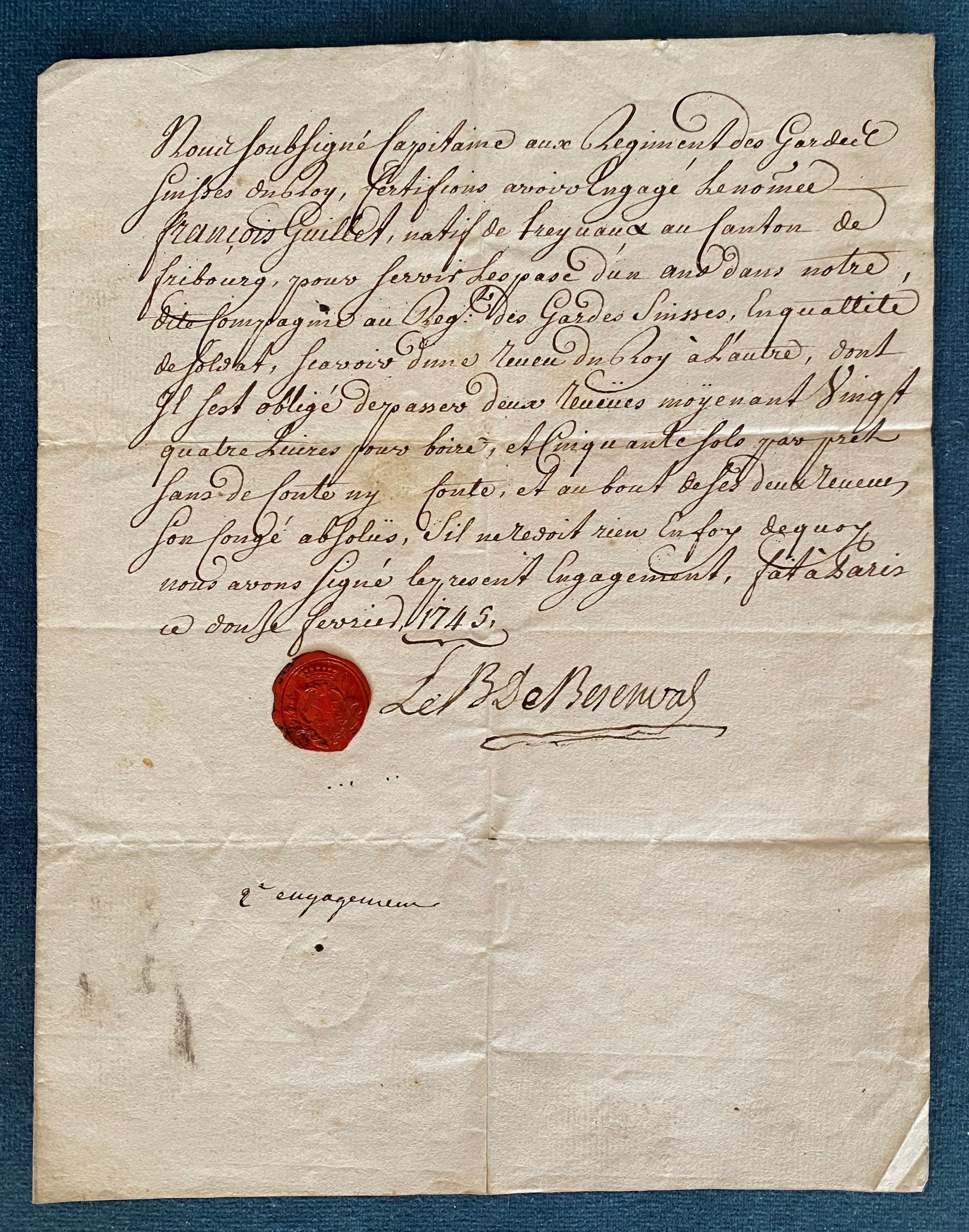
Original document by Pierre Victor, Baron de Besenval, with his seal, signed and dated, Paris, 12 February 1745 (in his capacity as Captain of the Company de Besenval, his company in the Swiss Guards Regiment)

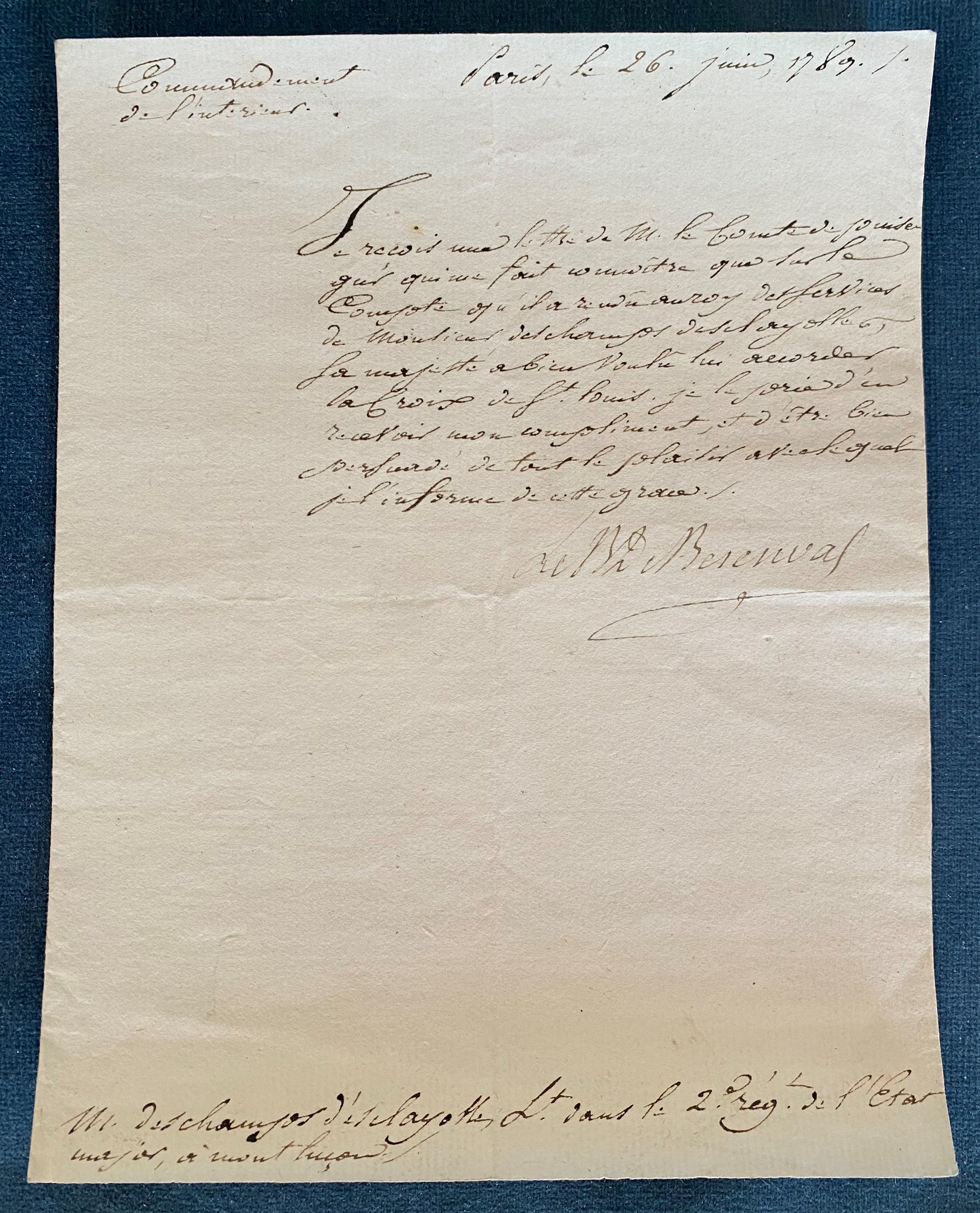
Original document by Pierre Victor, Baron de Besenval, signed and dated, Paris, 26 June 1789 (at the height of his military career)

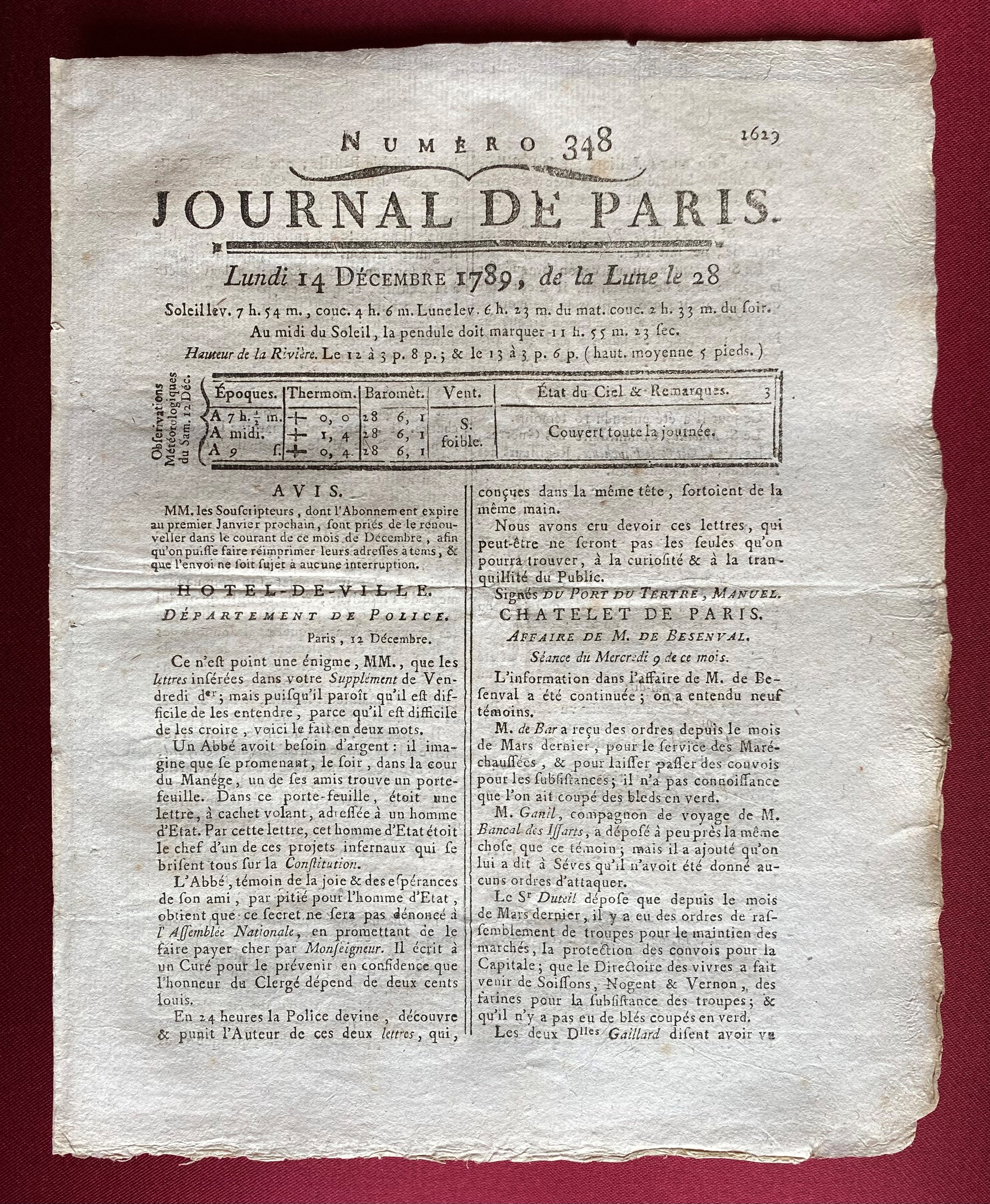
During his trial on charges of the crime of lèse-nation, the Baron de Besenval featured prominently for months in the Journal de Paris and other newspapers

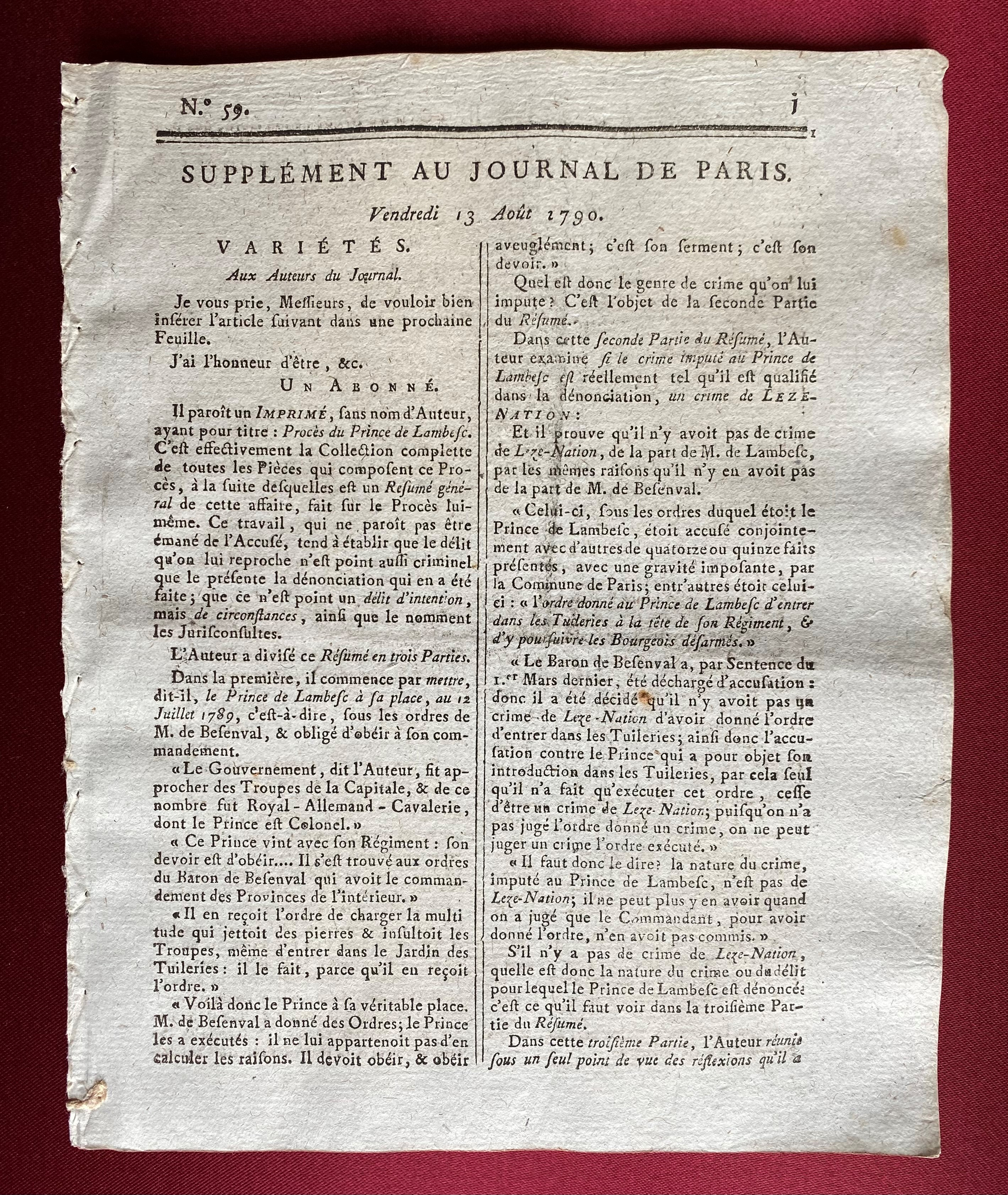
Excerpt from the Journal de Paris, no. 225, Friday, 13 August 1790: Acquittal of the Baron de Besenval from the accusation of the crime of lèse-nation on 1 March 1790

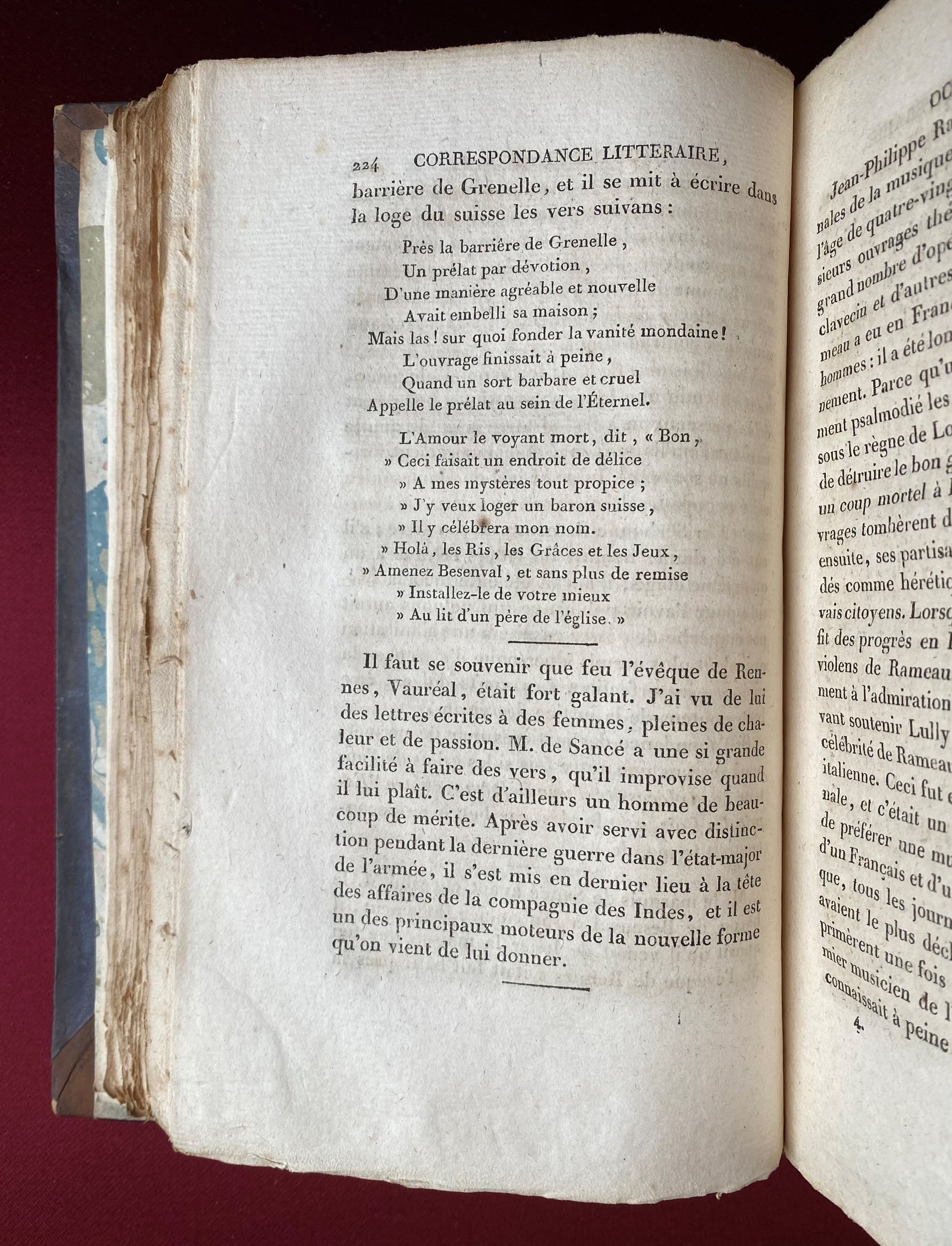
The only poem ever written about Pierre Victor, Baron de Besenval, and his residence, the Hôtel de Besenval. The amusingly sarcastic poem was written by the baron's friend Jean-Baptiste du Tertre, Marquis de Sancé

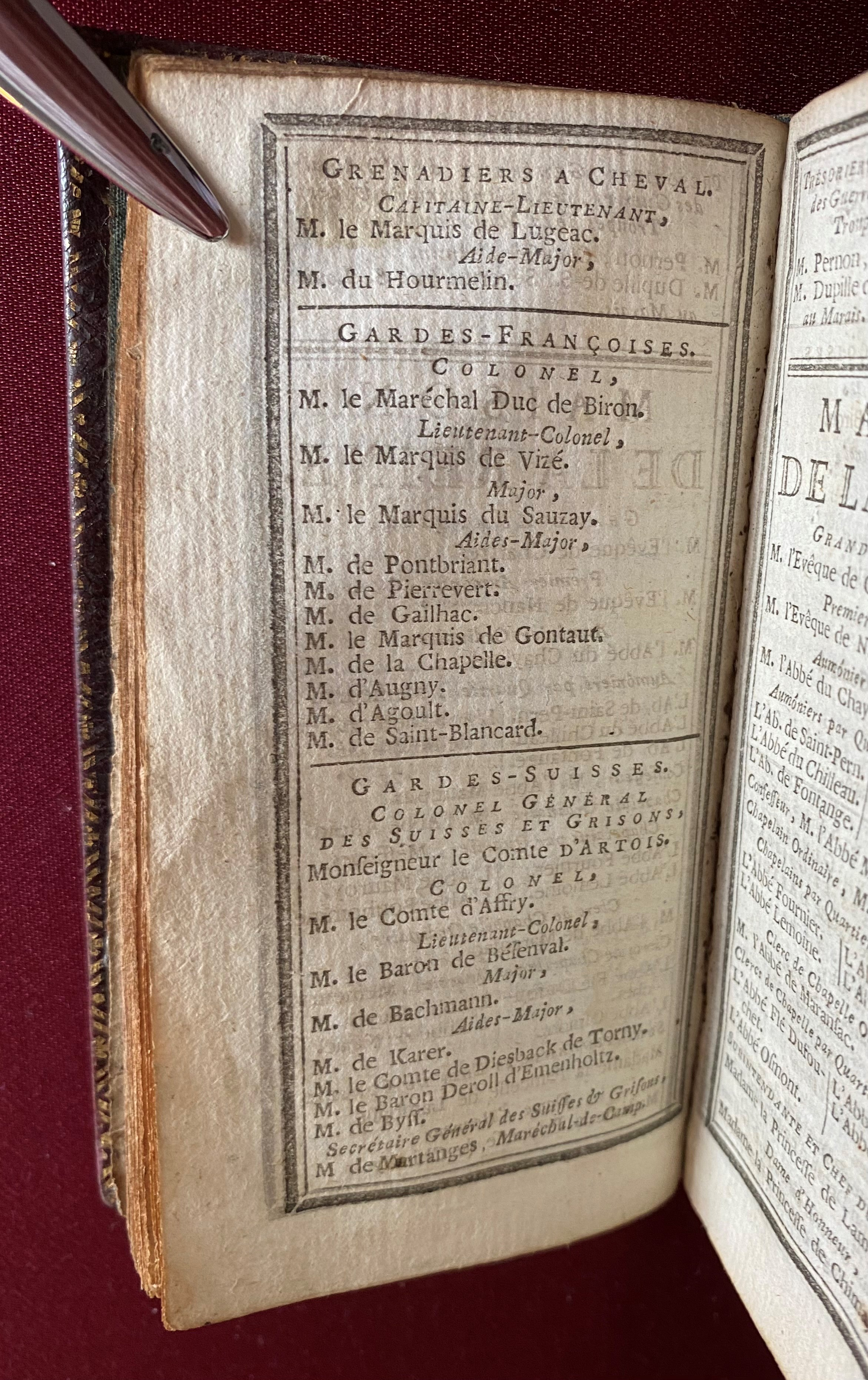
Pierre Victor de Besenval's mention in the Calendrier de la cour in 1776 as Lieutenant-Colonel of the Swiss Guards. During the fateful days of July 1789, he assumed the role of deputy as Louis-Auguste Augustin, Comte d'Affry, was sidelined by illness

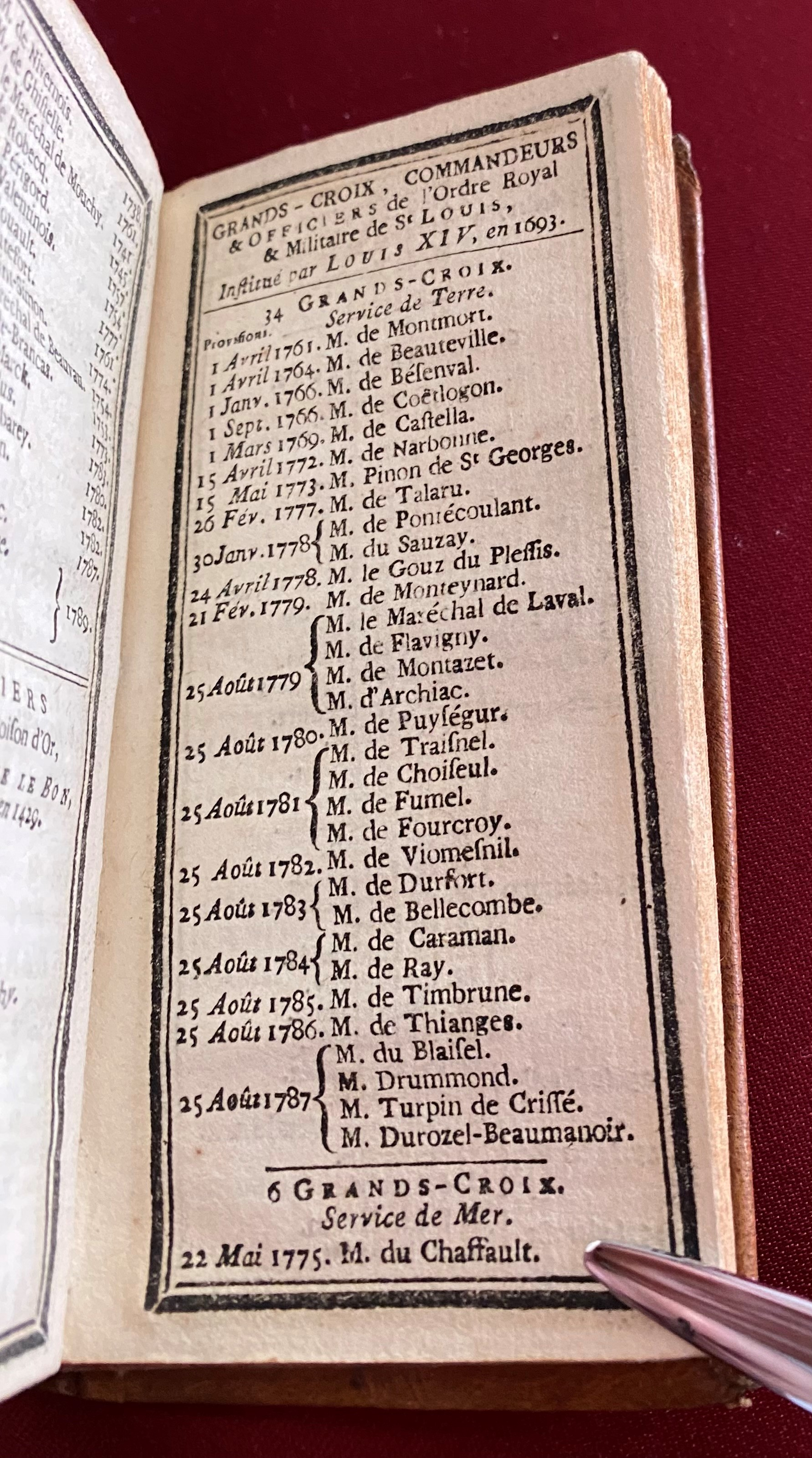
The last mention of Pierre Victor de Besenval in the Calendrier de la cour of 1791, the year of his death, as a recipient of the Order of Saint Louis, which was awarded to him on 1 January 1766
