= Louis, duc de La Chastre =

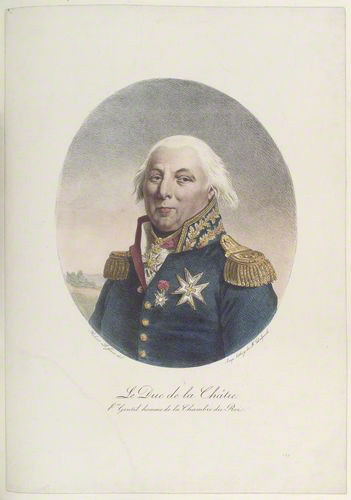
Claude-Louis de La Châtre

Duke de La Chastre's coat of arms

Claude-Louis-Raoul de La Châtre, otherwise known as Louis, duc de La Chastre (30 September 1745 – 13 July 1824) was an aristocratic French military commander, diplomat and politician of the 18th and 19th centuries.

== Career ==
The elder son of Lieutenant-General Charles-Louis, marquis de La Châtre (1724-1793) by his wife Isabelle (1725-1794) daughter of Claude, marquis de Traînel, his relatives included Maria Antonia, Duchess of Bavaria and Electress of Saxony as well as Charles Edward Stuart (The Young Pretender).

Styled comte de Nançay after 1734, he was commissioned as a Sous-lieutenant in the French Army in 1756, becoming a Lieutenant in the Régiment du Boulonnois in 1761, Captain in 1764 and then in 1770 Lieutenant-Colonel in the Grenadiers. In 1771 he was seconded as Colonel of the Régiment de Royal-Vaisseaux, becoming a Gentlemen of the Privy Chamber to Prince Louis, comte de Provence and in 1774 Mestre-de-camp of the Régiment des dragons de Monsieur. He was promoted Brigadier in 1781, Maréchal-de-camp in 1788 and commanded the Guyenne Cavalry Regiment (1786–89).

After being appointed Royal Bailiff of Berry in 1788, he sat briefly as a deputy of the Estates-General in 1789.

His father, the marquis, was guillotined by the Revolutionaries in 1793 (when he succeeded to his father's titles), but La Chastre managed to escape to England where he raised the Régiment Loyal-Émigrant. Having commanded his troops with distinction throughout the Low Countries, Quiberon and Portugal, he returned to London in 1807.

He became the first French Ambassador to the Court of St James's under the Bourbon Restoration.

La Chastre was created a peer of France (1815) and duke (1816) by King Louis XVIII, in addition to receiving other honours.

He was married to Marie Charlotte Louise Perrette Aglaé Bontemps from 1778 until their divorce in 1793.

== Honours and titles ==
Collar of the Saint-Esprit

- Duc de France
- Grand-croix, Ordre de Saint-Louis
- Chevalier, Ordre de Malte
- Chevalier, Ordres Royaux, Militaires et Hospitaliers de Notre-Dame du Mont-Carmel et de Saint-Lazare de Jérusalem Réunis
- Chevalier, Ordre du Saint-Esprit
- Officier, Légion d'honneur

== See also ==
- List of Ambassadors of France to the United Kingdom
- Maison de La Châtre (in French)
