= Raymond de Sèze =

French advocate (1750–1828)

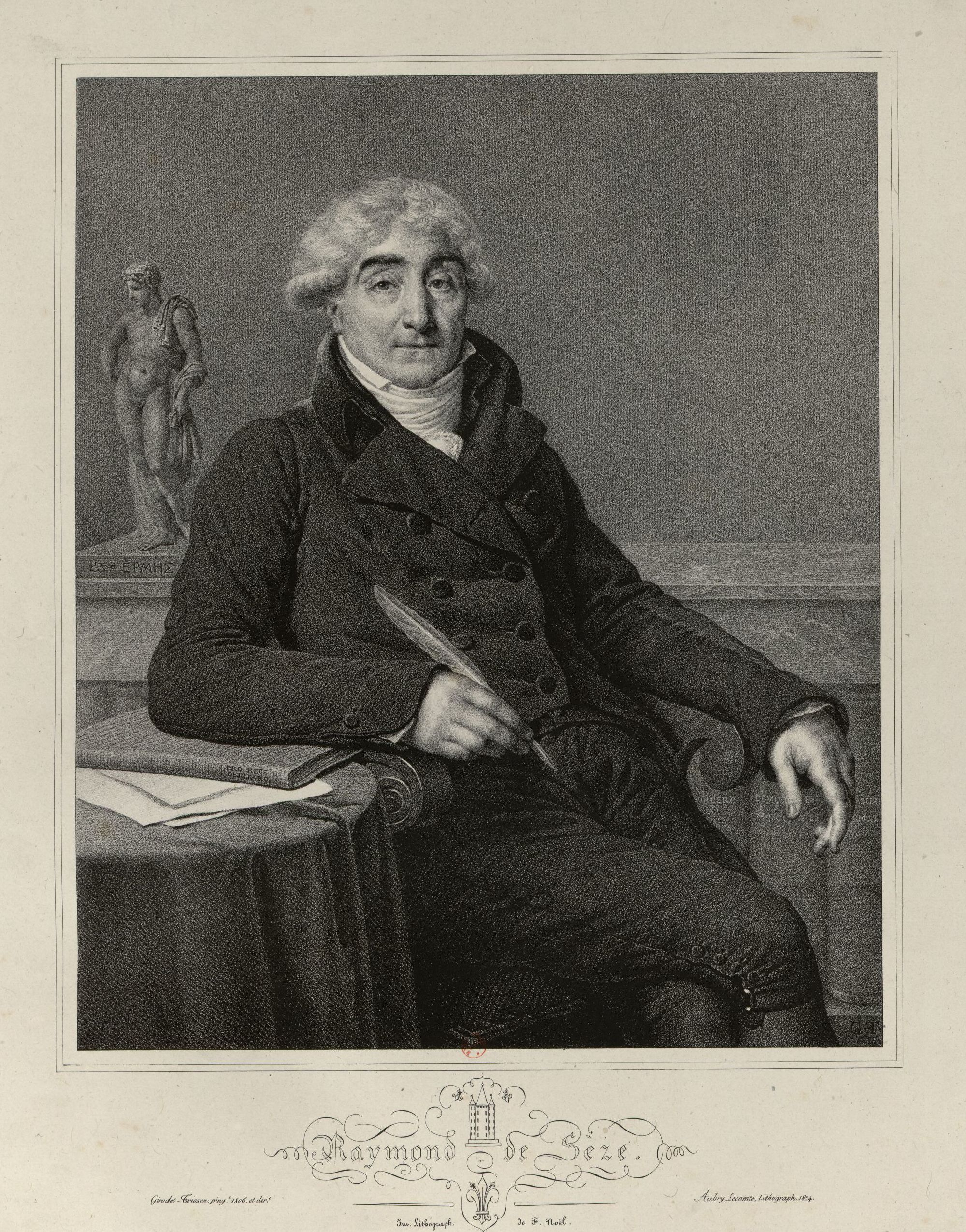
Raymond de Sèze.

Raymond Romain, Comte de Sèze or Desèze (26 September 1750 – 2 May 1828) was a French advocate. Together with François Tronchet and Malesherbes, he defended Louis XVI, when the King was brought before the Convention for trial. De Sèze is remembered for a speech on Louis' behalf which impressed even his opponents.

== Life ==
Raymond de Sèze was born in Bordeaux, Aquitaine, and studied in the famous law school of that city. He gained a reputation for remarkable passion and persuasiveness, and came to prominence in 1789 when he defended Pierre Victor, Baron de Besenval de Brunstatt, against the charge of the crime of lèse-nation.

When, at forty-four, he was called out of retirement to assist Louis XVI's defence, he was considered one of the best lawyers in France. Though he had to prepare his defence arguments in a short amount of time, his brilliance shone through in a first draft that, although moving, Louis rejected as too rhetorical, saying, "I do not want to play on their (the Convention's) feelings". When the time for the real defence came, despite having had no sleep for over four days, de Sèze pleaded the King's case for three hours, arguing eloquently yet discreetly that the Convention should spare his life. Beginning with a description of why the charges were invalid (under the terms of the constitution of 1791 Louis, as King, was immune from prosecution), he attacked the right of Convention to stand as judge and jury. Finally, he moved to a rejection of the charges in the acte enonciatif drawn up by the constitution charge by charge, with a royalist history of the revolution, portraying Louis as 'the restorer of French Liberty". De Sèze finished, like many of the set-piece speeches of the revolution, with an appeal to history:

Louis ascended the throne at the age of twenty, and at the age of twenty he gave to the throne the example of character. He brought to the throne no wicked weaknesses, no corrupting passions. He was economical, just, severe. He showed himself always the constant friend of the people. The people wanted the abolition of servitude. He began by abolishing it on his own lands. The people asked for reforms in the criminal law... he carried out these reforms. The people wanted liberty: he gave it to them. The people themselves came before him in his sacrifices. Nevertheless, it is in the name of these very people that one today demands... Citizens, I cannot finish... I stop myself before History. Think how it will judge your judgement, and that the judgement of him will be judged by the centuries.

Jean-Paul Marat, the démagogue of the sans-culottes, was favourably impressed, and declared: "De Séze read a long speech made with a great deal of art". The Commune, the most violent of the factions at the time, described the speech as "very adroit". Nevertheless, the case was lost, and the King was sent to the guillotine.

De Sèze himself was imprisoned during the revolution, but he managed to elude the scaffold. He was released after the fall of Robespierre, but he disappeared from public life, serving neither the Directory nor the Napoleonic government, both of which he saw as illegitimate. Upon the return of the Bourbons he was made a peer, as well as a judge and a member of the French Academy, before dying at the age of seventy eight.

== Source ==
- The King's Trial (Louis XVI vs The French Revolution), David P. Jordan, University of California Press, Twenty-Fifth Anniversary Edition. Copyright 1979, 2004
