= Comtesse de la Châtre =

1789 painting by Elisabeth Louise Vigée Le Brun

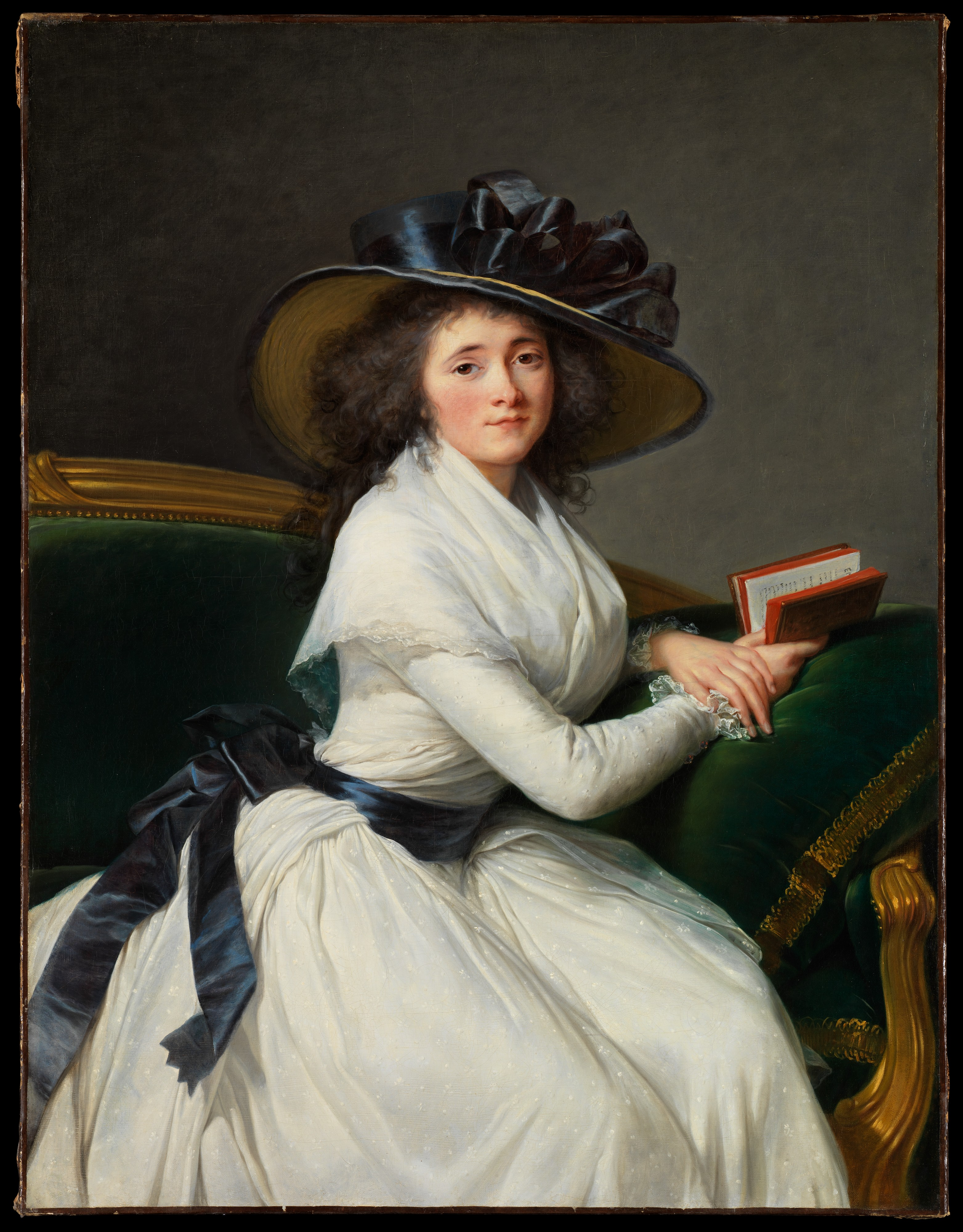
- Artist: Élisabeth Vigée Le Brun
- Year: 1789
- Medium: oil paint, canvas
- Dimensions: 114.3 cm (45.0 in) × 87.6 cm (34.5 in)
- Location: Metropolitan Museum of Art
- Accession: 54.182

Comtesse de la Châtre (English: Countess de la Châtre) is an oil on canvas painting by Élisabeth Vigée Le Brun, from 1789. It is held in the collection of the Metropolitan Museum of Art, in New York.

== Description ==
The portrait depicts the Marie Charlotte Louise Perrette Aglaé Bontemps,Comtesse de la Châtre,wife of the Claude Louis, Comte de la Châtre and future wife of the French minister François Arnail de Jaucourt.She is depicted wearing a fashionable white muslin dress with a linen fichu and blue silk sash around her waist. On her head she wears a wide brimmed straw hat with silk bows.

It was through the Comtesse de la Chatre´s patronage (and close familial connections to the French court) Vigeé-Lebrun that was introduced to and became one of Marie-Antoinette´s favorite portraitists. The portrait of the Comtesse de la Chatre was among one the last commission that Vigée-Lebrun was able to finish before she had to flee France after the Storming of the Bastille in october 1789.

The Comtesse de la Chatre went into exile the following year and ended up in England.

The painting was bought by Jessie Woolworth Donahue in 1942, and donated to The Metropolitan Museum in 1954.

The work is on view at The Metropolitan Museum's Gallery 631.
