= Grand Châtelet =

Demolished stronghold in Ancien Régime Paris

Coordinates: 48.8574°N 2.3471°E

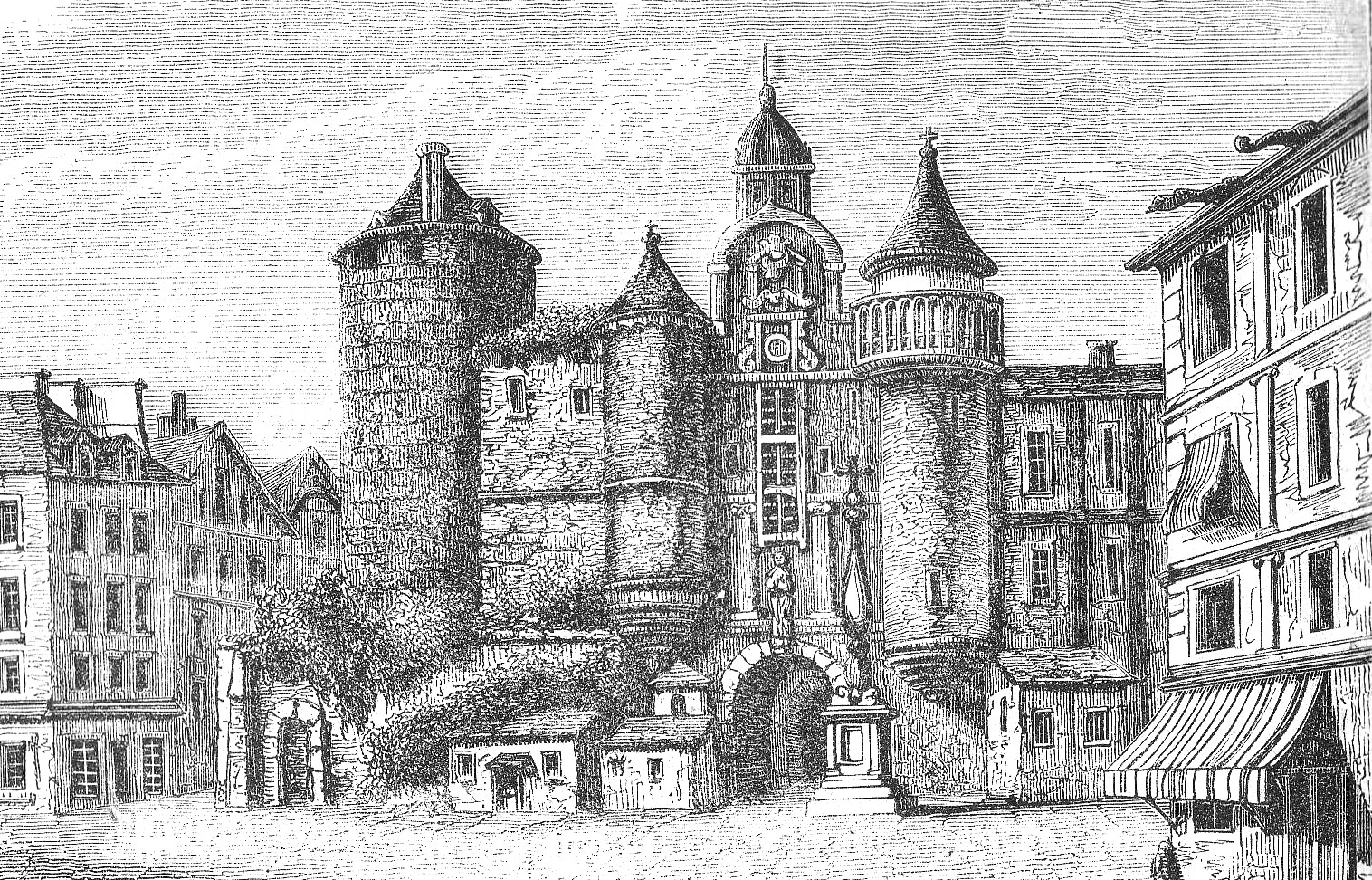
The Grand Châtelet around 1800, looking south from the rue Saint-Denis

The Grand Châtelet was a fortress in Ancien Régime Paris, on the right bank of the Seine, on the site of what is now the Place du Châtelet; it contained a court and police headquarters and a number of prisons.

== History ==
The original building on the site may have been a wooden tower constructed by Charles the Bald in 870 to defend the then new Grand-Pont bridge (now replaced by the Pont au Change), but it is known that Louis VI built a stronger structure in stone, a châtelet ('small castle'), in 1130; it was called the Grand Châtelet in contrast to the Petit Châtelet built around the same time at the end of the Petit Pont, on the south bank of the Seine.

It lost its defensive purpose in 1190 when Philip Augustus built a rampart around the perimeter of the city; from then on it served as the headquarters of the prévôt de Paris, the official "charged with protection of royal rights, oversight of royal administration, and execution of royal justice" in late medieval Paris. The court of the Châtelet was always subordinate to the Parlement of Paris, but it had extensive criminal and civil jurisdiction, and treason cases were frequently tried there. For centuries, the magistrates of the Châtelet clashed with those of the Hôtel de Ville over jurisdiction.

The Châtelet was rebuilt by Charles V, but by 1460 it had fallen into such disrepair that the sittings of the court were held at the Louvre, not returning until 1506; in 1657 the court was once again forced to move temporarily, this time to the convent of the Grands Augustins on the Rue Dauphine. In 1684 the structure was almost completely rebuilt by Louis XIV, taking on the form that it had until it was demolished after the Revolution. "The roadway which passed under the Chatelet (in effect the continuation of the Rue Saint-Denis) set apart the municipal prison on the eastern side of the structure from the various magisterial chambers to the west." Under the western side lay the city morgue; the prisons on the eastern side increased in number from nine to twenty over the years, ranging from dormitories where prisoners lived "à la pistole", that is with beds, to those called "au secret", ranging from a huge hall with straw mats to subterranean dungeons.

Like all edifices in the Old Regime connected with the administration of justice, the Châtelet enjoyed a very sinister reputation, even worse than the storied Bastille. Relatively few Parisians of common stock were ever able to claim the dubious distinction that a relative or friend languished in the dungeons of the Bastille; many more could make the claim for the dank chambers of the Châtelet, inherently far more fearsome than the dry and relatively comfortable prison a mile to the east.

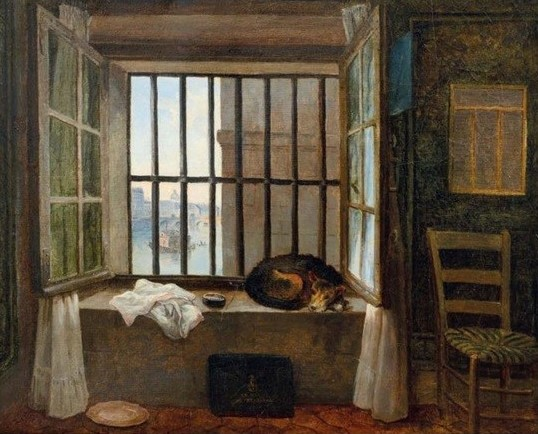
Vue de la cellule du Baron de Besenval à la prison du Châtelet, by Hubert Robert (1789). Formerly the baron's collection at the Hôtel de Besenval.

Among the famous prisoners who spent time in the Grand Châtelet was Pierre Victor, Baron de Besenval de Brunstatt. The imprisonment of the Baron de Besenval in the Grand Châtelet was immortalised in the painting Vue de la cellule du Baron de Besenval à la prison du Châtelet (View from the Baron de Besenval's cell in the Châtelet prison), painted by Hubert Robert in 1789. Further famous prisoners were Clément Marot, who composed his Enfer there; the famous highwayman Cartouche; the poisoner Antoine-François Desrues (1744–1777); and the marquis de Favras.

The area around the Châtelet was physically unpleasant as well, due to the smell of drying blood from nearby slaughterhouses and "the effluent of the great sewers that oozed into the Seine between the Pont Notre-Dame and the Pont-au-Change." In 1790, with the abolition of the office of prévôt de Paris, the Châtelet lost its function, and as part of the general refurbishment of the area it was demolished between 1802 and 1810 and the Place du Châtelet created at the north end of the bridge.
