= Siege of Ypres (1744) =

Siege in the War of the Austrian Succession

- Part of War of the Austrian Succession
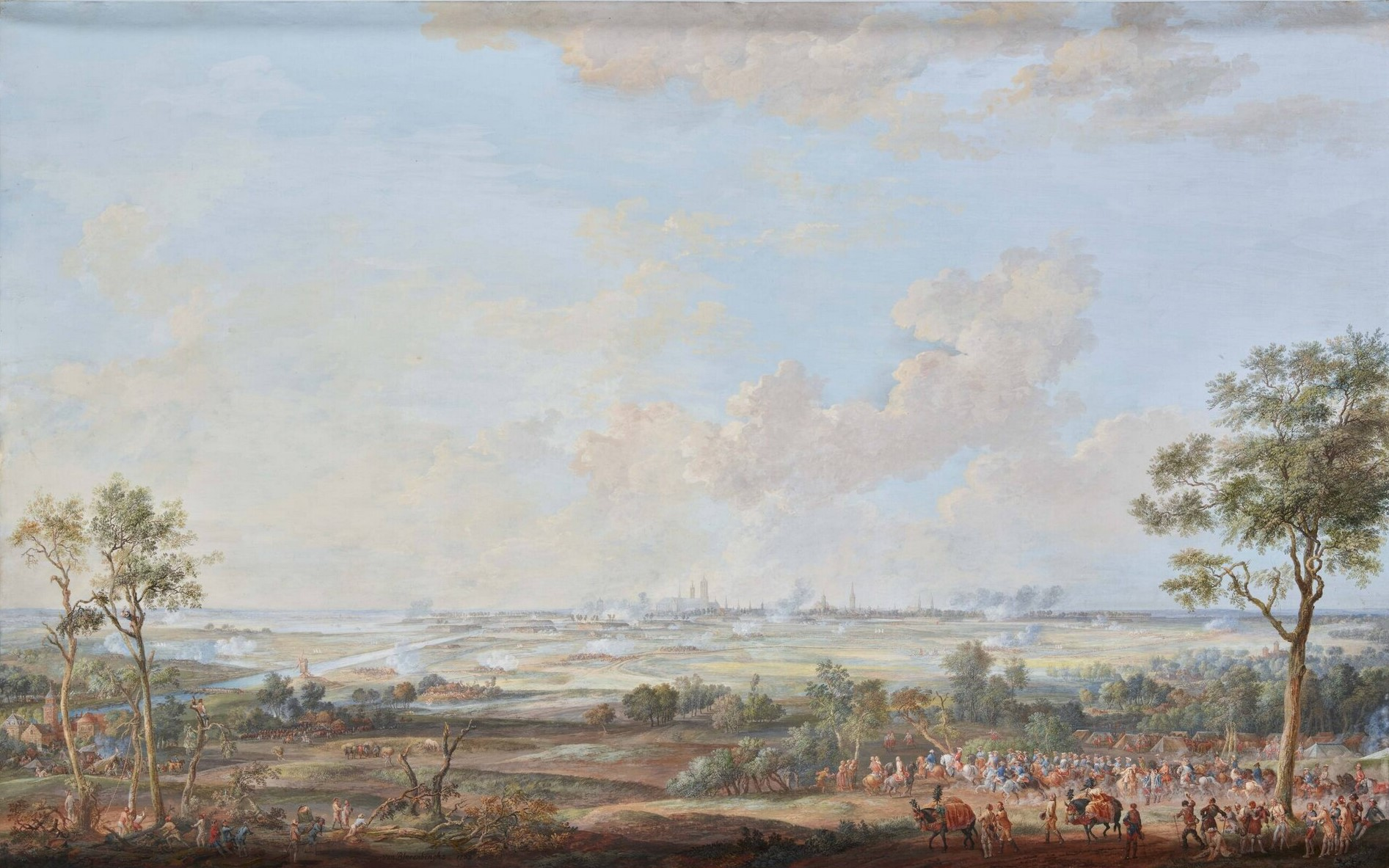
- Siege of Ypres, from 6 to 25 June 1744 by Louis-Nicolas van Blarenberghe, 1783
Date	15–24 June 1744
Location	Ypres, Austrian Netherlands
Result	French victory

Belligerents
France	Dutch Republic

Commanders and leaders
(Kingdom of France) Duke of Noailles (Kingdom of France) Maurice de Saxe (Kingdom of France) Louis XV	(Dutch Republic) William of Hesse-Philippsthal-Barchfeld

Strength
87,000	3,000

Casualties and losses
Unknown	Unknown

The siege of Ypres took place between 15 and 24 June 1744 during the War of the Austrian Succession. A French army under the nominal command of King Louis XV and operational command of the Duke of Noailles, took the city from its Dutch garrison after a short siege.

== Prelude ==
Before 1744, the Austrian Netherlands had been kept out of the War of the Austrian Succession, which had been fought since 1740 in Eastern Europe and Italy. In 1744, Louis XV decided to attack the Netherlands and left Versailles to lead his army in person.
The first Barrier fortress they attacked was Menin, which surrendered after a siege of only one week. The surrender of Menin had been hastened by the passive stance of the main Allied armies, which remained east of the Scheldt river. The next target of the French was Ypres.

== Siege ==
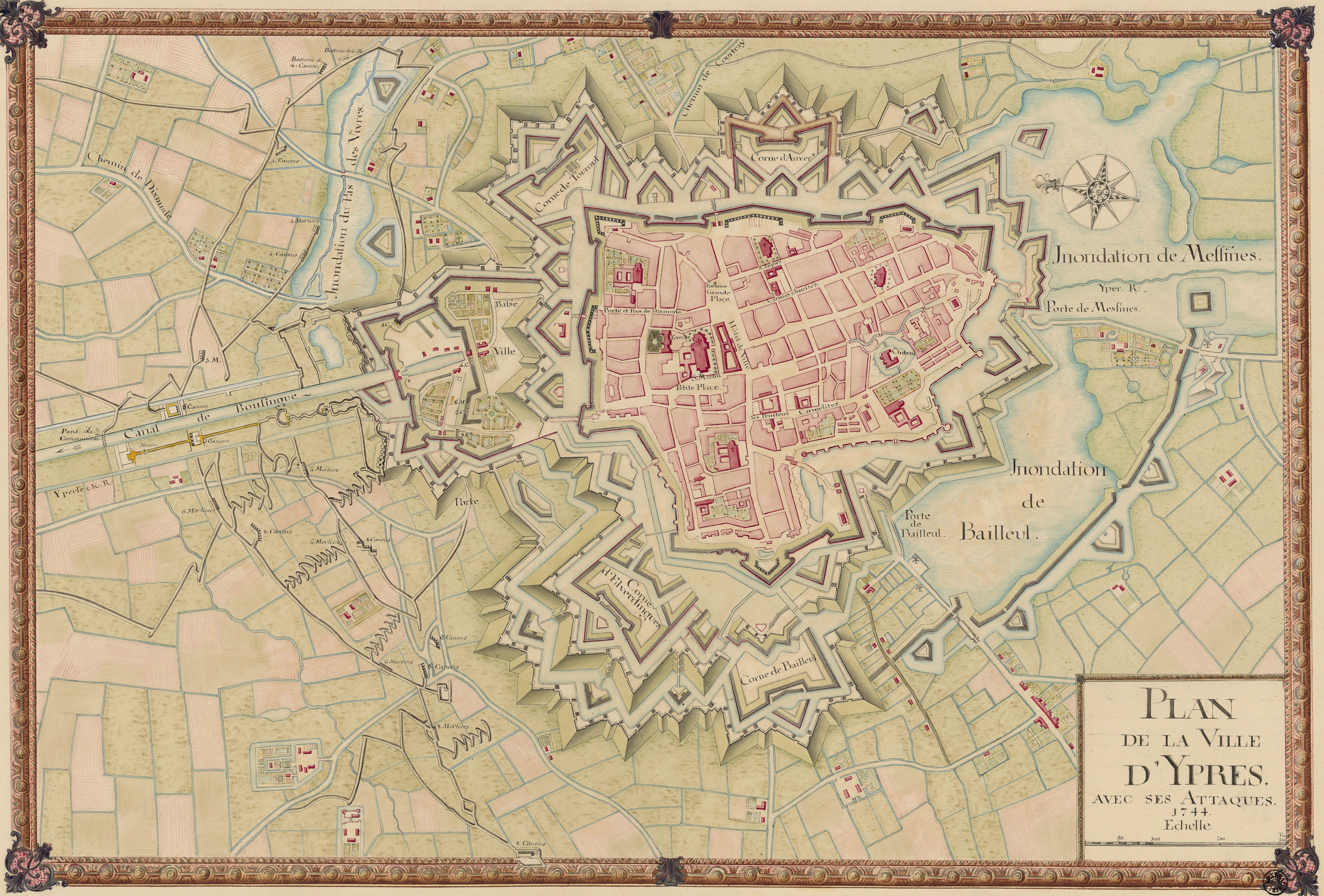
Plan of the Siege of Ypres, 1744

Because Ypres was defended by a larger garrison than Menen, and its fortresses, built by Vauban, were in a better condition, the army of Maurice de Saxe was also called in, to help take the fortress.

Before the end of the siege of Menin, troops under command of Count of Clermont and Maurice de Saxe were already sent to Ypres, to prepare the siege and to take some advanced redoubts.

Between 9 and 14 June, the bulk of the army arrived, and the headquarters were established at nearby Vlamertinge. On 15 June, the digging of the trenches began. In the night of 19 to 20 June, two further redoubts were conquered. Despite the efforts of the defenders, the digging of the trenches progressed quickly. After conquering a third redoubt, in the night of 23–24 June, an important attack was launched against the lower city, which was taken in the morning of the 24th after heavy fighting.

Knowing that no help was on the way, and responding to the urgent demand of the population, William of Hesse-Philippsthal had the white flag hoisted on 25 June. The next day the surrender was signed and the Dutch were allowed to leave the city with their baggage, 6 cannons and 4 mortars on 29 June.

== Aftermath ==
The French army advanced further towards the North Sea and also captured the other Barrier cities Fort Knokke on 28 June, and Furnes (Veurne) on 11 July. Further actions in Flanders were then halted, as the main army was sent to the Alsace to repel an Austrian incursion there.
The next major action in the Austrian Netherlands would be the siege of Tournai in late April 1745.

The French evacuated Ypres after the Treaty of Aix-la-Chapelle (1748).

== Sources ==
- Browning, Reed. The War of the Austrian Succession. Alan Sutton Publishing, 1994.
- Painting by Louis Nicolas Van Blarenberghe originally in the Chateau de Versailles, now in the Louvre.
- Gallica, Victoire remportée sur la ville d'Ypres par notre auguste monarque le Roy Louis XV qui commandoit le siège en personne
