= Siege of Menin (1744) =

- Part of War of the Austrian Succession
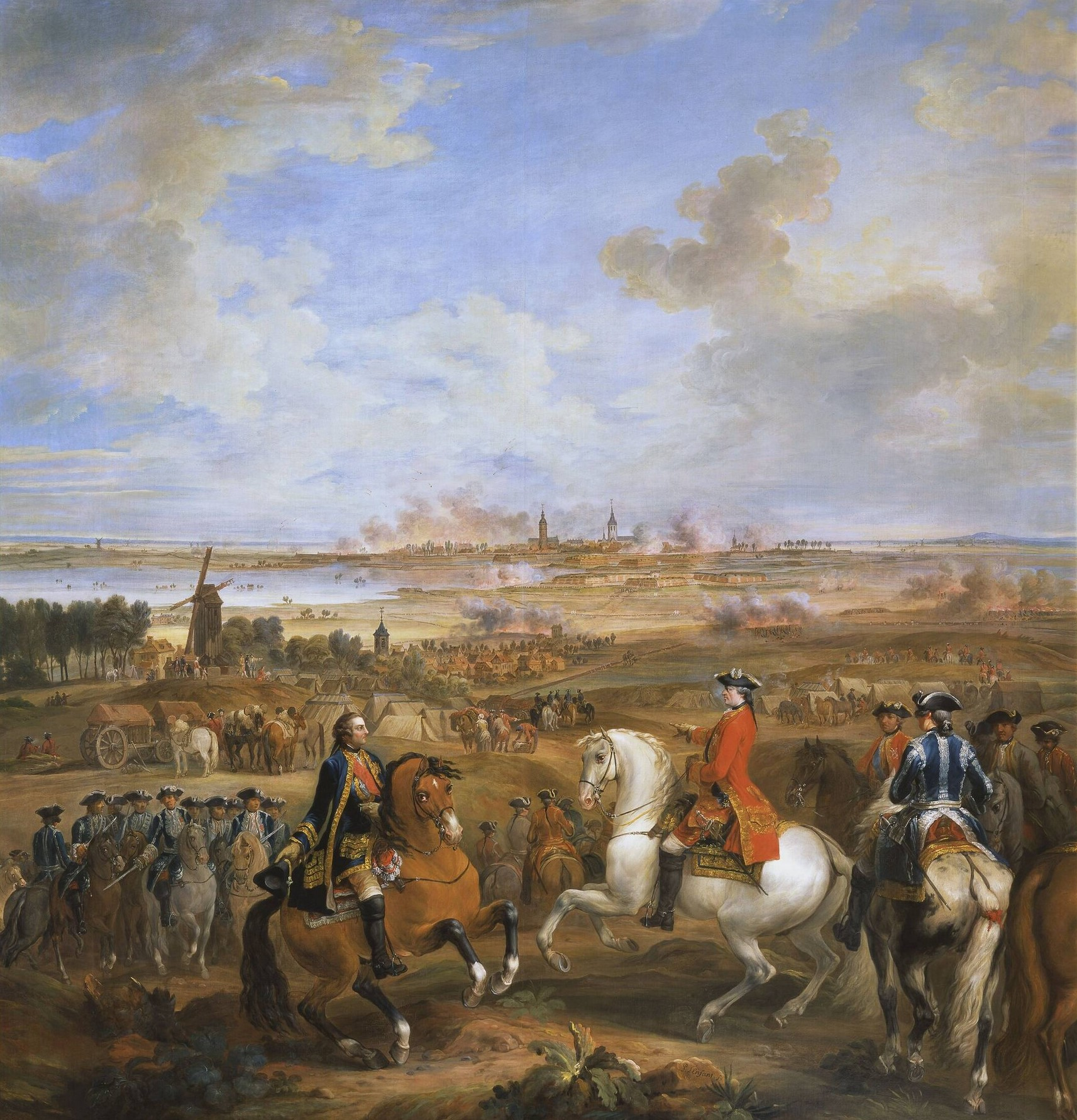
- Capture of Menin, 4 June 1744 by Pierre Lenfant, 1759–1767
| Date | 28 May – 4 June 1744 |
| Location | Menen (Menin), Austrian Netherlands |
| Result | French victory |

Belligerents
| France | Dutch Republic |

Commanders and leaders
| (Kingdom of France) Duke of Noailles (Kingdom of France) Louis XV | (Dutch Republic) Jan, Baron van Echten |

Strength
| 50,000 | 1,500 |

Casualties and losses
| Low | Low |

The siege of Menin took place between 28 May and 4 June 1744 during the War of the Austrian Succession, and was the first battle fought in the Austrian Netherlands. A French army under the nominal command of King Louis XV and operational command of the Duke of Noailles, took the city from its Dutch garrison after a short siege.

== Prelude ==
Before 1744, the Austrian Netherlands had been kept out of the War of the Austrian Succession, which had been fought since 1740 in Eastern Europe and Italy. In 1744, Louis XV decided to attack the Netherlands and left Versailles to lead his army in person.
The Austrian Netherlands were defended by a small Austrian contingent of 7,000 men under command of Léopold, Duke of Arenberg, an ill-prepared Dutch force of some 20,000 men led by Maurice of Nassau-Ouwerkerk and a British-Hanoverian Army of 38,000 men under command of the 70 years old Field Marshal George Wade.

Menin was the Barrier fortress closest to France and the first to be besieged. The city had been reinforced by Vauban in the 1680s, but then severely damaged in the 1706 Siege.
The allied commanders didn't agree on how to react and remained inactive.

== The Siege ==
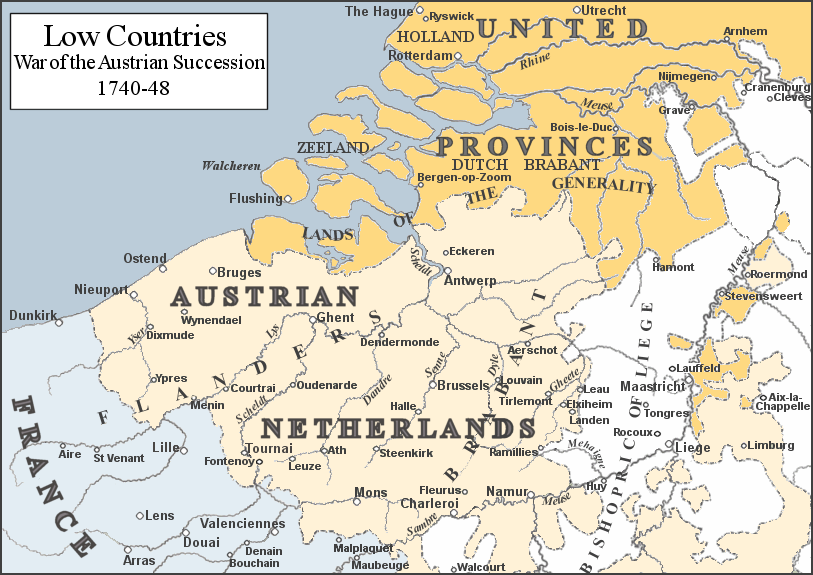
Menin, as Barrier city on the border with France.

The French surrounded Menin and started digging trenches on the East and West side of the city. The operations on the West side were directed towards the Ypres gate and were led by Noailles. On the East side, troops under command of the Count of Clermont had as objective the hornwork of Halluin. The city walls were bombarded from a closer and closer range and on 2 June a small breach appeared in the Halluin hornwork. French scouts found the stronghold deserted, except for 5 soldiers, who were taken prisoner. This accelerated the progress of the French trenches in the east and in the evening of 3 June they were ready for the main attack.

General van Echten did not wait for this attack and had the white flag hoisted on 4 June. Marshal Noailles allowed the Dutch force to march out of the city with all their weapons on 7 June.

== Aftermath ==
The French army advanced towards the North Sea and also captured the other Barrier cities Ypres (Ieper) on 26 June, Fort Knokke on 28 June, and Furnes (Veurne) on 11 July. Further actions in Flanders were then halted, as the main army was sent to the Alsace to repel an Austrian incursion there.
The next major action in the Austrian Netherlands would be the Siege of Tournai in late April 1745.

The French evacuated Menin after the Treaty of Aix-la-Chapelle (1748).

== Sources ==
- Browning, Reed. The War of the Austrian Succession. Alan Sutton Publishing, 1994.
- Painting by Pierre Lenfant in the Chateau de Versailles
- Gallica, Plans et journaux des sièges de la dernière guerre de Flandres, rassemblés par deux capitaines étrangers au service de France., page 1-4
