= French Assembly =

The term French Assembly may refer to any of several French legislative bodies throughout the history of France, including:

- The National Assembly (French Revolution) formed during the French Revolution on June 17, 1789
- The National Constituent Assembly, which succeeded the National Assembly on July 9, 1789
- The Legislative Assembly (France), which succeeded the National Constituent Assembly on October 1, 1791
- The modern National Assembly of France under the Third, Fourth, and Fifth Republics.
