= Joseph-Jean Lagarde =

French jurist and lawyer (1755–1839)

Joseph-Jean Lagarde, Baron of the First French Empire, (11 May 1755 – 9 July 1839), was an avocat, a magistrate and a French civil servant.

He was a member of the Etats généraux de 1789.

== Biography ==
Advocate in the Flanders parliament since 1776, he was named substitute adviser and prosecutor for the king on the royal domicile of the mastery in Lille on the 31 October 1781, guard consultant in the same seat (domicile) transitional on the 4 February 1782 and consultant in the royal seat (domicile) of bailiwick in Lille on the 30 January 1788. An intermission in the parliament of Flanders admitted him the practice of this office on the following 22 February, with exemption to exercise.
