= Grand Master of Ceremonies of France =

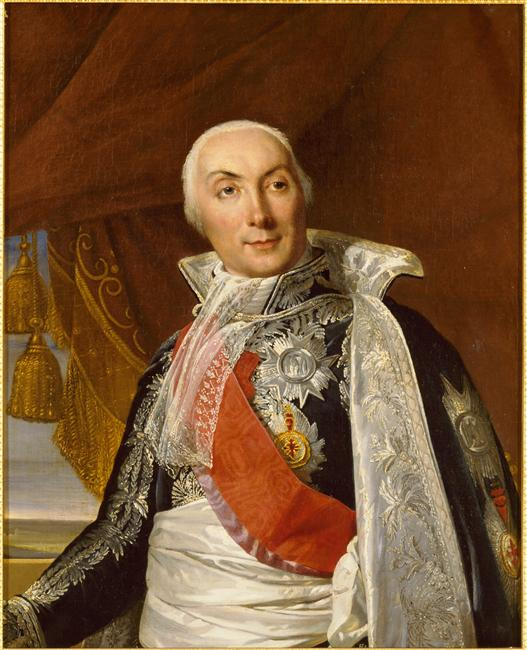
Louis Philippe, Marquis et Comte de Ségur, in the costume of the Grand Master of Ceremonies of the First Empire.

The Grand Master of Ceremonies of France or Grand maître des cérémonies de France was one of the Great Officers of the Maison du Roi ("King's Household") during the Ancien Régime and Bourbon Restoration. His function was to organize all public ceremonies of the crown.

The position was created by Henri III on January 1, 1585, to relieve the Grand Master of France of part of his workload. The Grand Master of Ceremonies took his oath of office at the hands of the Grand Master of France.

The Grand Master of Ceremonies oversaw state ceremonies and not court etiquette or private functions. He played a role in ceremonies celebrating or commemorating births, baptisms, marriages, and funerals for members of the royal family, royal feasts, ambassadorial receptions, the coronation, royal entries into towns, lits de justice, meetings of the States General and important assemblies.

The duties of The Grand Master of Ceremonies were principally :

- overseeing logistics of ceremonies (materials, workers, plans, menus);
- carrying messages and convocations from the king to Parlement, the other sovereign courts or notable individuals;
- accompanying the king and the queen, or foreign sovereigns, on their travels, so as to manage the ceremonies during the trip;
- making official records of the ceremonies to serve as jurisprudence and to aid future ceremonies;
- counselling the members of the court of their role in the ceremonies, and overseeing that the ceremonies unfold properly.

In the exercise of his functions, he was assisted by a "master of ceremonies" and an aide.

The Grand Master of Ceremonies carried a baton covered in black velvet, with an ivory tip.

The position was eliminated in 1792, but was reinstated during the Bourbon Restoration.

== Grand Masters of Ceremonies ==
- 1585-1603 Guillaume Pot de Rhodes
- 1603-1616 Guillaume II Pot de Rhodes
- 1616-1622 François Pot de Rhodes
- 1622-1642 Claude Pot de Rhodes
- 1642-1666 Henri de Rhodes
- 1666-1684 Charles, marquis de Rhodes
- 1684-1701 Jules-Armand Colbert, marquis de Blainville
- 1701-1749 Thomas II, marquis de Dreux
- 1749-1755 Michel, marquis de Brézé
- 1755-1781 Joachim, marquis de Dreux
- 1804-1814 and 1815 (Hundred Days) Louis Philippe, Marquis et Comte de Ségur
- 1781-1792 & 1814-1829 Henri-Évrard, marquis de Dreux-Brézé
- 1829-1830 Scipion, marquis de Dreux-Brézé

== See also ==
- Maison du Roi
