= Pierre L'Enfant (painter) =

French painter (1704–1787)

Pierre Nicolas L'Enfant
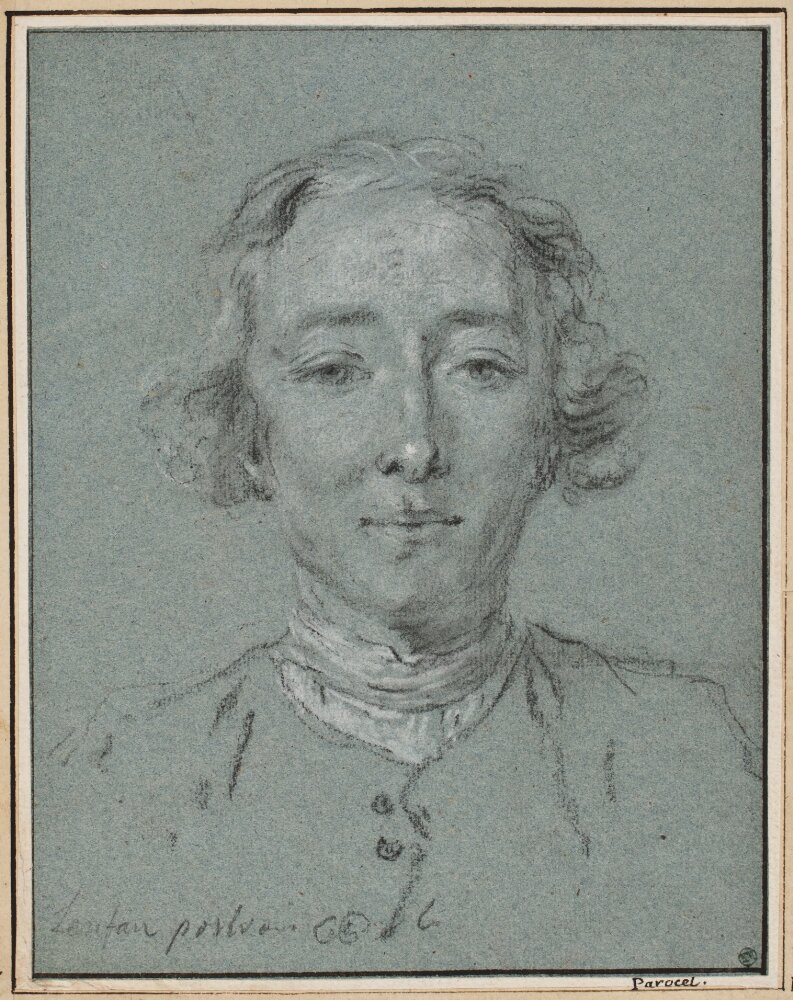
- Drawing by Charles Parrocel
- Born: August 26, 1704; Anet, France
- Died: June 23, 1787 (aged 82); Paris, France
- Education: Royal Academy of Painting and Sculpture
- Spouse: Marie Charlotte Luillier
- Children: Pierre Charles L'Enfant

Pierre L'Enfant (August 26, 1704 – June 23, 1787) was an 18th-century French artist who was known for his battle scene paintings in the court of Louis XV. He was also an instructor at the Royal Academy of Painting and Sculpture and the father of Pierre Charles, who designed the urban plan for Washington, D.C.

== Biography ==
L'Enfant was born in Anet on August 26, 1704. After studying under Charles Parrocel, he was admitted as an adémicien to the Royal Academy of Painting and Sculpture in 1745. His specialties were battle scenes and landscapes; his most famous of his paintings were those depicting the War of the Austrian Succession, especially a series of panoramas tracing the war in the Low Countries between 1744 and 1748.

He married Marie Charlotte Luillier, the daughter of a French military officer. Together, they had three children: Pierre Joseph (1752–1758) and Pierre Charles (1754–1825) and a daughter. L'Enfant was an instructor to his son while he was enrolled in the academy from 1771 to 1776. He died in the Gobelins district of Paris on June 23, 1787. L'Enfant left Pierre Charles a farm in Normandy as part of his inheritance, but his son didn't take the necessary steps to officially assume ownership and manage it.

The Palace of Versailles has four of his paintings, Prise de Menin, Siège de Fribourg, Siège de Tournai, and Siège de Mons.

== Gallery ==
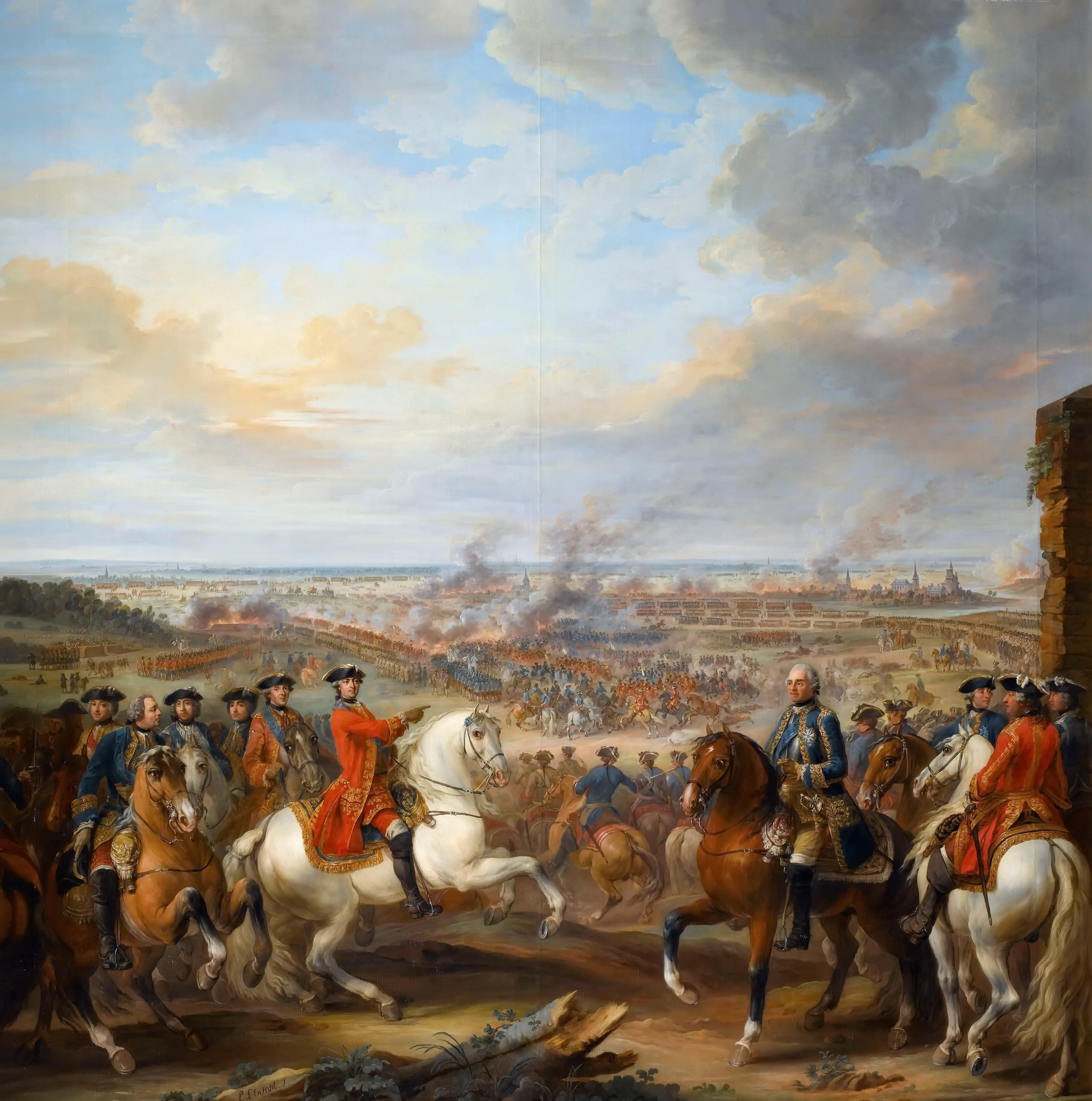
Battle of Fontenoy, 1745

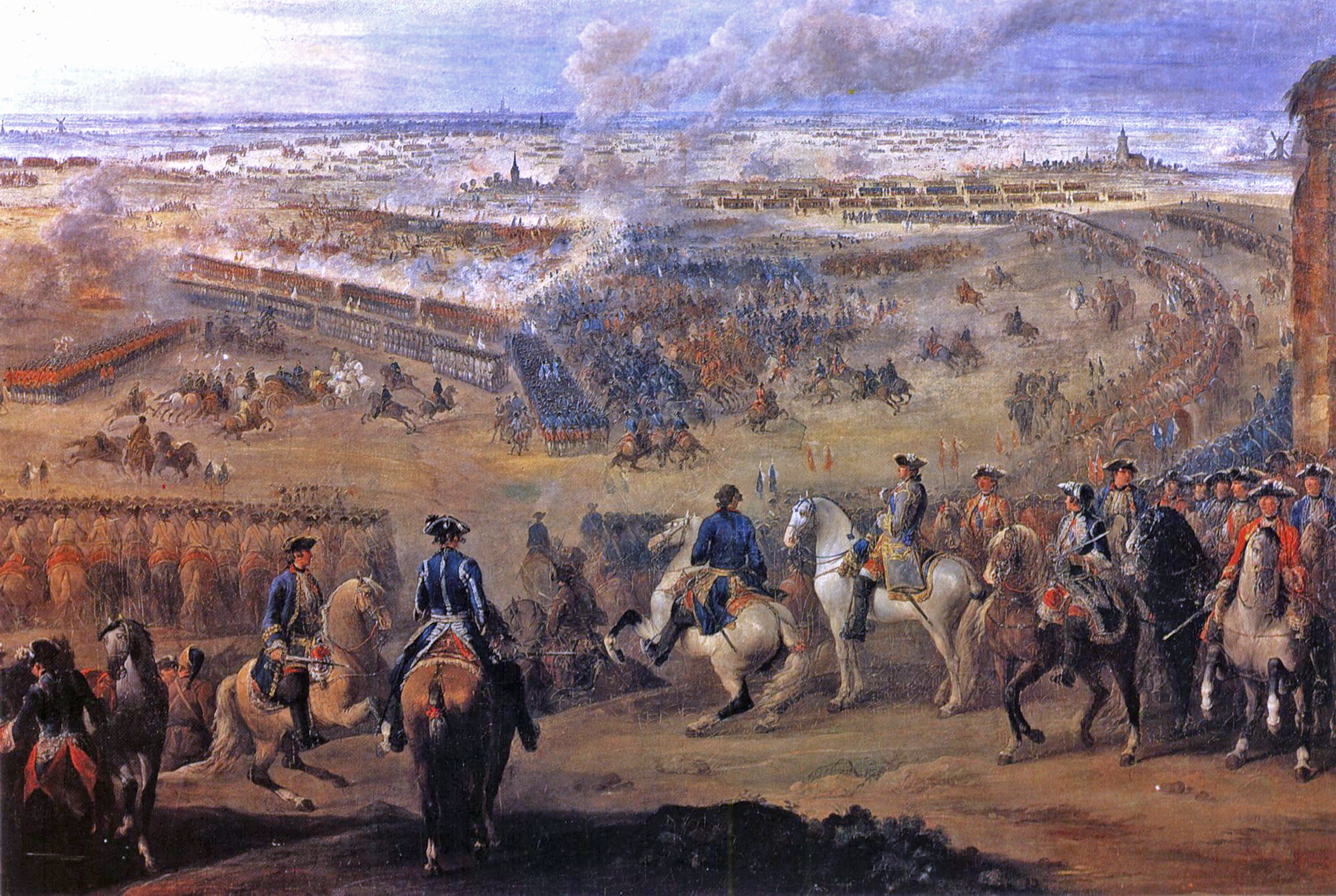
Battle of Fontenoy, 1745

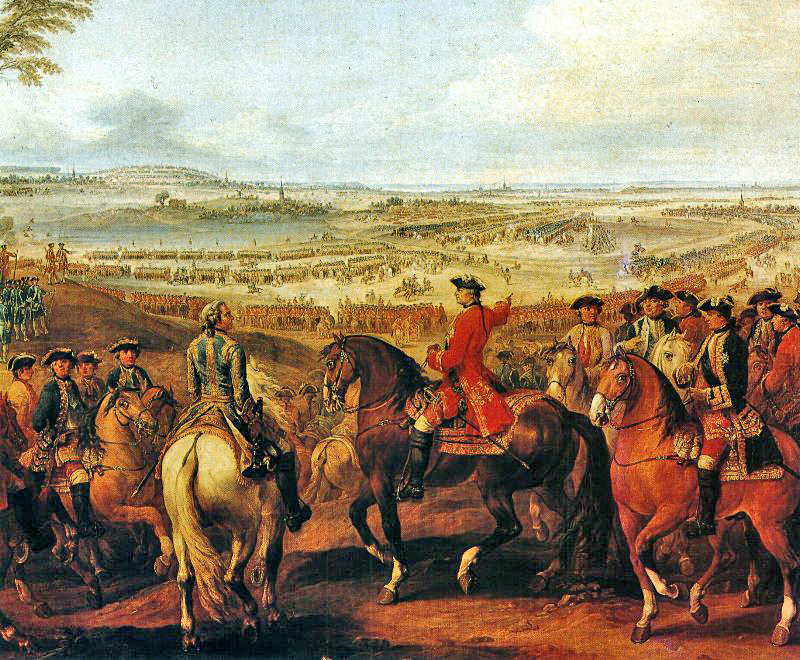
Battle of Lauffeldt, 1747

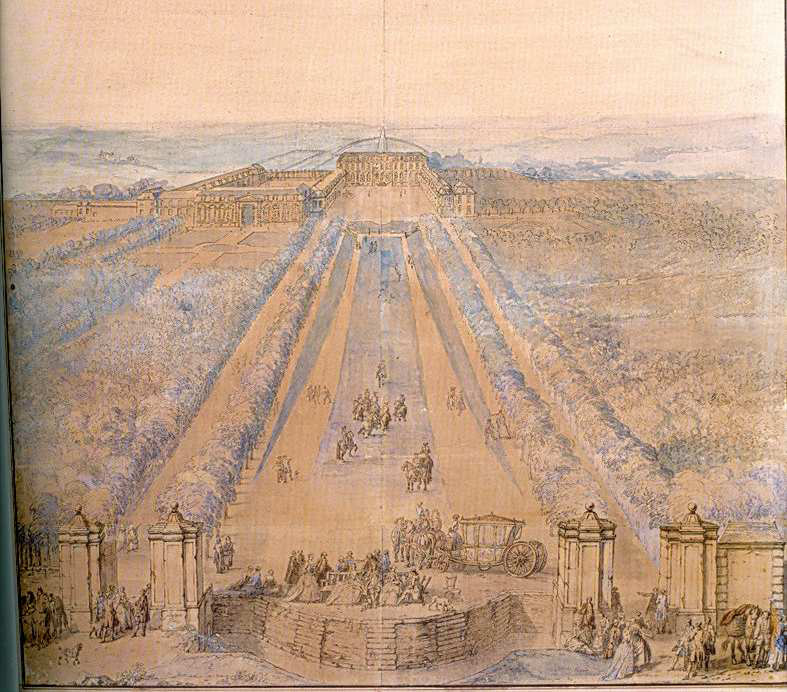
Viiew of Chanteloup taken from the gates of the Spanish route. 1762

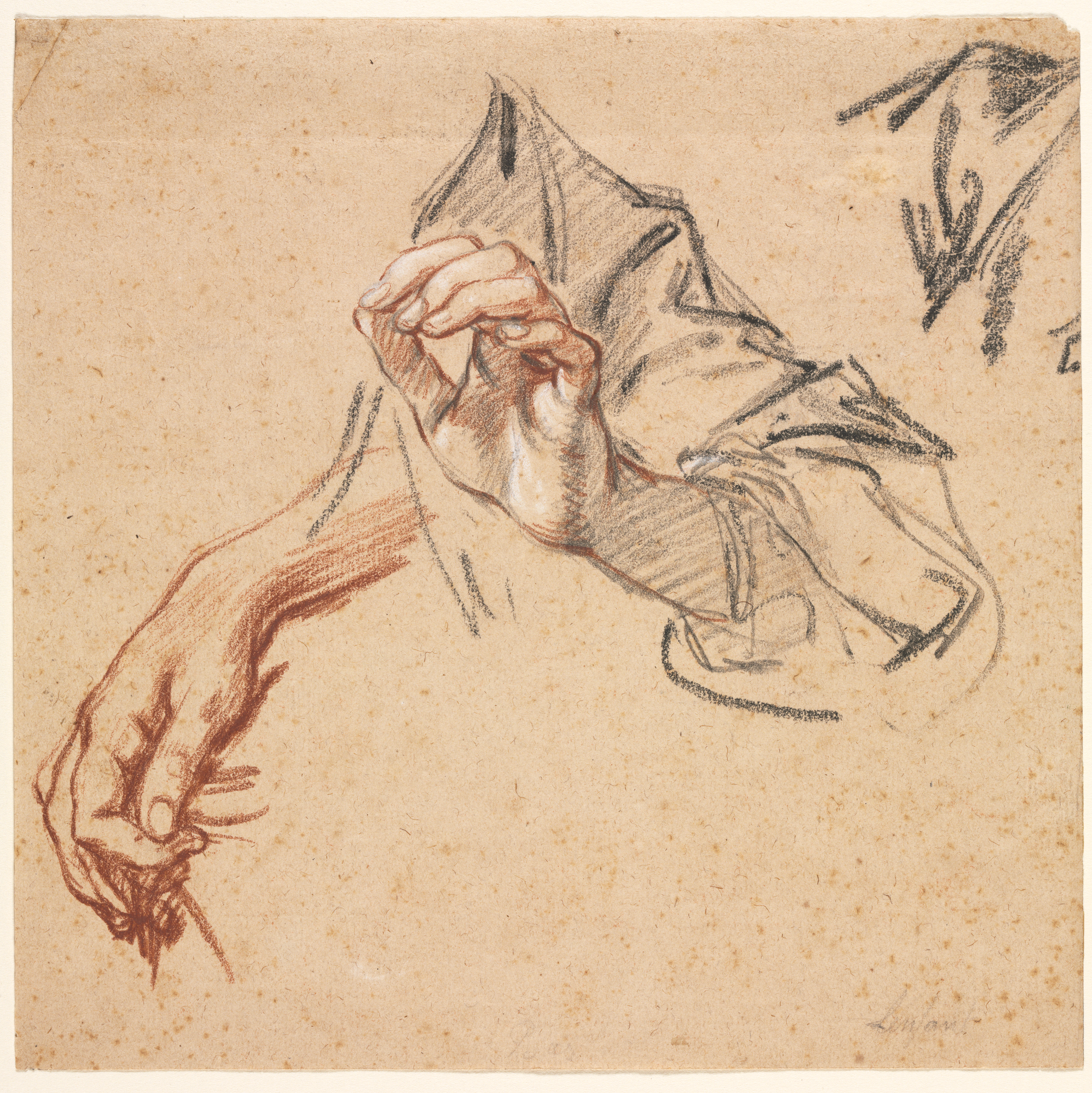
Study of Hands, Cleveland Museum of Art

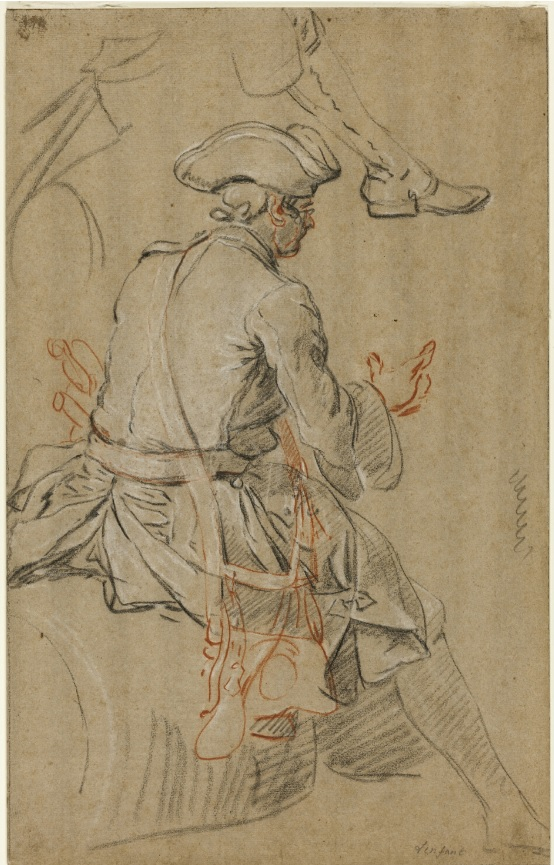
Sketch of Man on Horseback, Art Institute of Chicago
