= National Assembly (French Revolution) =

Revolutionary assembly in France from June to July 1789

National Assembly Assemblée nationale
- Kingdom of France
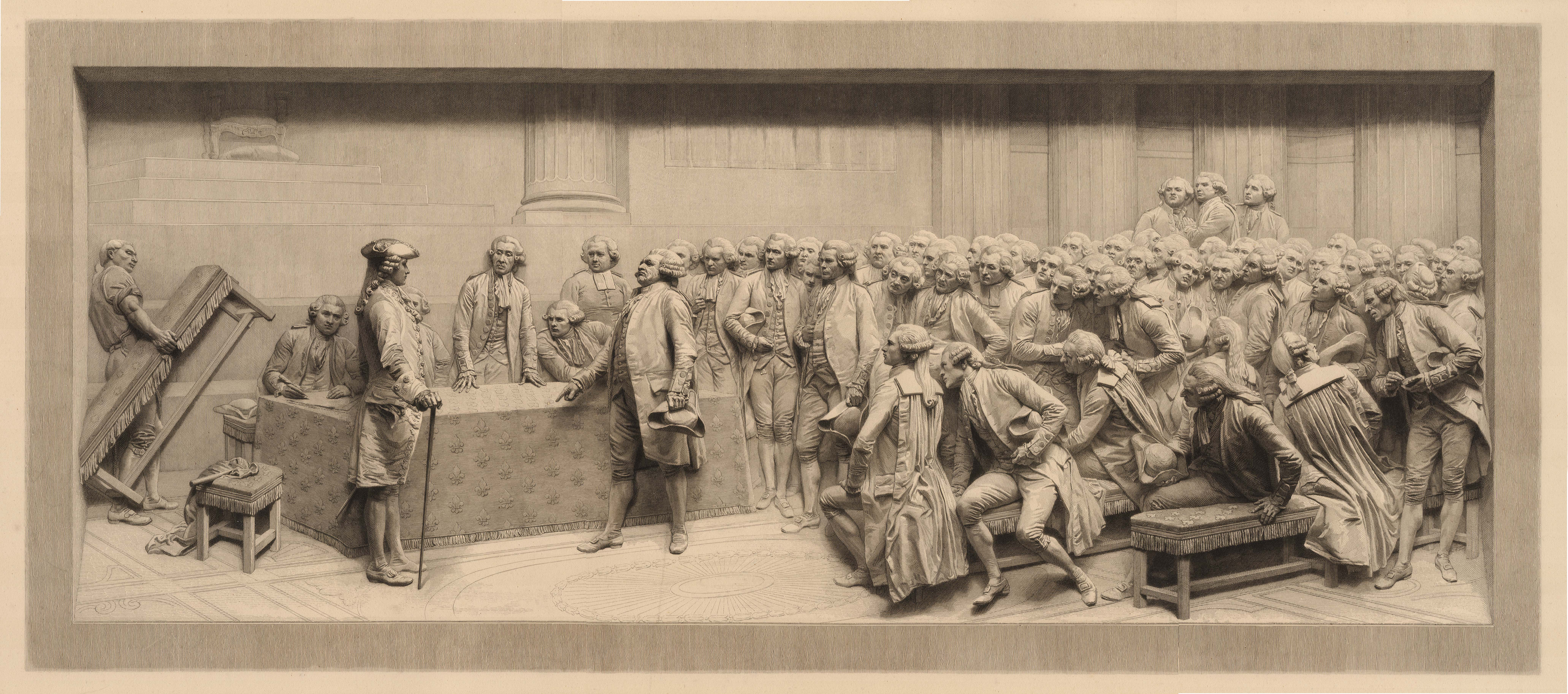
- Mirabeau's defiance in front of the marquis de Dreux-Brézé on 23 June 1789

Type
- Type: Unicameral

History
- Established: 17 June 1789
- Disbanded: 9 July 1789
- Preceded by: Estates-General of 1789
- Succeeded by: National Constituent Assembly
- Seats: 1139

During the French Revolution, the National Assembly (French: Assemblée nationale, [asɑ̃ble nɑsjɔnal]), which existed from 17 June 1789 to 9 July 1789, was a revolutionary assembly of the Kingdom of France formed by the representatives of the Third Estate (commoners) of the Estates-General and eventually joined by some members of the First and Second Estates. Thereafter (until replaced by the Legislative Assembly on 30 September 1791), it became a legislative body known as the National Constituent Assembly (Assemblée nationale constituante), although the shorter form was favored.

== Background ==
The Estates-General had been called on 5 May 1789 to manage France's financial crisis, but promptly fell to squabbling over its own structure. Its members had been elected to represent the estates of the realm: the 1st Estate (the clergy), the 2nd Estate (the nobility) and the 3rd Estate (which, in theory, represented all of the commoners and, in practice, represented the bourgeoisie). The Third Estate had been granted "double representation"—that is, twice as many delegates as each of the other feudal estates—but at the opening session on 5 May 1789 was informed that all voting would be "by power" not "by head", so the double representation would be meaningless in terms of power. They refused this and proceeded to meet separately.

Shuttle diplomacy among the estates continued without success until 27 May; on 28 May, the representatives of the 3rd Estate began to meet on their own, calling themselves the Communes ("Commons") and proceeding with their "verification of powers" independently of the other bodies; from 13 June to 17 June they were gradually joined by some of the nobles and the majority of the clergy as well as other people such as the peasants. On 17 June this group began to call itself the National Assembly.

== The King resists ==
Jacques Necker, finance minister of Louis XVI, had earlier proposed that the king hold a Séance Royale (Royal Session) in an attempt to reconcile the divided Estates. The king agreed; but none of the three orders were formally notified of the decision to hold a Royal Session. All debates were to be put on hold until the séance royale took place.

Events soon overtook Necker's complex scheme of giving in to the Communes on some points while holding firm on others. No longer interested in Necker's advice, Louis XVI, under the influence of the courtiers of his privy council, resolved to go in state to the Assembly, annul its decrees, command the separation of the orders, and dictate the reforms to be effected by the restored Estates-General. On 19 June he ordered the Salle des États, the hall where the National Assembly met, closed, and remained at Marly for several days while he prepared his address.

== Confrontation and recognition ==
Two days later, also deprived of use of the tennis court that they had been using as an improvised meeting place, the National Assembly met in the Church of Saint Louis, where the majority of the representatives of the clergy joined them: efforts to restore the old order had served only to accelerate events. When, on 23 June in accord with his plan, the king finally addressed the representatives of all three estates, he encountered a stony silence. He concluded by ordering all to disperse. The nobles and clergy obeyed; the deputies of the common people remained seated in a silence finally broken by Mirabeau, whose speech culminated, "A military force surrounds the assembly! Where are the enemies of the nation? Is Catiline at our gates? I demand, investing yourselves with your dignity, with your legislative power, you inclose yourselves within the religion of your oath. It does not permit you to separate till you have formed a constitution." The deputies stood firm.

Necker, conspicuous by his absence from the royal party on that day, found himself in disgrace with Louis, but back in the good graces of the National Assembly. Those of the clergy who had joined the Assembly at the church of Saint Louis remained in the Assembly; forty-seven members of the nobility, including the Duke of Orléans, soon joined them; by 27 June the royal party had overtly given in, although the likelihood of a military counter-coup remained in the air. The French military began to arrive in large numbers around Paris and Versailles.

=== Royal session of 23 June 1789 ===
In the séance royale of 23 June the King granted a Charte octroyée, a constitution granted of the royal favour, which affirmed, subject to the traditional limitations, the right of separate deliberation for the three orders, which constitutionally formed three chambers. This move failed; soon that part of the deputies of the nobles who still stood apart, joined the National Assembly at the request of the king. The Estates-General had ceased to exist, having become the National Assembly (and after 9 July 1789, the National Constituent Assembly), though these bodies consisted of the same deputies elected by the separate orders.

== Reconstitution ==
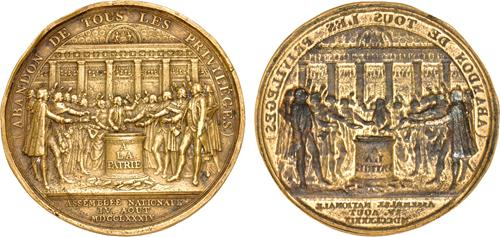
"The National Assembly Abolishes Feudalism". Medal created by Jacques-Édouard Gatteaux, dated 4 August 1789

Messages of support poured into the Assembly from Paris and other French cities. On 9 July 1789, the Assembly, reconstituting itself as the National Constituent Assembly, addressed the king in polite but firm terms, requesting the removal of the troops (which now included foreign regiments, who showed far greater obedience to the king than did his French troops), but Louis declared that he alone could judge the need for troops, and assured them that the troops had deployed strictly as a precautionary measure. Louis "offered" to move the assembly to Noyon or Soissons: that is to say, to place it between two armies and deprive it of the support of the Parisian people. Public outrage over this troop presence precipitated the Storming of the Bastille, beginning the next phase of the Revolution.

== See also ==
- List of members of the National Constituent Assembly of 1789
