= Estates General of 1789 =

Consultative assembly of France, summoned by Louis XVI

Type
- Type: Unicameral assembly of the Estates General of Louis XVI

History
- Founded: May 5, 1789
- Disbanded: June 27, 1789
- Preceded by: Estates General of 1614
- Succeeded by: National Assembly

Leadership
- Grand Master of Ceremonies: Henri-Évrard de Dreux-Brézé
- Chamber of the Nobility: Philippe-Claude de Montboissier-Beaufort-Canillac; Anne Charles Sigismond de Montmorency-Luxembourg
- Chamber of the Clergy: Dominique de La Rochefoucauld
- Third Estate: Charles Florimond Leroux (6–22 May); Jean-Étienne Menu de Chomorceau (22 May – 1 June); Michel-François d'Ailly (1–3 June); Jean Sylvain Bailly (3 June – 3 July)

Structure
- Seats: 1139 deputies
- Political groups: Third Estate (611) Clergy (302) Noblesse (289)

Meeting place
- Hôtel des Menus Plaisirs (closed 20 June); Salle du Jeu de paume

The Estates General of 1789 (French: États Généraux de 1789) was a general assembly representing the French estates of the realm: the clergy (First Estate), the nobility (Second Estate), and the commoners (Third Estate). Summoned by King Louis XVI, it opened on 5 May 1789 at Versailles, marking the first such meeting since 1614. The assembly was a desperate attempt to resolve a catastrophic fiscal crisis. Previous attempts at structural reform, including a universal land tax, had been blocked by the Assembly of Notables and the Parlements. These bodies claimed that only the Estates General possessed the authority to approve new taxes. The Estates General ultimately failed due to a fundamental deadlock over voting procedures. The First and Second Estates sought to vote by estate to preserve their tax exemptions and political dominance. Conversely, the Third Estate demanded voting by head to reflect their numerical majority. This procedural dispute paralyzed the body for six weeks, preventing any progress on the financial crisis. The failure became definitive when the Third Estate broke away to declare itself the National Assembly on 17 June 1789.

== Background ==
=== Assembly of Notables ===
As a result of the financial support given to the Americans during the war against Great Britain, the amount totaled 1.25 billion livres, and France was heavily in debt. For a total income of 475 million livres, the annual deficit was some 150 million. In 1789, Calonne informed the king that increasing taxes would be impossible, that continued borrowing would be disastrous, and that merely cutting expenses would be inadequate. He added that the only way to bring real order to the finances would be to revitalise the entire state by reforming everything that was defective in its constitution. Calonne did not want the Parlements involved due to their opposing stance. He preferred an assembly of notables, as they were only the most important and enlightened magnates of the realm to whom the king could communicate his views and from whom he sought their opinions. Calonne received little cooperation from the assembly as his reforms included a land tax, which was rejected by the nobility within the assembly. Étienne Charles de Loménie de Brienne, president of the Assembly of Notables, succeeded Calonne as the Controller-General of Finances. Frustrated by his inability to obtain money, he required 240 million livres in short-term advances budgeted for 1788, the king ordered Brienne on 25 May to dissolve the Assembly. Their proposals reverted to the Parlement.

=== Rebellion of the parlements ===
Turning again to the parlements, the king found that they were inclined to continue the issues that had been raised in the Assembly of Notables. The proper legal function of the parlements, besides giving advice to the king, was only to register or record the king's edicts as law unless the registered edicts were not lawful. On 6 July 1787, Brienne forwarded the Subvention Territoriale (land tax) and the edit du timbre, (stamp act), for registration. On 6 August, the king ordered the Parlement to assemble at Versailles, where Louis held a Lit de justice to register the taxes. On 7 August, back in Paris, the Parlement declared the registration illegal and the lit de justice null and void, calling for the Estates General to assemble.

Following the arrest of some leading magistrates on 15 August, the king exiled the Parlement from Paris to Troyes. When negotiations with the Parlement were at a deadlock, Louis XVI was forced to give in. On 19 September, Louis XVI agreed to withdraw the Edict of the land tax and promised to convene the Estates-General in 1792, and the Parlement returned to Paris. No longer able to rely on revenue from the land tax, Brienne was forced to propose a loan of 420 million livres before Parlement on 19 November. The rejection of the registration led to the exile of the Duke of Orléans and the arrest of two magistrates. In May 1788, Louis XVI and his ministers Brienne and Lamoignon attempted to limit the Parlements to judicial duties by creating a royal plenary court for political acts. On 3 May, the Parlement responded with a declaration of fundamental laws that rejected arbitrary arrests and stated that only the Estates-General could authorize new taxes.

Two days later, the King annulled this declaration and ordered the arrest of Duval d'Éprémesnil and Goislard de Monsabert, who were eventually taken after a thirty-hour resistance within the Parlement walls. During a lit de justice on 8 May, the King enacted reforms that transferred parlementary powers to forty-seven new courts of appeal and the Plenary court. He argued that a single king required a single law and a single register, subsequently suspending all Parlements. This move led to widespread provincial opposition, including the Day of the Tiles in Grenoble and an unauthorized assembly in Vizille that called for an institutional change where the Third Estate would have doubled representation.

The King found it impossible to establish the Plenary court as several peers refused to participate and civil unrest increased. By 8 August 1788, the King and Brienne cancelled the Plenary court and scheduled the Estates-General for the following May. Following Brienne's resignation on 24 August, the King reappointed Necker as Director-General of Finance, who restored the Parlements to their previous status. However, the Parlement of Paris lost its public standing in September by demanding that the Estates-General follow the 1614 format, which restricted the influence of commoners. Although the Assembly of Notables supported this traditional format in November, the King chose to support the Third Estate's demand for doubled representation. By 5 December 1788, the King informed the parlementarians that he would no longer consult them, preferring to seek measures for the state through the National Assembly.

== Convening ==
=== Edict of 24 January 1789 ===
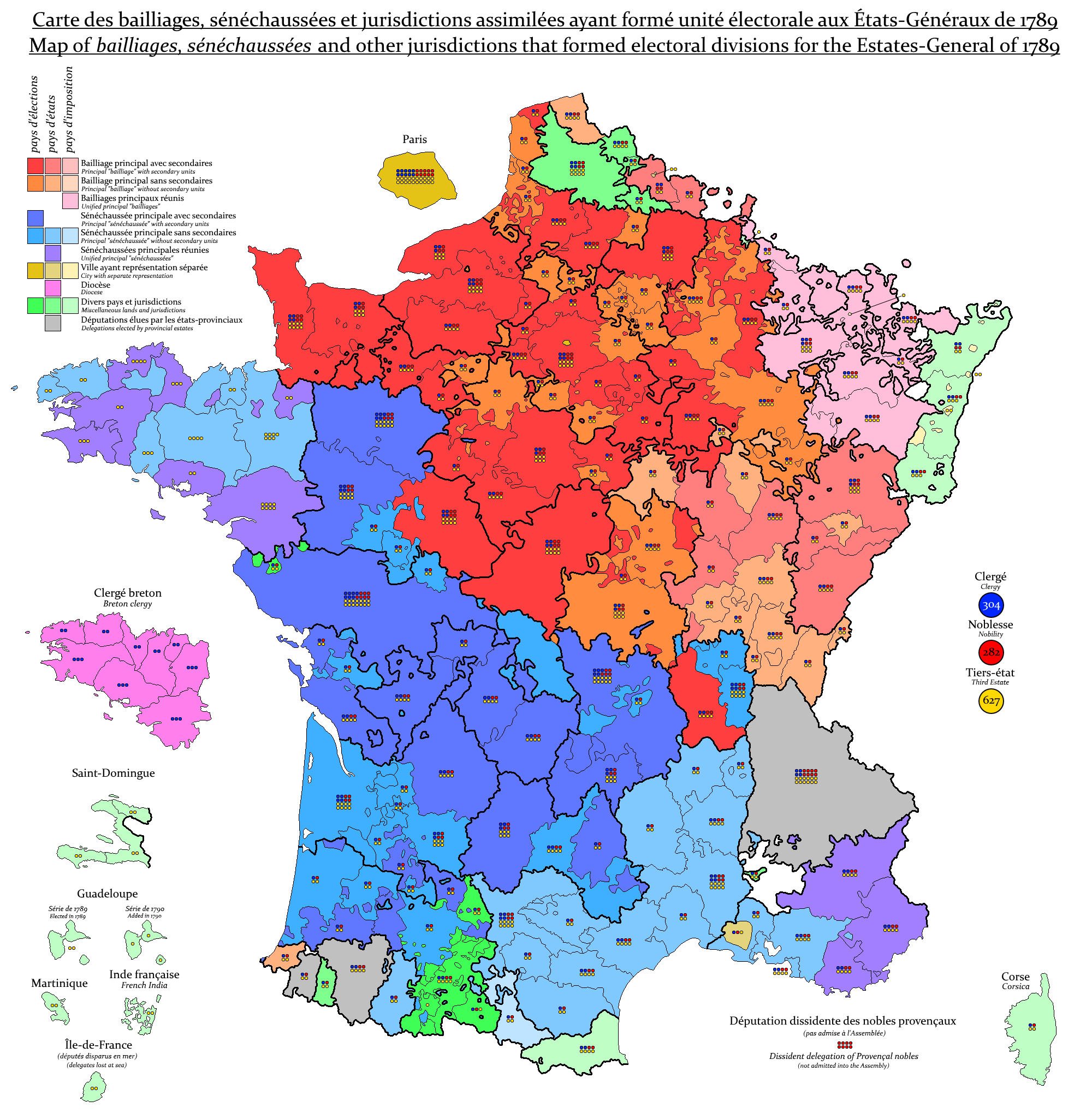
Map of the electoral divisions

The Estates-General were summoned by a royal edict dated 24 January 1789.

Nous avons besoin du concours de nos fidèles Sujets, pour nous aider à surmonter toutes les difficultés où nous nous trouvons relativement à l'état de nos finances .... Ces grands motifs nous ont déterminés à convoquer l'assemblée des États de toutes les Provinces de notre obéissance...We have need of a concourse of our faithful subjects, to assist us surmount all the difficulties we find relative to the state of our finances... These great motives have resolved us to convoke the assemblée des États of all the provinces under our authority ....

— Louis XVI,

=== Elections ===
The electoral system used in 1789 was complex. Basic constituencies were to be the ancient bailliage and sénéchaussée judicial districts. To ensure rough parity of size and population, however, smaller bailliages and sénéchaussées were amalgamated while Bordeaux, Marseille, Nantes, Amiens, Lille, Lyon, Rouen and Paris were granted separate representation. With these exceptions, there was to be an electoral assembly for each order in each of the 234 constituencies. Nobles with full transmissible titles were eligible to participate in the noble assemblies, whilst beneficed clergymen were entitled to participate in their own assemblies. Due to the sheer size of the Third Estate, indirect representation was required. Thus, every male taxpayer over the age of 25 had the right to attend a primary assembly. Two delegates were chosen from every hundred households to sit in the assembly that elected the final third-estate deputies.

The number of deputies was 1,219 in total: 302 for the First Estate, 289 for the Second Estate and 611 for the Third Estate. The actual number of deputies who in fact sat was 1,208: 299 for the First Estate, 278 for the Second Estate and 609 for the Third Estate. The First Estate represented 115,000 to 150,000 Catholic clergy, less than 1 per cent of the population. Three-fourths of the delegates from the First Estate were ordinary parish priests. The remaining First Estate deputies held a variety of clerical positions. Of these, 46 were prelates, including 34 bishops, 10 archbishops and two episcopal coadjutors. The 27 other members of the upper clergy were closely associated with the episcopal contingent and included vicars-general, a retired bishop, an agent-general of the Clergy of France, three conseillers clercs attached to the sovereign courts, and an abbé commendataire linked to the royal ministry (the Oratorian academician Maury). The group of 26 canons, ecclesiastical teachers, and non-parish regulars completed the clerical estate.

The Second Estate represented the nobility, about 120,000 to 400,000 men and women who owned about 25 to 30 percent of the land. Primarily drawn from the elite of the traditional aristocracy, the deputies of the Second Estate included four princes of the blood, sixteen dukes (nine of whom were peers of the realm), eighty-three marquesses, one hundred and four counts or viscounts, and twenty-eight barons. Nearly three-quarters of nobles overall belonged to this category, compared to just two to six per cent of titled nobles on the provincial tax rolls of the kingdom. Moreover, a large proportion of these aristocrats lived in towns, particularly in Paris. Only a minority of these Parisian noble deputies were 'courtiers', with ties and responsibilities at the royal court in Versailles.

Just nine were listed in the official almanac, not including the King's cousin, the Duke of Orléans, and six other dukes and peers who had immediate access to the king's inner circle. However, many others undoubtedly attended court functions and socialised with one another in Paris. A quarter of the Second Estate deputies came from the medium to large provincial towns of the kingdom, joining the large contingent of Parisian aristocrats. Some of these were undoubtedly military officers stationed with their regiments or serving as local commanders or governors. Others were retired officers living among the prosperous regional nobility, dividing their time between rural estates and townhouses in provincial capitals. Overall, only a fifth to a quarter of the deputies were nobles from the provinces.

The Third Estate representation was doubled, representing about 98 percent of the population of roughly 28 million. Half were well-educated lawyers or local officials. Nearly a third were in trades or industry; 51 were wealthy landowners. None of them were craftsmen or shopkeepers, and only two of them identified themselves as peasants through their clothing: the Bretons Michel Gérard and Corentin Le Floc'h. A minimum of fifty-eight of the Third Estate delegates held some form of hereditary or personal nobility. While this was well below the 25–45 per cent of nobles in the Third Estate in 1614, it still represented almost one in twelve of the Commons' members. Some of these deputies came from prominent and ancient aristocratic families: Mirabeau, the Comte de Chambord and the Marquis de Rostaing, who presided over the Nobility order in Montbrison before being elected by the Third Estate of the same bailliage. The majority of Third Estate nobles, however, had been ennobled recently, were in the process of being ennobled, or held various forms of 'temporary' nobility.Some clergy were also elected as Third Estate delegates, most notably the abbé Sieyès.

The Règlement that went out by post in January thus specified separate voting for delegates of each estate. Each tax district (cities, boroughs, and parishes) would elect their own delegates to the Third Estate. The Bailliages, or judicial districts, would elect delegates to the First and Second Estates in separate ballots. The election rules differed somewhat depending on the type of voting unit, whether city, parish, or some other. Generally, the distribution of delegates was by population: the most populous locations had the greatest number of delegates. Paris was thus dominant. The electorate consisted of males 25 years and older, property owners, and registered taxpayers. They could be native or naturalized citizens.

Each voting assembly would also collect a cahier de doléances (notebook of grievances) to be considered by the convocation. Across all three Estates, there was general agreement that the fiscal crisis was the result of the inefficiency and wastefulness of the king's ministers and the Estates-General should become a regular assembly, creating a parliamentary regime. The cahiers expressed agreement that the Church was in urgent need of reform to improve the position of the parish clergy and to check abuses, such as multiple office-holding and absenteeism among its elite. People across the social spectrum urged the Estates-General to undertake reform of the legal system, to achieve greater uniformity, humanity and efficiency.

The Third Estate pushed for an equal distribution of tax burdens and the principle of careers being open to talent rather than determined by birth. In contrast, many nobles wanted to maintain their social status and resisted the removal of seigneurial rights. Rural populations specifically targeted the seigneurial system, including monopolies over mills and ovens, unpaid labor, and the exclusion of commoners from hunting. Peasants also focused on the unfairness of noble and clerical tax exemptions. Economic differences emerged between various groups as well, with workers and some villagers calling for the removal of machinery to prevent competition, while manufacturers sought a national free market with fewer trade barriers. The political deadlock over whether to vote by head or by order remained a major obstacle despite the optimistic tone of many documents. Despite their lively expression of regional difference, most rural people spoke Breton, Basque, Flemish or Occitan, in daily life or lived in provinces such as Lorraine or Roussillon only recently incorporated into the kingdom, their cahiers communicated an assumption of French citizenship within a regenerated kingdom.

=== Opening of the convention ===
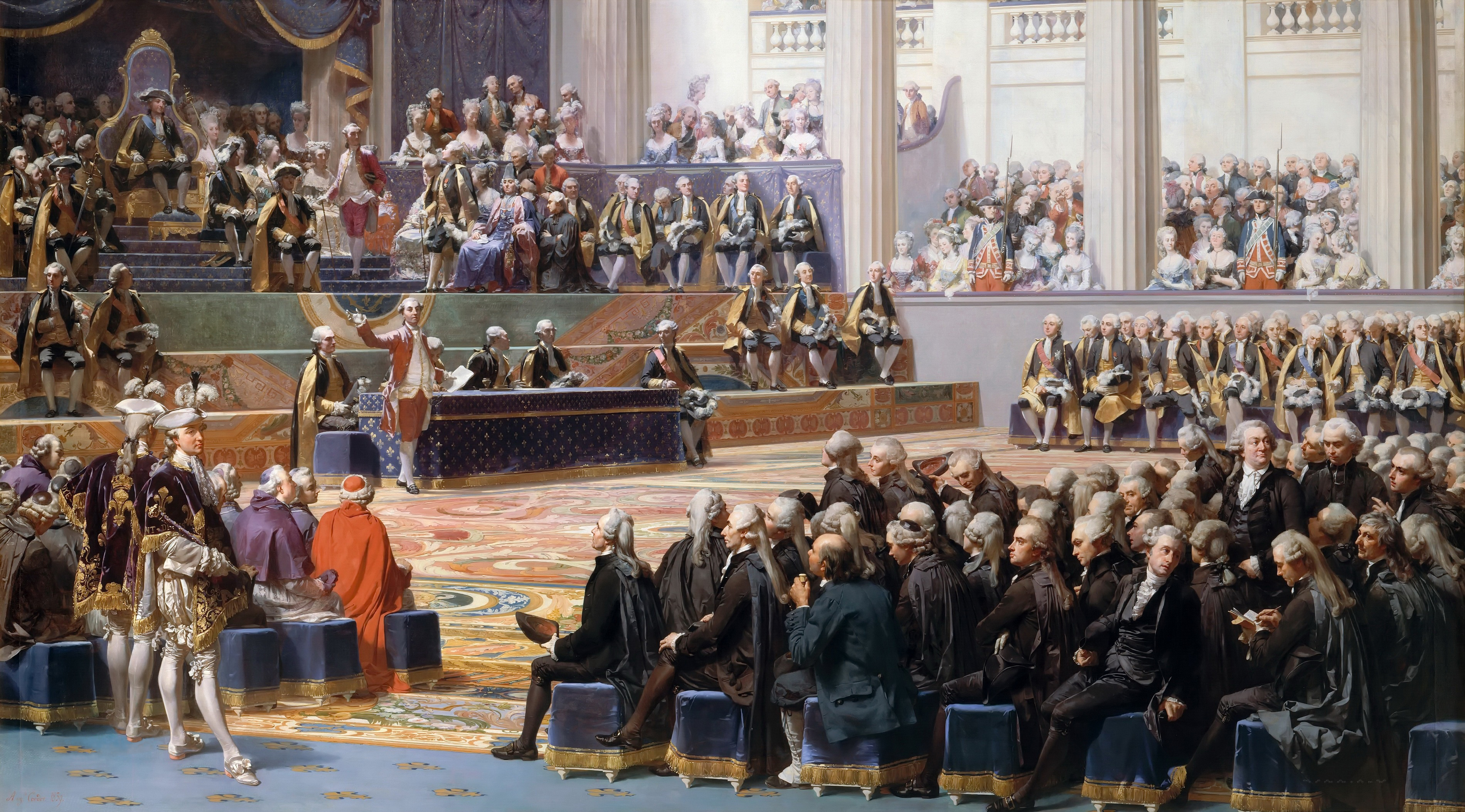
Opening session of the General Assembly, 5 May 1789, by Auguste Couder (1839) shows the inauguration of the Estates-General in Versailles

After a grand procession on 4 May, the deputies met all together at the Menus Plaisirs the next day for the king to arrive. Louis XVI arrived at midday, taking his seat at one end of the hall, already occupied by the deputies, on a dais carpeted in violet interspersed with gold fleurs-de-lys. He was followed by the queen, Marie Antoinette, the other members of the royal family, the principal officers of the royal household and the keeper of the seals, who arranged themselves around the steps of the throne. The king then turned to the deputies for his opening speech:

Messieurs, le jour que mon cœur attendait depuis si longtemps est enfin arrivé, et je me trouve entouré des représentants de la nation que j'ai l'honneur de commander.

Un long intervalle s'est écoulé depuis la dernière réunion des États généraux, et bien que la pratique des assemblées semblait être tombée en désuétude, je n'ai pas hésité à rétablir une coutume dont le royaume pourrait tirer une nouvelle force et qui pourrait ouvrir à la nation une nouvelle source de bonheur...

Gentlemen, the day my heart has long awaited has finally arrived, and I see myself surrounded by the representatives of the nation which it is my glory to command. A long interval has elapsed since the last meeting of the Estates General, and although the practice of holding assemblies seemed to have fallen into disuse, I have not hesitated to reestablish a custom from which the kingdom may gain new strength and which may open up for the nation a new source of happiness . . .

— Louis XVI,

When the king had finished his speech, the Minister of Finance followed suit. In his speech, which would last 2 hours, he mentioned a 56 million deficit, which actually was three times that sum but made no remark of the floating debt. The only remedy he proposed was a new tax. Necker made clear to the deputies that the convening of the Estates General was by no means a consequence of the deficit, but rather a result of the king's goodwill. He then advised the representatives of the nobility and the clergy to willingly renounce their financial privileges, but not to collaborate with the Third Estate. He neither mentioned the Constitution nor gave the assembly any guidelines or a work plan.

== Proceedings and dissolution ==
The deputies expressed disappointment, feeling that the Crown was treating them just like their predecessors of 1614, ignoring the very nature of the mandate they had received from their electors. Necker found himself in a difficult position; his attempt to maintain a neutral stance ultimately backfired. By failing to take a firm side, he alienated the nobility and clergy while simultaneously frustrating the Third Estate, which had previously viewed him as their primary advocate. Consequently, his motives became a subject of suspicion for all parties involved.

Paralysed with no guidelines or a work plan, the First and Second Estates proceeded to the Chambre du Clergé and the Chambre de la Noblesse respectively whilst the Third Estate, due to its size, remained where it was. This physical separation mirrored a political divide; on 6 May, the Second Estate voted 188 to 46 to refuse to join the Third Estate for a common verification of credentials. Influenced by delegates from Dauphiné and Brittany, the Third Estate refused to organize as a separate order. Instead, they began to call themselves the Commons (les communes), asserting that they represented the French nation as a whole. The stalemate continued until 12 June, when the Third Estate formally invited the upper orders to join them. Following a motion by the Abbé Sieyès on 17 June, the deputies voted 491 to 89 to adopt the title National Assembly.

They also proclaimed that the interpretation and presentation of the general will would be its responsibility. They confirmed that the power to consent to taxation would also belong to it, thereby provisionally approving existing taxes. They then invited the other orders to join them but made it clear that they intended to conduct the nation's affairs with or without them.

Louis had no intention of approving them. The Dauphin had died on June 4, and the king had withdrawn to Marly, where the queen and royal princes instructed him. On the advice of the courtiers of his privy council, he resolved to go in state to the assembly, annul its decrees, command the separation of the orders, and dictate the reforms to be effected by the restored Estates General. On 20 June he ordered the hall where the National Assembly met to be closed. The assembly then went in search of a building large enough to hold them, taking their deliberations to the nearby tennis court, where they proceeded to swear the "Tennis Court Oath", agreeing not to disband until they had settled the constitution of France. Two days later, deprived of the use of the tennis court as well, the assembly met in the Church of Saint Louis, where the majority of the representatives of the clergy joined them: efforts to restore the old order had served only to accelerate events.

Necker advised a royal session and suggested reforms such as equal taxation and opening public offices to all citizens. He also recommended a legislative system with two houses where the king held a veto. Louis postponed the session until June 23. On June 21, Louis included his brothers in his council and rejected Necker's proposals. At the session on June 23, soldiers surrounded the meeting place. The king announced that the Estates-General would have the power to approve taxes and that individual liberties and press freedom would be protected. He allowed the orders to deliberate together on general matters but kept the three-order system for issues related to social hierarchy and religious organization. Louis ordered the groups to separate and threatened to end the assembly if they did not comply. The Third Estate stayed in the hall after the king and the nobility departed. Members like Bailly and Sieyes stated that the assembly did not take orders, and Mirabeau declared they would stay unless removed by force. By June 27, the king told the nobility and clergy to join the Third Estate as opposition to the Commons decreased.

== Bibliography ==
- Baker, Keith M. (15 May 1987). John W. Boyer; Julius Kirshner (eds.). The Old Regime and the French Revolution. University of Chicago Readings in Western Civilization. Vol. 7. University of Chicago Press. ISBN 978-0-226-06950-0.
- Bordonove, Georges (1989). Louis XVI : Le Roi-Martyr. Paris: Marabout. ISBN 2-501-01173-2.
- Bosher, J.F. (1988). The French Revolution. New York: W.W. Norton. ISBN 0-3930-2588-8.
- Carlyle, Thomas (1902). The French Revolution: a History. New York: Thomas Nelson and Sons.
- Doyle, William (1990). The Oxford History of the French Revolution. Oxford: Oxford University Press. ISBN 978-0-19-285221-2.
- Egret, Jean (1977). The French Prerevolution, 1787-1788. Chicago: University of Chicago Press. ISBN 0-226-19142-7.
- Hanson, Paul R. (2004). Historical Dictionary of the French Revolution. Lanham: Scarecrow Press. ISBN 0-810-85052-4.
- Labot, A. (1866). Convocation des États-Géneraux Législation Électorale de 1789. Nevers: S. Gourdet.
- Lefebvre, Georges; et al. (The French Revolution: Conflicting Interpretations) (1983). A Series of Class Revolts. Malabar: Krieger. ISBN 0-898-74517-9.
- McPhee, Peter (2016). Liberty or Death : the French Revolution, 1789-1799. New Haven: Yale University Press. ISBN 978-0-300-18993-3.
- Neely, Sylvia (2008). A concise history of the French Revolution. Lanham, Maryland: Rowman & Littlefield. ISBN 978-0-742-53410-0.
- Patrick, Alison; et al. (The Rise and Fall of the French Revolution) (1996). The Second Estate in the Constituent Assembly 1789-1791. Chicago: University of Chicago Press. ISBN 0-226-05691-0.
- Price, Munro (2003). The fall of the French monarchy: Louis XVI, Marie Antoinette and the Baron de Breteuil. London: Pan. ISBN 0-330-48827-9.
- Schwab, Gail M.; Jeanneney, John R. (1995). The French Revolution of 1789 and Its Impact. Greenwood. ISBN 978-0-313-29339-9.
- Soboul, Albert (1975). The French Revolution, 1787-1799: From the Storming of the Bastille to Napoleon. Random House. ISBN 978-0-394-47392-5.
- Tackett, Timothy (1996a). Becoming a Revolutionary: The Deputies of the French National Assembly and the Emergence of a Revolutionary Culture (1789-1790). Princeton: Princeton University Press. ISBN 0-691-04384-1.
- Tackett, Timothy; et al. (The Rise and Fall of the French Revolution) (1996b). The West in France 1789. Chicago: University of Chicago Press. ISBN 0-226-05691-0.
- Vincent, Bernard (2006). Louis XVI. Paris: Gallimard. ISBN 2-0703-0749-2.
