= Fort Knokke =

Fortification in western Flanders

- Lo-Reninge, Belgium

Site information
- Type: Vauban-type fort
- Controlled by: Spain 1584–1668; France 1668–1713; Dutch Republic 1713–c. 1750 (Habsburg monarchy) Austria c. 1750–1781

Location
- Coordinates: 50.98°N 2.80444°E

Site history
- Built: 1584
- Materials: Earth and brick
- Battles/wars: Nine Years' War (1695); War of Spanish Succession (1712); War of Austrian Succession (1744)

Fort Knokke or Fort de Cnocke or Fort de la Knocque or Fort de Knocke was an important fortification that defended western Flanders from the 1580s until it was demolished in the 1780s. During its 200 year history, the place was held by the Spanish Empire, Kingdom of France, Habsburg Austria and the Dutch Republic. The existing defenses were improved in 1678 by the famous military engineer Sébastien Le Prestre de Vauban. The fort was attacked by the Grand Alliance in 1695 during the Nine Years' War but the French garrison successfully held out. It was captured from the French by a ruse in 1712 during the War of the Spanish Succession. Control of the fort and other strong places in the Austrian Netherlands was a key feature of the so-called Barrier Treaty in 1713. The French captured the fort after a two-month siege in 1744 during the War of the Austrian Succession. Emperor Joseph II had the citadel demolished in 1781. The site is on the Yser River about 8 kilometres (5 mi) southwest of Diksmuide, Belgium.

== Geography ==
The site of Fort Knokke is at the confluence of the Yser River and the Ypres Canal (Ieperlee) in the municipality of Lo-Reninge. It is approximately 17 kilometres (11 mi) northwest of Ypres. At the location, a draw bridge (Knokkebrug) spans the Yser a few meters below the junction of the two streams. The trace of the one-time fort can still be clearly seen on a satellite image.

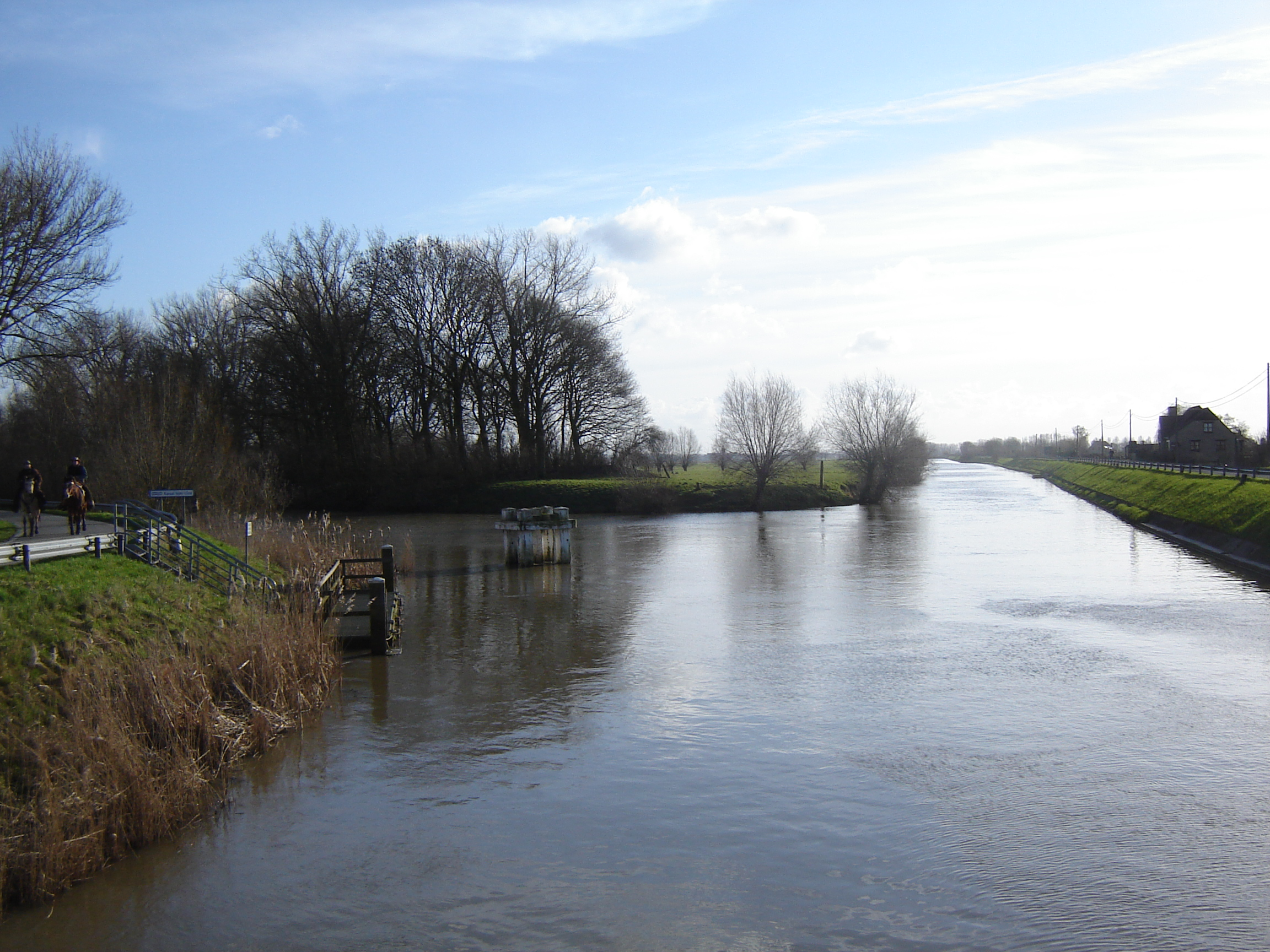
The Ypres Canal flows into the Yser at the left. The view is from the bridge looking southwest. The wedge of land between the streams is the site of the citadel.

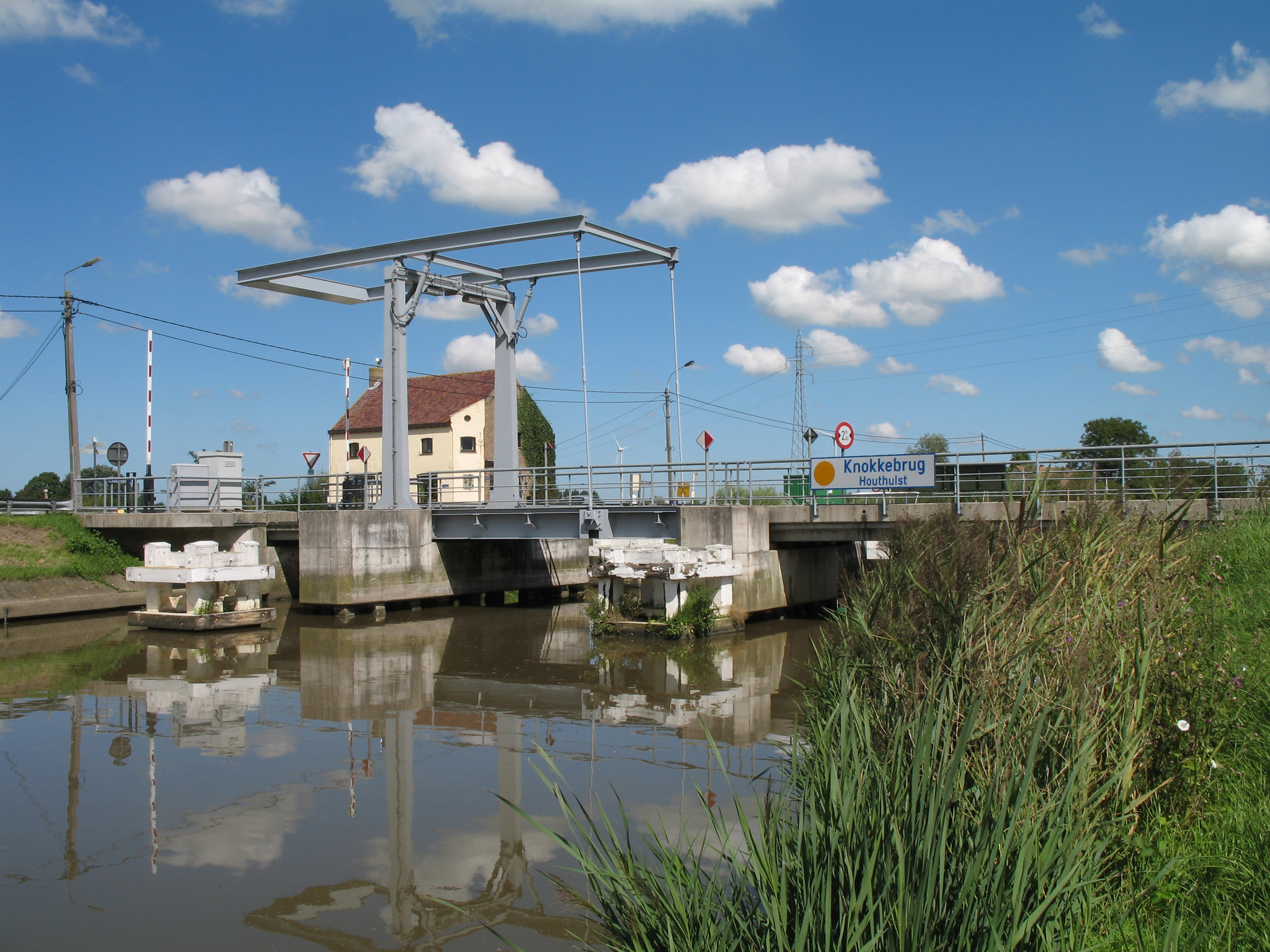
The Knokkebrug carries east-west traffic across the Yser. The modern draw bridge is located at the northern limit of the former fort's defenses.

== History ==
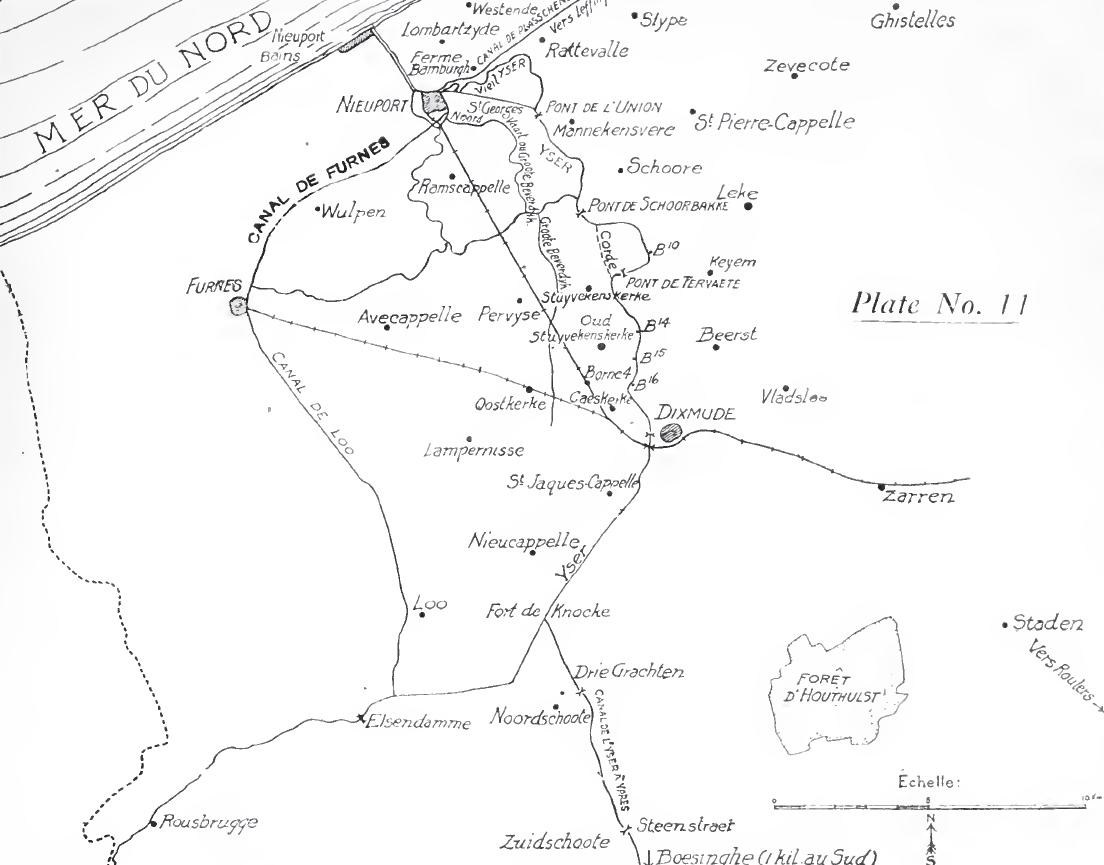
On this World War I era map, Fort de Knocke is shown at the confluence of the Yser and the Canal de Yser à Ypres. Note its relationship to Dixmude, Furnes and Nieuport.

=== Early history ===
A fort was first erected at the site by the Spanish between 1584 and 1591 during the Eighty Years' War. The able Spanish general Alexander Farnese, Duke of Parma had captured Ypres and Veurne (Furnes). The fort was intended to block raiding parties of Dutch rebels coming from the port of Ostend. The successful Siege of Ostend removed the Dutch threat in 1604 and the fort fell into disuse. Spain awoke to the location's strategic importance during the Franco-Spanish War. In 1649 a new fort was constructed in the fork between the Yser River and the Ypres Canal.

France acquired the Castellany of Veurne-Ambacht by the Treaty of Aix-la-Chapelle in 1668. King Louis XIV wanted a double line of fortresses to protect the northern border of his kingdom. The fortifications expert Sébastien Le Prestre de Vauban immediately noted the importance of its location and set to work redesigning Fort de la Knocque in 1678. The core of the fort was a triangular island on the south side of the streams' confluence. A hornwork and ravelin with brick parapets protected the southeast side. The fort was expanded between 1690 and 1692 with the addition of two bastions, one on the north side and one on the south. Ravelins were added on the east and west sides, while three lunettes completed the defenses. All the new works were constructed of earth. Sometime between 1692 and 1712 a wide moat was added on the east and west sides.

=== Clash in 1695 ===
Fort de la Knocque was attacked by the Grand Alliance during the Nine Years' War. In June 1695, the army of King William III of England was encamped at Aarsele between Tielt and Deinze. After detaching 11 squadrons of cavalry to join Maximilian II Emanuel, Elector of Bavaria's forces at Ninove, the army moved south on 10 June to threaten the French lines. French commander Marshal François de Neufville, duc de Villeroi put his defenses on alert at Veurne, Fort de la Knocque, Ypres and Menen (Menin).

On 19 June 1695 the Duke of Württemberg with 3,000 soldiers and supporting artillery advanced on Fort de la Knocque. A half-league from the fort was a French outpost on the Yser held by Count de la Mothe and over 400 dragoons. This post was attacked and, though reinforced, it was captured after a tenacious defense. At their newly seized bridgehead, the Allies built a temporary fort and armed it with two cannons. The French constructed a nearby counter-battery and numerous casualties were inflicted on both sides. The Allies tried to expand their bridgehead, but were thwarted by French counter-measures and cannon fire from Fort de la Knocque. After several days of skirmishing, the Allies withdrew on the night of 26–27 June.

It is assumed that the move against Fort de la Knocque was a feint attack, intended to distract the French from the Siege of Namur which followed in July. Even if the Allies had managed to widen their small bridgehead, they had to advance through a marsh which it would have been simple for the French to defend. However, the author felt that it was a serious attack and not a feint, because the British and their Dutch allies were particularly interested in seizing places along the Flanders coast.

=== Capture in 1712 ===
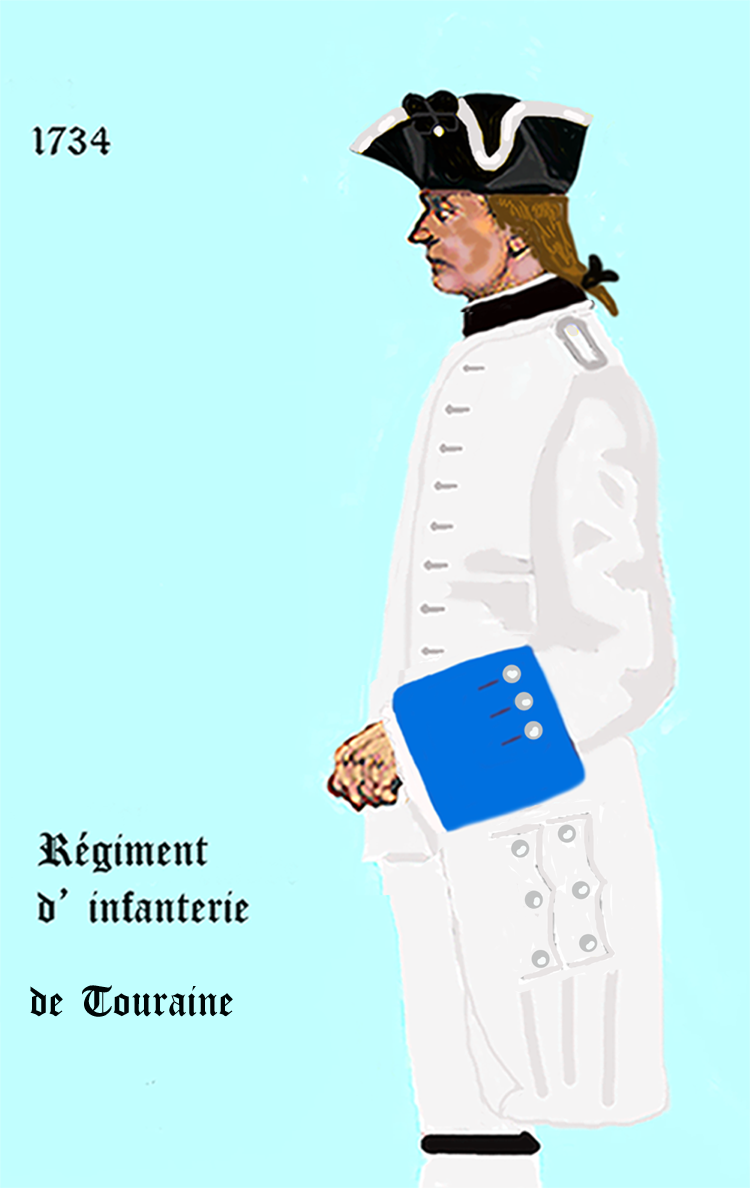
Touraine Regt. 1734

In 1712 when the War of the Spanish Succession was turning against Habsburg Austria, Prince Eugene of Savoy cast about for a way for his shaken troops to gain a success. He heard that the garrison of Fort de Knocque was weak and its security was lax. Eugene called for a partisan named La Rue, told him his plan to surprise the garrison and instructed him to call on the governor of Ostend to give him whatever help he needed. At the same time Eugene alerted Lieutenant General Robert Murray at Lille to hold some troops ready to assist in the coup. La Rue's free company and some troops from Ostend stealthily took position in gardens near the fort where they caught and killed two sentries. La Rue disguised several of his men as peasants with their loaded weapons concealed in a cart. Appearing before the fort, they called out that they wanted to sell their wares to the officers and were admitted. The first group of partisans seized the door to the fort. After that, it was easy for a second disguised group to burst into the fort to find most of the officers and men inside their barracks. A few men raised the alarm but they were rapidly subdued at sword and bayonet point. When Murray arrived, he found the garrison prisoners of war. The general put a Dutch garrison into the fort and returned to Lille.

By the Treaty of Utrecht in 1713, France ceded control of Veurne-Ambacht to the Austrian Netherlands. By a unique arrangement, a line of fortresses in Austrian territory were handed over to the Dutch Republic to provide a barrier against future French invasions. From west to east, these were Veurne, Fort Knokke, Ypres, Menen, Tournai, Mons, Charleroi and Namur.

=== Siege of 1744 ===
In 1744 during the War of the Austrian Succession, a French army of 87,000 troops launched a campaign against the fortresses in Flanders. To oppose the French, the Allied army counted 65,000 men, including 15,000 soldiers in fortress garrisons. The French captured the fortress of Menen on 5 June 1744 after a one-week siege. Then the French began the successful Siege of Ypres which surrendered on 24 June. Joseph Marie de Boufflers began the siege of Fort Knokke on 29 June and it capitulated after several hours. The attacking force amounted to three or four infantry battalions and two artillery batteries. Fort Knokke was only defended by a tiny garrison of 75 men. It was suggested that the half-day bombardment was conducted in order for its commander De Lewe to make an honorable surrender.

The French employed units of the Piemont, Bourbonnais, Rohan, Royal, Touraine, Noailles, Orleans, La Couronne, Richecourt, Valenceau and du Roy Infantry Regiments. The cavalry contingent consisted of elements of the Egemont, La Suze and Mestre de Camp Cavalry Regiments and the Royal and Egemont Dragoons. The map depicting the siege called the fort La Kenoque. The central citadel within the junction of the streams is clearly visible. It is separated from the southern ramparts by a moat, making the citadel an island. There is a bastion on the west bank and another on the east bank. Both are covered by outworks.

=== Demolition ===
Fort de la Knocque was described as being located at the confluence of the Yser and Ieperlee at a distance of 1.5 leagues from Diksmuide, 3 leagues from Ypres and 4 leagues from both Veurne and Nieuwpoort (Nieuport). The fort was 750 by 500 feet (pieds) in extent and entry to the fort was through a narrow door. There were only a few casernes for the soldiers to live in, though the fort's commander had his own house and there was a chapel. After the mid-1700s, the fortifications lost much of their purpose. In 1781 Emperor Joseph II ordered Fort Knokke to be "slighted" or dismantled. The fort south of the junction of the Yser and Ypres Canal with its brick parapet was completely removed. The remainder of the raised defenses remain partly preserved amid modern pastureland.

== External references ==
- "De contouren van Fort Knokke" (in Dutch). Facebook: Diksmuide stadsarchief (city archives).
