= Michel de Dreux-Brézé =

French nobleman

Michel de Dreux-Brézé Marquis de Dreux-Brézé
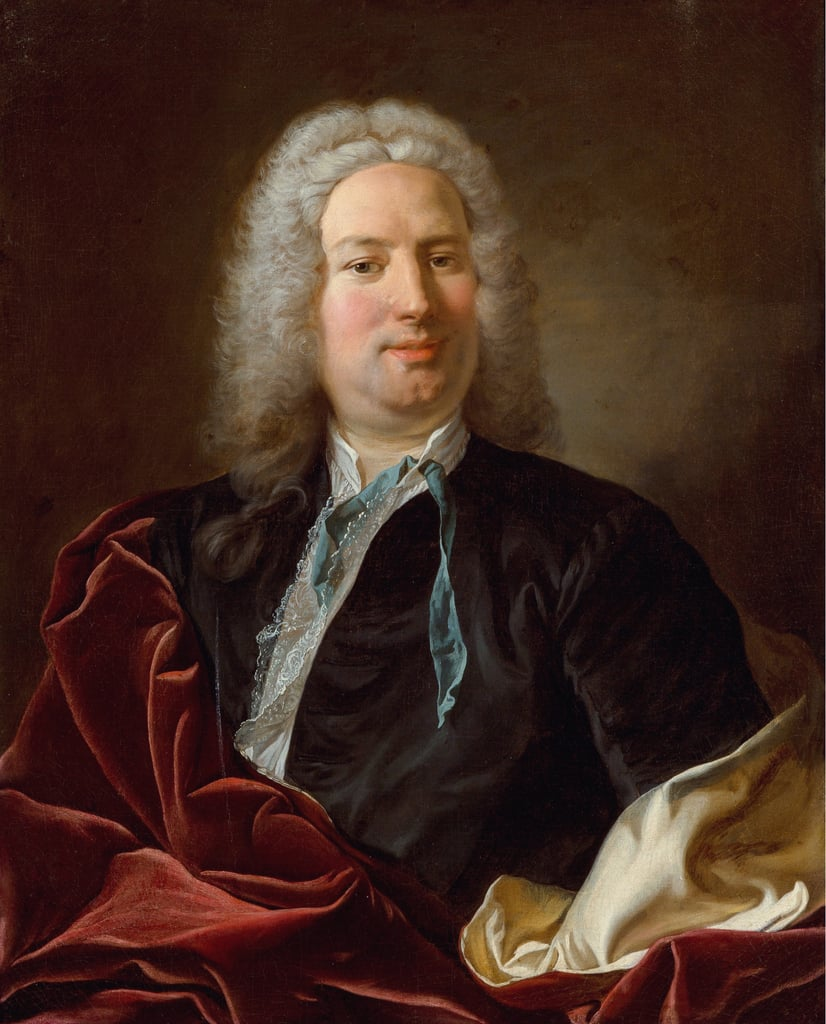
- Portrait by Jean-Baptiste van Loo
- Born: 15 June 1700
- Died: 17 February 1754 (aged 53)
- Military career
- Allegiance: Kingdom of France
- Service years: 1717–1754
- Rank: Lieutenant General
- Conflicts: War of the Austrian Succession

Michel de Dreux-Brézé, Marquis de Dreux-Brézé (15 June 1700 – 17 February 1754) was a French nobleman, military officer and courtier in the reign of Louis XV.

== Biography ==
Dreux-Brézé was the son of Thomas de Dreux-Brézé and the grandson of Michel Chamillart. In 1717 he joined the musketeers and in 1718 he was named colonel of the Guyenne Regiment.

He became brigadier of the king's armies and commander in Nancy in 1734. He was made inspector general of the infantry in 1741 and was promoted to lieutenant general of the king's armies and general marshal of the army quarters in 1744. He served under Maurice de Saxe during the War of the Austrian Succession, notably commanding the French forces during a stage of the Siege of Tournai in 1745. He was commander-in-chief of Flanders and Hainaut, then governor of Loudun and Île Sainte-Marguerite.

Between 1749 and his death, he served Louis XV at the court of Versailles as Grand Master of Ceremonies of France and Provost Master of Ceremonies of the Order of the Holy Spirit. These positions were hereditary and held by Dreux-Brézé's descendants, most notably Henri Evrard, marquis de Dreux-Brézé.

Dreux-Brézé first married his cousin, Isabelle de Dreux-Nancré, granddaughter of Claude de Dreux-Nancré. Following her death, he married secondly Louise-Élisabeth de La Châtre, daughter of the Marquis Louis-Charles de La Châtre.
