= Siege of Tournai (1745) =

Siege during the War of the Austrian Succession

- Part of the War of the Austrian Succession
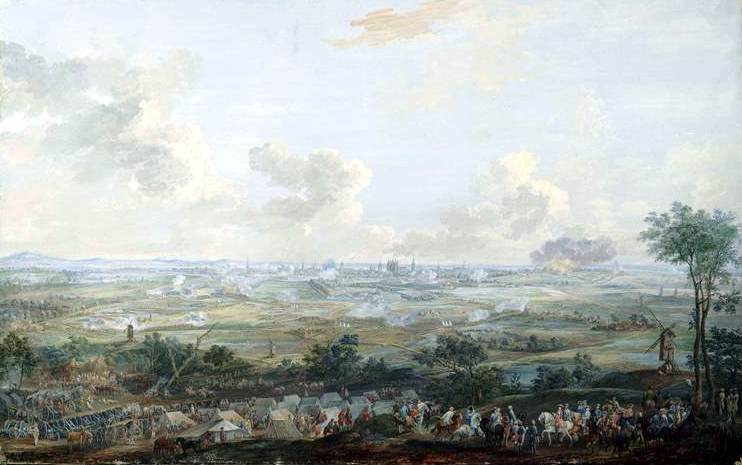
- Siège de Tournai par Louis XV by Louis Nicolas Van Blarenberghe
Date	28 April – 19 June 1745
Location	Tournai, Austrian Netherlands 50°36′20″N 03°23′17″E
Result	French victory

Belligerents
France	Dutch Republic

Commanders and leaders
Louis XV; Marshal Saxe; Marquis de Dreux-Brézé	Baron Van Dorth (city); Baron Van Brackel (citadel)

Strength
72,000 (at peak)	~9,000

Casualties and losses
Unknown	~2,500
- Location of Tournai in modern day Belgium

The siege of Tournai was a two-month siege of the city and citadel of Tournai, then part of the Austrian Netherlands, in 1745 during the War of the Austrian Succession. The allied Pragmatic Army's attempt to relieve the siege resulted in the decisive French victory at the Battle of Fontenoy on 11 May. The largely Dutch garrison of the city subsequently surrendered to French forces on 22 May, while the garrison of the citadel surrendered on 19 June 1745. It was one of the longest sieges of the war.

== Background ==
In early 1745, the French commander Marshal Saxe conceived a plan to attack Tournai, a strategically important city close to the French border which controlled access to the upper Scheldt basin. The city was a vital link in northern Europe's trading network. The city, whose population then amounted to 21,400 inhabitants, was part of the Barrier Forts, established since 1714 by the Dutch Republic as a defensive line against France. With a garrison of approximately 9,000 Dutch, Swiss and Scottish soldiers in April 1745, it was the strongest of the Dutch forts in the Austrian Netherlands, a factor Saxe hoped would force the Allies to fight for it. The Dutch garrison was commanded by the city's governor, Baron Johan Adolf Van Dorth.

== Siege ==
=== 25 April to 22 May ===
The first French forces closed on the city on 25 April. Van Dorth immediately had Tournai's suburbs set on fire and ordered a sortie on Orcq, which was easily repelled by the French cannon. After a series of diversionary moves, Saxe laid siege to Tournai on 28 April with his main force of 72,000 soldiers. He moved his men into the siege lines, crossing to the left bank of the Scheldt in order to surround the Vauban-designed citadel. The defences had been poorly maintained and sectors were in disrepair; Saxe planned to make these sections his primary effort, directing his artillery against the same sector of walls breached by the Duke of Marlborough in the siege of 1709. French engineers constructed pontoon bridges at Calonne and Constantin to enable communication and movement between Saxe's forces on both banks of the river. On the evening of 30 April to 1 May, a trench was opened opposite the Porte des Sept-Fontaines, on the left bank of the Scheldt. The French cannon were quickly unleashed on the city's fortifications.

Having confirmed the Allies were approaching from the south-east to relieve the siege, on 7 May Saxe left 22,000 men (27 and a half battalions and 17 squadrons) under the Marquis de Dreux-Brézé to continue the siege. Saxe placed his main force of 50,000 around the villages of Fontenoy and Antoing, eight kilometres (5.0 miles) from Tournai. Dreux-Brézé was to prosecute the siege with 25 12lb and 20 8lb 3oz mortars, together with 90 heavy cannon with calibres ranging from 12lb to 33lb.

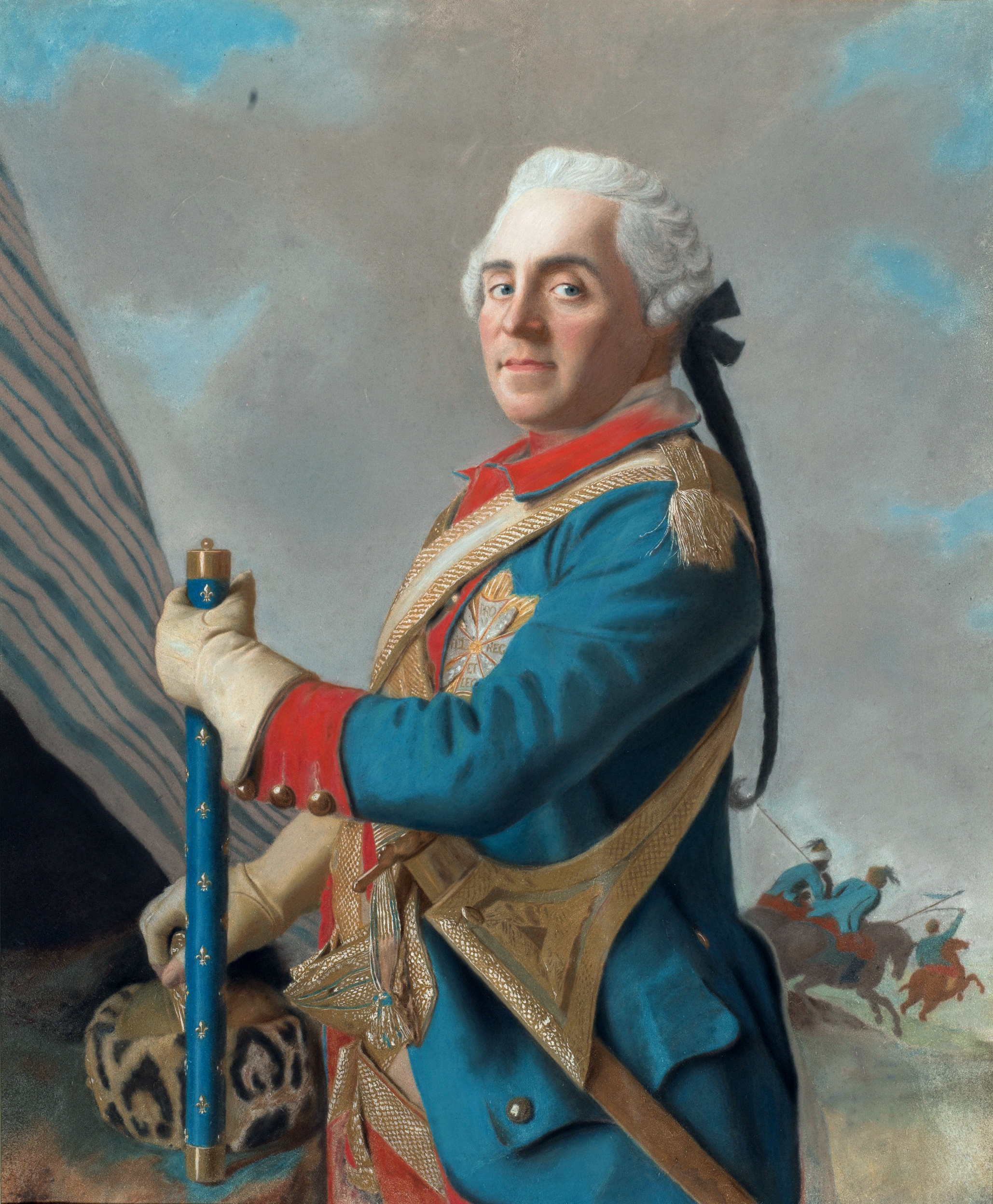
Maurice de Saxe, the commander of French forces during the siege

On 8 May, Louis XV and his heir, Louis, Dauphin of France joined the French siege camp outside Tournai with Joseph Marie de Boufflers. At around 3.00pm on the same day, an explosion occurred in a powder magazine of the citadel; the citadel was badly damaged and the explosion caused numerous casualties. That afternoon, an accidental explosion in the French lines caused the death of the Marquis de Talleyrand-Périgord and the siege engineer, Desmazis.

On 11 May, during the battle of Fontenoy, a small number of Dutch cavalry from the garrison attempted a sortie, which was repulsed by the French besiegers. With the Allied defeat at the Fontenoy, Saxe successfully removed the threat of the British and Dutch relieving the siege. Karl August, Prince of Waldeck and Pyrmont and other Dutch commanders were reluctant to abandon their garrison at Tournai, but were forced to comply with the decision of the British commander, Prince William, Duke of Cumberland, to retreat. Tournai's garrison, including the Swiss regiment of Hirtzel and the Scottish regiment of MacKay, nevertheless continued the defence of the city. Saxe returned from the battle to resume command of the siege.

On 18 May, the French set foot on the main bastion of the Porte des Sept-Fontaines. The colonel of the Scottish regiment, Colonel Daniel Aeneas Mackay, was killed. This was followed by French artillery breaching several of the city's ramparts. On 22 May, a white flag was hoisted on the wall; the city had surrendered. The next day, 23 May 1745, a military surrender was signed by Saxe and Van Dorth.

=== 23 May to 19 June ===
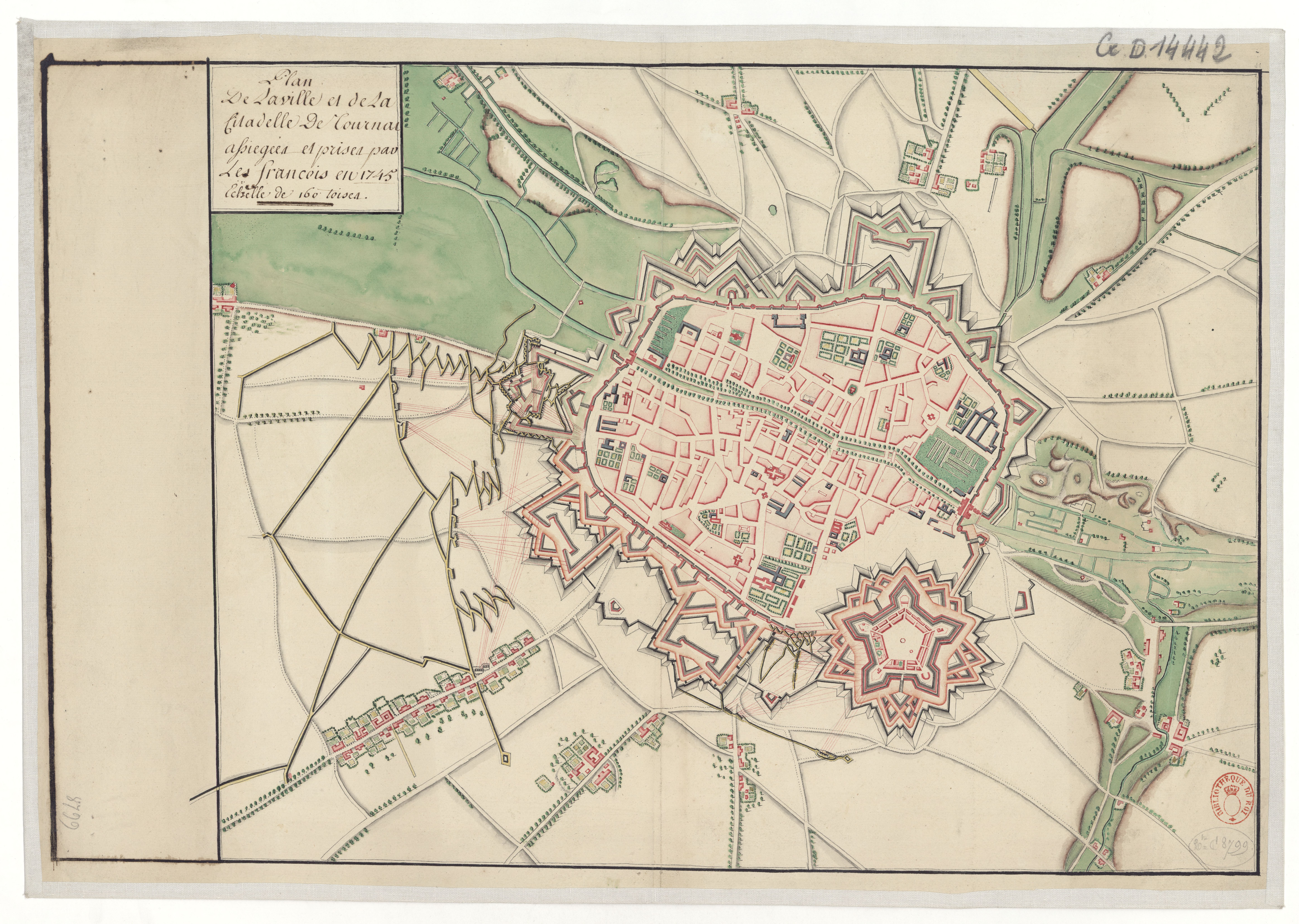
A plan of Tournai in 1745, clearly showing the city walls and citadel

After the surrender of the city, the remaining Dutch garrison withdrew to the devastated citadel and awaited orders from The Hague to either surrender or continue the fight from the citadel. After eight days of truce, the decision was made to continue to resist the siege. By this stage, the garrison has been reduced to some 6,500 men under the command of Baron Van Brackel.

The siege of the citadel began on 1 June. Despite a prolonged defence under French cannon and mortar fire, the Dutch garrison was forced to surrender on 19 June. For its honourable defence, the garrison was granted the honours of war by Marshal Saxe and withdrew towards Oudenaarde. The citadel was then reduced to rubble by the French.

== Aftermath ==
Having lasted 47 days, the siege of Tournai and its citadel was one of the longest in the War of Austrian Succession. By order of King Louis XV, the cathedral and the main buildings of the city had been spared from the cannonades. Tournai became a French possession again for the first time since its capture by Marlborough in 1709. However, three years later in October 1748, the Treaty of Aix-la-Chapelle returned the city to Austria. In January 1749, the last French soldiers left the city.
