= Barrier Treaty =

Series of three Austro-Dutch agreements (1709 - 1715)

Barrier Treaties
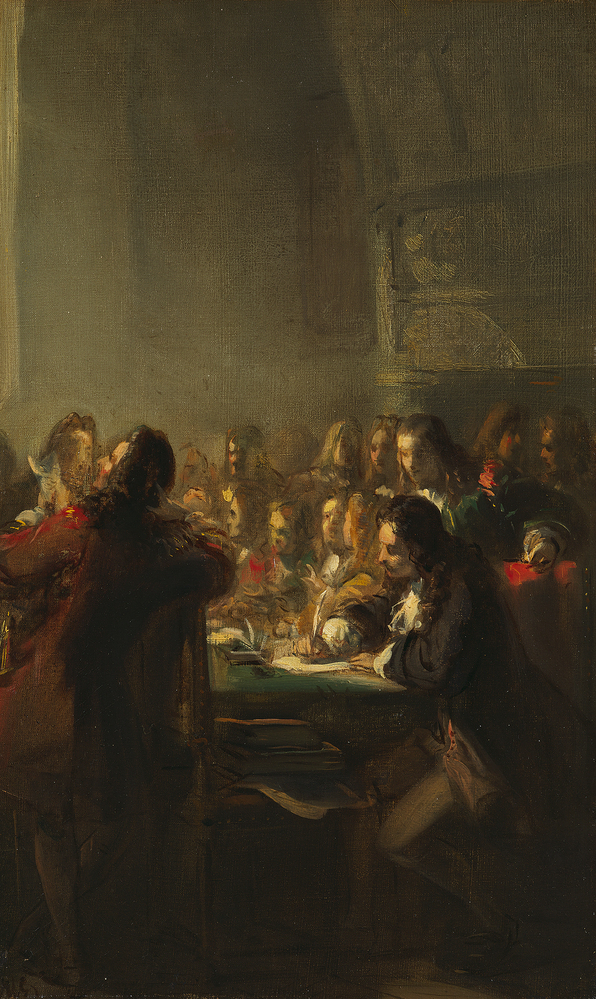
- The Barrier Treaty of 1715, by Johannes Hinderikus Egenberger.
- Signed: 29 October 1709; 29 January 1713; 15 November 1715; 30–31 January 1716
- Effective: 15 November 1715
- Condition: To help defend against French invasion, Dutch troops occupy fortresses within the Austrian Netherlands and share the costs with Austria.
- Expiration: 1781
- Signatories: (Kingdom of Great Britain) Great Britain; Habsburg monarchy; Dutch Republic

Locations of barrier fortresses as agreed in 1715, shown on a map of modern Belgium

The Barrier Treaties (Dutch: Barrièretraktaat or Barrièreverdrag; French: traités de la Barrière) were a series of agreements signed and ratified between 1709 and 1715 that created a buffer zone between the Dutch Republic and France by allowing the Dutch to occupy a number of fortresses in the Habsburg Netherlands, ruled by the Spanish or the Austrians. The treaties were cancelled by Austria in 1781.

== Background ==
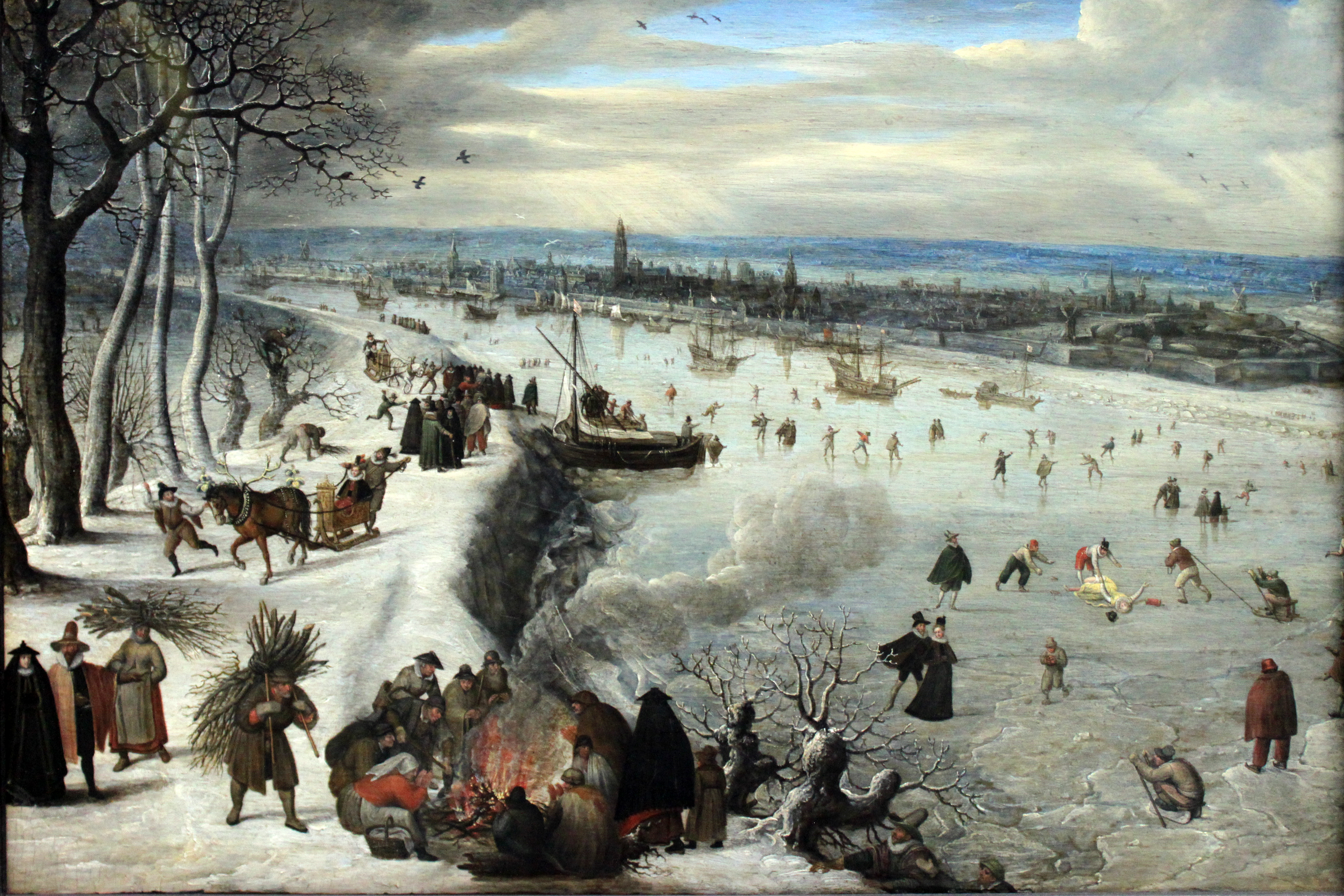
Antwerp and the frozen Scheldt (1590); control of the vital trading route formed part of the discussions on the Barrier Treaties.

From 1672 to 1697, a series of wars with France demonstrated the Dutch Republic's vulnerability to invasion via the Spanish Netherlands, which led to debate on how to design fortifications that were effective in the flat terrain of the Netherlands and where to locate them. That resulted in the concept of forward defence, or so-called Barrier Fortresses, in the Spanish Netherlands to provide strategic depth.

It was accepted that no fortified place could hold out indefinitely. The Dutch were nearly overrun in 1672 by the speed that the French captured three dozen major fortresses and were saved only by flooding. In the 1673 Siege of Maastricht, the best-prepared Dutch fortress held out only thirteen days. The Barrier was intended to slow down an attacking army to allow the Dutch time to reinforce their defences without the expense of a large standing army.

After the 1697 Treaty of Ryswick, the governor of the Spanish Netherlands, Maximilian of Bavaria, permitted the Dutch to garrison eight cities, including Namur and Mons. However, in February 1701, the French quickly occupied them. Re-establishing the Barrier was the primary Dutch objective during the War of the Spanish Succession and was specified in Article 5 of the Treaty of The Hague (1701), which reformed the Grand Alliance. The Barrier also had an economic element since the 1648 Peace of Münster gave the Dutch a monopoly over the Scheldt and made its extent a matter of debate, particularly with Britain. The Scheldt estuary was a key transportation point for European import and export. Its control was a valuable commercial asset and allowed the merchants of Amsterdam to undermine severely the trade of the commercial rival, Antwerp.

== First Treaty (1709) ==
The first treaty was signed on 29 October 1709 between Great Britain and the States-General and was driven primarily by the need to keep the Dutch in the War of the Spanish Succession. In return for Dutch support of the Protestant succession and a commitment to continuing the war, Britain agreed to the Barrier, which effectively gave the Dutch permanent control of the Spanish Netherlands. It included Nieuwpoort, Ypres, Menen, Lille, Tournai, Valenciennes, Maubeuge, Charleroi, and Namur. The terms were seen as overly generous by British commercial interests since they included ports in Northern Flanders like Dendermonde and Ghent, which controlled trade along the Scheldt, rather than blocking potential invasion routes.

== Second Treaty (1713) ==
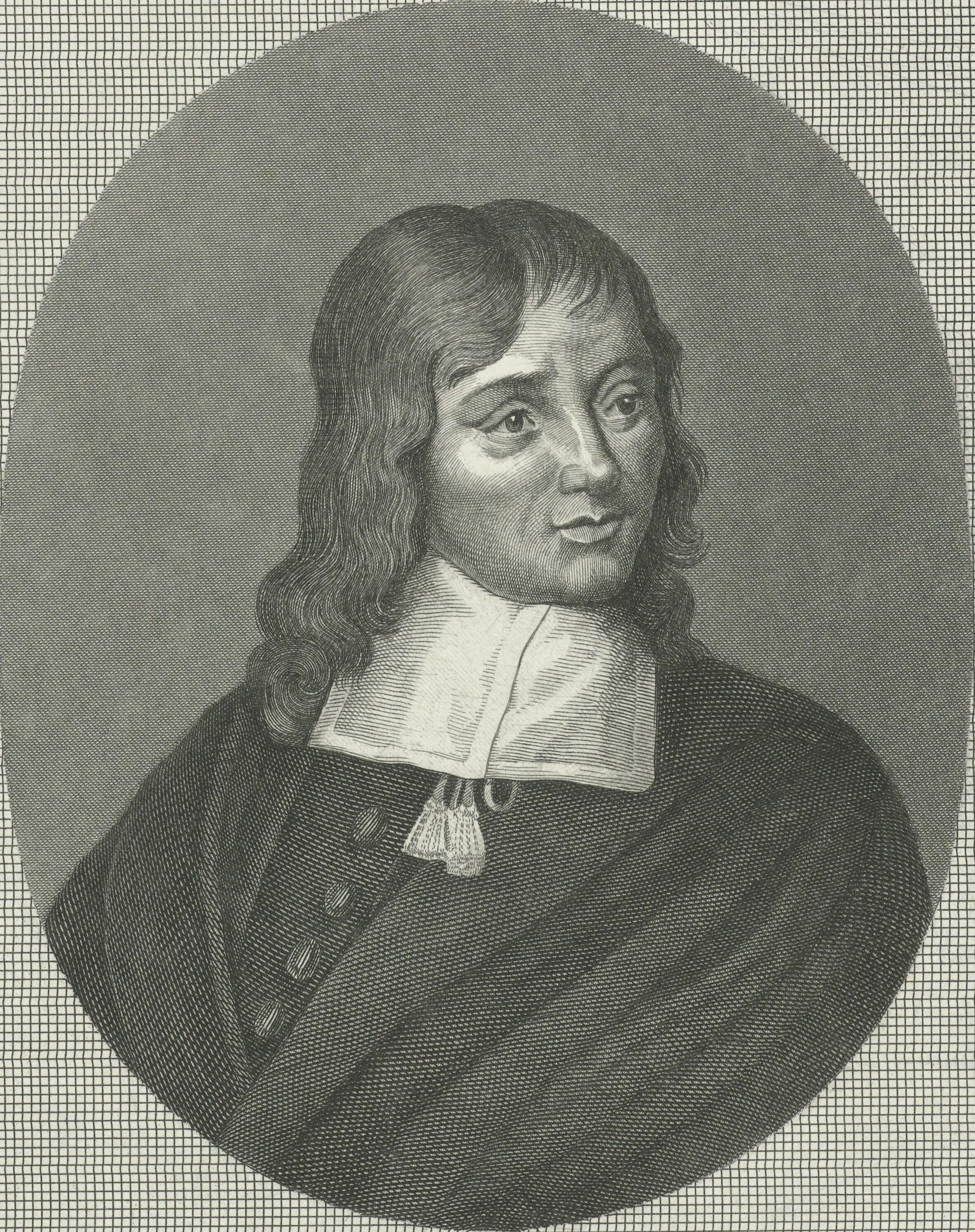
Anthonie Heinsius, the Grand Pensionary of Holland, who was one of the greatest Dutch propontents of the Barrier.

The 1710 British general election replaced the existing Whig government with a Tory administration that derived much of its support from the powerful City of London Corporation, a merchants' guild. There were demands for the greater protection of British commercial access and the removal of Ostend and Dendermonde from the list. A revised version was signed on 29 January 1713, which reduced the number of Barrier fortresses to 15; Britain agreed to ensure compliance from the future ruler of the Spanish Netherlands.

== Third Treaty (1715) ==
The third and final treaty confirmed terms contained in the 1714 Treaty of Rastatt between Austria and France by establishing a permanent Austro-Dutch military force of 30,000 to 35,000 men stationed in the Austrian Netherlands. The Dutch would pay 40% of the costs and Austria the other 60% and an additional lump sum to maintain the Barrier and its garrisons, which were reduced to seven, with a mixed garrison at Dendermond. The treaty also renewed the 1648 Peace of Münster over the Scheldt but promised "equal treatment" for Dutch and British commerce. The treaty was signed on 15 November 1715 and further detailed by two Austrian-Dutch agreements of 30 and 31 January 1716. (Note: Emperor Charles VI and Frederick William I of Prussia also ceded several cities in the Upper Guelders region to the United Provinces.)

== Aftermath ==
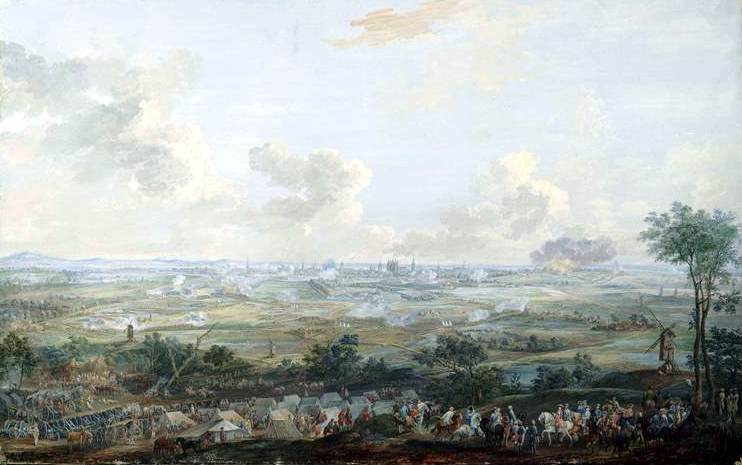
The siege of Tournai by the French army in 1745

The Dutch Republic ended the war in 1713 effectively bankrupt, but the Dutch goal had been achieved. The Barrier was to provide a basis for peace in Europe by perpetuating the balance of power and was to forge a foundation for the alliance between Austria, Great Britain and the Dutch Republic. Its central role enabled the Dutch Republic to participate in European power politics after 1713. Although judged favourably by contemporaries, the Barrier has later been argued by historians to have offered illusory protection. The Austrians were reluctant to pay for fortresses that they did not control, which were conquered by France during the War of the Austrian Succession. However, not all modern historians consider the barrier ineffective. Historians like Wijn and Van Nimwegen emphasise that it took three years of campaigning for the French to conquer all barrier fortresses during the War of Austrian Succession and that the purpose of the Barrier was to give the Dutch enough time to mobilise and fortify their own borders. According to them, nobody in the Dutch Republic was under the illusion that the barrier would itself stop French armies.

However, the forts themselves were only part of the Dutch defence system; political and diplomatic treaties were more important, particularly since Britain could not allow a hostile power to control ports in Northern Flanders like Ostend. Britain's agreement to act as guarantor of the treaty and to provide the Dutch with military support against any aggressor ultimately proved to be far more effective than the Barrier itself.

After Austria allied with France in 1756, the French threat to the Austrian Netherlands vanished and the Barrier became irrelevant. In 1781, the treaty was declared void by Emperor Joseph II. During the French Revolutionary Wars, French forces invaded and overran the Dutch Republic and established the Batavian Republic. The Netherlands remained directly or indirectly under French control for nearly two decades.

After Napoleon I's defeat in 1815, the Netherlands united with the former Austrian Netherlands and Prince-Bishopric of Liège to become the United Kingdom of the Netherlands. A stronger and more complex Barrier was constructed along the new Dutch-French border, supervised by the Duke of Wellington, a program that was largely complete by 1820, but the fortresses became part of Belgium after its independence in 1830.

== Sources ==
- Afflerbach, Holger and Strachan, Hew (ed); How Fighting Ends: A History of Surrender. (OUP, 2012)
- Kubben, Raymond; Regeneration and Hegemony; Franco-Batavian Relations in the Revolutionary Era 1795-1803. (Martinus Nijhoff, 2011);
- Low, John and Pulling, F.S.; The Dictionary of English History; (Cassell, 1910);
- Myers, Denys; Violation of Treaties: Bad Faith, Nonexecution and Disregard (American Journal of International Law, 1917);
- Nolan, Cathal; Wars of the Age of Louis XIV, 1650-1715: An Encyclopedia of Global Warfare and Civilization (Greenwood, 2008);
- Veve, Thomas Dwight; The Duke of Wellington and the British Army of Occupation in France, 1815-1818. (Greenwood, 1992).
- Van Nimwegen, Olaf (2002). De Republiek der Verenigde Nederlanden als grote mogendheid: Buitenlandse politiek en oorlogvoering in de eerste helft van de achttiende eeuw en in het bijzonder tijdens de Oostenrijkse Successieoorlog (1740–1748) (in Dutch). De Bataafsche Leeuw. ISBN 9789067075404.
- Wijn, J.W. (1964). Het Staatsche Leger: Deel VIII Het tijdperk van de Spaanse Successieoorlog (The Dutch States Army: Part VIII The era of the War of the Spanish Succession) (in Dutch). Martinus Nijhoff.
