= Ségur =

Ségur may refer to:

== Nobility ==
- House of Ségur, a family of the French surname and past nobility origins and related to royal families of Europe:
  - Jean-Isaac, marquis de Ségur (d. 1707), military commander, part of Marquessate, and grandfather of Nicholas-Alexandre
  - Henri Joseph, marquis de Ségur (1661-1737), military commander and duke, part of Marquessate, and father of Henri François
  - Henri François, comte de Ségur (1689-1751), military commander, part of Marquessate
  - Nicolas-Alexandre, marquis de Ségur (1695-1755) owner of Château Lafite, Château Latour, Château Mouton and Château Calon-Ségur, part of Marquessate
  - Angélique de Froissy, comtesse de Ségur (1702-1785), illegitimate daughter of Philippe II, Duke of Orléans married to Henri François
  - Philippe Henri, marquis de Ségur (1724-1801), marshal of France, part of Marquessate
  - Louis Philippe, comte de Ségur (1753-1830), diplomat and historian, son of Philippe Henri, part of Marquessate
  - Joseph-Alexandre Pierre de Ségur, Viscount of Ségur (1756-1805), writer and commissary of Paris, second son of Philippe Henri, part of Marquessate
  - Octave, comte de Ségur (1779-1818), soldier, famous suicide, son of Louis Philippe, part of Marquessate
  - Philippe Paul, comte de Ségur (1780-1873), general and historian, son of Louis Philippe, part of Marquessate
  - Eugène Henri Raymond, comte de Ségur (1798-1869), son of Octave-Henri, part of Marquessate
  - Countess of Ségur, Sophie Rostopchine (1799-1874), writer of children's stories, wife of Eugène, part of Marquessate
  - Raymond Joseph Paul, comte de Ségur d'Aguesseau (1803-1889), jurist, third son of Octave-Henri, part of Marquessate
  - Louis Gaston Adrien de Ségur (1820-1881), bishop, son of Eugène and Sophie, part of the marquessate
  - Anatole Henri Philippe, marquis de Ségur (1823-1902), statesman and writer, son of Eugène and Sophie, part of the Marquessate
  - Marie Célestine Amélie d'Armaillé (1830-1918), writer, biographer, historian; daughter of Philippe Paul, comte de Ségur
  - Pierre Marie Maurice Henri, marquis de Ségur (1853–1916), writer, part of the Marquessate

== Places ==
- Ségur, Aveyron, a commune of the Aveyron département, France
  - Château de Montségur, a former fortress near the commune
- Ségur-le-Château, a commune of the Corrèze département, France, and a castle nearby
- Le Ségur, a commune of the Tarn département, France
- Ségur station, a Paris Metro station in Paris, France

== See also ==
- Sigur Plateau or Segur Plateau, plateau in Tamil Nadu, India
  - Tiger of Segur, a man-eating tiger in and around the plateau
