= Billot =

Billot (English: /biːˈjoʊ/ or /biˈloʊ/, French: [bijo]) is a French surname. It may refer to:

- Jean-Baptiste Billot (1828–1907), French general and politician
- Ken Billot (born ?), New Zealand footballer
- Louis Billot (1846–1931), French theologian, elevated to cardinal (later resigned)
- Nicolas-Joseph Billot de La Ferrière (1749–1816), French actor
- Paul Constant Billot (1796–1863), French botanist
- Victor Billot, New Zealand writer, musician, trade unionist, and politician

== See also ==
- Fayl-Billot, a district of France
