= Jean-Baptiste-Denis Despré =

French journalist and publisher (1752–1832)

Jean-Baptiste-Denis Després
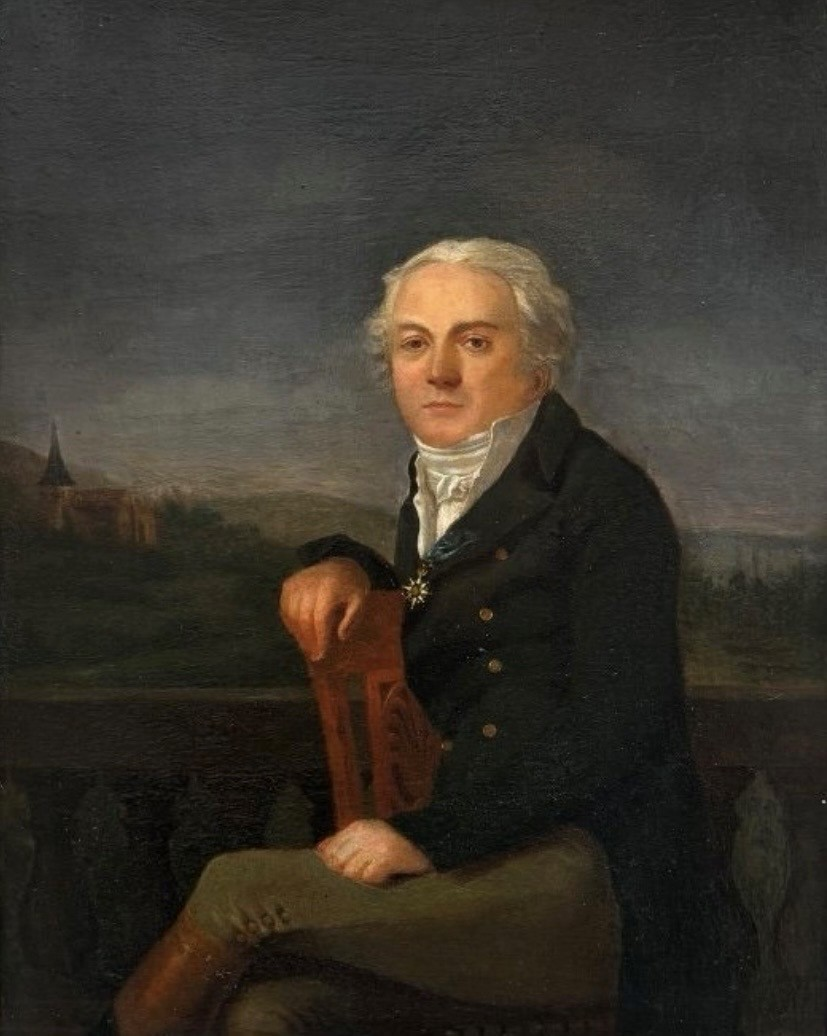
- Jean-Baptiste-Denis Després, portrayed around 1820, wearing a Dutch order, sitting on a chair on the terrace of his house overlooking the village of Crécy-la-Chapelle, where he was the mayor. The church of the village can be seen in the background.
- Born: 24 June 1752; Dijon, France
- Died: 2 March 1832 (aged 80); Paris, France
- Occupations: Journalist, publisher, playwright, librettist, translator and private secretary

Jean-Baptiste-Denis Després (1752–1832) was a French journalist, publisher, playwright, librettist and translator, who was educated at the College Mazarin.

He also achieved fame and renown as a loyal private secretary, confidant and advisor to influential personalities, including writers, diplomats, military leaders and kings.

== Secretary and confidant of the personalities of his time ==
From the mid-1770s Jean-Baptiste-Denis Després was the secretary for Pierre Victor, Baron de Besenval de Brunstatt, at the baron's residence in Paris, the Hôtel de Besenval. After the baron's death in 1791, he remained in the service of his son, Joseph-Alexandre Pierre, Vicomte de Ségur, who lived for a time in the Hôtel de Besenval after his father's death.

The Baron de Besenval and Jean-Baptiste-Denis Després shared a close friendship and a deep relationship of trust. And so he wrote in a letter in 1787 about the baron:

"The Baron de Besenval was one of those men to whom all things prospered."

— Jean-Baptiste-Denis Després in a letter addressed to Maria Anna, Baronne von Roll von Emmenholz, née de Diesbach de Torny, wife of Franz Joseph, Baron von Roll von Emmenholz, a relative of the baron from Solothurn

At the request of the Vicomte de Ségur, Jean-Baptiste-Denis Després sorted the literary estate of the Baron de Besenval, which included his memoirs, published by the Vicomte de Ségur between 1805 and 1806. The publication caused a scandal among the aristocracy, as the baron did not shy away from describing life and customs at the French royal court in the last years of the Ancien Régime in all its scandalous details, including the names of the protagonists. However, some names were only hinted at, allowing those in the know to identify the person being referred to.

In September 1793, whilst he was still working for the Vicomte de Ségur, Jean-Baptiste-Denis Després organised a house viewing for the wife and daughter of Alexandre-Théodore Brongniart, the architect of the baron's famous nymphaeum in the basement of the Hôtel de Besenval, Anne Louise Brongniart, née Degrémont (1744–1829), and Emilie Louise Alexandrine (1780–1847). He showed them the various rooms, including the nymphaeum. At that time, two years before the famous auction of 10 August 1795, conducted by Alexandre Joseph Paillet, the house was still furnished with precious furniture and works of art, including the painting La Gimblette. Jean-Baptiste-Denis Després then invited the two ladies to lunch in the dining room of the Hôtel de Besenval, which had also been designed by Alexandre-Théodore Brongniart in 1782.

In 1805, Jean-Baptiste-Denis Després became the secretary of Louis Bonaparte, who was King of Holland from 1806 to 1810 and appointed him to the Council of State. He was also a confidante of Hortense de Beauharnais, the Queen of Holland. Jean-Baptiste-Denis Després was a trusted official who ensured official communication between the queen and the various departments or interlocutors concerned, thus facilitating the management of the queen's affairs.

=== Revolutionary times ===
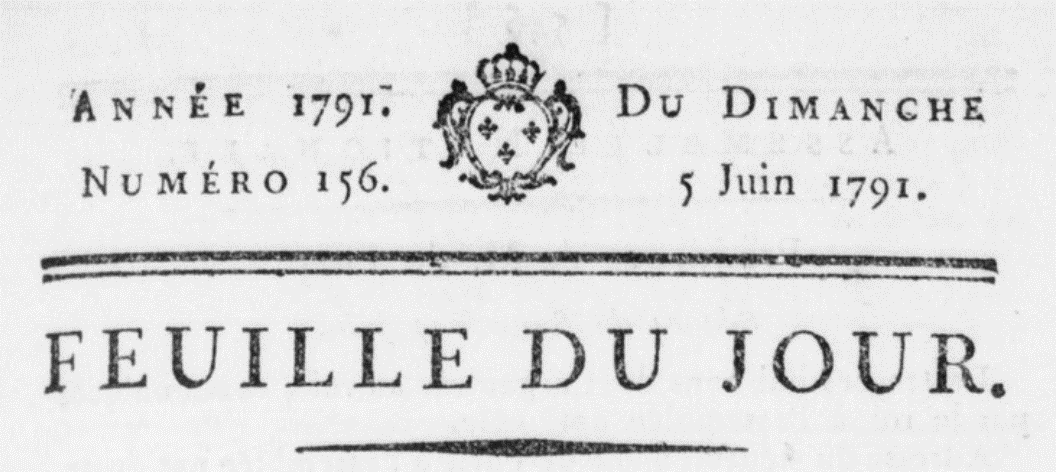
Header of the monarchist newspaper Feuille du jour, crowned with the royal fleurs-de-lys, printed at 74 Rue de Bondi in Paris.

After the death of his father, the Baron de Besenval, Joseph-Alexandre Pierre, Vicomte de Ségur, used the Hôtel de Besenval as the editorial headquarters for the monarchist newspaper La Feuille du jour, which he published together with the journalist Pierre-Germain Parisau and Jean-Baptiste-Denis Després. On 13 October 1793, the Vicomte de Ségur and Jean-Baptiste-Denis Després were arrested at the Hôtel de Besenval. They were accused of being pamphleteering counter-revolutionaries. Jean-Baptiste-Denis Després later managed to escape and the Vicomte de Ségur was released on 28 July 1794. The charges against him were dropped because the files could no longer be found. A friend of the Vicomte de Ségur, the actor Charles de La Buissière, managed to get himself employed at the Bureau of the Committee for Public Health. Charles de La Buissière destroyed the accusation file for Joseph-Alexandre Pierre de Ségur along with those of many other personalities of the Parisian scene, saving their lives.

== Literary and academic work ==
In 1783 at the Gaîté, Jean-Baptiste-Denis Després parodied plays of William Shakespeare, that was adapted by Jean-François Ducis.

Jean-Baptiste-Denis Després and Joseph-Alexandre Pierre de Ségur, were founding members of the Société: Les dîners du Vaudeville, a singing society, which was founded on 23 September 1796. From 1796 to 1797, Jean-Baptiste-Denis Després was the editor of the Journal littéraire. On 25 February 1803, the Chamber of Commerce of Paris was founded and he was appointed Secretary of the Council of Commerce. In 1810, he was chosen a member of the Council of the University of Paris. During the Restoration, Jean-Baptiste-Denis Després contributed to the following literary publications: Le Spectateur politique et littéraire and La Biographie universelle, ancienne et moderne, ou Histoire, par ordre alphabétique, de la vie publique et privée de tous les hommes qui se sont fait remarquer par leurs écrits, leurs actions, leurs talents, leurs vertus ou leurs crimes.

== Works ==
- 1776: La Bonne femme, ou le Phénix (vaudeville, parody of Alceste), (with Pierre-Yves Barré (1749-1832) and Pierre-Antoine-Augustin de Piis (1755-1832))
- 1777: L'Opéra de province (parody of Armide in two acts and in verse)
- 1783: Le Roi Lu (parodie du Roi Lir ou Lear, in one act and in verse)
- 1792: Cécile et Ermancé (opéra comique)
- 1793: Nice (one-act comédie en vaudeville, in prose, imitation of Stratonice)
- 1796: Le Retour à Bruxelles (one-act opéra comique)
- 1796: La Succession (one-act opéra comique), (with Jacques-Marie Deschamps)
- 1797: Le Pari (divertissement in one acte, en prose et en vaudevilles), (with Pierre-Yves Barré, Jacques-Marie Deschamps, François-Georges Desfontaines (1733-1825), and Jean-Baptiste Radet (1752-1830)
- 1798: Le portrait de Fielding (one-act comedy)
- 1799: L'Allarmiste (comédie en vaudeville)
- 1800: Le gondolier, ou La soirée venitienne (one-act opera), (with Louis-Philippe de Ségur (1753-1830))
- 1803: Saül (oratorio mis en action)
- 1803: Le Poète satyrique (one-act comedy, in verse)
- 1803: Une soirée de deux prisonniers, ou Voltaire et Richelieu (one-act comedy)
- 1804: Le pavillon du Calife ou Almanzor et Zobéide (opera)
- 1805: Le Nouveau magasin des modernes (one-act comedy, in prose)
- 1805: La Prise de Jéricho (oratorio in three parts)
- 1814: Le laboureur chinois (one-act opera), (with Jacques-Marie Deschamps (1750?-1826), Étienne Morel de Chédeville (1751-1814) and Henri-Montan Berton (1767-1844))
- 1822: Mémoires sur Garrick et sur Macklin
- 1822: Mémoires sur Molière, et sur Mme Guérin, sa veuve (notes and commentary)
- 1827: Œuvres choisies de Dorat

== Translations ==
- 1793: Le moine by Matthew Lewis
- 1794: The Mysteries of Udolpho by Ann Radcliffe
- 1798: Camilla, ou La peinture de la jeunesse by Fanny Burney (1752–1840)
- 1821: Works by Horace
- 1825–1827: Histoire d'Angleterre depuis l'invasion de Jules-César jusqu'à la révolution de 1688 by David Hume
- 1826: A Simple Story, by Elizabeth Inchbald (1753-1821)
