= Angélique de Froissy =

Illegitimate daughter of Philippe II, Duke of Orléans

- Comtesse de Ségur
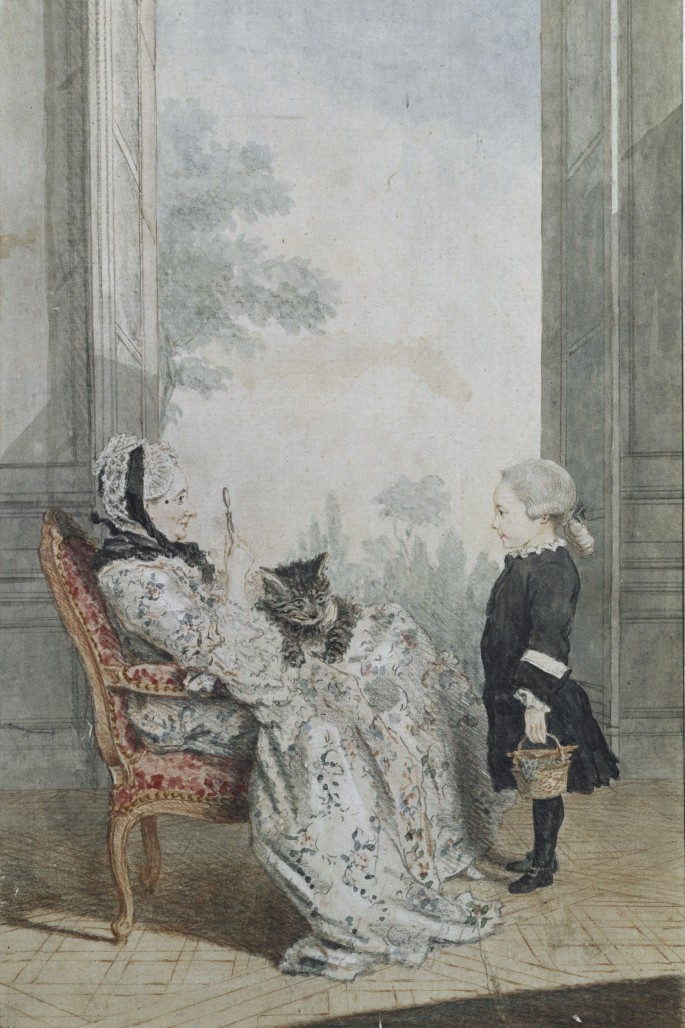
- The comtesse de Ségur with her grandson Joseph-Alexandre, watercolor by Louis Carrogis Carmontelle, 1763.
- Full name: Philippe Angélique de Froissy
- Born: 16 November 1700; Paris, France
- Died: 15 October 1785 (aged 84); Palace of Versailles, Kingdom of France
- Buried: Church of St. Eustache
- Spouse: Henri François, comte de Ségur (m. 1718; died 1751)
- Issue Detail: Philippine Charlotte; Henriette Élisabeth; Philippe Henri, marquis de Ségur; Philippe Angelique; Henriette Césarine, baroness de la Crozes
- Father: Philippe II, Duke of Orléans
- Mother: Charlotte Desmares

Philippe Angélique de Froissy (16 November 1700 – 15 October 1785 in Paris) was an illegitimate daughter of Philippe II, Duke of Orléans, the nephew and son-in-law of King Louis XIV of France. She was comtesse de Ségur by marriage, and a courtier of Louis XV, her cousin.

== Biography ==
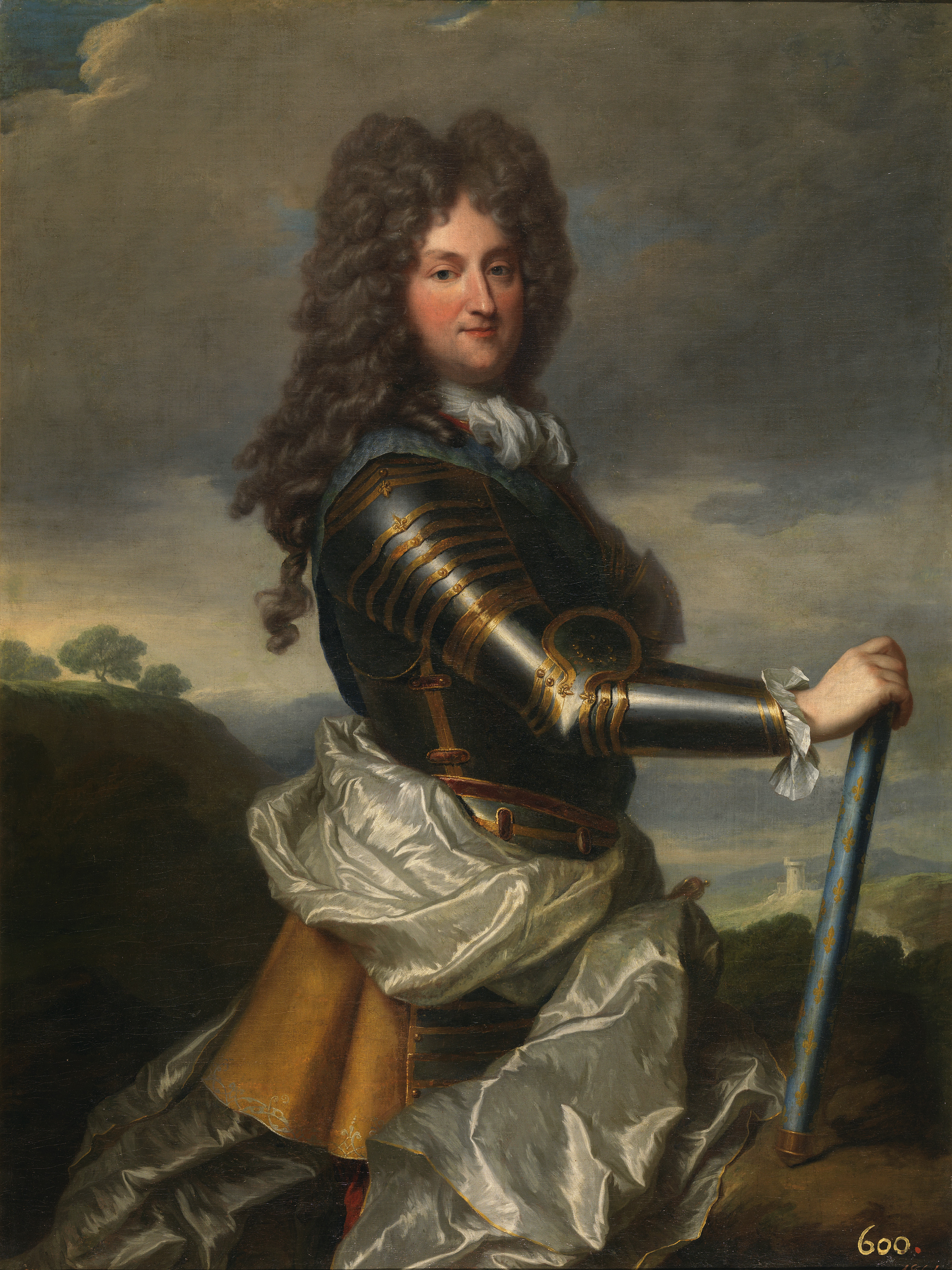
Jean-Baptiste Santerre, Philippe II, Duke of Orléans, ca. 1715–1716, oil on canvas, Prado, Madrid

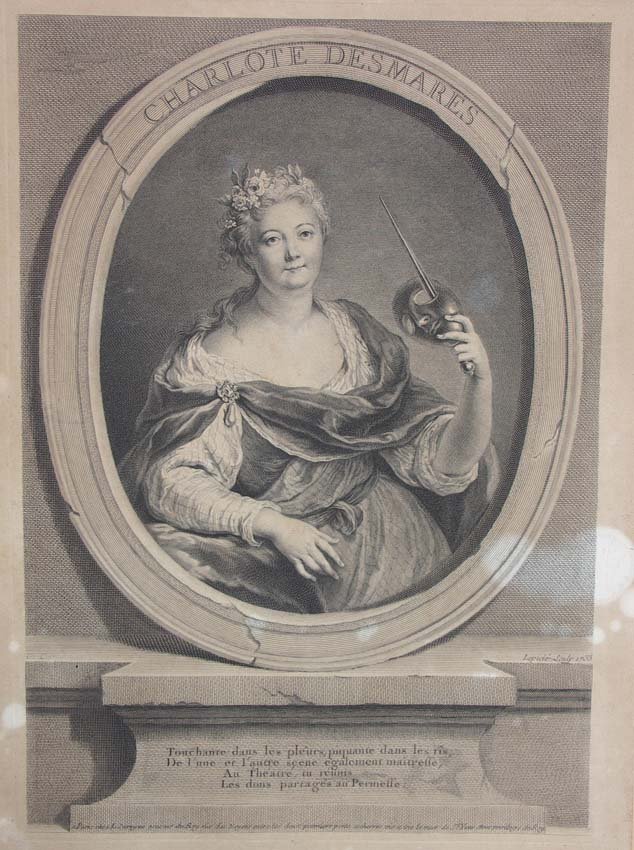
François-Bernard Lépicié after Charles-Antoine Coypel, Charlotte Desmares, 1733, etching, private collection

Angélique's parents, Philippe II, Duke of Orléans, and Charlotte Desmares

Born c. 1700–1702, (Note: From Madame Palatine's correspondence, it has been thought that Angélique de Froissy was born in 1702, for she was said to be fourteen years old in Madame's letter dated 26 July 1716. Pevitt 1997, p. 55, and Petitfils 2001, p. 73, however, place Froissy's birth c. 1700, the same year Charlotte Aglaé d'Orléans, the Duke of Orleans' third daughter with Françoise Marie de Bourbon, was born.) in Versailles, Angélique was the illegitimate daughter of Philippe II, Duke of Orléans and his mistress, Christine Antoinette Charlotte Desmares (1682–1753), a beautiful actress (tragedienne) of the Théâtre-Français. Charlotte Desmares was a niece of Marie Champmeslé and one of the many mistresses of the then Duke of Chartres, around the time their daughter was born.

Born in 1702 was another illegitimate child of the duke, Jean Philippe d'Orléans, by a lady-in-waiting, Madame d'Argenton. Angélique's half-brother was legitimised in 1706, whereas Angélique was neither acknowledged nor recognized, although Madame du Prat erroneously states in her memoirs that she was recognized on 22 April 1722, the same day as the Abbé de Saint-Albin, another illegitimate son of the Duke of Orléans by his mistress Florence Pellerin. Shortly upon her birth, Froissy was separated from her mother into the Duke of Chartres' care; she was raised at the Palais-Royal and the Abbey of Saint Denis.

She married Henri François, comte de Ségur (1689–1751) at Gagny or Paris on 10 or 12 September 1718. He was the son Henri Joseph, comte de Ségur and Claude Élisabeth Binet.

Called le beau Ségur ("the handsome Ségur"), her husband had been "master of the wardrobe" of the Regent (maître de la garderobe du Régent). He lived in an hôtel in Passy, Paris on a beautiful ten-acre property, which later passed to the Duchess of Valentinois and was named Hôtel de Valentinois after her. (The property is famous for being the residence of Benjamin Franklin for nearly ten years.)

Madame de Ségur belonged to the inner circle of Louis XV's intimates. She is described as "fresh, white, well made, strong and intoxicating".

Angélique died in Paris 1785 at 83 years of age, and was buried at the Église Saint-Eustache, Paris.

== Issue ==
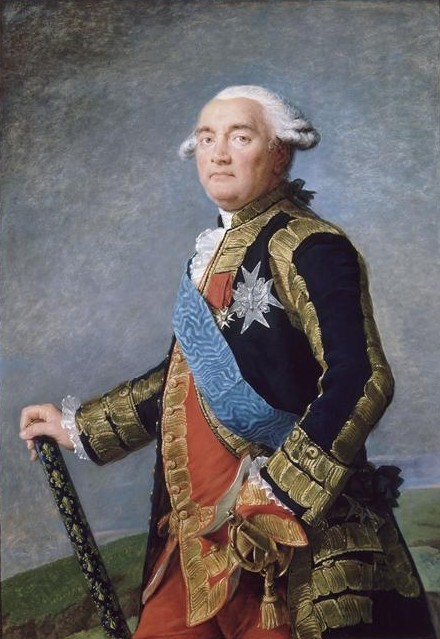
Her son, Philippe Henri, marquis de Ségur.

They had at least five children:

- Philippine Charlotte de Ségur (Paris, 12 July 1719 – Paris, 12 July 1719)
- Henriette Élisabeth de Ségur (Paris, 20 September 1722 – 1747?), unmarried and without issue
- Philippe Henri, marquis de Ségur (Paris, 20 January 1724 – Paris, 3 October 1801), marshal of France in 1783, twin with the below
- Philippe Angélique de Ségur (Paris, 20 January 1724 – Paris, 20 January 1724), twin with the above
- Henriette Césarine de Ségur (1726–1782), married Bertrand Gaich, baron de la Crozes, Knight of Saint-Louis.

== Sources ==
- Petitfils, Jean-Christian (2001) [1986]. Le Régent (in French). Paris: Fayard. ISBN 2-213-01738-7.
- Pevitt, Christine (1997). Philippe, duc d'Orleans. New York: Atlantic Monthly Press. ISBN 0-87113-695-3. OCLC 1150973261 – via the Internet Archive.
- Scott, Virginia (2010). Women on the Stage in Early Modern France: 1540–1750. Cambridge, New York etc.: Cambridge University Press. ISBN 978-0-521-89675-7 – via Google Books.
