= Château de Pitray =

Chateau in southwest France

Coordinates: 44.8999°N 0.02736°W

The Château de Pitray (built in the 17th century) is in the village of Saint-Seurin-de-Prats, Aquitaine, France, overlooking the Dordogne river.

The name comes from Pic du Roy, or king’s peak, since the house was built on an ancient tumulus also known as Mothe de Prats, signifying that it was on land a little higher than the plain. "On 8 August 1626, here I built this home" is engraved in old French on one of the stone building blocks.

It belonged to the Puch family before being acquired by Gabriel de Ségur, seigneur of Pitray. From there it passed on to Pierre de Ségur, son of Thomas, co-seigneur of Pitray, and to his daughter Henriette, married to Alexandre de Puch in 1715, whose descendants remained in possession of the property until 1900. Pierre de Ségur, chevalier of Pitray and a lieutenant in the Koenigsmark Cavalry Regiment, distinguished himself during the dragonnades, or persecutions directed against Protestants during the reign of Louis XIV. Originally the main part of the house consisted of two wings of equal size in the shape of perpendicular rectangles, delimiting the courtyard opening out onto the Dordogne River. Pitray became the property of Doctor Samuel Amanieux at the end of the 19th century and in 1905, a Bordeaux architect joined the two wings by a massive flat-roofed building and an Italianate terrace lined with pilasters.

Over the last 25 years, the Château de Pitray has become a venue appreciated for organizing business meetings and all types of seminars, conferences, and especially concerts.
