= Rue Saint-Florentin, Paris =

Street in Paris, France

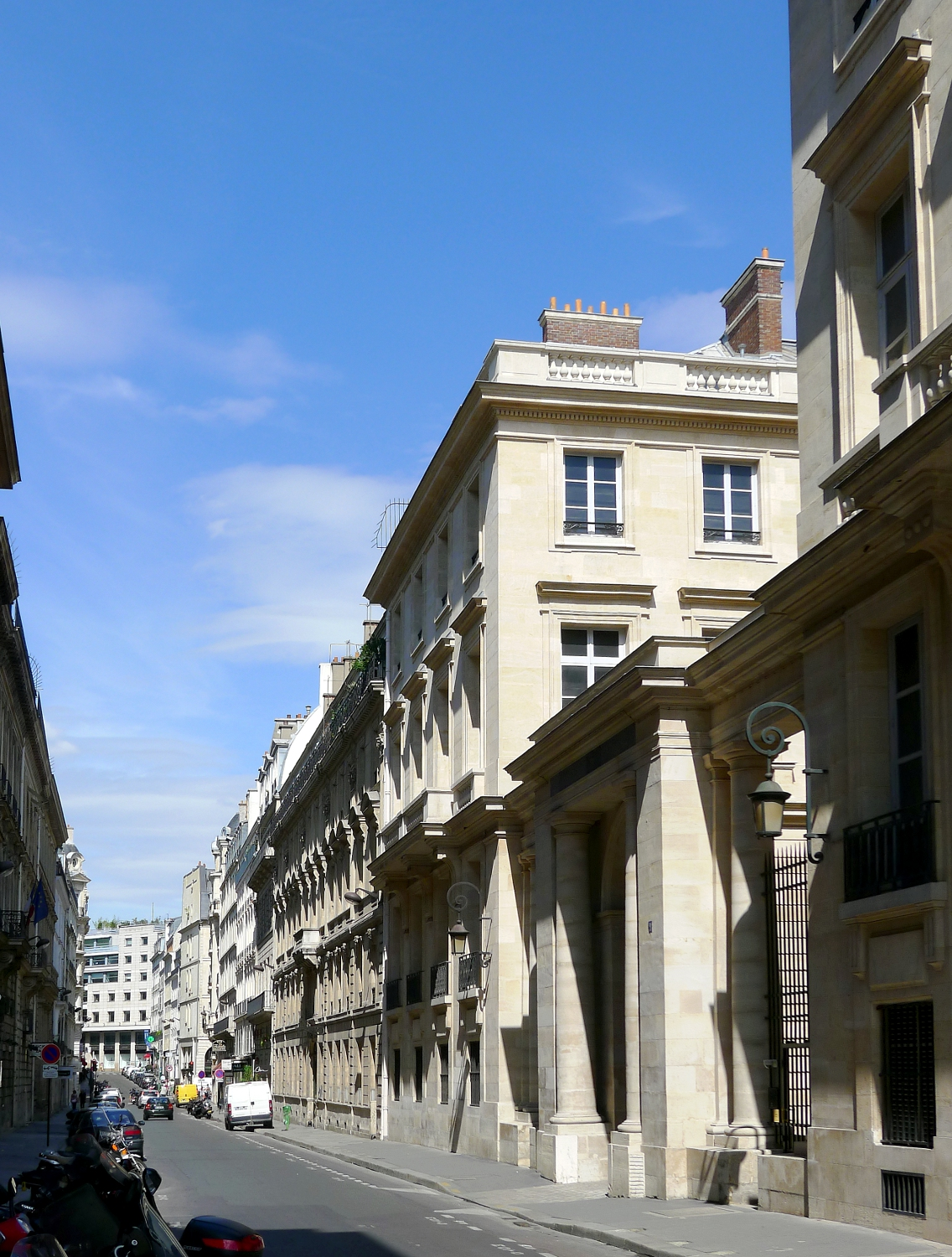
Rue Saint-Florentin. On the right hand side the entrance of the Hôtel Saint-Florentin.

The Rue Saint-Florentin (French pronunciation: [ʁy sɛ̃ flɔʁɑ̃tɛ̃]; "St Florentin Street") is a thoroughfare in the 1st and 8th arrondissement of Paris. The street took its name from the Duc de la Vrillière, Louis Phélypeaux, comte de Saint-Florentin, minister and secretary of state, who had his private mansion built there. For several years, it housed the US Embassy in France, George C. Marshall and William Averell Harriman.

== History ==
The Rue Saint-Florentin was originally a cul-de-sac named "cul-de-sac de l'Orangerie". In 1730, part of the land bordering it (corresponding to the odd numbers) belonged to King Louis XV and the other part (corresponding to the even numbers) to financier Samuel Bernard.

In 1758, when the Place de la Concorde was created, the impasse became the Rue de l'Orangerie. It was also known as the Petite rue des Tuileries.

It begins between 2, place de la Concorde and 258, rue de Rivoli. It ends at 271, rue Saint-Honoré, where it is extended by the Rue du Chevalier-de-Saint-George. The even-numbered side is in the 1st arrondissement, while the odd-numbered side is in the 8th arrondissement.

On the south east side, the street is bordered by the Hôtel Saint-Florentin (also known as Hôtel de l'Infantado and "Hôtel de Talleyrand-Périgord").

== Hôtel Saint-Florentin ==
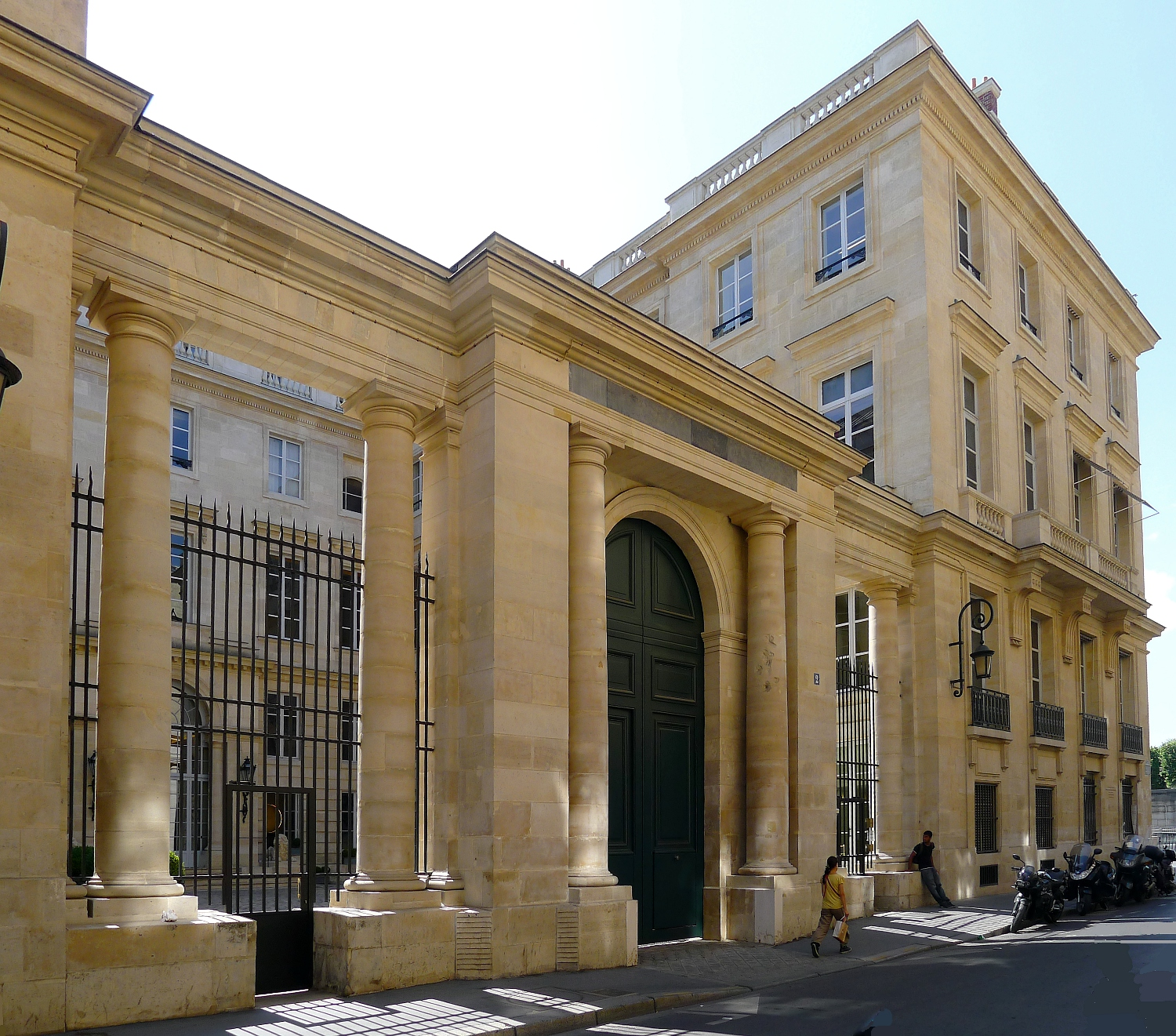
Hôtel Saint-Florentin.

No. 2: Hôtel Saint-Florentin was built for Louis Phélypeaux, comte de Saint-Florentin around 1768 by architect Jean-François-Thérèse Chalgrin, to plans by architect Ange-Jacques Gabriel. In 1777, it was bought by Jacques-Charles de Fitz-James. In 1783, Natalya Golitsyna, who moved to Paris for the children's education, lived there. Maria Anna zu Salm-Salm (1740-1816), widow of the 12th Duke of the Infantado, became the new owner. The Venetian Ambassador Almoro Pisani rented the premises from 1790 until October 1792, when he moved to London. It seems Pétion de Villeneuve lived there until he fled in June 1793 and then Lazare Carnot moved in.

=== 19th century ===
The Spanish consul José Martínez de Hervás became the new owner around 1800. The Prussian ambassador Girolamo Lucchesini lived there in 1801. Charles-Maurice de Talleyrand-Périgord bought it in 1812, and lived there with his mistress Dorothée de Courlande, his daughter Pauline de Talleyrand-Périgord and his cook Marie-Antoine Carême. In 1838, the mansion was sold to James Mayer de Rothschild who never lived there but kept the cook. His son Alphonse lived there with his wife and children. Until 1857 it was rented out to Dorothea Lieven.

=== 20th century ===
Édouard Alphonse de Rothschild inherited the mansion in 1906. In 1939, Jacqueline Piatigorsky - a member of the Rothschild banking family - left France. The mansion was requisitioned by the Naval Ministry of Vichy Government. After the war, it was briefly used by Maurice Thorez. In 1949 George C. Marshall moved in. In November 1950, it was sold to the US Embassy in France. Until 2007, it housed the U.S. Consulate in Paris (first replaced by other departments, then leased to various companies, including the American law firm Jones Day).

== Remarkable buildings and their inhabitants ==
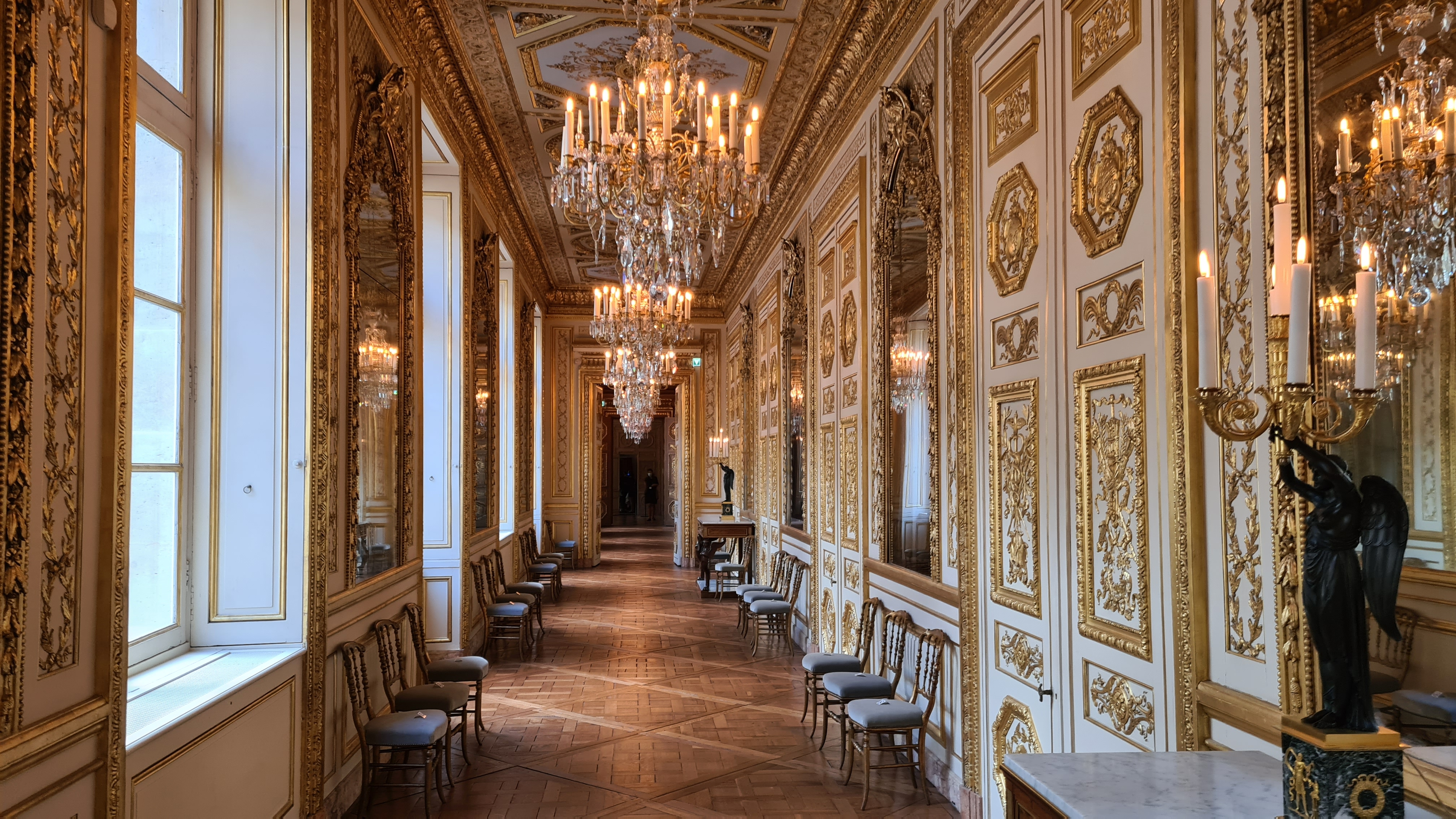
Hôtel de la Marine.

- Nos. 1 and 3: Hôtel du Garde-Meuble with an apartment for Marie-Antoinette; from 1789 Hôtel de la Marine which housed the French Ministry of the Navy and is now the headquarters of the French Navy. New wings were constructed behind the original building, and a neighbouring building at 5 rue Saint-Florentin was purchased in 1855 and added to the Hôtel.
- No. 4: building inhabited by man of letters and theater director Pierre-Barthélemy Gheusi (1865-1943).
- No. 5: Charlotte and Augustin Robespierre, for a brief period in autumn 1792, their brother, Maximilien de Robespierre until he fell ill.
- Nos. 6-8: buildings constructed for personal use by Jacques-Guillaume Legrand and Jacques Molinos in 1789. On the façade, capitals bear the associated figures, "LM", of the two architects and casts of the Innocents Fountain at no. 6, whose dismantling Legrand and Molinos had supervised. In the building, they founded the Musée de l'Ordre Dorique, which featured a scale reproduction of two Parthenon columns in one of the two courtyards.
- No. 7: Hôtel Le Maître, built by Louis Le Tellier in 1768. Adélaïde de Souza, a woman of letters and mother of Charles, comte de Flahaut and a son of Talleyrand, lived in this hotel from 1829. The hotel was home to Ferdinand de Lesseps. In 1914, couturier Jean Patou opened his haute couture house there and, in 1921, commissioned decorator architect Louis Süe to make alterations. Today, it houses the offices of the French Human Rights Ombudsman.
- No. 9: Hôtel de Ségur, built by Louis Le Tellier in 1768. Until his expropriation during the French Revolution, Maréchal Philippe Henri, Marquis de Ségur lived in the house. Both of his sons, Louis Philippe, Comte de Ségur, and Joseph-Alexandre Pierre, Vicomte de Ségur, were born there. The general and historian Philippe Paul, comte de Ségur lived there at the beginning of the First Empire. Under the July Monarchy, the hotel was occupied by General Baudrand (1774-1848), peer de France. Prince Józef Michał Poniatowski, an opera singer lived there during the Second Empire. Misia Sert and Thadée Natanson lived at this address after their marriage in 1893, until their divorce in 1905. In 1910, it belonged to the Marquis de Las Cases.
- No. 11: Hôtel de Chiverny, built in 1702, rebuilt in 1767 for Jean-Baptiste Bersin. It belonged to his daughter Claude Angélique Bersin, married in 1747 to Marquis Anne Emmanuel de Crussol d'Ambroise. Charles, marquis de La Valette, Minister of Foreign Affairs under the Second Empire, lived and died there.
- No. 13: in 1830-1833 inhabited by James Fenimore Cooper. In 1910 by Gaston Jollivet (1842-1927), man of letters, and Victor de Cottens (1862-1956). playwright.

== Gallery ==
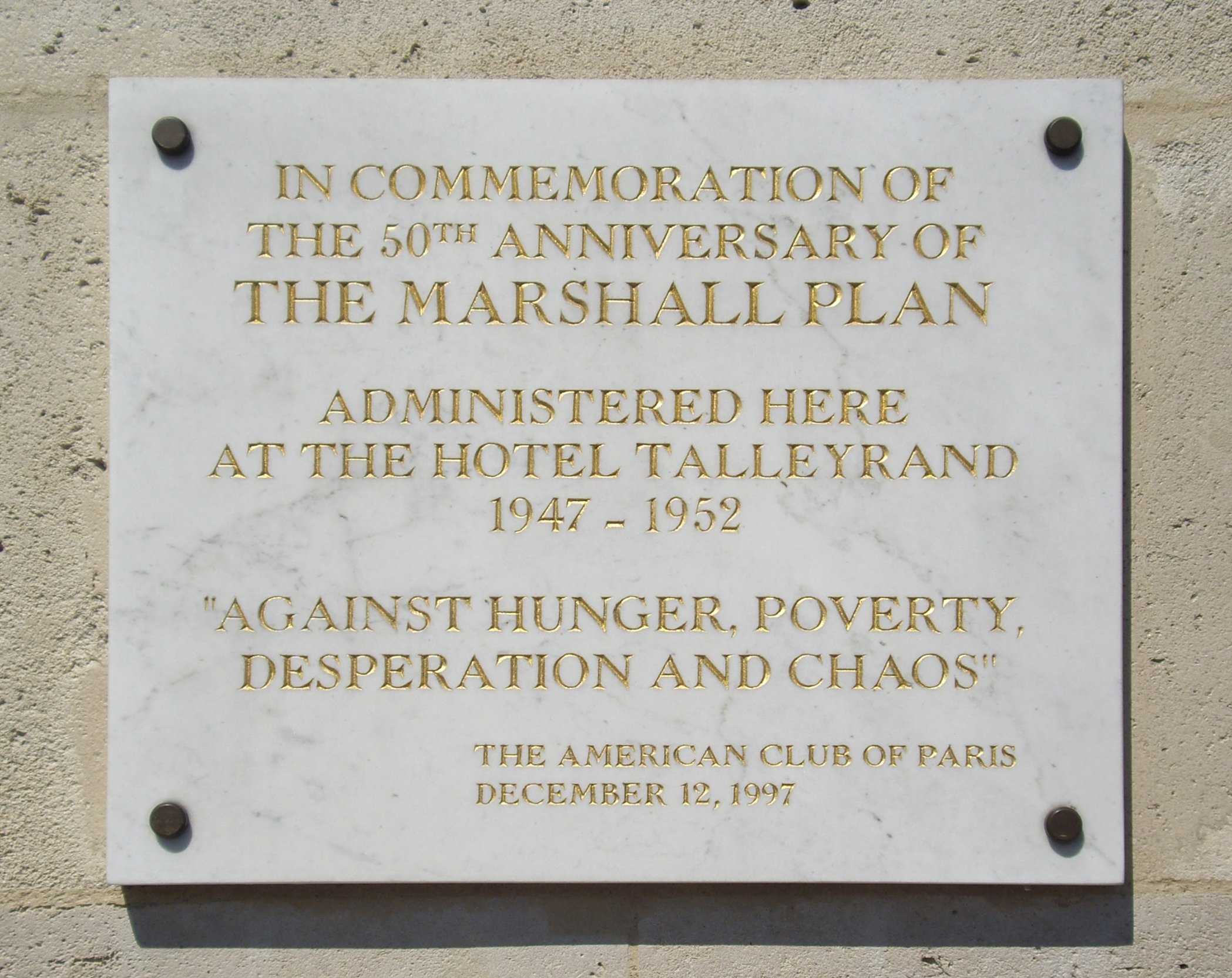
Marshall Plan, Hôtel Talleyrand

Turgot Map (1730s)

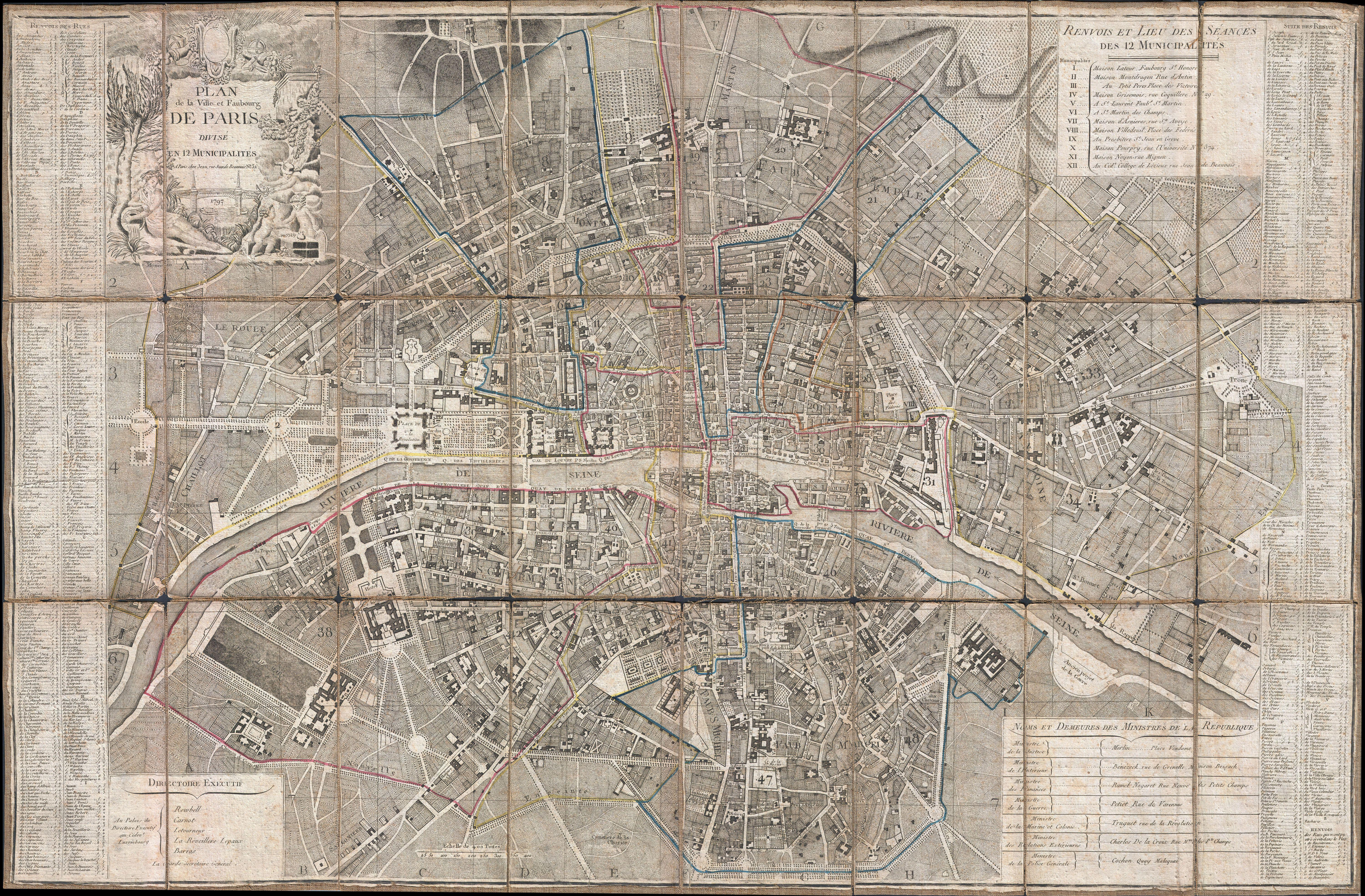
Map of 1797

Atlas of Jacoubet (1836)

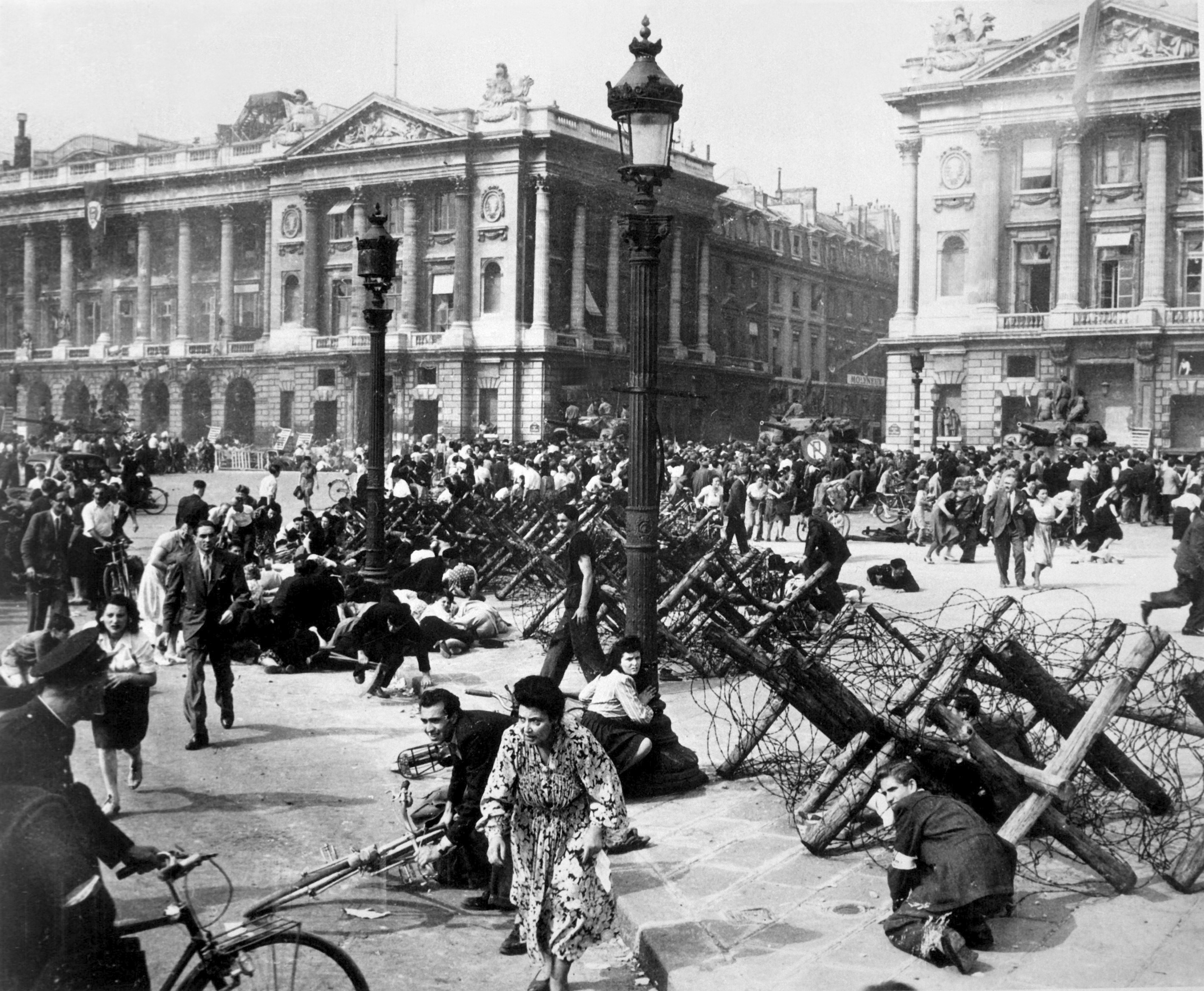
Crowds celebrating the liberation of Paris scatter from German sniper fire August 1944. The Rue Saint-Florentin is in the background.

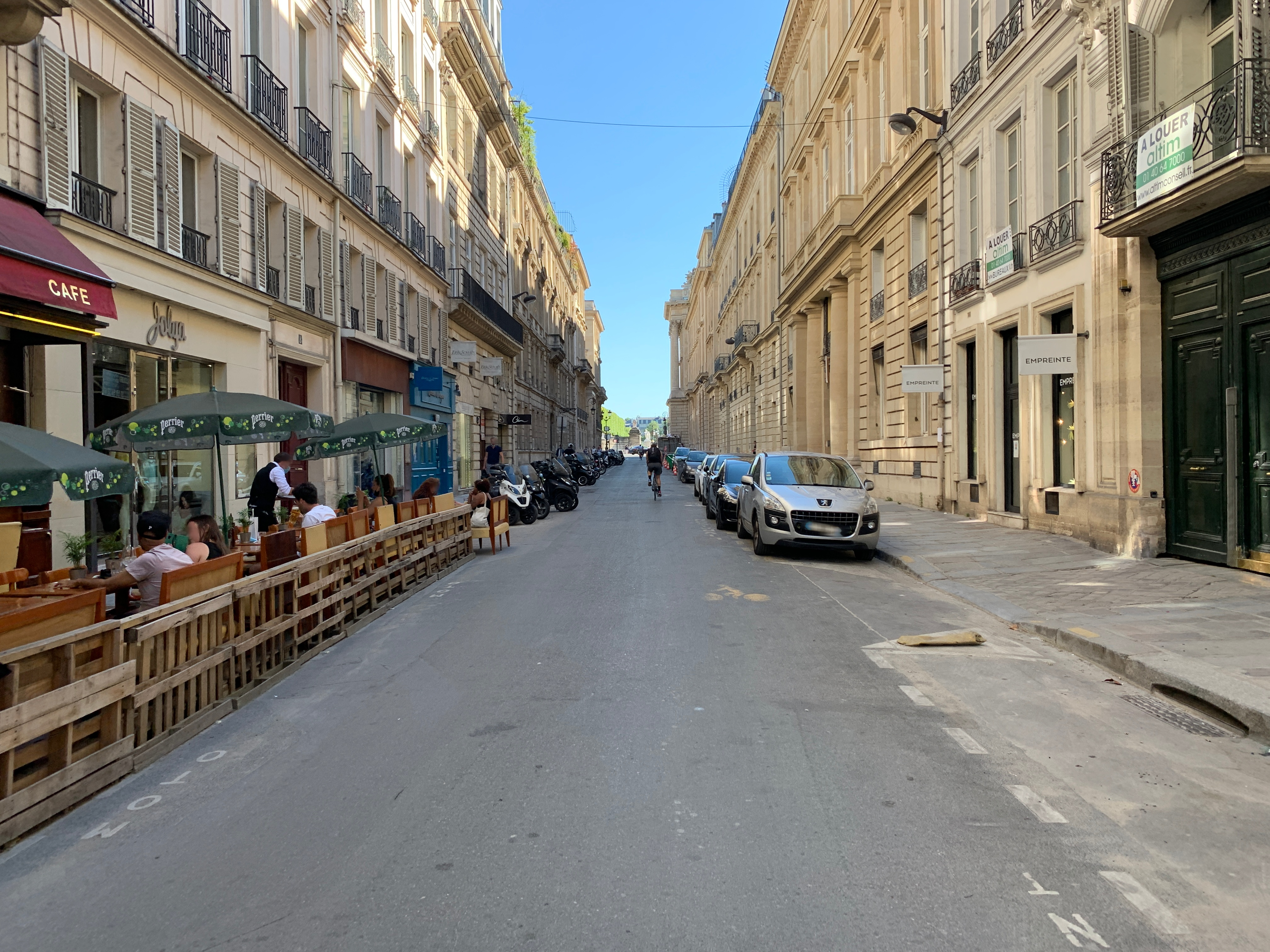
Rue Saint-Florentin (2021)

== Source ==
- Paris révolutionnaire

Media related to Rue Saint-Florentin (Paris) at Wikimedia Commons
