= Florence (actor) =

French actor (1749–1816)

Nicolas-Joseph Billot de La Ferrière, stage-name Florence (French: [nikɔla ʒozɛf bijo də la fɛʁjɛʁ]; 4 March 1749, Léry - 25 June 1816, rue Traversière, Paris) was a French actor.

He began his career in 1771 at the Théâtre de la Monnaie in Brussels, and moved to Versailles in 1777 in Mme Montansier's company. On 21 January 1777, he made his debut in the roles of Darviane in Mélanide and the Marquis in La Pupille.

Following his anonymous début at the Comédie-Française, he was received into its company after a second on 7 May 1778. He was admitted as a sociétaire in April 1779, and devoted the next 25 years to the Comédie-Française's interests, making them forget his lack of talent.

Imprisoned with several other actors during the Reign of Terror, he owed his safe release to La Bussière. He retired in 1804 and died in 1816.
