= Battle of Pfaffenhofen =

Battle of the Austrian succession, 1745

- Part of the War of the Austrian Succession
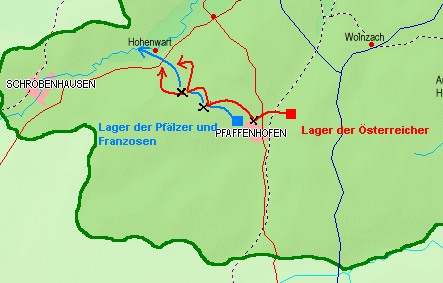
- The retreat of the French troops
Date	15 April 1745
Location	Pfaffenhofen an der Ilm, present-day Upper Bavaria, Germany
Result	Austrian victory

Belligerents
Austria	France (Electorate of Bavaria) Bavaria and German allies

Commanders and leaders
(Habsburg monarchy) Karl Josef Batthyány	(Kingdom of France) General Ségur

Strength
10,000	7,000

Casualties and losses
800	2,400

The Battle of Pfaffenhofen was fought on 15 April 1745 between France and Austria. The Austrians under Karl Josef Batthyány defeated the outnumbered French under General Ségur, ending the war in Bavaria.

== Prelude ==
In October 1744, the Franco-Bavarian army had succeeded, in coordination with Prussia, to expel the Austrians from Bavaria, and to reinstate Charles VII, Prince-elector of Bavaria and Holy Roman Emperor, in his capital Munich. Here he died 3 months later.
His 18-year-old son and heir Maximilian III Joseph wavered between the Peace-party, led by his mother Maria Amalia, Holy Roman Empress and Army Commander Friedrich Heinrich von Seckendorff and the War-party, led by Foreign Minister General Ignaz von Törring and the French envoy Chavigny.

This hampered the ongoing peace negotiations, so Maria Theresia ordered the Austrian Army to start a new offensive to put pressure on the Bavarian negotiators. Amberg and Vilshofen were taken and the Bavarian army under Törring and its French, Hessian and Palatinate allies were pushed on the defensive.

Törring decided to pull back his Bavarian and Hessian troops behind the Lech River. The French Army commander Henri François de Ségur was not informed of this manoeuver and waited unaware and unprotected near Pfaffenhofen on Palatinate reinforcements under General Zastrow, which arrived on 14 April. The next day Segur decided to also pull back behind the Lech.
The Austrians, aware of the isolated French position, had by then reached Pfaffenhofen with a force larger than the French.

== Battle ==
First the Austrians attacked the town of Pfaffenhofen and were met by French fire. But the Austrians took the town in house-to-house combat in which the fierce Croatian Pandurs inflicted heavy casualties on the French defenders.

Meanwhile, François de Ségur had hastily improvised a defensive position around a hill west of the city. But, when more and more Austrian troops, including the main force under Batthyány, reached the battlefield, de Ségur was forced twice to withdraw his army, to avoid encirclement. When the sign for a general withdrawal was given, panic broke out amongst the Palatinate troops and they fled. de Ségur had the greatest difficulty in preventing the panic spreading amongst his French troops.

The retreating army was harassed by the Pandur and Hussar light cavalry, which inflicted many casualties.

Only after the French and Palatinates had crossed the Paar river at Hohenwart at 18:00, the Austrians gave up their pursuit. The defeated army reached Rain on the Lech the next day at 11:00 at set up camp. But the next morning the Austrian army appeared and the allies fled over the Lech River, leaving all its material behind. Only the burning down of the bridge prevented a total disaster for the allies.

de Ségur had lost many troops and material, but his maintenance of discipline had prevented the total destruction of his army.

== Consequences ==
The day after the defeat, Törring was dismissed and the Peace-party prevailed. One week later, Maximilian III Joseph concluded the Treaty of Füssen with Austria.

Maximilian recognized the Pragmatic Sanction. He also abandoned his father's claims on Bohemia and the imperial crown and promised to support the imperial candidacy of Maria Theresa's husband, Francis Stephen of Lorraine, who in fact became the next Emperor on 13 September 1745.

The Battle of Pfaffenhofen eliminated Bavaria-Bohemia as one of the four theaters of War the Austrians had to fight on, releasing troops for the war in Silesia, Italy and the Austrian Netherlands.
