= Joseph-Alexandre Pierre de Ségur, Viscount of Ségur =

French military officer, poet, songwriter and playwright

- Joseph-Alexandre Pierre de Ségur, portrayed by Jean-Baptiste Le Tellier
- Born: 14 April 1756; Hôtel de Ségur, Paris, France
- Died: 26 July 1805 (aged 49); Bagnères-de-Bigorre, France
- Noble family: House of Ségur
- Issue: Alexandre Félix de Ségur (30 April 1781 – 16 January 1805); Mother: Louise Julie Careau; Alexandre Joseph de Ségur (21 January 1793 – 28 April 1864); Mother: Reine Claude de Mesmes d'Avaux, Comtesse d'Avaux, née Chartraire de Bourbonne, Dame de Bourbonne-les-Bains (1764–1812)
- Father: Legally: Philippe Henri, Marquis de Ségur; Reality: Pierre Victor, Baron de Besenval de Brunstatt
- Mother: Louise-Anne-Madeleine, Marquise de Ségur, née de Vernon (1729–1778)

Joseph-Alexandre Pierre, Vicomte de Ségur (1756–1805), was a French military officer, politician, poet, songwriter and playwright.

== Early life and career ==
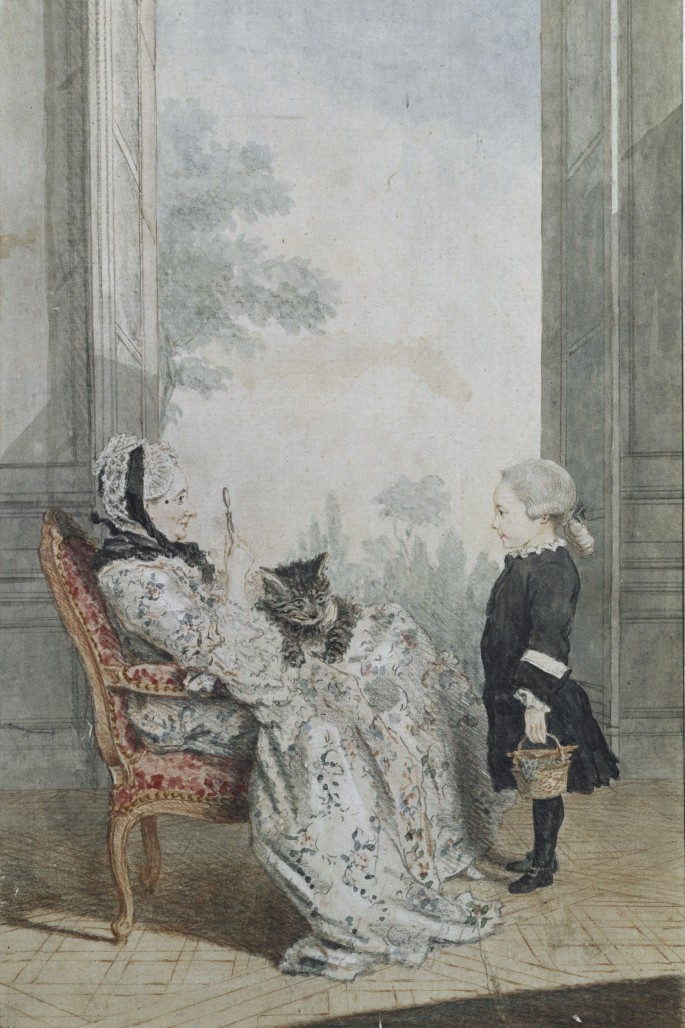
Joseph-Alexandre Pierre, Vicomte de Ségur, with his official grandmother Philippa Angélique, Comtesse de Ségur, née de Froissy, who was herself an illegitimate child, portrayed by Louis Carrogis Carmontelle in 1763. The Vicomte de Ségur's real grandmother on his father's side was Katarzyna, Baronne de Besenval de Brunstatt, née Bielińska (1684–1761).

Joseph-Alexandre Pierre de Ségur was born in Paris as the son of Maréchal Philippe Henri, Marquis de Ségur, and Louise-Anne-Madeleine, Marquise de Ségur, née de Vernon (1729–1778).

Like his elder brother, Louis Philippe, Comte de Ségur, Joseph-Alexandre Pierre de Ségur was born at the family's hôtel particulier in Paris, the Hôtel de Ségur at 9 Rue Saint-Florentin.

=== The baron's son ===
In reality, however, Joseph-Alexandre Pierre de Ségur was the son of his father's best friend: Pierre Victor, Baron de Besenval de Brunstatt, usually just referred to as Baron de Besenval (the suffix Brunstatt refers to the former barony). Thus, he was the half-brother of Louis Philippe, Comte de Ségur. The fact that the Baron de Besenval was his father was no secret within the family.

=== Officer, politician and poet ===
Joseph-Alexandre Pierre de Ségur was Colonel of the Regiments of Noailles and Lorraine, and of the Dragoons of Ségur during the Ancien Régime. In 1788 he was promoted to Maréchal de camp.

In 1789, the Vicomte de Ségur was elected a deputy for the nobility of Paris for the États généraux. He remained loyal to the king and the monarchy but participated very little in the debates. In 1790, he retired from political life and occupied himself with literature, publishing dramas and comedies.

=== Hôtel de Ségur or Hôtel Bonaparte ===
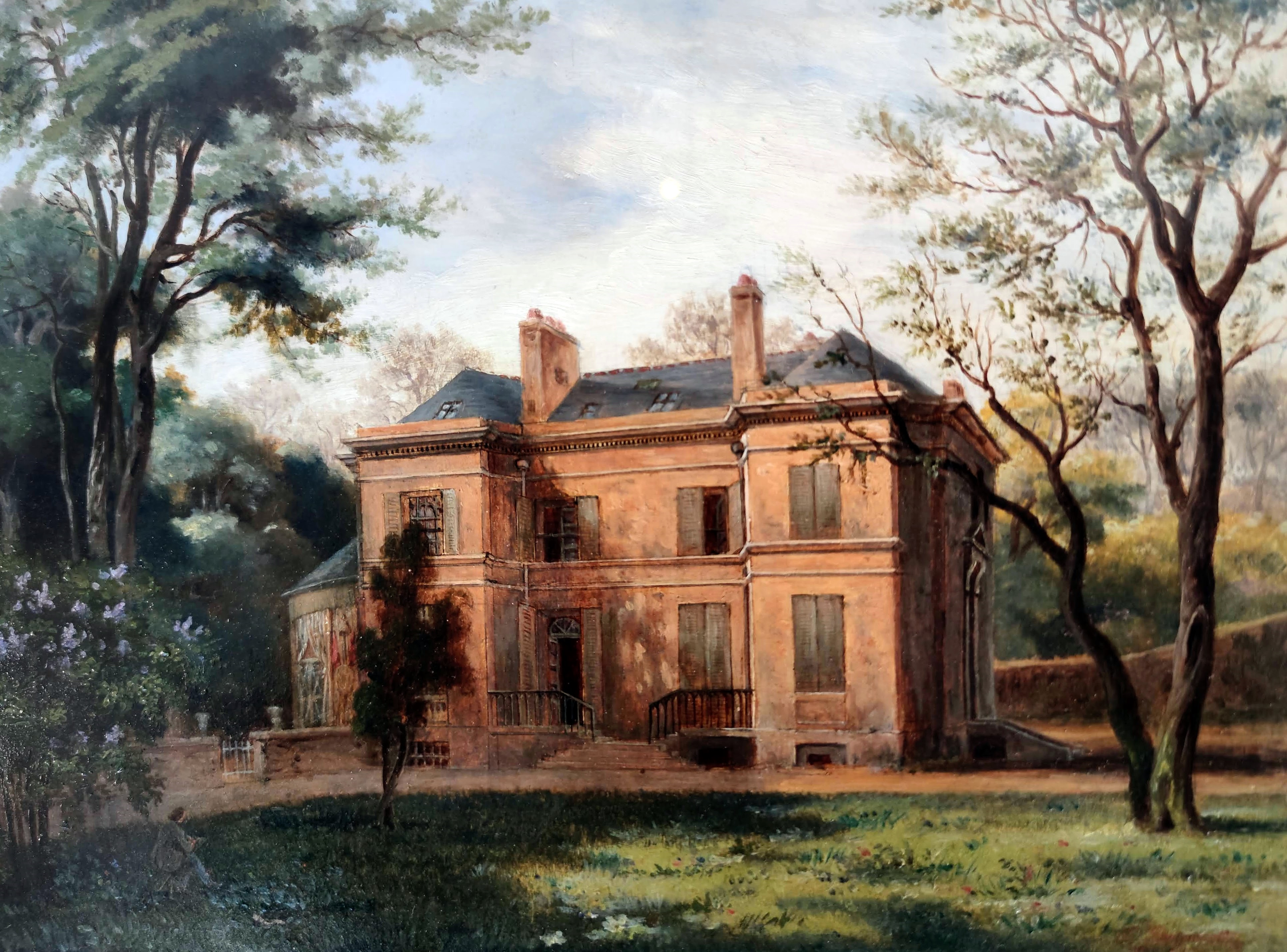
The Vicomte de Ségur's hôtel particulier at 6 Rue Chantereine, the house that he had either rented or received from his father, the Baron de Besenval. The house became famous as the Hôtel Bonaparte, painted by Charles-Nicolas Ransonnette.

Already in 1780, the Baron de Besenval had bought a hôtel particulier at 6 Rue Chantereine for his son, Joseph-Alexandre Pierre de Ségur, or at least the baron financed his son's living there. The house was built by the architect François-Victor Perrard de Montreuil (1742–1821). This was the house where Joseph-Alexandre Pierre de Ségur lived with his then mistress Louise Julie Careau.

==== Hôtel Bonaparte ====
When the relationship between Joseph-Alexandre Pierre de Ségur and Louise Julie Careau ended at the end of the 1780s, the Vicomte de Ségur either left the house to Louise Julie Careau or he simply moved out and let her live there with their son Alexandre Félix de Ségur (1781–1805). In August 1795, Louise Julie Careau rented it to Joséphine de Beauharnais, the later wife of Napoléon Bonaparte. On 26 March 1798, Napoléon acquired the hôtel particulier for his wife Joséphine. Because of the connection with Napoléon Bonaparte, the house later became known as the Hôtel Bonaparte.

== Revolutionary years ==
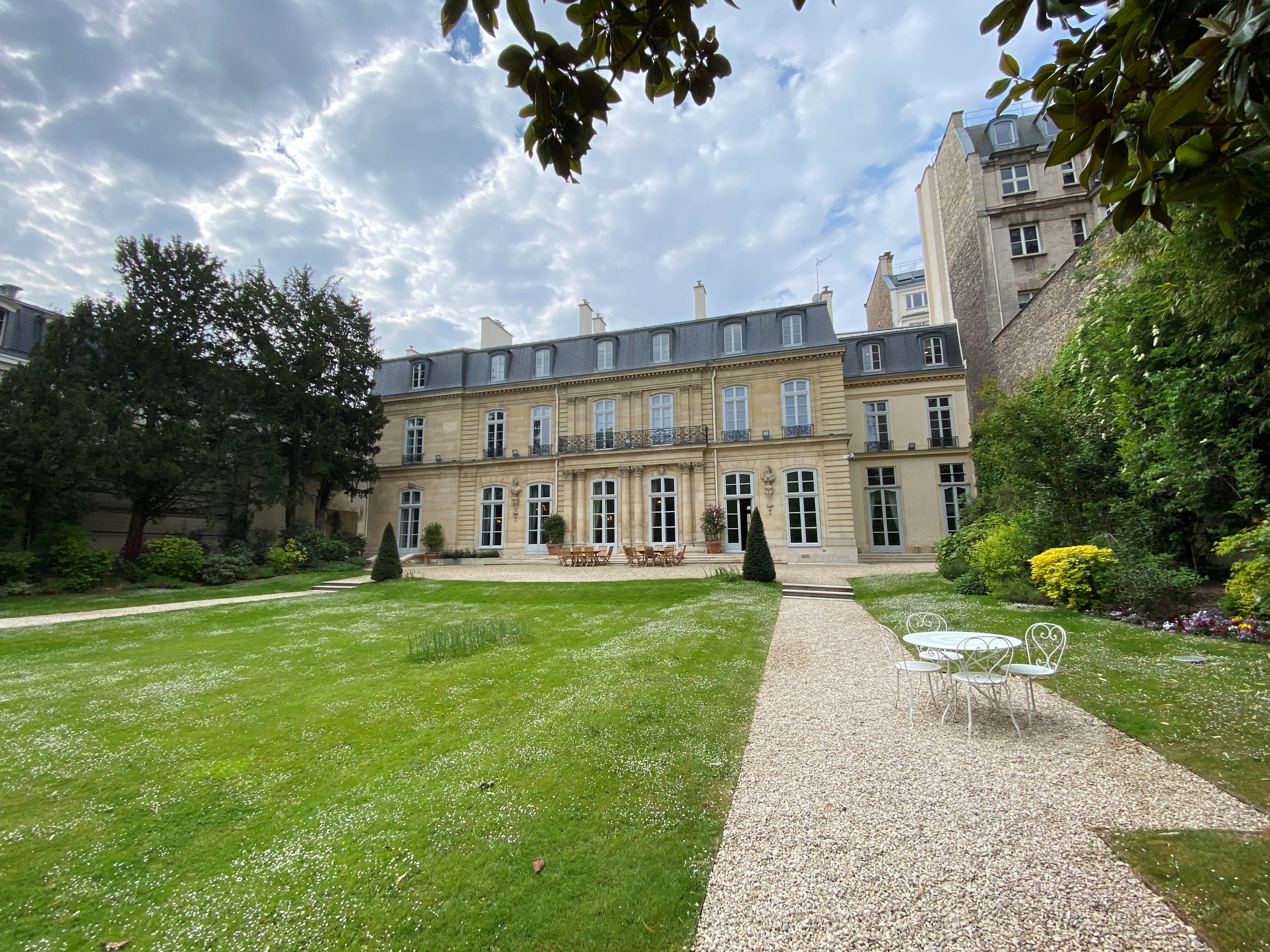
In 1791, Joseph-Alexandre Pierre de Ségur inherited the bare ownership of the Hôtel de Besenval, using it as the editorial headquarters for the monarchist newspaper La Feuille du jour, which he published together with the journalist Pierre-Germain Parisau and Jean-Baptiste-Denis Després.

After the death of his father, Pierre Victor, Baron de Besenval, in 1791, Joseph-Alexandre Pierre de Ségur inherited the bare ownership of the Hôtel de Besenval.

During the Reign of Terror of the French Revolution, Joseph-Alexandre Pierre de Ségur was suspected of being a counter-revolutionary pamphleteer. On 13 October 1793, he and his secretary, Jean-Baptiste-Denis Després, were arrested at the Hôtel de Besenval and imprisoned in the Port-Libre prison, as were André Chénier and other artists and writers of the time. A friend of theirs, the actor Charles de La Buissière, managed to get himself employed at the Bureau of the Committee for Public Health. Charles de La Buissière destroyed the accusation file for Joseph-Alexandre Pierre de Ségur along with those of many other personalities of the Parisian scene, saving their lives. On 28 July 1794, Joseph-Alexandre Pierre de Ségur was released.

=== Les dîners du Vaudeville ===
From 1796 to the end of 1801, the Vicomte de Ségur participated in the activities of the Société: Les dîners du Vaudeville, a singing society, where he was known as Ségur le jeune (Ségur the younger), along with his brother Louis Philippe, Comte de Ségur, known as Ségur l'ainé (Ségur the elder). Joseph-Alexandre Pierre de Ségur, his brother Louis Philippe and Louis Philippe's father Philippe Henri, Marquis de Ségur, as well as Jean-Baptiste-Denis Després, the Vicomte de Ségur's secretary, were founding members of the society, which was founded on 23 September 1796.

== Last years ==
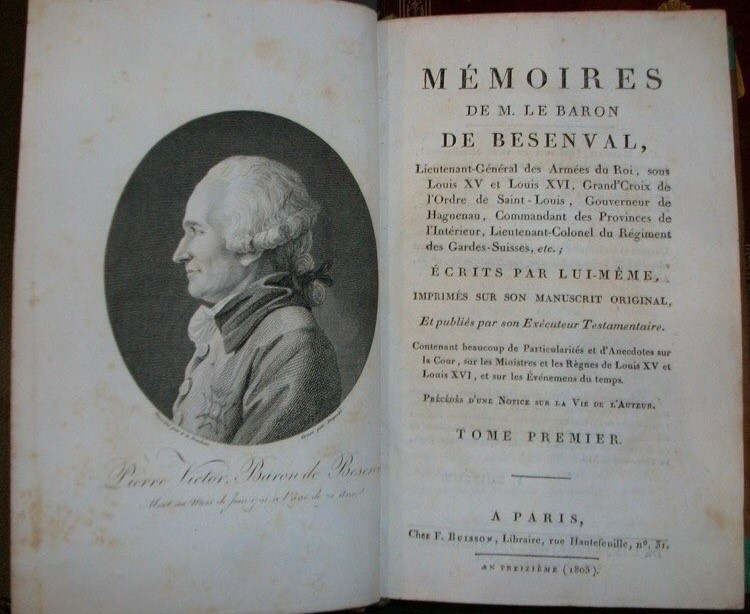
The frontispiece of the first edition of the memoirs of the Baron de Besenval showing his portrait. The memoirs were published by Joseph-Alexandre Pierre de Ségur between 1805 and 1806 in four volumes.

Like his father, the Baron de Besenval, Joseph-Alexandre Pierre de Ségur was never married. He died while he was recovering from a chest illness at Bagnères-de-Bigorre in the company of Reine Claude de Mesmes d'Avaux, Comtesse d'Avaux, née Chartraire de Bourbonne, Dame de Bourbonne-les-Bains (1764–1810), a rich divorced heiress who was his partner for twelve years. The Comtesse d'Avaux, Dame de Bourbonne-les-Bains, was the owner of the thermal springs of the same name. She had large real estate holdings, including several country houses for her private use. After renting out his Hôtel de Besenval in 1795 and selling it in 1797, the Vicomte de Ségur also benefited from the various residences of the Comtesse d'Avaux, as he lived with her in a marriage-like relationship.

Like his son, Alexandre Félix de Ségur (1781–1805), the Vicomte de Ségur also died of tuberculosis. His last posthumous publication, the memoirs of his father, Pierre Victor, Baron de Besenval, caused a scandal in the high society of the time.

"My brother, the Vicomte de Ségur, was among the most benevolent and kindly men of his age."

— Louis Philippe, Comte de Ségur

== Literary works (partial list) ==
- Correspondance secrète de Ninon de l'Enclos, Paris, Le Jay (1789), compilées et publiées par Joseph-Alexandre Pierre de Ségur
- La femme jalouse, Paris, chez Henry (1790)
- Le Retour du Mari, comédie en un acte et en vers, Paris, Gattey (1792)
- Le fou par amour, Drame historique, en un acte et en vers, Paris (1797)
- Essai sur les moyens de plaire en amour, Paris, Huet (1797)
- Élize dans les bois, fait historique du 14 thermidor, comédie en un acte et en prose, Paris, Huet (1797)
- L'opéra comique, opera-comique en un acte, en prose et ariettes, Avignon, frères Bonnet (1798)
- C'est la même, vaudeville en un acte, Paris, Huet (1798)
- Les femmes, leur condition et leur influence dans l'ordre social chez différents peuples anciens et modernes, Paris, Treuttel et Würtz (1803)
