= Crimean journey of Catherine the Great =

1787 visit to the newly acquired New Russia and Crimea

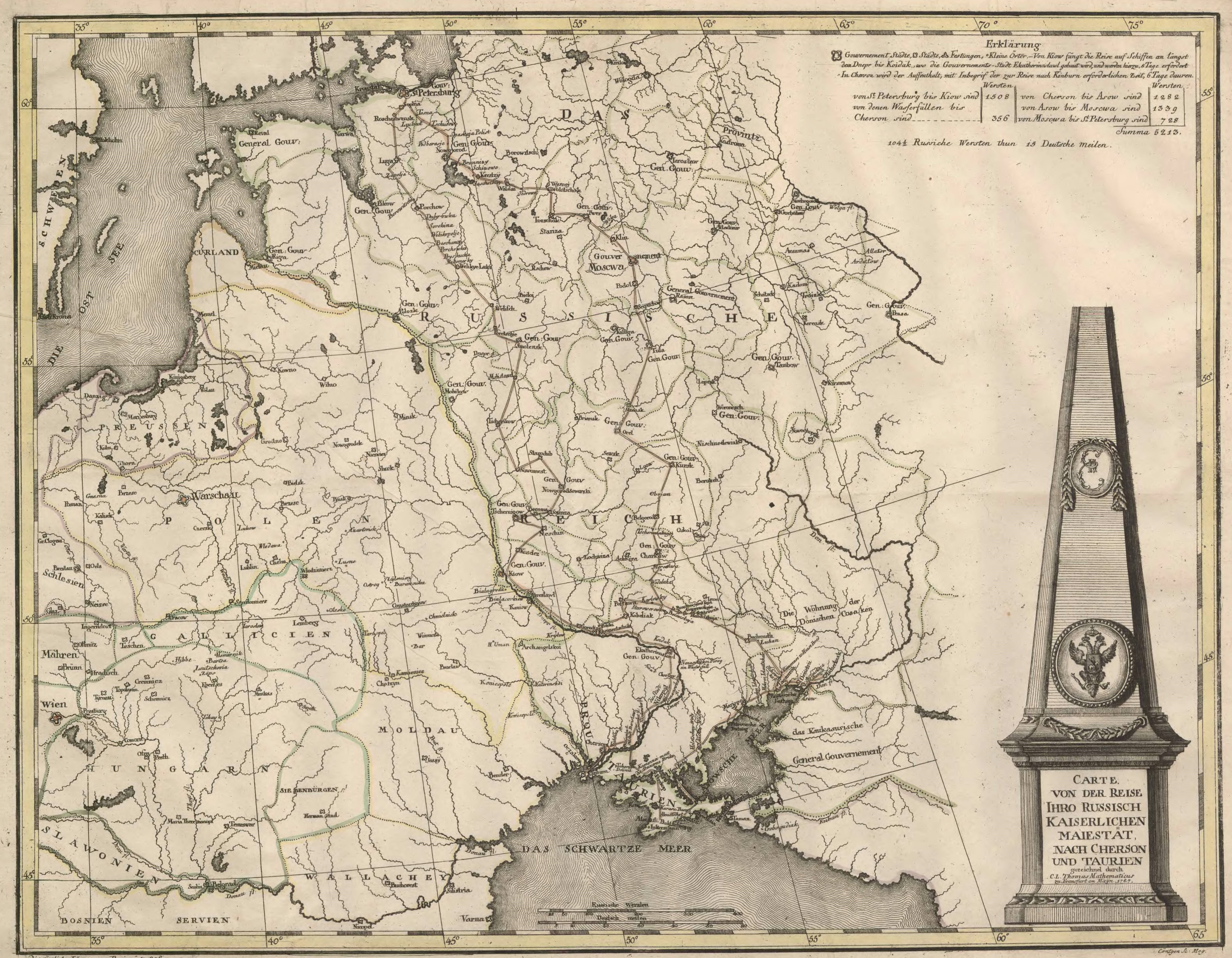
Map of Catherine the Great's Crimean journey.

The Crimean journey of Catherine the Great (Russian: Путешествие Екатерины II в Крым), also known as Таврический вояж (Taurida Voyage) at the time, was a six-month (January 2, 1787 – July 11, 1787) inspection journey of Catherine II of Russia to the newly acquired lands of New Russia and Crimea, gained as a result of the victorious wars against the Ottoman Empire (1735–1739 and 1768–1774) and peace treaties with the Cossack Hetmanate followed by the forced liquidation of the free Zaporozhian Sich.

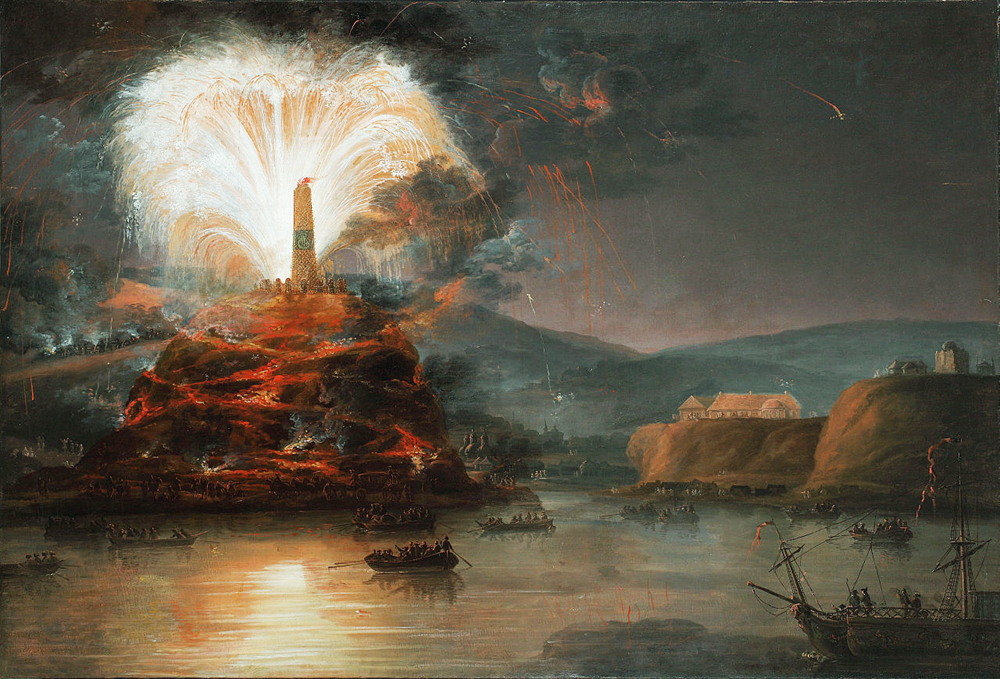
A night illumination in honour of Catherine the Great on the Dnieper River.

The journey was carried out with her court and several ambassadors. Among them was the French ambassador, Louis Philippe, Comte de Ségur. During the journey, she met with Joseph II, the Holy Roman Emperor, who was traveling incognito. The journey was arranged by Prince Grigory Potemkin, a favorite and former lover of Catherine II. The journey happened just prior to the Russo-Turkish War (1787–1792).

"Her Majesty gave me to understand that on this journey all formalities were to be laid aside, and that only a select few would enjoy the honour of taking part."

— Louis Philippe, Comte de Ségur, on the invitation he had received from Catherine the Great of Russia to accompany her on her journey to Crimea

This journey is the origin of the expression Potemkin village, referring to the legend of fake villages hastily erected by Potemkin along Catherine's route in order to impress her.
