= Pierre de Ségur =

French writer and historian (1853–1916)

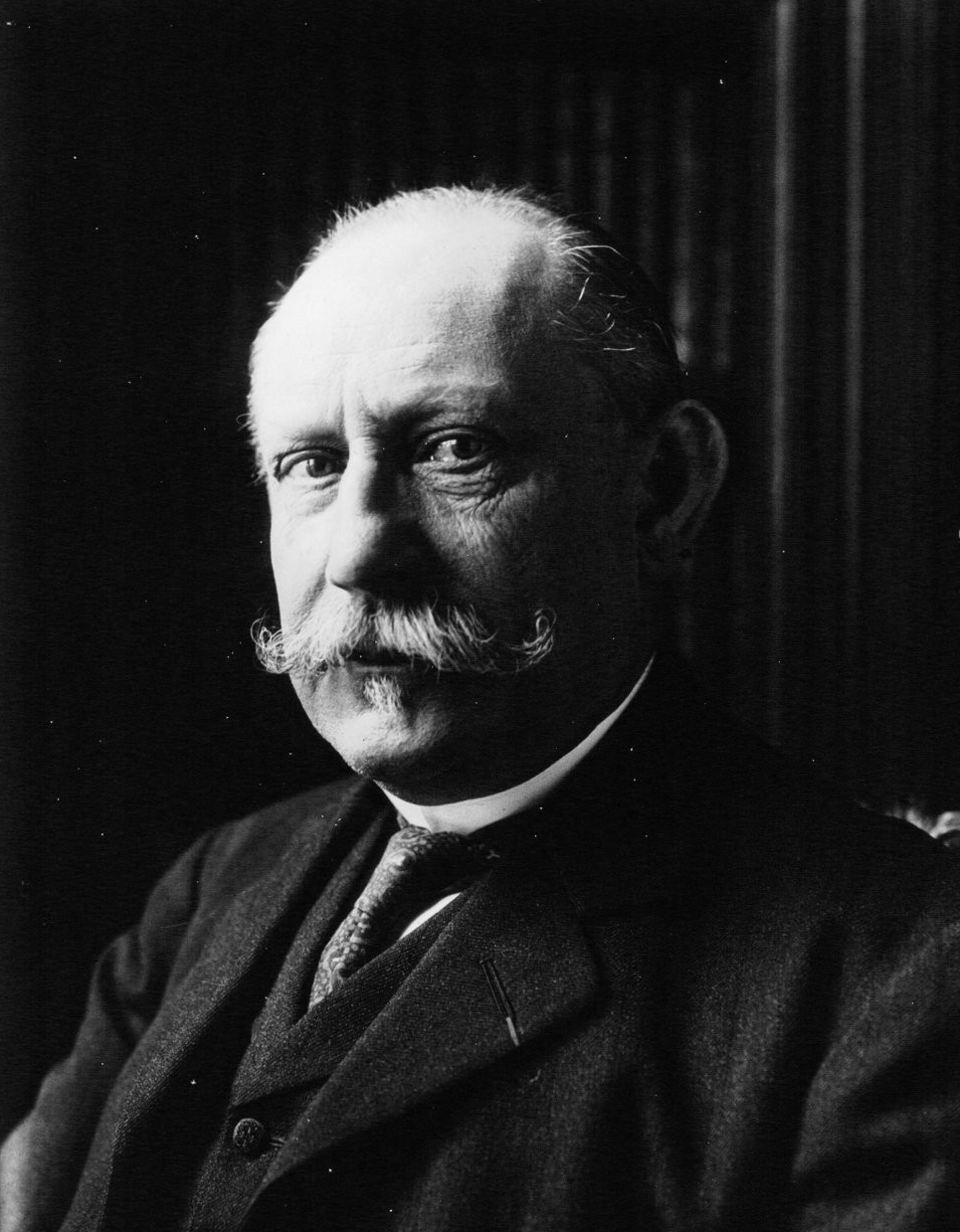
Pierre de Ségur in 1914

Pierre-Marie-Maurice-Henri, marquis de Ségur (13 February 1853 in Paris – 13 August 1916 in Poissy) was a French writer and historian, elected a member of the Académie française in 1907. He was the eldest son of Anatole, marquis de Ségur, and Cécile Cuvelier; and thus the grandson of Sophie Rostopchine, Comtesse de Ségur.

== Works ==
- Le maréchal de Ségur, 1895
- La dernière des Condé, 1899
- Jeunesse du maréchal de Luxembourg, 1900
- Gens d'autrefois, 1903
- Parmi les cyprès et les lauriers, 1912
