= Octave, comte de Ségur =

French nobleman and soldier (1779–1818)

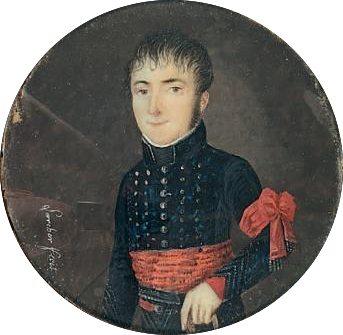
Octave-Henri Gabriel, comte de Ségur

Octave-Henri Gabriel, comte de Ségur (5 June 1779 – 15 August 1818) was a French soldier and famous suicide.

He was born in Paris, the eldest son of Louis Philippe, comte de Ségur and Antoinette Élisabeth d'Aguesseau.

He married on 13 March 1797 his cousin Marie Félicité d'Aguesseau, who died in Paris on 16 January 1847, and had three children:

- Eugène Henri Raymond, comte de Ségur (Fresnes-sur-Marne, Seine-et-Marne, 12 February 1798 - Château de Méry-sur-Oise, 15 July 1869), married on 13/14 July 1819 Countess Sophie Feodorovna Rostopchine (Saint Petersburg, 1 August 1799 - Paris, 9 February 1874), and had seven children, including Nathalie de Ségur. Eugène and Sophie were also the paternal grandparents of Pierre de Ségur.
- Adolphe Louis Marie, vicomte de Ségur-Lamoignon (Paris, 31 August 1800 - Château de Méry-sur-Oise, 30 November 1876), married 15 October 1823 Marie Louise Augustine Félicité de Lamoignon (Paris, 18 December 1805 - Paris, 18 February 1860), without issue
- Raymond Jean Paul, comte de Ségur d' Aguesseau (Paris, 18 February 1803 - Château d' Oléac, Hautes-Pyrénées, 13 February 1889), married firstly Rome, 5 February 1825 Nadine Schwetchine-Luz-St-Sauveur (? - 15 July 1836), and had three children, and married secondly 20 April 1845 Valentine, Princess Lubomirska (12 March 1817 - Château d' Oléac, Hautes-Pyrénées, 31 January 1889), and had six children

He committed suicide in Paris.
