= Florence Pellerin =

French ballet dancer and courtesan

Florence Pellerin (fl. 1707), was a French ballet dancer and courtesan. She was the official mistress of Philippe II, Duke of Orléans, who was the regent of France during the minority of the infant King Louis XV. She was the mistress of the duke in 1696–1699.

She was engaged in the ballet of the Paris Opera under the stage name "Mademoiselle Florence". She was described as beautiful but not regarded to be very intelligent or entertaining, and the duke eventually tired of her and left her for Charlotte Desmares.

After, she became the official favorite of Louis II de Rohan-Chabot (1679–1738), son of Louis, Duke of Rohan, who caused a scandal by their open relationship, spending a fortune on her and having several children with her. The scandal caused the King to have her imprisoned in a convent by a lettre de cachet.

Issue

With Philippe II, Duke of Orléans:

- Charles de Saint-Albin, dit l'Abbé d'Orléans, Archbishop of Cambrai, legitimized in 1706 (Paris, 1698 – Paris, 1764, bur Paris)

With Louis II de Rohan-Chabot:

- several illegitimate children
