= Ken Billot =

New Zealand footballer

Personal information
- Full name: Ken G Billot
- Place of birth: New Zealand
- Position: Defender

Senior career*
Years	Team	Apps	(Gls)
- Mount Wellington

International career
1980	New Zealand	2	(0)
- * Club domestic league appearances and goals

Ken Billot (/ˈkɛn biˈloʊ/ bee-LOH) is a former association football player who represented New Zealand at international level.

Billot played two official A-international matches for the New Zealand in 1980, the first as a substitute in a 4–0 win over Mexico on 20 August 1980, the second starting in a 0–3 loss to Canada on 18 September 1980.
