= Nicolas-Alexandre, marquis de Ségur =

Nicolas-Alexandre
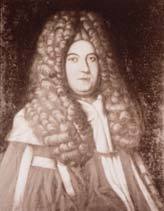
- Image of the marquis de Ségur
- Born: 1695; France
- Died: 1755 (aged 59–60); France
- Occupation: Bordeaux wine maker
- Parent(s): Alexandre de Ségur de Francs &Marie-Thérèse de Clausel

Nicolas-Alexandre, marquis de Ségur (1695–1755) was a Bordeaux wine maker who during his lifetime was known as the "Prince of Vines" due to his ownership of some of the most famous Bordeaux chateaus-including Château Lafite, Château Latour, Château Mouton and Château Calon-Ségur. A hundred years after his death, the Bordeaux Wine Official Classification of 1855 would designate Lafite and Latour as First Growths, Mouton as a second growth and Calon-Ségur as a third growth.

== Biography ==
=== Family background ===
Nicolas-Alexandre Ségur was the son of Alexandre de le Meon de Ségur de Francs et Portugaises and Marie-Thérèse de Clausel and paternal grandson of Jean-Isaac, marquis de Ségur (d. 1707), military commander and a descendant of François de Ségur, seigneur de Sainte-Aulaye (d. 1605). His first cousin was Henri François, comte de Ségur. Through his maternal grandfather, he inherited Château Latour.

=== Vineyard ownership ===
In 1716, Alexandre de Ségur bought Château Lafite and, following his death that occurred soon after, the estate passed on to Nicolas-Alexandre. In 1718, Nicolas-Alexandre acquired Château Mouton and Château Calon-Ségur.

At one point, Ségur owned the land that would become the classified estates of Chateau d'Armailhac and Chateau Pontet-Canet.

=== Prince des vignes ===
Under the Marquis' influence, the wines of Chateau Lafite became firmly entrenched in the London market. Prime Minister Robert Walpole was a frequent customer, purchasing a barrel every three months. The Marechal de Richelieu introduced the wines of Chateau Lafite to the royal court of Louis XV and spoke glowingly of the wine's invigorating benefits.

Louis gave Nicolas-Alexandre the nickname "The Prince des vignes" when he visited his court. The king mistook the buttons on the Marquis' coat for diamonds and complemented on their quality. The king was then informed that those stones were actually the cut and polished rocks from the Marquis' famous vineyards.

=== Death ===
Ségur died in 1755 and his estate was divided among four daughters.

== Legacy ==
Nicolas-Alexandre is credited with drawing the line that divides the neighboring Chateau Lafite and (now) Chateau Mouton-Rothschild and distinguishing the different styles of wine that these two properties produce. While the other properties were sold not long after his death, Chateau Latour stayed within his family till 1963.
