= Charles de Saint-Albin =

Bishop of Laon and son of Philippe II

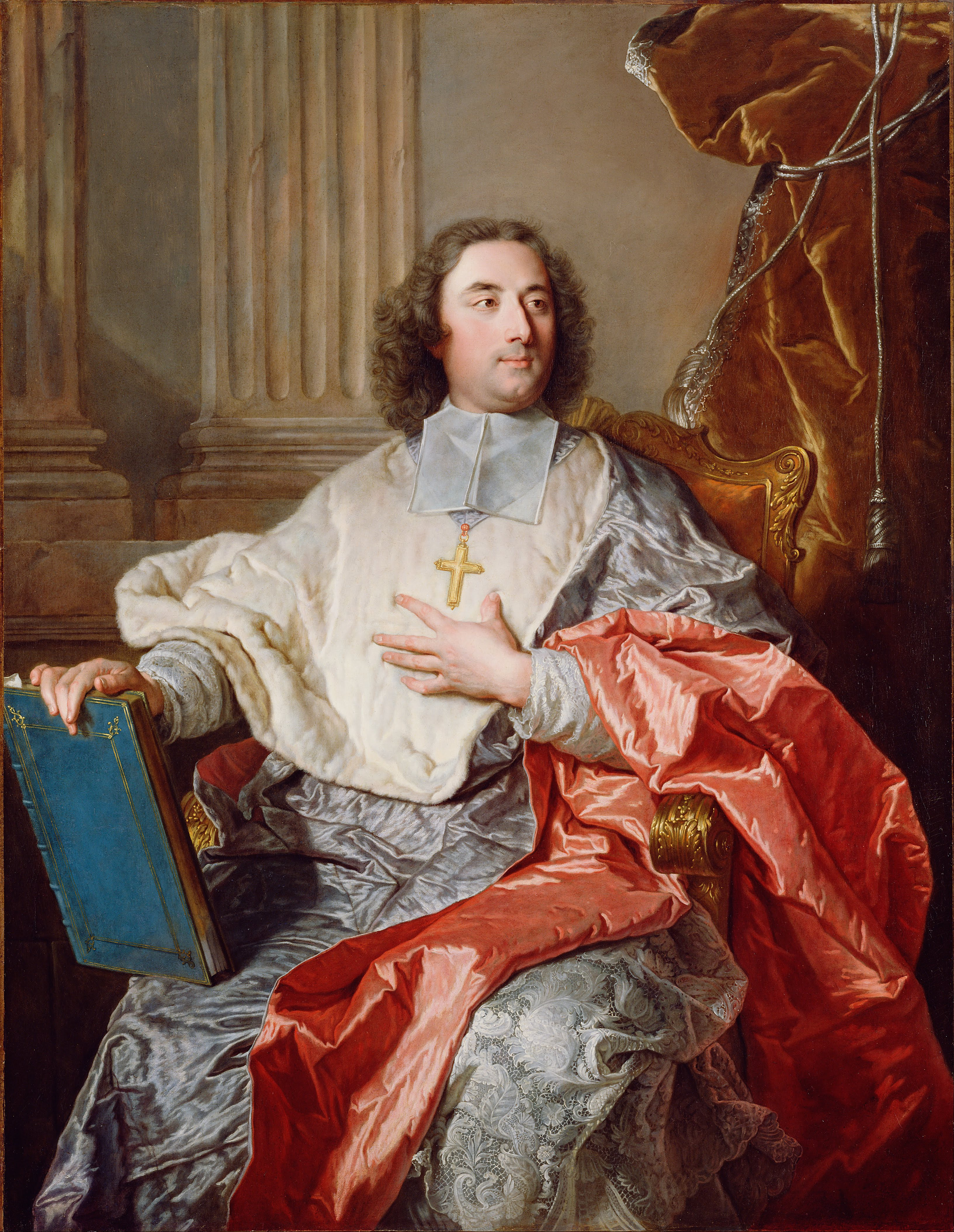
Charles de Saint-Albin, Archbishop of Cambrai by Hyacinthe Rigaud (1723)

Louis Charles de Saint-Albin (Paris, 5 April 1698 – Paris 9 April 1764), also called Abbé d'Orléans, was Bishop of Laon and Archbishop of Cambrai.

== Biography ==
Louis Charles was the illegitimate son of French Regent and nephew of Louis XIV, Philipp d'Orléans and the opera dancer Florence Pellerin (1660–1716). However, his father legitimized him in 1708. He was on good terms with his grandmother Liselotte of the Palatinate, although she otherwise did not appreciate bastards. She was even present at his Rigorosum at the Sorbonne.

Like all of his legitimate and illegitimate children, Duke Philip also looked after Louis Charles appropriately and appointed him Abbot of Saint-Ouen Abbey, Rouen and on 6 October 1721, Bishop and Duke of Laon and Peer of France. After the death of the minister Guillaume Dubois, Charles de Saint-Albin took up the now vacant dignity of Archbishop and Duke of Cambrai on 17 October 1723. The consecration was carried out by Armand Gaston Maximilien de Rohan, Cardinal-Archbishop of Strasbourg. However, Saint-Albain hardly stayed in his diocese, but mostly at the court of Louis XV.

Louis Charles de Saint-Albin is immortalized in a painting by Hyacinthe Rigaud, now in the Getty Center, Los Angeles. He is buried in the Saint Sulpice Church in Paris.
