= Henri François, comte de Ségur =

Henri François, comte de Ségur, baron de Romainville et de Ponchat, seigneur de Fougueyrolles (1 June 1689 – 18 June 1751) was a French military general.

== Family background ==
He was the son of Henri Joseph, comte de Ségur (1661–1737), military commander and duke, and Claude Élisabeth Binet and paternal grandson of Jean-Isaac, marquis de Ségur (d. 1707), military commander and a descendant of François de Ségur, seigneur de Sainte-Aulaye (d. 1605). His first cousin was Nicolas-Alexandre, marquis de Ségur.

== Career ==
Called le beau Ségur ("the handsome Ségur"), he was Master of the Regent, Philippe d'Orléans' Wardrobe (maître de la garderobe du Régent), and lived in an hôtel in Passy, Paris on a beautiful ten-acre property, which later passed to the Duchess of Valentinois and was named Hôtel de Valentinois after her. (The property is famous for being the residence of Benjamin Franklin for nearly ten years.) On 10 or 12 September 1718, Ségur married in Paris Angélique de Froissy (1702–1785), the Regent's illegitimate daughter, at Gagny. Described as "fresh, white, well-made, strong and intoxicating", Angélique belonged to the inner circle of Louis XV's intimates.

In 1723, he bought the castle of Romainville.

He was maréchal de camp in 1734, lieutenant général in 1738, and inspecteur général of the cavalry and the dragoons. He fought in the War of Austrian Succession, where he lost the Battle of Pfaffenhofen but prevented the total destruction of his army.

He was made governor of the County of Foix from 1737 until 1751, when he was succeeded by his son, and was made a Knight in the Ordre du Saint-Esprit on 2 February 1748.

== Death ==
Henri François died in Metz on 18 June 1751, aged 62. His son Philippe Henri, marquis de Ségur (1724–1801) became Marquis of Ségur and was named Marshal of France in 1783.

== Issue ==
Ségur and his wife had at least five children:

- Philippine Charlotte de Ségur (Paris, 12 July 1719 – Paris, 12 July 1719)
- Henriette Élisabeth de Ségur (Paris, 20 September 1722 – 1747?), unmarried and without issue
- Philippe Henri, marquis de Ségur (Paris, 20 January 1724 – Paris, 3 October 1801), marshal of France in 1783, twin with the below
- Philippe Angelique de Ségur (Paris, 20 January 1724 – Paris, 20 January 1724), twin with the above
- Henriette Césarine de Ségur (1726–1782), married Bertrand Gaich, baron de la Crozes, Knight of Saint-Louis.
