= Philippe Henri, marquis de Ségur =

French military officer (1724-1801)

Maréchal de France Philippe Henri de Ségur Marquis de Ségur
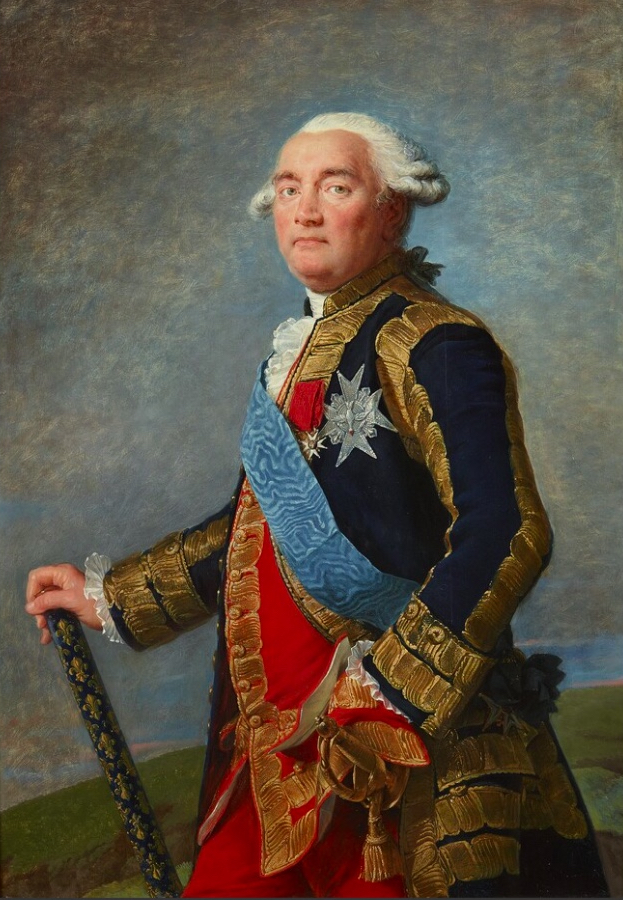
- Official portrait as Marshal of France, 1789 (copy by Joséphine Houssay after Élisabeth Vigée Le Brun).

Marquis of Ségur
- In office 19 June 1751 – 3 October 1801
- Preceded by: Henri François, Comte de Ségur
- Succeeded by: Louis-Philippe, Marquis de Ségur

Secretary of State for War
- In office 23 December 1780 – 27 August 1787
- Preceded by: Charles Gravier, Comte de Vergennes
- Succeeded by: Louis Charles Auguste Le Tonnelier, Baron de Breteuil, Baron de Preuilly

Personal details
- Born: 20 January 1724 Paris, Kingdom of France
- Died: 3 August 1801 (aged 77) Paris, French Republic
- Spouse(s): Louise-Anne-Madeleine, Marquise de Ségur, née de Vernon (1729–1778)
- Children: Louis Philippe, Comte de Ségur; Joseph-Alexandre Pierre, Vicomte de Ségur

Military service
- Years of service: 1739–1787
- Battles/wars: Seven Years' War

Philippe Henri, Marquis de Ségur (20 January 1724 – 3 October 1801) was a French military officer who was Marshal of France and Secretary of State for War under King Louis XV and later King Louis XVI. He was a grandson of Philippe II, Duke of Orléans,

== Biography ==
Born in Paris, son of Henri François, Comte de Ségur and his wife Philippe Angélique de Froissy, Philippe Henri was appointed to the command of an infantry regiment at eighteen, and served under his father in Italy and Bohemia. He was wounded at Roucoux in Flanders in October 1746, and lost an arm at Lauffeld in 1747. In 1748 he succeeded his father as lieutenant-general of Champagne and Brie; he also received in 1753 the governorship of the county of Foix.

During the Seven Years' War he fought at Hastenbeck (1757), Krefeld (1758) and Minden (1759). In 1760 he was taken prisoner at Kloster Kampen.

The ability which he showed in the government of Franche-Comté in 1775 led in 1780 to his appointment as Minister for War under Jacques Necker. He created in 1783 the permanent general staff, and made admirable regulations with regard to barracks and military hospitals; and though he was officially responsible for the reactionary decree requiring four quarterings of nobility as a condition for the appointment of officers, the scheme is said not to have originated with him and to have been adopted under protest. On 13 June 1783 he became a marshal of France. He resigned from the ministry of war in 1787.

During the Reign of Terror he was imprisoned in La Force, and after his release was reduced to considerable straits until in 1800 he received an annual pension of 6,000 francs from Napoléon Bonaparte. He died in Paris the next year.

== Family ==
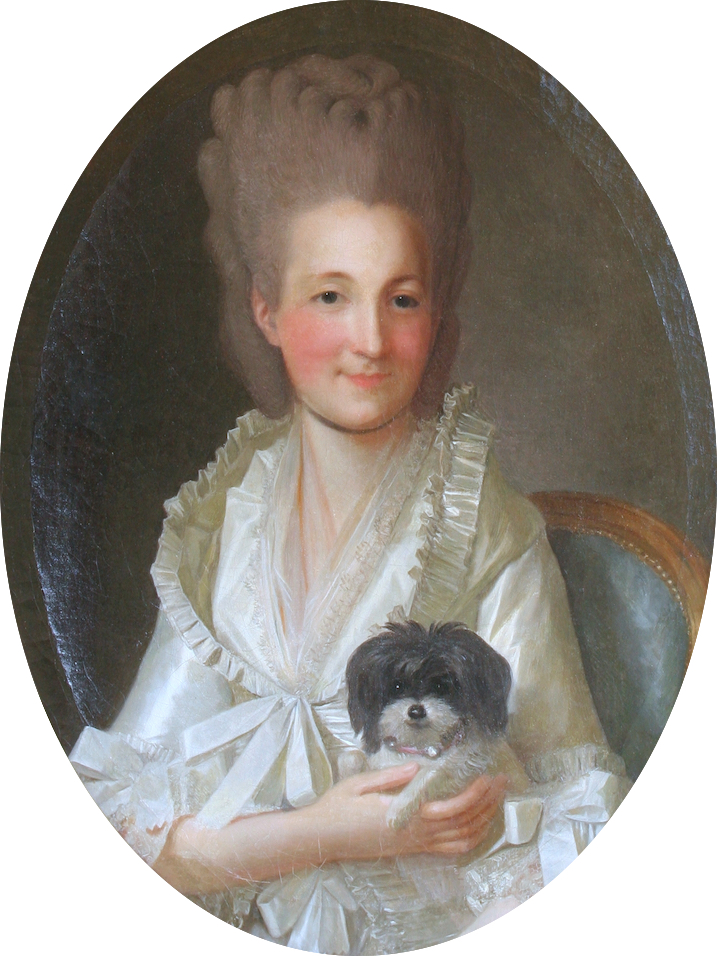
Louise-Anne-Madeleine, Marquise de Ségur, née de Vernon (1729–1778).

Philippe Henri de Ségur married on 3 February 1749 in Paris Louise-Anne-Madeleine de Vernon (1729–1778), daughter of Alexandre de Vernon (c. 1654–1729) and Anne Duvivier. They had two sons:

- Louis Philippe, Comte de Ségur
- Joseph-Alexandre Pierre, Vicomte de Ségur

Both sons, Louis Philippe and Joseph Alexandre Pierre, were born at the family's hôtel particulier in Paris, the Hôtel de Ségur at 9 Rue Saint-Florentin.

=== Pierre Victor, Baron de Besenval ===
Joseph-Alexandre Pierre de Ségur was actually the son of Philippe Henri de Ségur's best friend Pierre Victor, Baron de Besenval de Brunstatt, usually just referred to as Baron de Besenval (the suffix Brunstatt refers to the former barony).

The fact that the Baron de Besenval was the father of the second son was no secret within the family. After the death of his best friend and military comrade Pierre Victor, Baron de Besenval, in 1791, Philippe Henri de Ségur inherited the usufruct of the Hôtel de Besenval.

== Titles and decorations ==
- Knight of the Holy Spirit effective 7 June 1767.

Figure	Blazon House of Ségur
	Quarterly: 1st and 4th; Gules a lion Or, at 2 and 3, plain silver.

Political offices
Preceded by Alexandre Marie Léonor de Saint-Mauris de Montbarrey	Secretary of State for War; 1780–1787	Succeeded by Louis Charles-Auguste le Tonnelier, baron de Breteuil
