= Philippe Paul, comte de Ségur =

French general and historian

Philippe-Paul, comte de Ségur
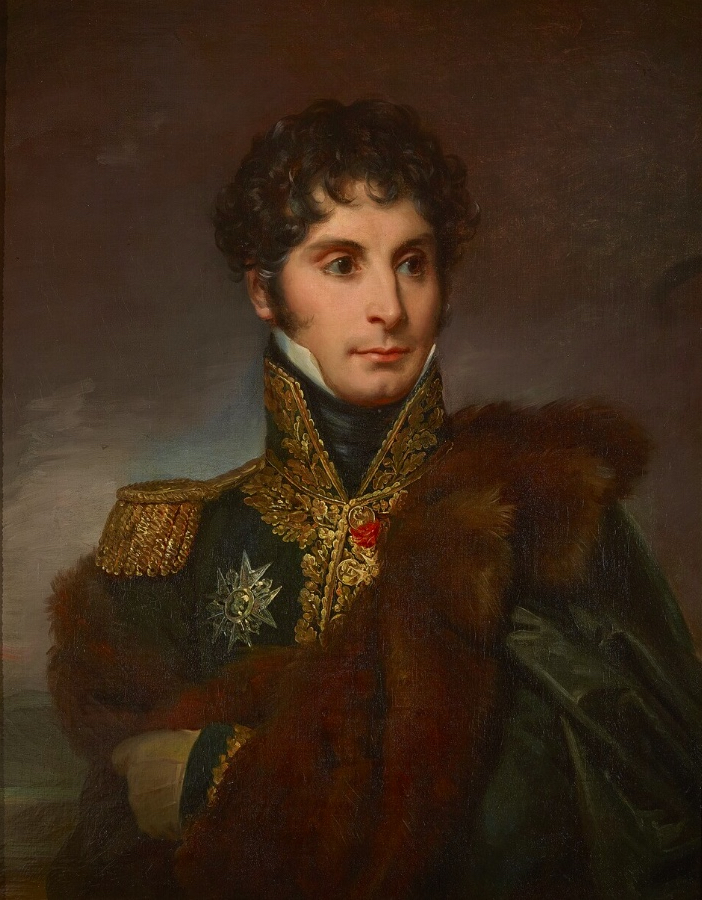
- Philippe Paul, comte de Ségur
- Born: 4 November 1780; Paris, France
- Died: 25 February 1873 (aged 92)
- Occupations: French general, historian
- Notable work: Histoire de Napoléon et de la grande armée pendant l'année 1812; Histoire de Russie et de Pierre le Grand; Histoire de Charles VIII
- Awards: Grand Cross of the Legion of Honour

Philippe-Paul, comte de Ségur (French pronunciation: [filip pɔl də seɡyʁ]; 4 November 1780 – 25 February 1873) was a French general and a historian.

== Biography ==
Ségur was the son of Louis Philippe, comte de Ségur and was born in Paris 4 November 1780. He enlisted in the cavalry in 1800, and forthwith obtained a commission. He served with General Macdonald in the Grisons in 1800–1801, and published an account of the campaign in 1802. By the influence of Colonel Duroc (afterwards duc de Frioul) he was attached to the personal staff of Napoleon. He served through most of the important campaigns of the first empire, and was frequently employed on diplomatic missions. During the campaign in Poland in 1807 he was taken prisoner by the Russians, but was exchanged at the Peace of Tilsit.

For his diplomatic duties he was promoted to colonel. Wounded in Spain, he was compelled to return to France. As general of brigade he took part in the Russian campaign of 1812, and in the campaigns of 1813 and 1814 he repeatedly distinguished himself, notably at Hanau (October 1813), and in a brilliant affair at Reims (March 1814). He remained in the army at the Restoration, but, having accepted a command from Napoleon during the Hundred Days, he was retired until 1818, and took no further active part in affairs until the July Revolution of 1830.

On the establishment of the July monarchy he received, in 1831, the grade of lieutenant-general and a peerage. In 1830 he was admitted to the Académie française, and he became grand cross of the Legion of Honour in 1847. After the Revolution of 1848 he lived in retirement, dying in Paris on 25 February 1873.

== Bibliography ==
During his first retirement between 1818 and 1830 he wrote his Histoire de Napoléon et de la grande armée pendant l'année 1812 (Paris, 2 vols., 1824), which ran through numerous editions, and was translated into several languages. The unfavourable portrait of Napoleon given in this book provoked representations from General Gourgaud, and eventually a duel, in which Ségur was wounded.

His other works include: Histoire de Russie et de Pierre le Grand (1829); Histoire de Charles VIII. (2 vols., 1834–1842), in continuation of the history of France begun by his father; and the posthumous Histoire et mémoires (8 vols., 1873).

His daughter, Marie Célestine Amélie d'Armaillé (1830–1918), was also a writer, biographer, and historian.
