= Louis Philippe, comte de Ségur =

French diplomat and historian (1753–1830)

Louis Philippe de Ségur
- Comte (1753) et Marquis (1801) de Ségur
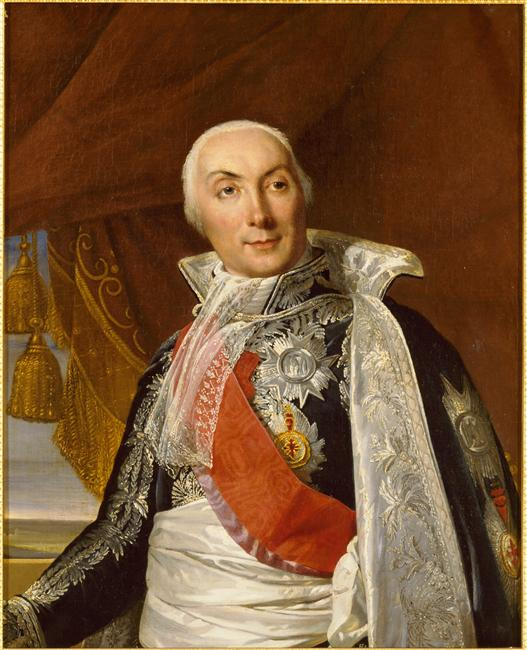
- Louis Philippe de Ségur in the costume of the Grand Master of Ceremonies of the First Empire
- Born: 10 December 1753; Hôtel de Ségur, Paris, France
- Died: 27 August 1830 (aged 76); Paris, France
- Noble family: House of Ségur
- Spouse: Antoinette Élisabeth Marie d'Aguesseau (21 July 1756 – 6 March 1828)
- Issue: Laure Antoinette de Ségur (11 April 1778 – 15 July 1812); Octave-Henri Gabriel, Comte de Ségur (5 June 1779 – 15 August 1818); Philippe Paul, comte de Ségur (4 November 1780 – 25 February 1873); Olivier Alexandre de Ségur (3 October 1790 – 4 May 1791)
- Father: Philippe Henri, marquis de Ségur
- Mother: Louise-Anne-Madeleine, Marquise de Ségur, née de Vernon (1729–1778)

Louis Philippe, Marquis et Comte de Ségur (1753–1830), was a French military officer, diplomat and historian.

== Biography ==
Louis Philippe de Ségur was born in Paris, the son of Philippe Henri, marquis de Ségur and Louise-Anne-Madeleine, Marquise de Ségur, née de Vernon (1729–1778). Like his younger half-brother, Joseph-Alexandre Pierre, Vicomte de Ségur, Louis Philippe de Ségur was also born at the family's hôtel particulier in Paris, the Hôtel de Ségur at 9 Rue Saint-Florentin.

Louis Philippe de Ségur entered the army in 1769 and served in the American War of Independence in 1781 as a colonel under Jean-Baptiste Donatien de Vimeur, comte de Rochambeau.

In 1784, he was sent as minister plenipotentiary to Saint Petersburg, where he arrived on 10 March 1785. He belonged to the inner circle of Empress Catherine II and wrote some comedies for her theatre. On 11 January 1787, he concluded a commercial treaty in Saint Petersburg which was exceedingly advantageous to France. On 17 January 1787, he arrived in Tsarskoye Selo to prepare for his journey to Crimea, to which he was invited by Empress Catherine II. The next day, the imperial tour group departed towards the Crimea. In 1789, Louis Philippe de Ségur returned to Paris.

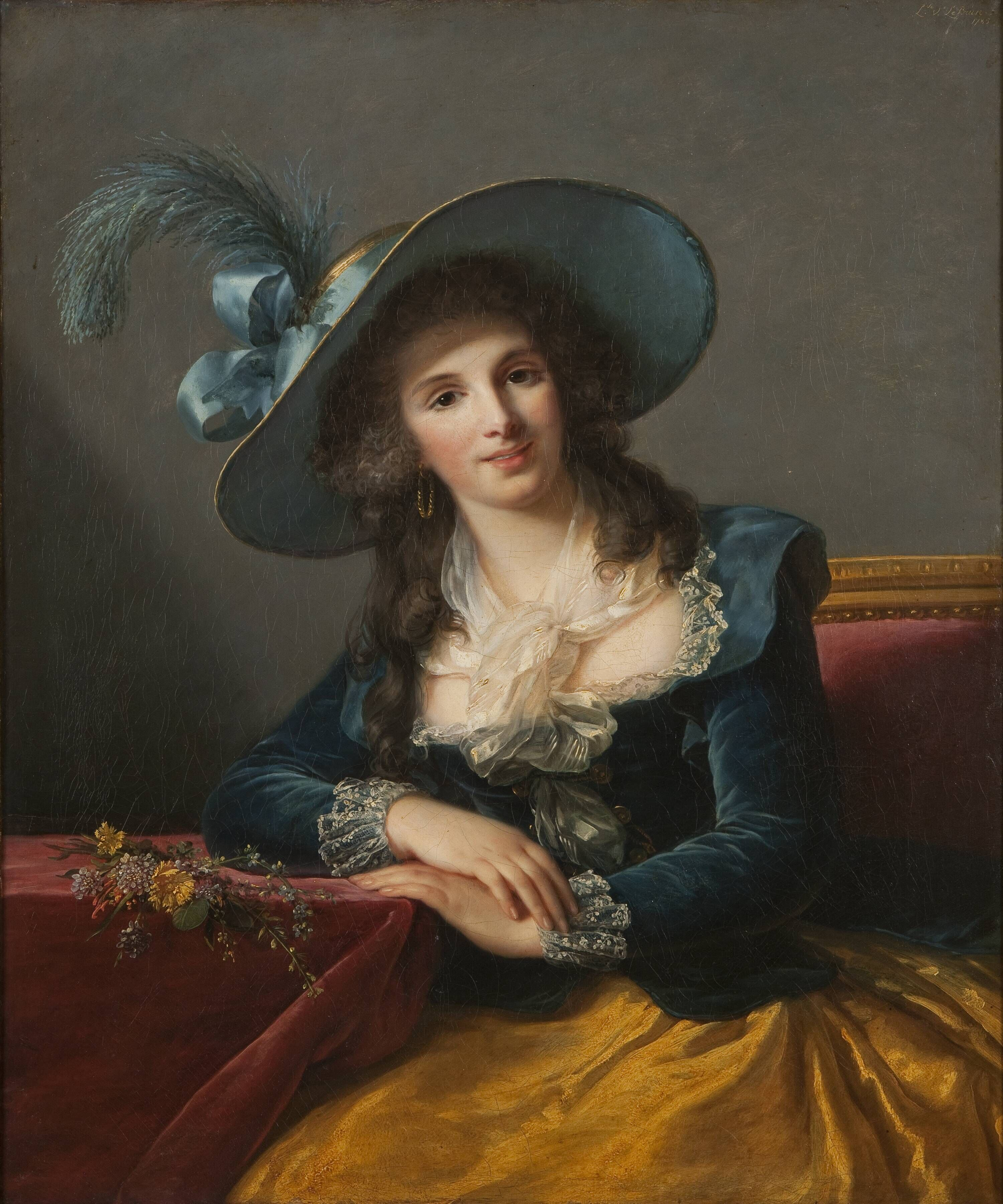
Antoinette Elisabeth Marie de Ségur, née d'Aguesseau, portrayed in 1785 by Élisabeth Vigée Le Brun.

Louis Philippe de Ségur took up a sympathetic attitude towards the French Revolution at its outset and in 1791 was sent on a mission to Berlin, where he was badly received. After fighting a duel he was forced to leave Berlin, and went into retirement until 1801 when, at Napoléon Bonaparte's command, he was nominated by the senate to the Corps Législatif. Subsequently, he became a member of the council of state, Grand Master of Ceremonies (1804–1814 and 1815 (Hundred Days)) and a senator in 1813. In 1814 Ségur voted for the deposition of Napoléon and entered King Louis XVIII's Chamber of Peers. Deprived of his offices and functions in 1815 for joining Napoléon during the Hundred Days, he was reinstated in 1819 and supported the Revolution of 1830, but died shortly afterwards.

Louis Philippe de Ségur married on 30 April 1777 Antoinette Élisabeth Marie d'Aguesseau (1756–1828), who also died in Paris. They had three sons and one daughter:

- Laure Antoinette de Ségur (1778–1812), married Louis Auguste Vallet de La Touche, Baron de Villeneuve, Marquis du Blanc (Paris, 4 February 1779 – Le Blanc, Indre, 24 December 1837), and had issue
- Octave-Henri Gabriel, Comte de Ségur
- Philippe Paul, comte de Ségur
- Olivier Alexandre de Ségur (1790–1791)

"The young desire to know what the old have seen and done."

— The first sentence in the first volume of the memoirs of Louis Philippe, Comte de Ségur

== Publications (partial list) ==
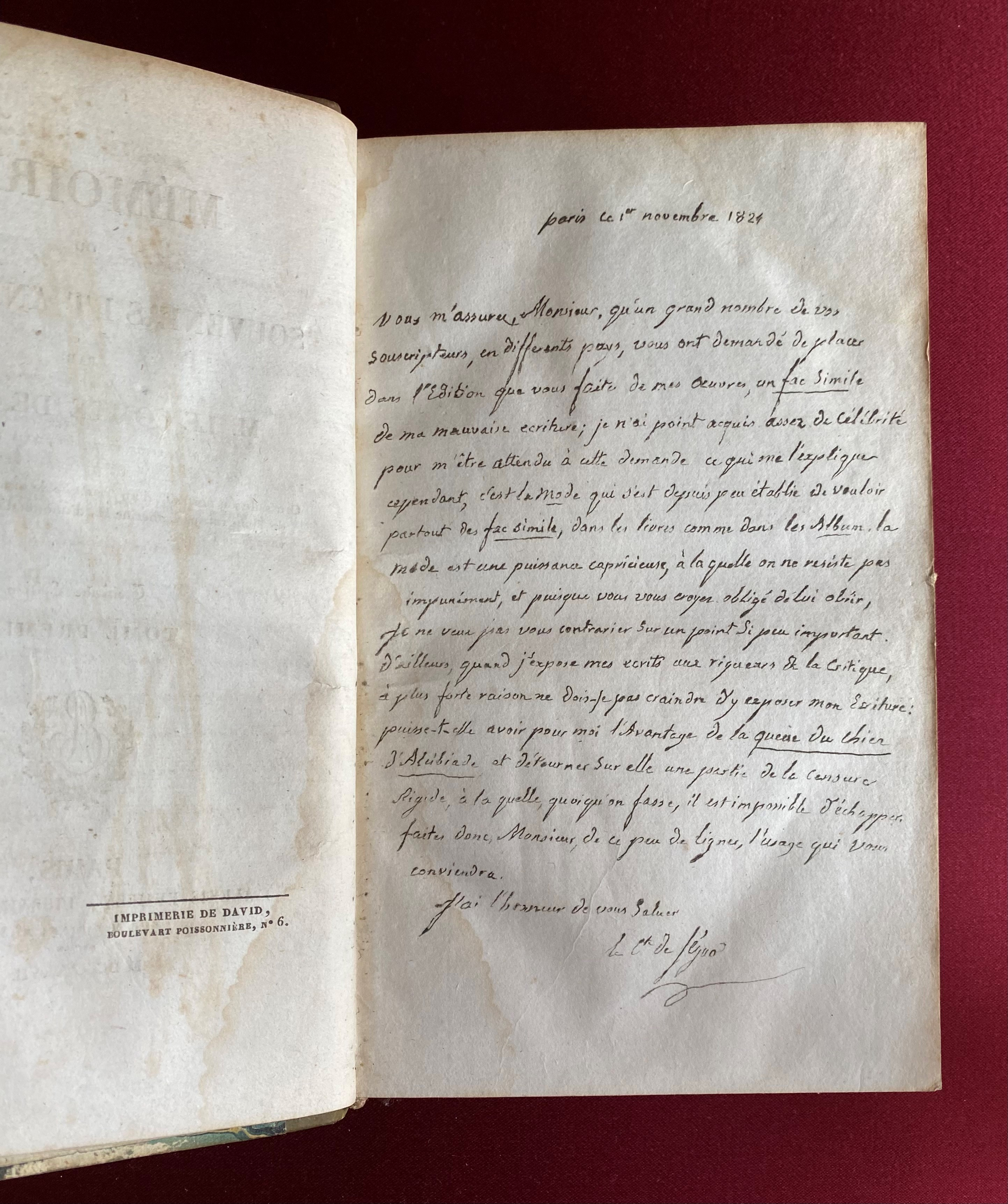
A personal dedication from Louis Philippe, Comte de Ségur, to his readers.

- Tableau historique et politique de l'Europe de 1786–1796. Contenant l'histoire de Frédéric-Guillaume II
- Pensées politiques (Paris, 1795)
- Théâtre de l'hermitage (Paris, 1798, 2 volumes)
- Histoire des principaux évènements du règne de Fréderic-Guillaume II (1800)
- Contes (1809)
- Histoire de France (n vols., 1824–1834)
- His Œuvres complètes were published in 34 volumes in 1824 et seq.
- Histoire des juifs (1827)
- Mémoires ou Souvenirs et Anecdotes (Paris, 1827, 3 volumes)
- The Memoirs and Anecdotes of the Count de Segur, edited by Gerard Shelley (1928)
- Memoirs of Louis Phillippe, Comte de Segur, edited by Eveline Cruickshanks (1960)
