= Charles de La Buissière =

French actor

Charles de La Bussière (1768–1808) was a French actor.

Labussière was born in Paris to a noble and poor officer with whom he would never get along. At sixteen, the latter sent him as a cadet in the Savoie-Carignan regiment, which was garrisoned in Dunkirk. But he quickly turns away from the career of arms. Back in Paris, he becomes an actor and interprets with some success the roles of simpletons in a theater in the suburbs. It was at this time that he simplified his name to Labussière, which was easier to pronounce and remember.

In 1789, before the assembly gathered in the church of Saint-Jacques-de-l'Hôpital, presided over by the old Charier, former prosecutor at Châtelet1, M. de Labussière supported an extravagant motion, according to which a deputation had to be sent to Versailles to the king asking him to “bring 12,000 troops into Paris in order to restore order there”. This proposal had the expected result: Charles-Hippolyte Labussière was immediately hanged from the lantern by the furious assistants. Delivered by French guards, he was handed over by them “more dead than alive into the hands of Etienne François Gallet de Santerre, a banker in Paris, who was an acquaintance of his. Taken to the prison of the Abbey, he came out a few weeks later. M. Gallet de Santerre thought it prudent to send M. de La Bussiere to the country for a few months, in order to give the people time to forget this affair, with which all Paris resounded.
