= Walter Stucki =

Swiss lawyer, politician and diplomat

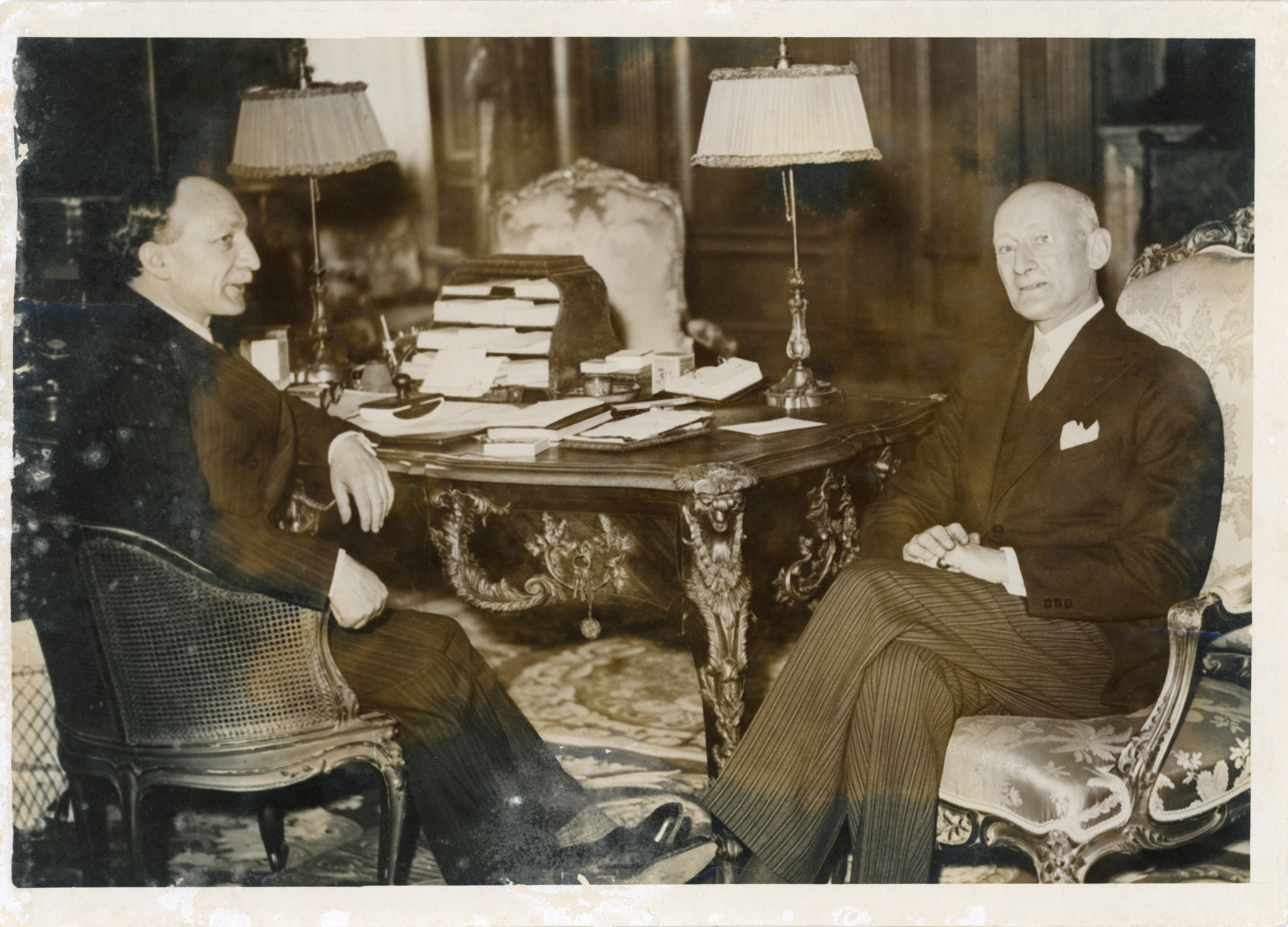
- On the afternoon of 8 March 1938, Walter Stucki, the designated Envoy of the Swiss Confederation to France (right), and the French Foreign Minister Yvon Delbos (at his desk) met for talks in Delbos' office at the Ministry of Foreign Affairs. On this occasion, Stucki presented Delbos with a copy of his lettres de créance, which Stucki later presented to the President of the French Republic, Albert Lebrun.
- Born: 9 August 1888; Bern, Switzerland
- Died: 8 October 1963 (aged 75); Bern, Switzerland
- Occupation: Diplomat
- Spouse: Gertrud Sahli
- Parent(s): Gottlieb Stucki (1854–1908) and Marie Luise, née Rothacher

Walter Stucki (1888–1963) was a Swiss lawyer, politician, diplomat and Envoy of the Swiss Confederation to France. His family originated from Konolfingen.

Walter Stucki's political influence was such that he was sometimes dubbed the eighth Federal Councillor. When asked about it, he dismissed the notion with a wry remark: If he ever joined the Federal Council, he certainly wouldn't be its eighth member.

== Education and career ==
After attending school in Bern and studying law in the same town, he completed his studies with the state examination in 1912. He then worked for the law firm Leo Merz & Hugo Mosimann (first only Leo Merz, later only known as Hugo Mosimann) in Bern. At the same time, he continued his education in international law as well as international contract and commercial law in Munich, Paris and London.

=== First steps in the federal administration ===
In 1917, he was appointed Secretary General by Federal Councillor Edmund Schulthess for the Federal Department of Economic Affairs (FDEA). But by the end of 1919, he had returned to the law firm Leo Merz & Hugo Mosimann, however, with numerous federal mandates.

In 1925, Federal Councillor Edmund Schulthess asked him back to the Federal Department of Economic Affairs (FDEA) and appointed him as director of the Trade Department. As chief negotiator, Walter Stucki concluded 48 trade agreements for Switzerland and represented the country at international conferences, including the League of Nations. In 1933, he received the title of minister and an honorary doctorate from the University of Basel.

=== Rejected candidacies for the Federal Council and resignation as civil servant ===
Due to his great popularity, Walter Stucki was considered a candidate to succeed the Federal Councillors Heinrich Häberlin and Edmund Schulthess in the Federal Council in 1934 and 1935, respectively. However, he declined the candidacy twice. When Edmund Schulthess resigned, Walter Stucki resigned as a civil servant.

=== Walter Stucki – the politician ===
In 1935, Walter Stucki was elected to the National Council with the best result on the list of the Free Democratic Party (FDP) of the Canton of Bern. At the same time, the Federal Council appointed him delegate for trade agreements (foreign trade). Because the bourgeois parties did not support his vision of a consensus democracy, he resigned from his position as a National Councillor in 1937.

=== Envoy to France ===
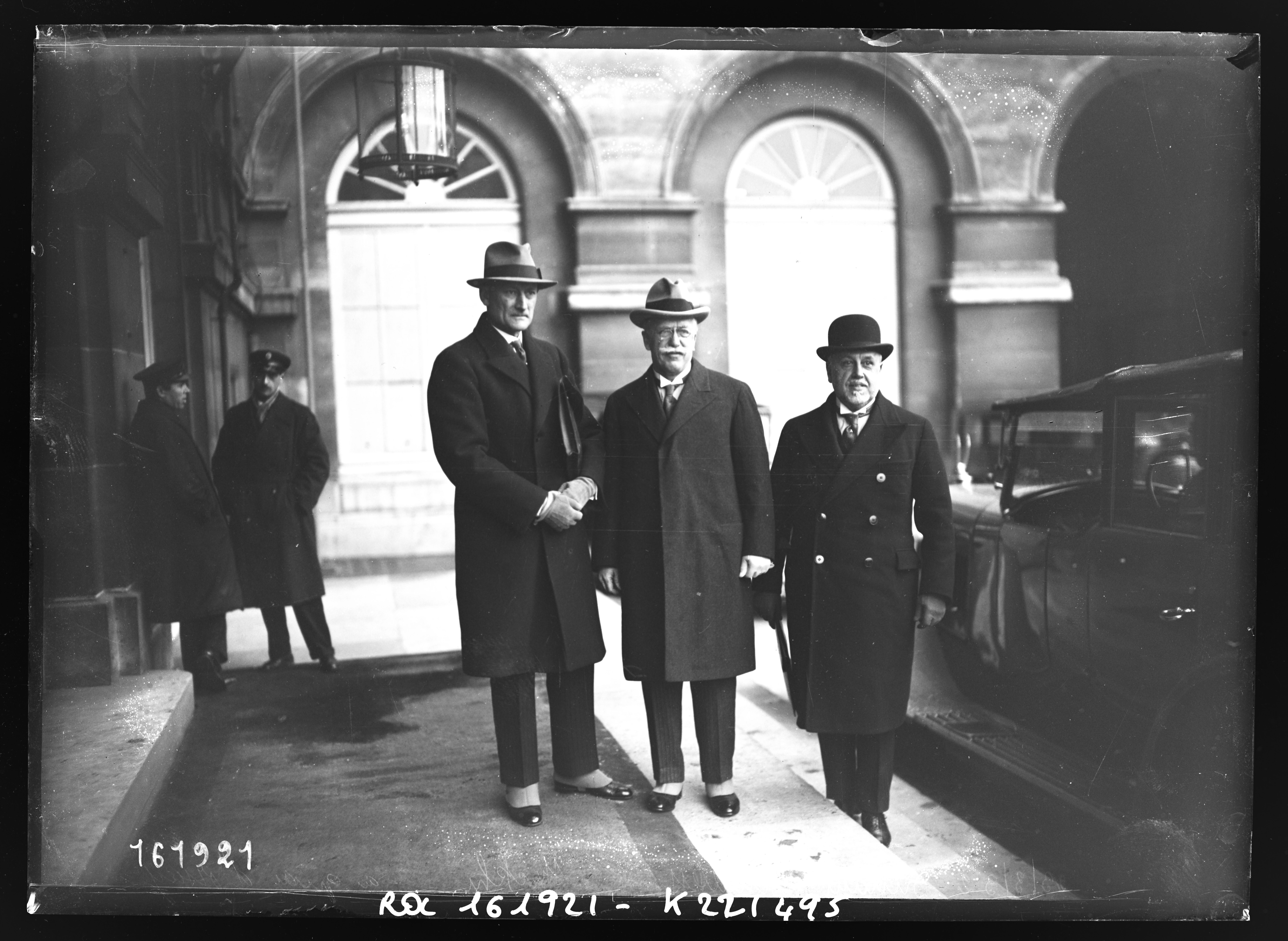
23 March 1932 – Quai d'Orsay: The two diplomats responsible for the purchase of the Hôtel de Besenval: The Swiss envoy, Minister Alphonse Dunant (right), and his successor Walter Stucki. In the middle: Federal Councillor Edmund Schulthess. In the background Minister Dunant's luxury car: An Avions Voisin.

In 1938, Walter Stucki was appointed Envoy of the Swiss Confederation to France. It was him who was in charge for completing the purchase and the supervision of the serious renovation work for the new legation building, the Hôtel de Besenval.

Walter Stucki and his wife Gertrud soon became established figures in Parisian society. Due to his eloquence, education and impeccable manners, but also because of his persistence, Walter Stucki was called "le ministre le plus parisien" (the most Parisian of ministers) by Prime Minister Édouard Daladier. In doing so, Walter Stucki continued the legendary reputation of the former owner of the Hôtel de Besenval, Pierre Victor, Baron de Besenval de Brunstatt, a Swiss military officer in French service and confidant of Queen Marie-Antoinette, who was called "le Suisse le plus français qui ait jamais été" (the most French Swiss that ever was) by Charles Augustin Sainte-Beuve.

==== Walter Stucki's first and most important mission ====
Walter Stucki was able to accomplish his first and most important mission in Paris just in time: On 30 August 1939, on the eve of World War II, Ambassador Alexis Leger, Secretary General of the French Ministry for Foreign Affairs, assured him of the unconditional respect for Switzerland's integral neutrality. General Maurice Gamelin gave the same assurance to Walter Stucki on behalf of the French Armed Forces. Two days later, on 1 September, World War II broke out.

==== War years: Mediator between the powers, saviour of the city of Vichy and recall to Bern ====
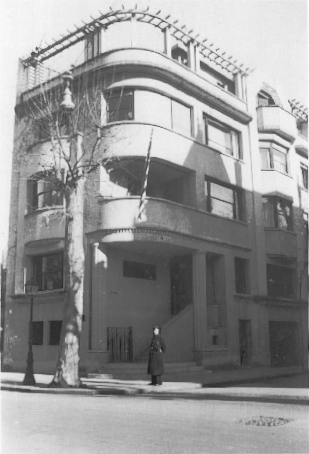
The Villa Ica on 114 Boulevard des États-Unis in Vichy (on the corner of the Boulevard des États-Unis and the Rue Prunelle) in the early 1940s. The villa was the seat of the Swiss Legation from November 1942 to September 1944.

The offices of the Swiss Legation in the Hôtel de Besenval opened in January 1939. A month earlier, in December 1938, Minister Walter Stucki was able to move into the envoy's residence. However, he could not enjoy it for long. A few months later, World War II broke out and he was soon forced to move.

From July 1940, after the Battle of France, the Capture of Paris and the Fall of the Third Republic on 22 June 1940, the legation in Paris served solely to represent the interests of Switzerland in Occupied France. De facto, the legation was downgraded to a consulate. However, the official downgrade did not occur until the summer of 1941 under pressure from Germany, when the Germans demanded that Switzerland no longer represents its interests in the territory of Occupied France from Paris, but from Berlin. But already in June 1940, Minister Walter Stucki, together with Legation Secretary Pierre Dupont (1912–1993) and Military and Air Attaché Colonel Richard de Blonay (1898–1968), as well as a large part of the French ruling elite, including Maréchal Philippe Pétain, who became prime minister on 16 June, had left Paris for Vichy. Meanwhile, Walter Stucki's deputy, Legation Councillor Henry de Torrenté, remained in Paris.

In Vichy, the Swiss Legation was first set up at the Hôtel des Ambassadeurs in two small rooms. One of them was the bedroom of Minister Walter Stucki, which also served as his office and salon. Over time, he finally managed to get a total of six rooms. Walter Stucki complained that the cramped conditions in the Hôtel des Ambassadeurs gradually became a nuisance for the many international diplomats housed there. He derided the hotel as a "camp de concentration diplomatique" (diplomatic concentration camp). Moreover, alongside the diplomats, there were just as many spies roaming the building, making work even more difficult and dangerous.

In November 1942, the Swiss took over the Villa Ica from the US ambassador Admiral William D. Leahy, who had left Vichy in the same month. Walter Stucki resided in the villa until September 1944. In Vichy, Walter Stucki represented the interests of several countries to the Third Reich, including the United Kingdom and the United States of America.

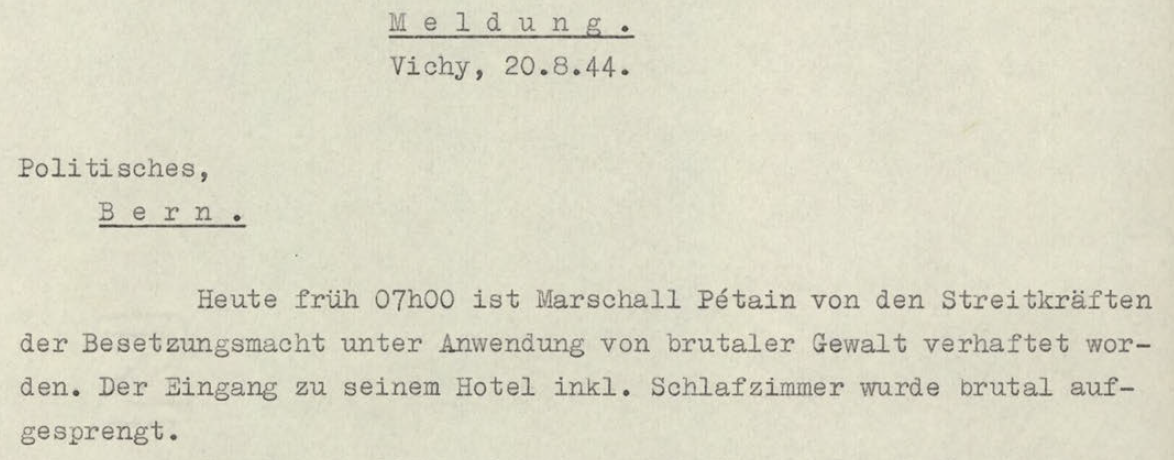
Contemporary transcription (excerpt) of the telegram sent by Walter Stucki to Federal Councillor Marcel Pilet-Golaz about the arrest of Philippe Pétain. It reads: "This morning at 07.00 hours, Maréchal Pétain was arrested by the armed forces of the occupying power, brutal force having been employed. The entrance to his hotel, including his bedroom, was likewise blown open." On 20 August 1944, Pétain took Stucki to his private apartment at the Hôtel du Parc as a witness to prove that he was evacuated by the Germans against his will to Belfort. The staged arrest of Philippe Pétain, which had been precisely planned the day before through the mediation of Walter Stucki between the commanding Germans in Vichy and Général Victor Debeney, head of the secretariat of Philippe Pétain, took place in the presence of General Alexander, Freiherr Neubronn von Eisenburg (1877–1949).

Walter Stucki played a key role towards the end of World War II. On the one hand, he helped Maréchal Philippe Pétain, whose trust he enjoyed, to withdraw from Vichy on 20 August 1944, saving face and without bloodshed. On the other hand, he mediated between the advancing Allies, the withdrawing Germans and the French Resistance fighters and saved Vichy from destruction.

The gratitude of the city of Vichy to Walter Stucki was overwhelming. On 29 August 1944, the grateful city government awarded him honorary citizenship during a ceremony in the town hall. In 1945, the city of Vichy presented him with a 26-piece solid silver dinner service engraved with the coat of arms of the city. And in 1957 a street was named after him, the Avenue Walter Stucki.

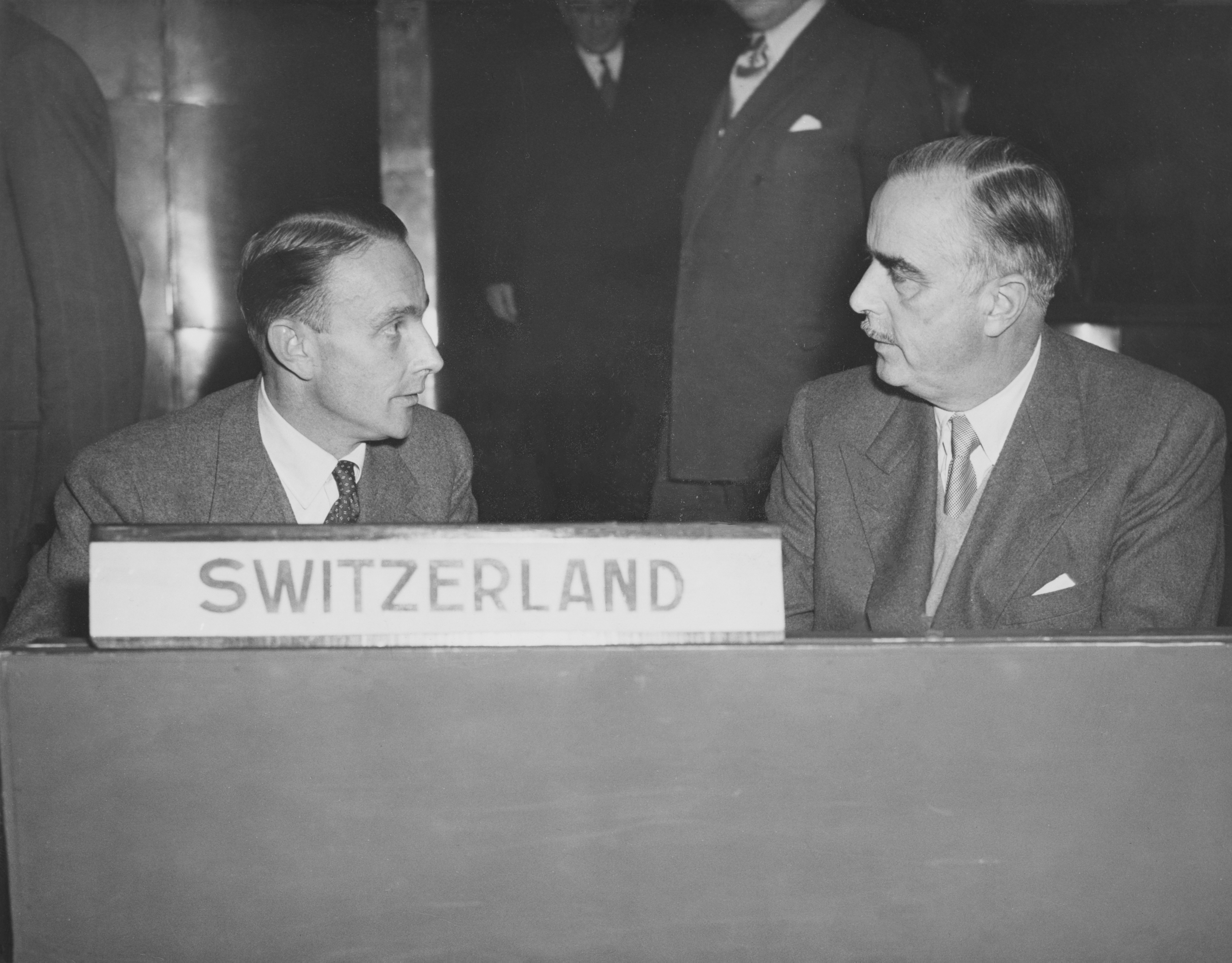
22 October 1948 – The United Nations elect the judges of the International Court of Justice: Minister Carl J. Burckhardt, Envoy of the Swiss Confederation to France (right), in conversation with his colleague Luc Bischoff (1909–1997), a legation secretary in the Swiss diplomatic service. After the war, Carl J. Burckhardt – like Walter Stucki and Hans Frölicher – was repeatedly confronted with his conduct during World War II. For the position of the Swiss envoy to France, Burckhardt and Stucki were rivals.

Walter Stucki would have liked to return to the Hôtel de Besenval in Paris. But the French government objected. Charles de Gaulle was unwilling to grant the agrément. Walter Stucki's contact with Maréchal Philippe Pétain had long since gone beyond professional matters. The French government did not approve of a confidant of Philippe Pétain serving as Envoy of the Swiss Confederation to France. Walter Stucki's downfall was that he massively underestimated Charles de Gaulle. Walter Stucki was recalled to Bern and – as his colleague Hans Frölicher, the Envoy of the Swiss Confederation in Berlin, contemptuously noted in his diary – was placed under quarantine.

Like Walter Stucki, Carl J. Burckhardt was also caught up in his wartime past. When the Federal Council approached the British government in 1944 to ask whether the former League of Nations High Commissioner for the Free City of Danzig would be acceptable as the Envoy of the Swiss Confederation to London, he was turned down. Carl J. Burckhardt, the British argued, had cultivated too familiar a relationship with Nazi figures in Danzig and as a representative of the Red Cross. Thus, Carl J. Burckhardt succeeded Walter Stucki in Paris.

Apparently, when Carl J. Burckhardt resigned in 1949, Walter Stucki would have liked to return to Paris as the Envoy of the Swiss Confederation. However, the Quai d'Orsay is said to have once again turned him down.

=== L'affaire Pétain – A historic transit journey through Switzerland in 1945, orchestrated by Walter Stucki ===
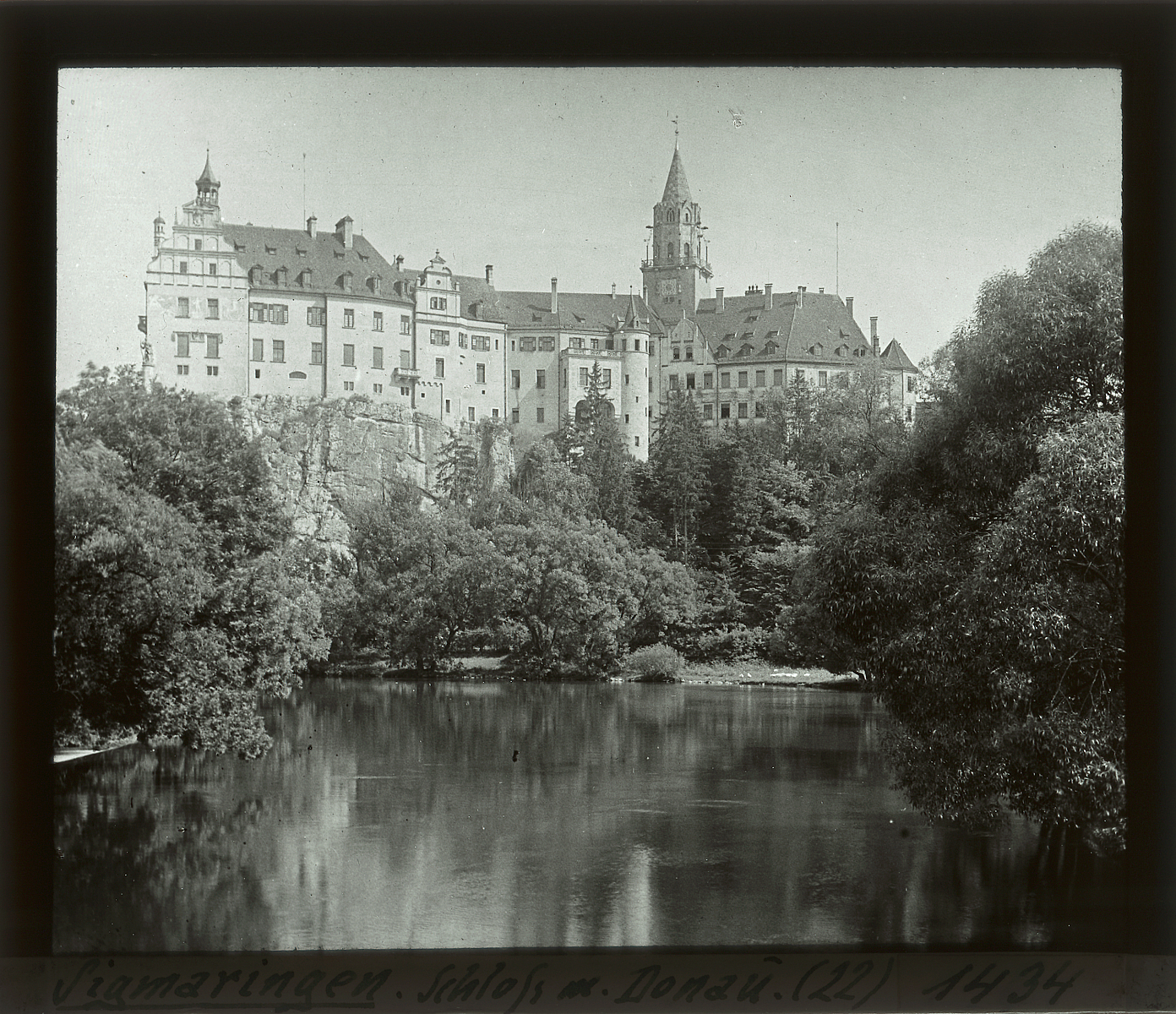
Philippe Pétain's journey from Sigmaringen to the Swiss border in 1945: 21 April: On Adolf Hitler's orders, the SS and the Gestapo begin evacuating Philippe Pétain and his entourage from Schloss Sigmaringen towards Wangen im Allgäu. 22 April: The Allies advance. Pétain is to be taken back towards Bregenz, but he refuses. An onward journey towards the Swiss border is considered. The Germans contact the Swiss Legation at Schloss Höhenried. 23 April: Walter Stucki takes charge. An entry permit for Switzerland is granted. Pétain and his entourage spend the night 10 kilometers from the Swiss border, as the border is closed overnight. 24 April, 08:40 a.m.: Pétain's convoy arrives at the Swiss border crossing at St. Margrethen. Minutes earlier, just meters from the border, an improvised official farewell ceremony for Pétain is conducted by Minister Cécil von Renthe-Fink on Austrian-German soil. 24 April, 10:00 a.m.: Customs formalities are completed. Pétain crosses the border.

On 7 September 1944, Walter Stucki returned from France to Bern and became the head of the Office of Foreign Affairs in the Federal Political Department (FPD). But already in 1945, in the last weeks of World War II, his time as Envoy of the Swiss Confederation in Paris and Vichy caught up with him, as the Federal Council once again needed his services in this context. Walter Stucki and Maréchal Philippe Pétain were to meet one last time – this time in Switzerland.

At 10:00 a.m. on 24 April 1945, on his 89th birthday, the Maréchal's convoy of four vehicles crossed the Swiss border at St. Margrethen, coming from Sigmaringen, where he was evacuated by the Germans against his will to the Schloss Sigmaringen in September 1944, following the liberation of France. Due to the Allied advance, a further evacuation of Philippe Pétain had become necessary, as the Germans did not want the Maréchal to fall into their hands. Due to the rapidly changing war and security situation, forward-looking planning was no longer possible. Decisions had to be made minute by minute.

The entry of Philippe Pétain and his entourage into Switzerland was agreed with the Federal Council, albeit at very short notice. The telephone request was made late in the evening of 22 April. At this point, Philippe Pétain and his entourage made a stopover at Schloss Zeil in Leutkirch im Allgäu, where they spent the night. With the Allies ever closer, the Germans didn't know where to take the Maréchal to safety. Nearby neutral Switzerland seemed like a good solution to the Germans – a solution also favoured by Philippe Pétain.

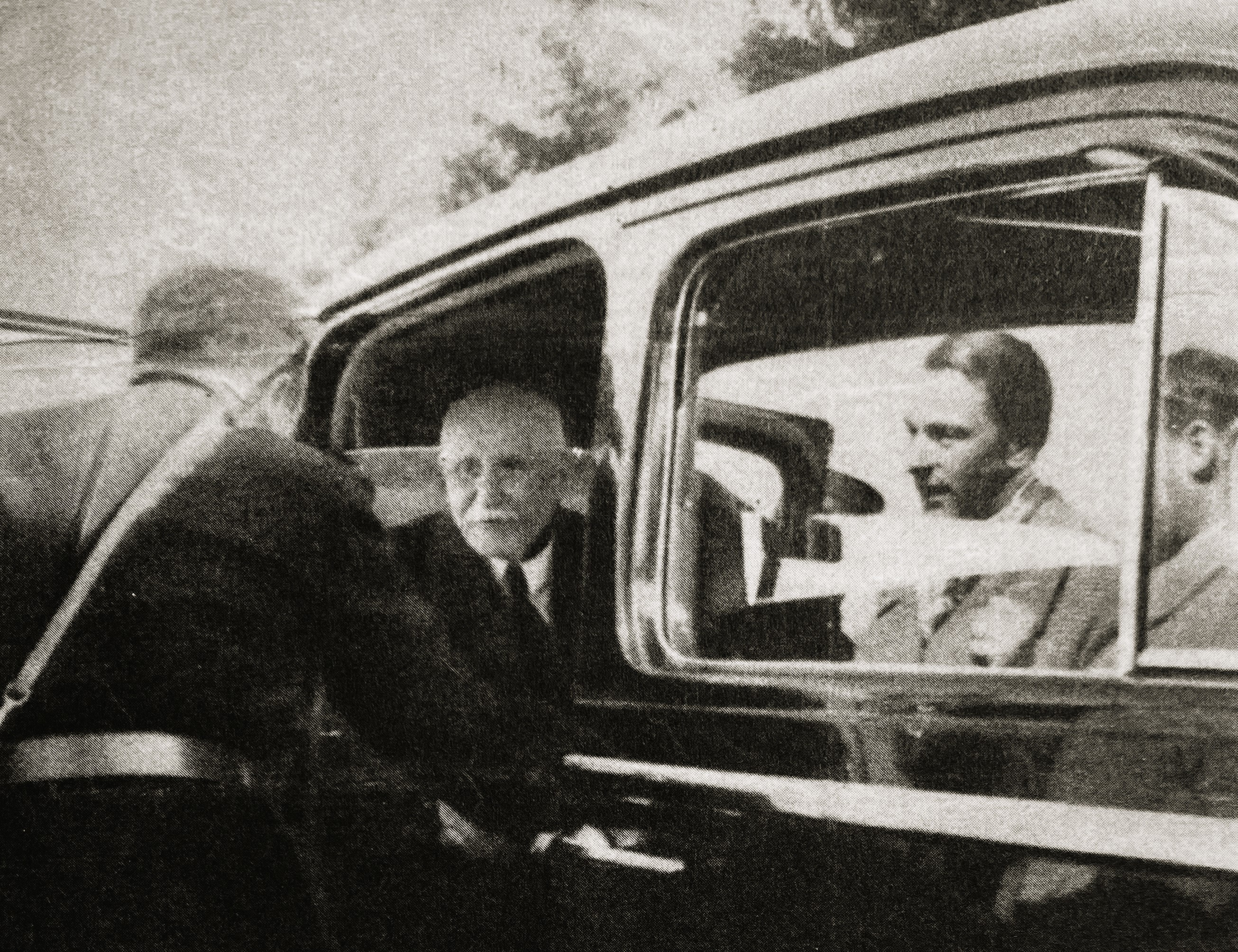
24 April 1945 at 08:40 a.m.: Philippe Pétain arrives at the Swiss border crossing at St. Margrethen. In the reflection of the car window, Hans K. Frey (1916–1974) can be seen, assigned by Walter Stucki to Pétain's convoy as liaison officer.

The following day, Maréchal Philippe Pétain and the members of his convoy received permission to enter and transit Switzerland. On the orders of Walter Stucki, the Maréchal's convoy was accompanied by his young colleague from the Swiss Legation, Hans K. Frey (1916–1974), who was to ensure a smooth border crossing of the convoy into Switzerland. The contact between the Germans and the Swiss was established through the mediation of the Swiss Legation, which was temporarily located at the Schloss Höhenried in Bernried am Starnberger See in Bavaria at the time (in 1945, Berlin became too dangerous due to the war fighting). The Federal Council authorised Maréchal Philippe Pétain and his entourage to transit through Switzerland to France. Philippe Pétain's entourage consisted of his wife Eugénie, Général Victor Debeney, Contre-Amiral Henri Bléhaut and eight officers as well as other members of his personal guard and household staff.

==== Reunion at the Walensee, the offer of political asylum and an official motorcade to the border ====
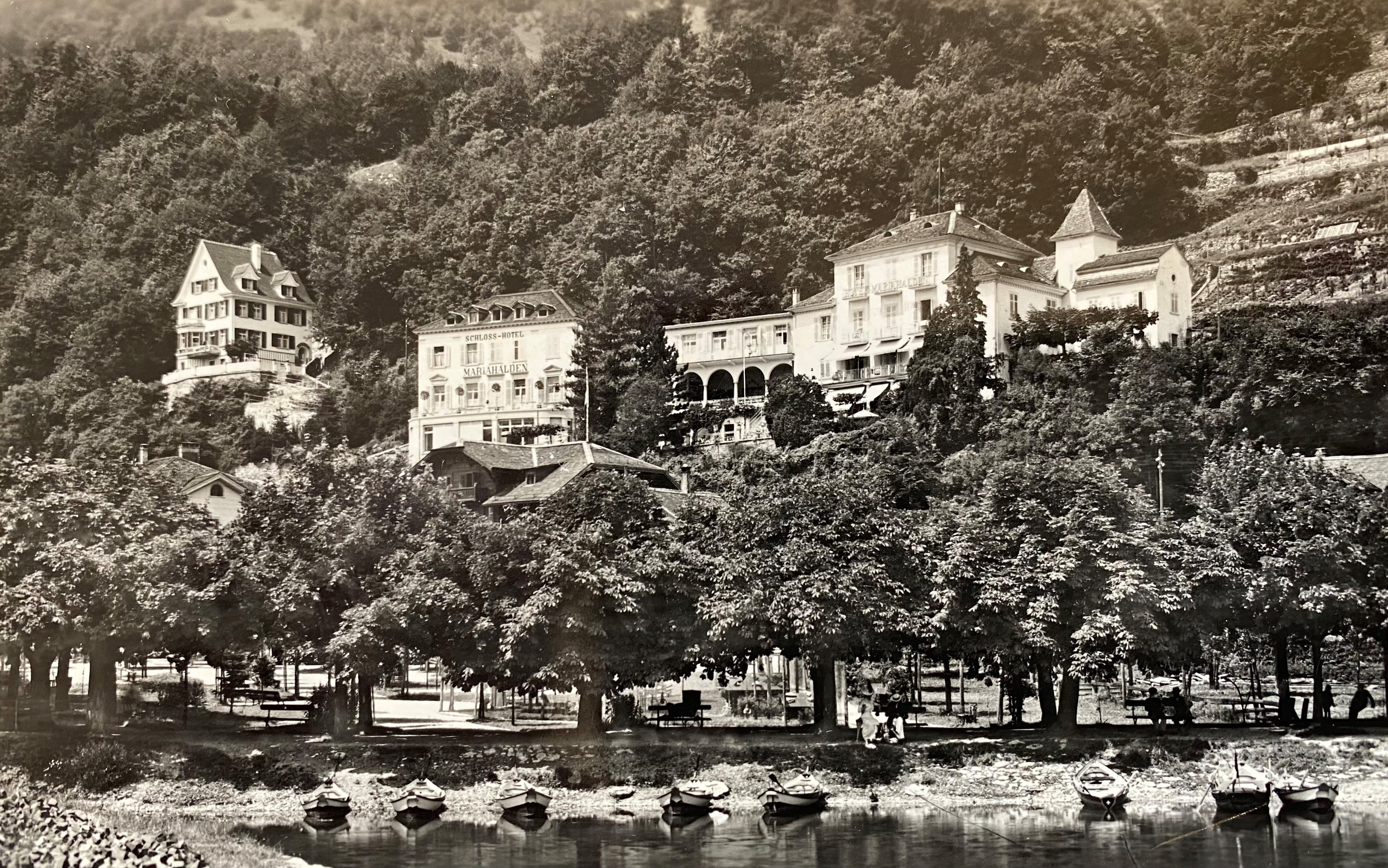
The Schloss-Hotel Mariahalden in Weesen in the 1940s. The hotel was run by the couple Maria and Walter Wehrli, who had purchased it from the German family Reiff. Philippe Pétain and his entourage stayed at the hotel from 24 to 26 April 1945. On 25 April, the meeting between Walter Stucki and Philipp Pétain took place at the hotel.

After the Maréchal's convoy had crossed the border to Switzerland, it continued its journey to Weesen at the western end of the Walensee, where the group spent the night at the Schloss-Hotel Mariahalden, which also served as an internment camp for German and Austrian officers. Walter Stucki had given orders to reserve the hotel rooms. At the same time, a meeting took place at the Hôtel de Besenval in Paris, the seat of the Envoy of the Swiss Confederation to France. Shortly thereafter, Minister Carl J. Burckhardt, who had been appointed Envoy of the Swiss Confederation to France by the Federal Council on 23 February 1945, requested an audience with Général Charles de Gaulle and officially informed him of Maréchal Philippe Pétain's presence in Switzerland and his desire to enter France. Général Charles de Gaulle would have preferred the Maréchal to seek asylum in Switzerland, which would have solved the problem for France – and for Général de Gaulle personally. Switzerland would have granted Philippe Pétain asylum, as Walter Stucki campaigned vigorously on his behalf.

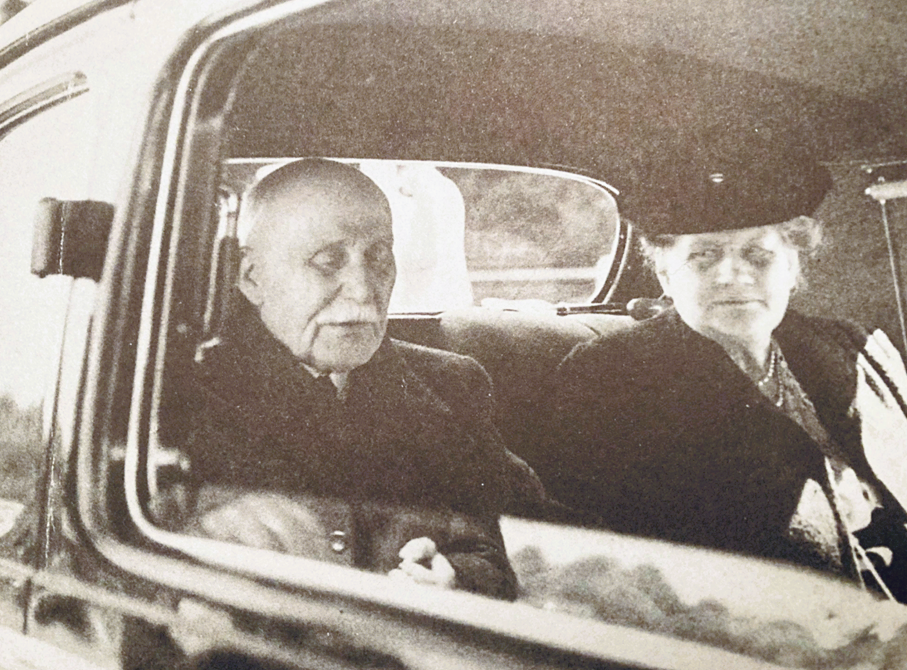
Maréchal Philipp Pétain and his wife Eugénie in Vallorbe on 26 April 1945, shortly before crossing the border into France.

On 25 April, Walter Stucki and Maréchal Philippe Pétain met in Weesen. On behalf of Federal Councillor Max Petitpierre, Walter Stucki offered the Maréchal political asylum, but Philippe Pétain firmly rejected it. He stated: "I cannot possibly hide in Switzerland and allow others who have carried out my orders to be persecuted and condemned." Walter Stucki took note of this and ensured that Philippe Pétain and his entourage could travel with dignity to Vallorbe on 26 April, with a Swiss motorcade, as directly and discreetly as possible, avoiding journalists as much as possible. At 07:47 p.m. that same day, as recorded in the police report, Maréchal Philippe Pétain placed himself in the hands of Général Marie-Pierre Kœnig by crossing the border at Vallorbe, where in nearby Les Hôpitaux-Neufs, at the train station Gare des Hôpitaux-Neufs - Jougne, a special train was already waiting for his onward journey in France. In contrast to the Swiss border authorities, the French troops present did not salute Philippe Pétain. Général Kœnig also refused to shake the Maréchal's hand. At 09:30 p.m. the special train left Les Hôpitaux-Neufs towards Paris with the destination station Gare d'Igny, in the southwest of Paris.

=== Special missions and the concours diplomatique ===
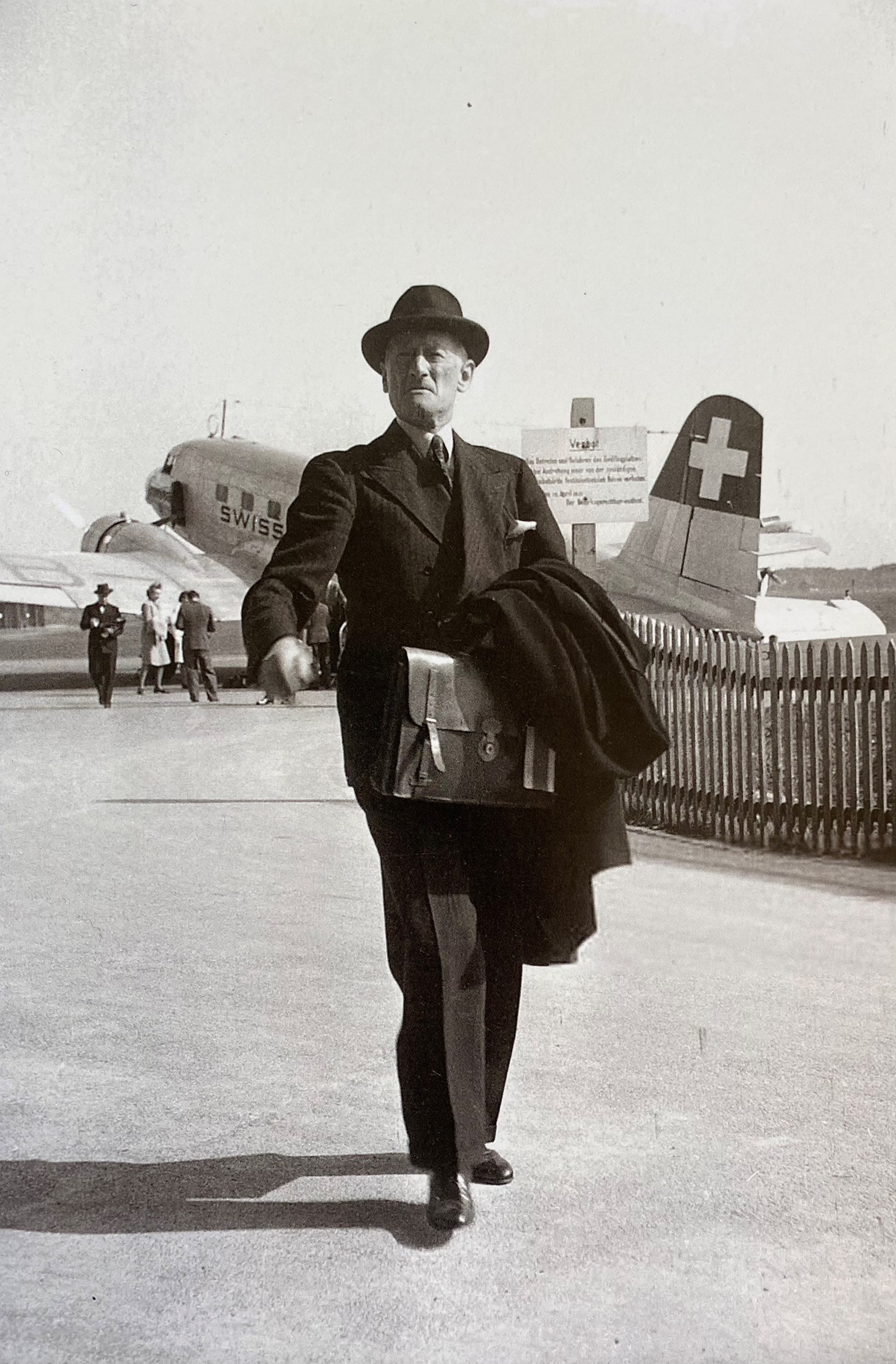
Walter Stucki at the Dübendorf Air Base during his mission for the Washington Agreement in 1946. Walter Stucki did not share William Rappard's enthusiasm. He remained modest, describing the agreement soberly as "acceptable for our country, but nothing more."

Since his return from France in 1944, Walter Stucki was the head of the Office of Foreign Affairs in the Federal Political Department (FPD). But as early as 1946, Federal Councillor Max Petitpierre appointed him delegate for special missions. On 25 May 1946, Walter Stucki achieved a remarkable compromise in the Washington Agreement on German assets in Switzerland claimed by the Allies. The agreement was a treaty between Switzerland and the victorious Western Allies – USA, Great Britain and France – that regulated the liquidation of German assets in Switzerland and prevented a boycott against the country. According to the treaty, Switzerland had to pay CHF 250 million for the reconstruction of Europe. In return, the Allies waived any further claims against the Swiss National Bank, whose activities during the war, especially the purchase of looted German gold, were controversial. In addition, Switzerland undertook to register the German assets blocked in Switzerland from 16 February 1945 onwards and to liquidate all assets held in Switzerland by Germans living in Germany. In this context, the Americans agreed to release the Swiss assets that had been blocked in the USA since 1941. The agreement was an important step for Switzerland out of its isolation and an important compromise that paved the way for its integration into the post-war order. In view of the outcome of the negotiations, which was due to the negotiating skills of Walter Stucki, William Rappard, diplomatic advisor to the Swiss delegation, described it as a diplomatic miracle, because the victorious Western Allies had given up a significant part of their harsh demands.

In 1953, Walter Stucki concluded his last international agreement for Switzerland with the London Agreement on German External Debts. After resigning as delegate, he reformed the training of the young Swiss diplomats. A task he completed in 1955, and which is seen as the democratisation of the diplomatic service. In Switzerland, of all places, with its republican self-image, the diplomatic service was for a long time in the very exclusive hands of sons of rich and influential, and mostly patrician, families. This era is called the era of the gentlemen diplomats. The key point of the revision of the admission to the diplomatic service is the multi-stage admission competition, the concours diplomatique, which also includes an internship at a Swiss embassy. In 1956, the first diplomats began their training under the new regulations.

"It is true that, until relatively recently, Swiss diplomacy was primarily the preserve of members of noble and wealthy families."

— Walter Stucki

== Publications (partial list) ==
In German

- Die schweizerischen Effektenbörsen während und nach dem Weltkrieg 1914–1921, 1924
- Der schweizerische Gewerkschaftsbund in der Kriegszeit (1914–1920), 1928
- Von Pétain zur Vierten Republik, Verlag Herbert Lang & Cie., Bern, 1947

In French

- La fin du régime de Vichy, Éditions de la Baconnière, Neuchâtel, 1947
- La fin du régime de Vichy, réédition aux Éditions de la Baconnière, 2020, avec introduction de Marc Perrenoud
