= Schloss Höhenried =

Castle in Bavaria, Germany

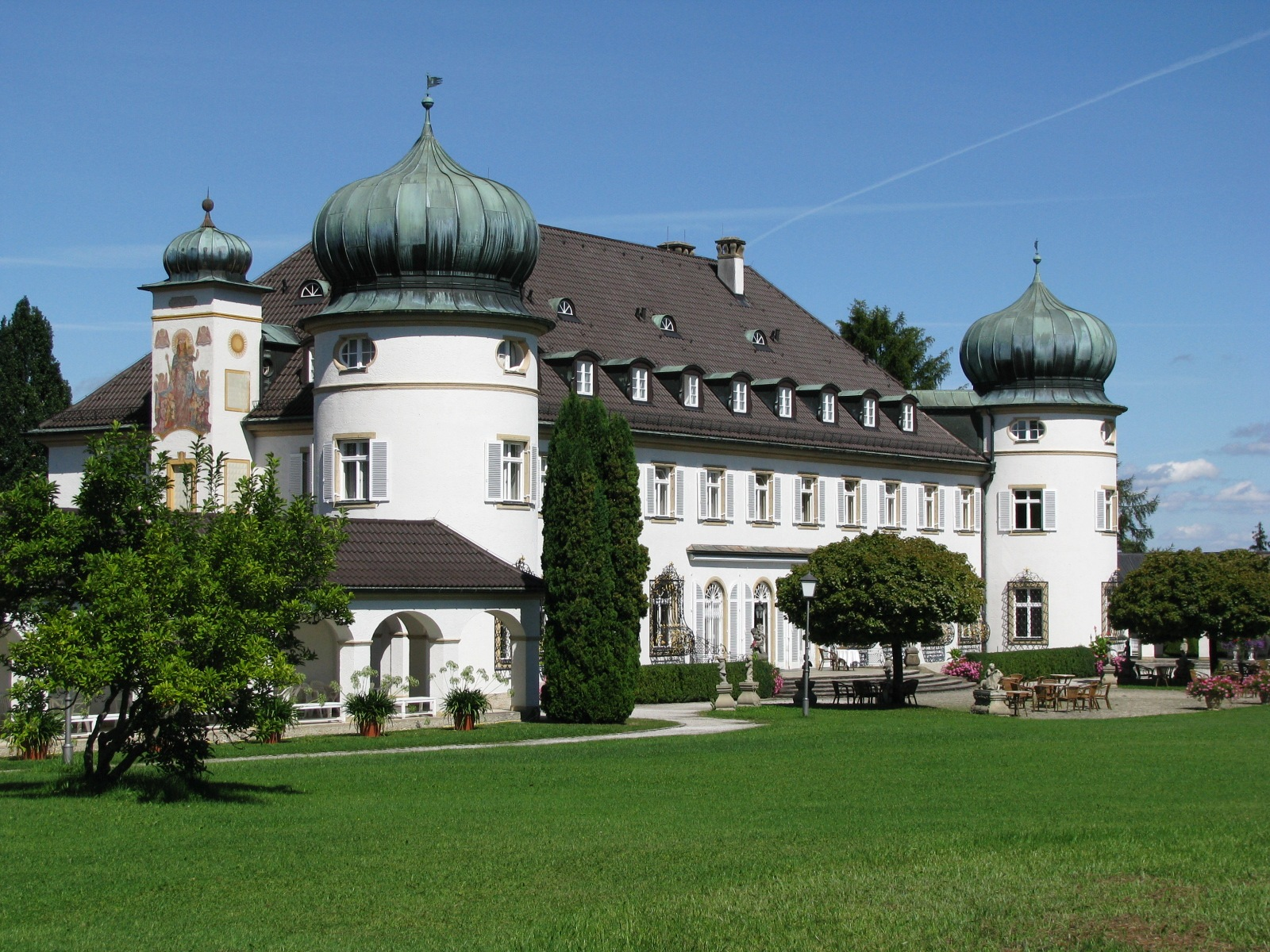
- The garden façade of Schloss Höhenried
- Interactive map of the Schloss Höhenried area

General information
- Type: Schloss (castle)
- Location: Höhenried 1, Bernried, Bavaria, Germany
- Coordinates: 47.8768°N 11.2854°E
- Construction started: 1937
- Completed: 1939
- Owner: Deutsche Rentenversicherung Bayern Süd

Design and construction
- Architect: Michael Aicher

The Schloss Höhenried is a very large country house from the first half of the 20th century, which is called a Schloss (castle) due to its size and baroque architecture. Schloss Höhenried is located in the Höhenrieder Park in Bernried in Bavaria. The Munich architect Michael Aicher designed the castle-like villa in 1937, whose axis is oriented southeast towards the shoreline of the Starnberger See and the Alpine Foreland. The castles of Schwindegg and Tüßling as well as the Villa Heidinger in Pöcking are considered models for Schloss Höhenried. The building, which was completed shortly before the outbreak of World War II, is considered the last castle built in Bavaria. The entire complex is listed under file number D-1-90-115-21.

In the final months of World War II, Schloss Höhenried housed the Swiss Legation after its evacuation from war-torn Berlin.

== History ==
In 1914, while hunting with her husband August Eduard Scharrer (1880–1932), a Württemberg reserve officer and horse lover, the German-American Wilhelmina Busch (1884–1952), daughter of Adolphus Busch, and therefore heiress to the Anheuser-Busch fortune, discovered the area around the Starnberger See. Shortly thereafter, in the same year, she purchased the estates Bernried and Adelsried from Freiherr Maximilian von Wendland for 1.5 million Goldmarks. Furthermore, in 1927, Wilhelmina Busch had the opportunity to buy the Höhenrieder Park adjacent to her property. The location seemed ideal to her to realise her dream of a castle on the Starnberger See. But at first it seemed hopeless to obtain a building permit in this landscape conservation area.

=== Munich in exchange for Höhenried ===
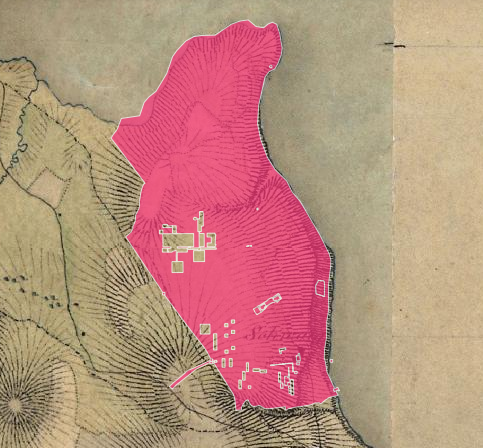
Site plan of the Schloss Höhenried Estate (construction planning situation of 2019). Wilhelmina Busch always called Schloss Höhenried her replacement for the house at 27 Von-der-Tann-Strasse in Munich, which had been demolished at the request of the state. This was her personal justification for her claim to the building permit in the Höhenrieder Park.

On 24 September 1932, August Eduard Scharrer died. The following year, Wilhelmina Busch married her doctor, Carl Borchard. She now concentrated fully on her dream of building a castle in Höhenried. Chance came to her aid.

Adolf Hitler had ordered that the widening of the Von-der-Tann-Strasse in Munich had to be completed by the opening of the Haus der Deutschen Kunst on 18 July 1937. The street was to be widened from 11 meters to 27 meters and thus developed into a Via Triumphalis. Therefore, the private properties numbers 17 to 27 on the south side of the street had to be demolished by the end of March 1937 at the latest. Wilhelmina Busch was the owner of house number 27, which she had purchased in 1926 for 90,000 Reichsmarks. She initially asked for a price of 272,000 Reichsmarks from the state of Bavaria. However, finally she agreed on 175,000 Reichsmarks on the condition, that the state of Bavaria grants her the building permit for Schloss Höhenried and the permits for the import of the building materials (Germany had already imposed restrictions on raw materials in 1937, which also applied to imports). Otherwise, she threatened to personally contact Adolf Hitler – whom she knew and whom her first husband had supported financially in the 1920s – and to move back to the United States. Due to her considerable wealth and social influence reaching into the highest circles of politics and business, the threat had the desired effect. She received the building permit for Schloss Höhenried, and the German state continued to reap large profits from Wilhelmina Busch's American foreign currency.

A memorandum held in the Munich State Archives, addressed to the Minister President of Bavaria, at the time called Reichsstatthalter, Franz, Ritter von Epp, states: "The matter has been definitively settled, thereby obviating the necessity of a formal expropriation procedure and additional measures."

=== Construction phase of the last castle in Bavaria by the last Queen of Bavaria ===
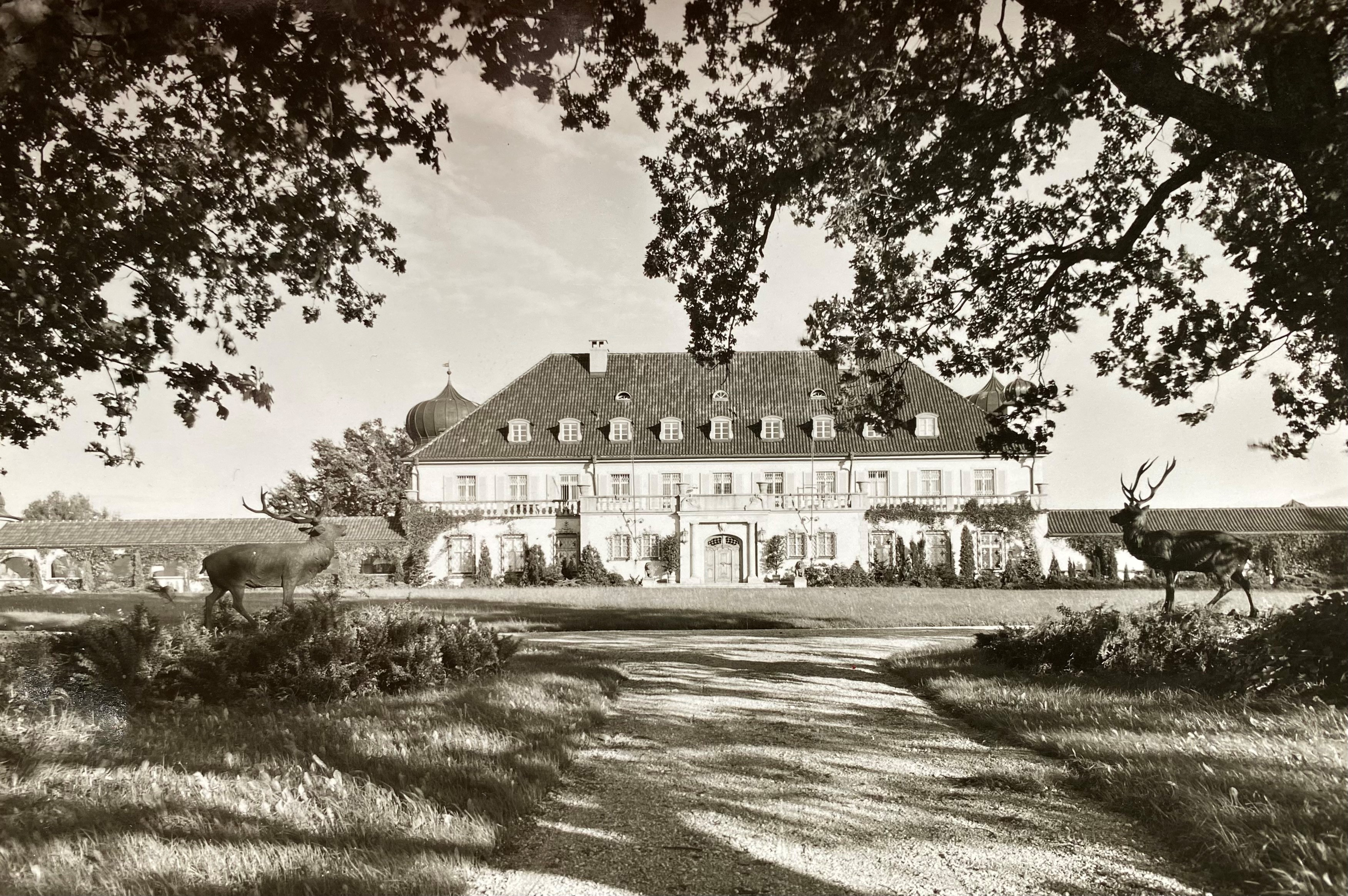
The entrance of Schloss Höhenried in the early second half of the 20th century.

In 1937, under the supervision of the architect Michael Aicher and the construction manager Hans Nüchter, the construction of Schloss Höhenried began. The topping out ceremony took place in February 1938, and the building was completed shortly before the outbreak of World War II. The construction price of the complex was originally estimated at 300,000 Reichsmarks. However, due to the numerous extravagances indulged in by Wilhelmina Busch during the construction phase, the price doubled, according to Hans Nüchter. However, money was no issue in the construction of Schloss Höhenried. At the same time as the castle, Wilhelmina Busch also had a large boathouse built on the shores of the Starnberger See for her new 21-meter private yacht, the Höhenried – the largest on the lake. It was at this time that Wilhelmina Busch was nicknamed the "last Queen of Bavaria".

==== Extravagances ====
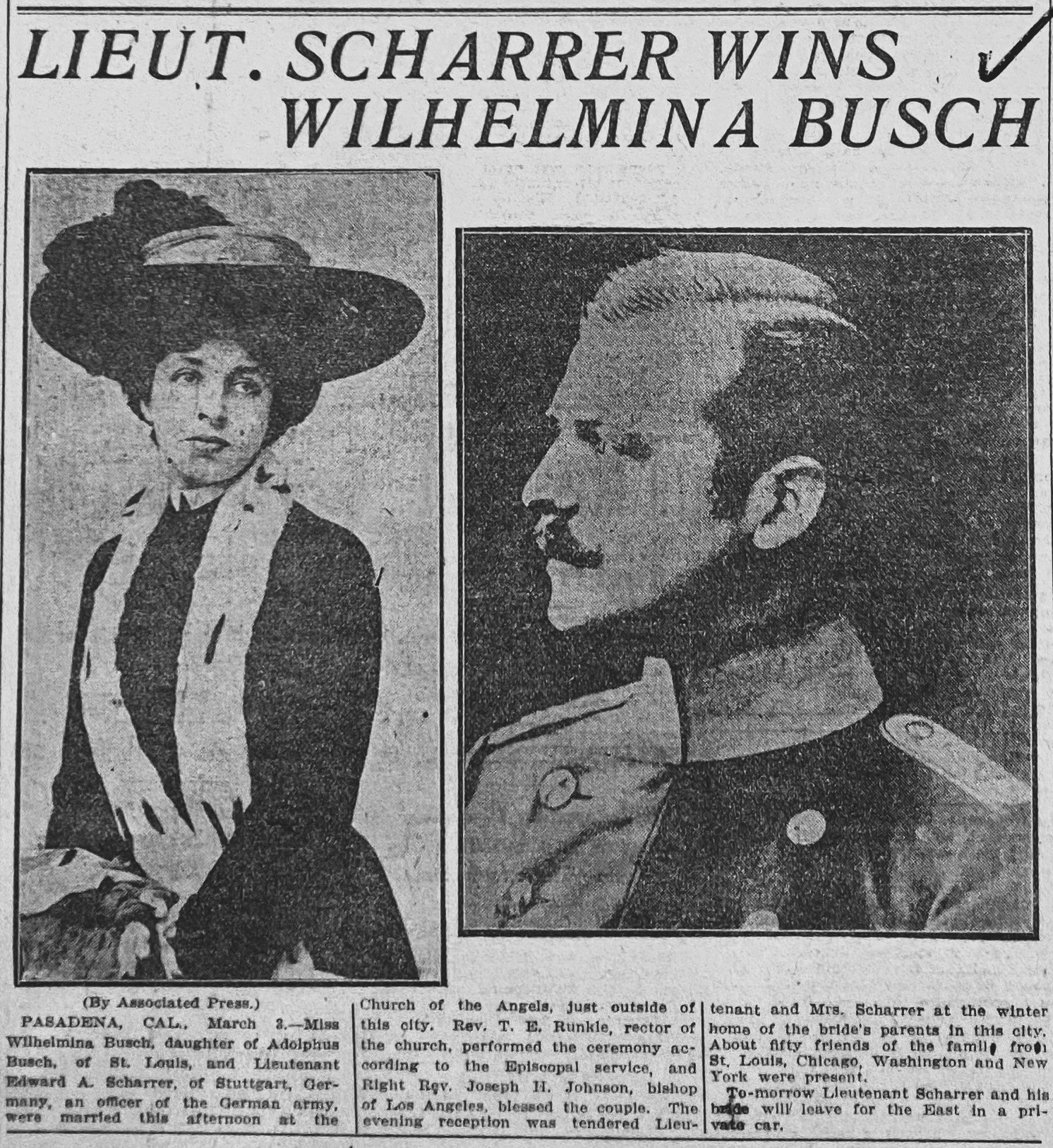
The wedding announcement of Wilhelmina Busch (1884–1952) and her first husband August Eduard Scharrer (1880–1932) in the Richmond Times-Dispatch on 4 March 1906. Wilhelmina Busch was the aunt of August A. Busch.

Wilhelmina Busch exerted considerable influence on the construction. The architect had originally intended to build the castle parallel to the lakeshore and the foundations had already been completed. Wilhelmina Busch reversed these plans and had the castle oriented to the south. She also insisted on using Czech copper for the roofs. The Grünthaler copper is known for its beautiful and rapid oxidation. However, due to the 1937 German decree, this war-critical material was neither allowed to be used for private buildings nor imported by private individuals from abroad. With a special permit from Hermann Göring, Wilhelmina Busch was allowed to import the copper via England. Hermann Göring's condition: He wanted half of the ordered copper for the construction of his hunting lodge, Carinhall.

=== Interiors ===
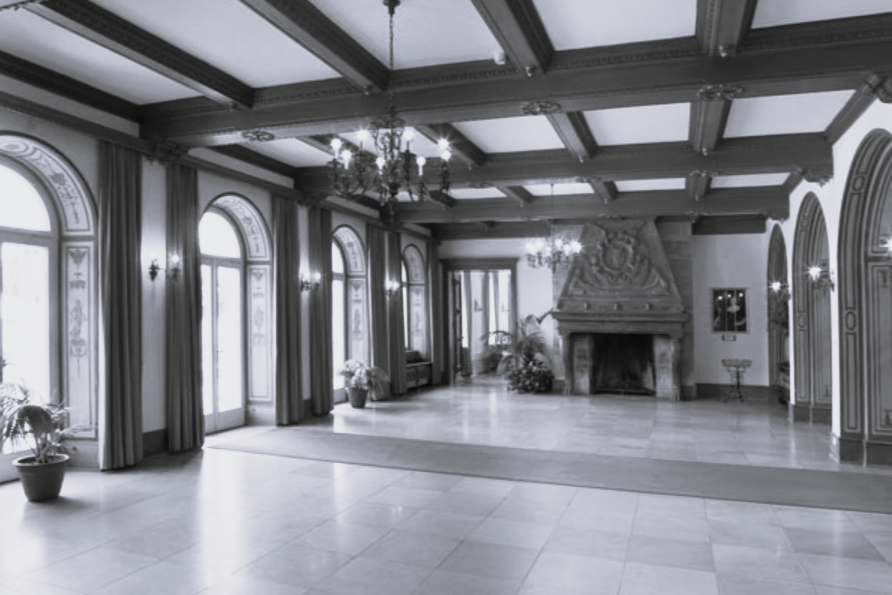
The Kaminzimmer at Schloss Höhenried, located between the double-height entrance hall and the arched French doors opening onto the garden.

The centuries-old oak avenue leads to the entrance of Schloss Höhenried. Through the vestibule and the adjoining large double-height entrance hall with its grand staircase, one reaches the former state rooms on the ground floor. The focal point is the Kaminzimmer (drawing room), which occupies the center of the garden front and terrace. To the sides are the dining room, the parlour and the study. The former private rooms are on the upper floor and the servants' rooms were in the attic. In the vaulted basement, besides the large kitchen and a storeroom, there were also rooms used for entertainment, including a bowling alley and the Rittersaal (Knights' Hall), the only room that still retains its original furnishings from the time of Wilhelmina Busch.

Wilhelmina Busch had the castle furnished with numerous historical architectural elements as well as antiques and works of art that she had purchased on her many travels. These include an Italian entrance portal from the 17th century, numerous antique fireplaces and a Byzantine chapel from Corfu.

=== Schloss Höhenried in the service of the Swiss Confederation ===
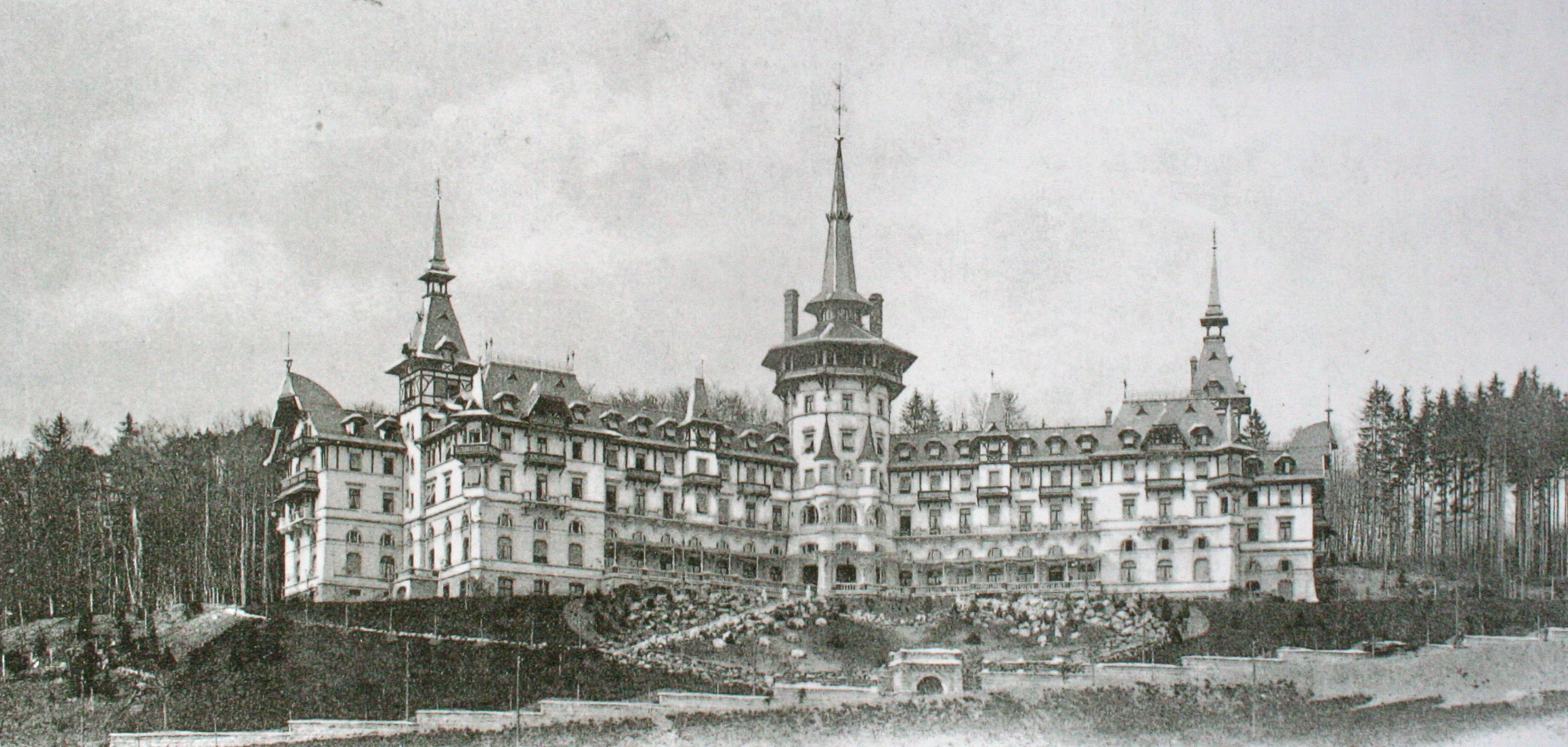
The Grand Hotel Dolder. Wilhelmina Busch's residence in Zurich.

As the US entry into the war became increasingly likely, Wilhelmina Busch began preparing to move to Switzerland. Before her departure in 1941, however, she divorced her husband, Carl Borchard, from whom she had been separated for some time. She initially lived in Lugano. When her widowed sister Clara von Gontard (1876–1959) moved to Zurich, she also moved there and lived at the Grand Hotel Dolder. However, she kept her German passport and returned to Schloss Höhenried several times during the war. During her absence, she entrusted her maid, Anna Hartwich, with the supervision of the estate.

==== Confiscation of Schloss Höhenried and Wilhelmina Busch's activities in Zurich ====
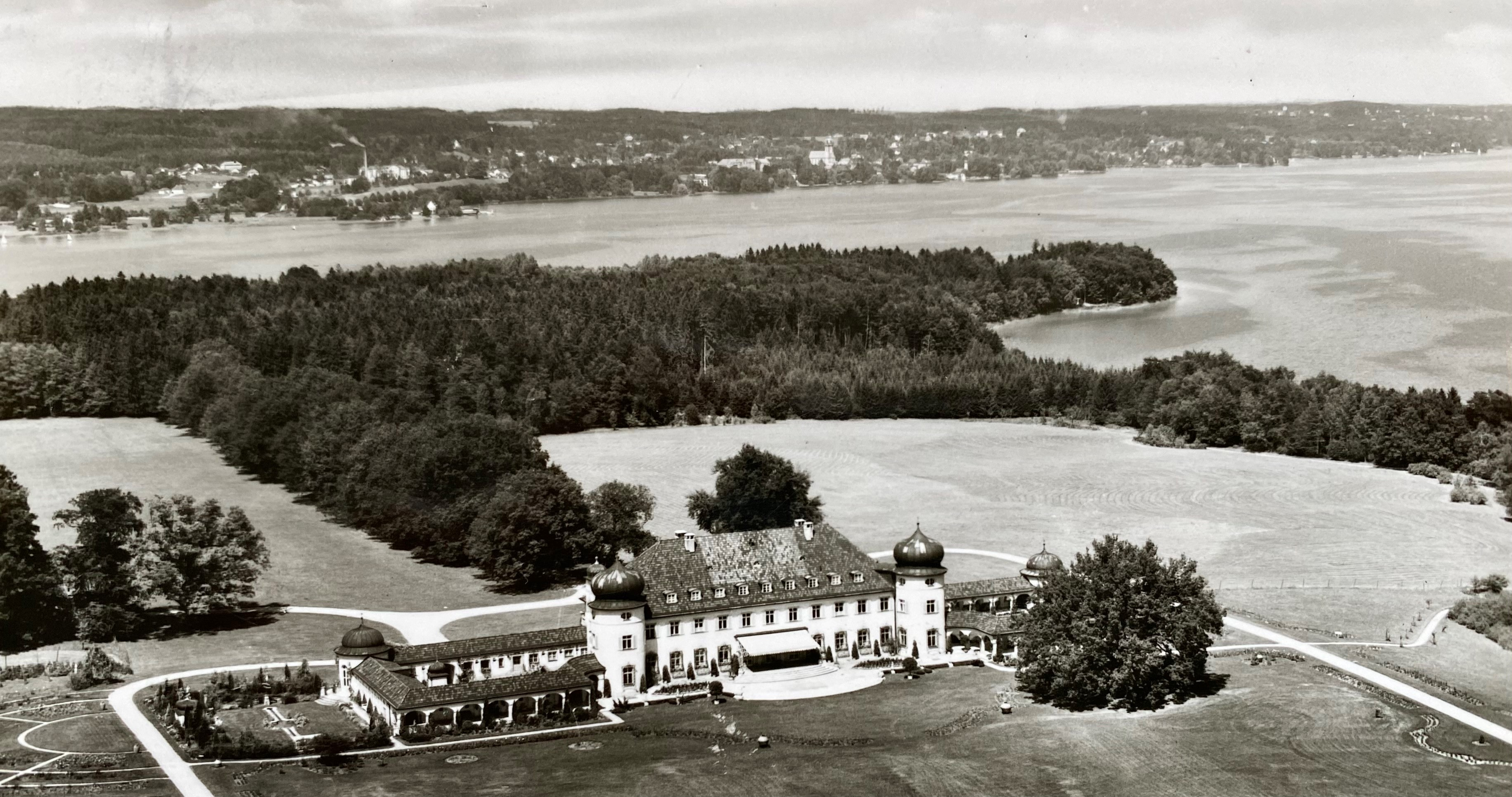
The Schloss Höhenried Estate and the Starnberger See in the early second half of the 20th century. The light discolouration on the roof shows the spot where the white tarpaulin with the red cross was attached to mark the castle as a hospital during the war.

Schloss Höhenried did not remain empty for long. The buildings were confiscated and on 1 September 1943, the Orthopedic Clinic from Munich of LMU Munich took up residence there for two years. To mark the castle's use as a hospital, a large white tarpaulin with a red cross was stretched over the roof in the hope that this would protect the building from air raids. Wilhelmina Busch was awarded an annual compensation of 62,170 Reichsmarks for the use of Schloss Höhenried. Money that Wilhelmina Busch would have needed. Due to her involvement with high-ranking representatives of the Nazi regime, she was no longer able to transfer money from the US to Switzerland. She was on a blacklist. The same also applied to the compensation payment from Germany for the use of Schloss Höhenried (the money was deposited into a blocked account). Only thanks to her acquaintance with the US Consul General Sam E. Woods (1892–1953) in Zurich in 1942, she managed to get off this blacklist, so she had access to her assets again. In this way, the Consul General thanked Wilhelmina Busch for helping him, through a Catholic dignitary, to establish contact with a German spy in 1943, who informed him about the German weapons development during this crucial phase of the war.

Sam E. Woods was not only a diplomat, but also an agent. The US Consul General succeeded in building a dense network of contacts in Berlin. These included Wolf-Heinrich Ferdinand, Graf von Helldorff, Bernhard Berghaus (1896–1966), a German industrialist, and Erwin Respondek (1894–1971), a German economist. His greatest intelligence success came when Erwin Respondek, whom Sam E. Woods always referred to in his documents only by his code name Ralph for security reasons, informed him in January 1941 about the German attack plans against the Soviet Union, code name: Operation Barbarossa.

==== Wilhelmina Busch's ingenious plan: The relocation of the Swiss Legation to Schloss Höhenried ====
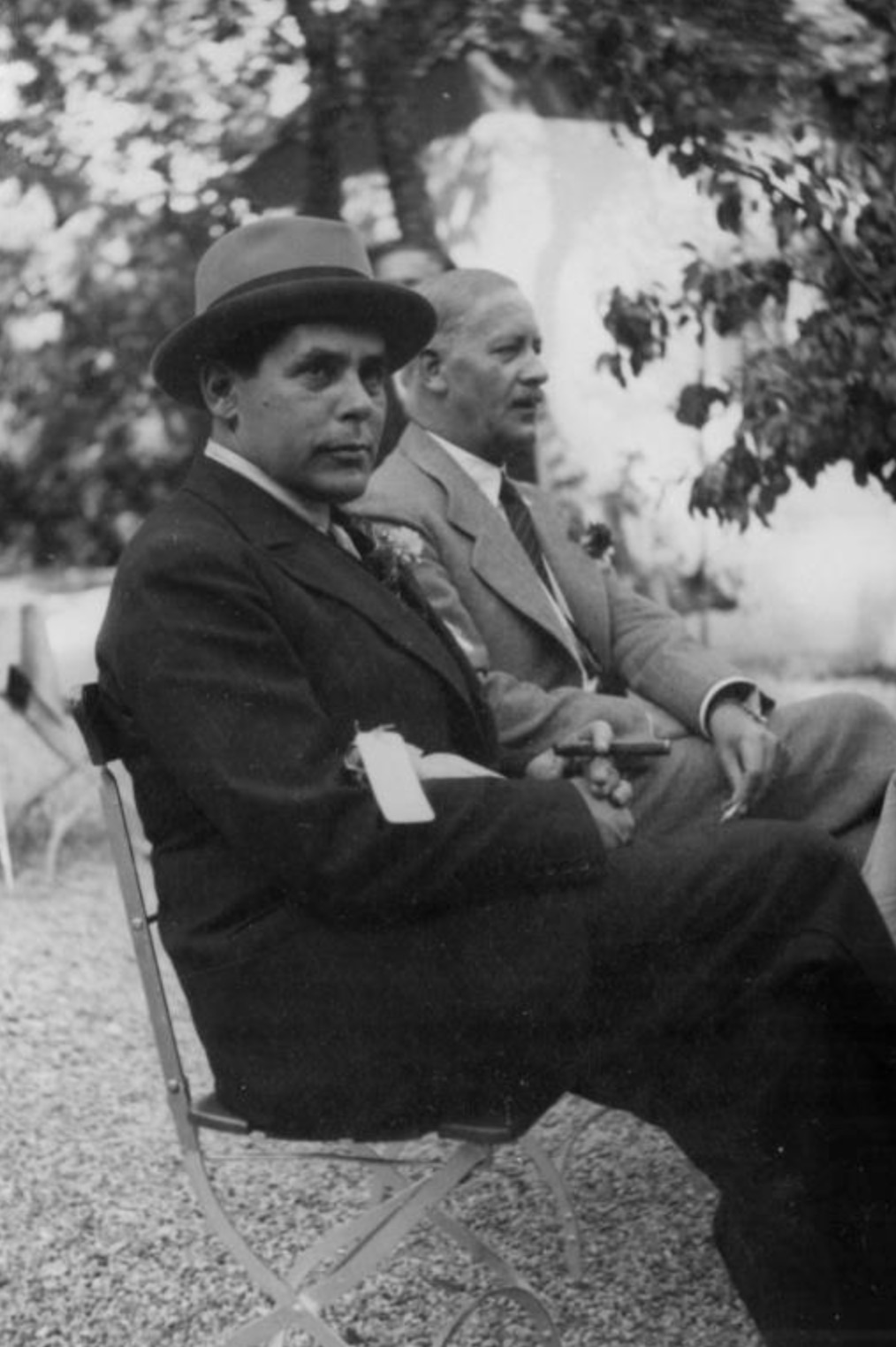
Minister Hans Frölicher, Envoy of the Swiss Confederation to the German Reich from 1938 to 1945, photographed at the Conference of the Swiss envoys in Switzerland in 1937. On 22 April 1945, the Germans contacted the Swiss Legation at Schloss Höhenried regarding the evacuation of Maréchal Philippe Pétain from Germany to Switzerland. The next day, the evacuation of the Maréchal to Switzerland began under the supervision of Walter Stucki and with the participation of Hans K. Frey (1916–1974), an employee of the Swiss Legation at Schloss Höhenried. Hans K. Frey did not enter the diplomatic service until 1946.

Wilhelmina Busch observed the course of the war very closely. To prevent the destruction of Schloss Höhenried, she again used the contacts that had once put her on the blacklist. The aim was for neutral Switzerland to relocate its legation from war-torn Berlin to Schloss Höhenried so that the castle would become Swiss territory and thus be protected from destruction.

Wilhelmina Busch had launched the plan through her relatives. Her niece Lillyclaire Berghaus, née von Gontard (1910–1986), the daughter of Paul von Gontard (1868–1941), who was the former general director of the Deutsche Waffen- und Munitionsfabriken, and Clara von Gontard (1876–1959), Wilhelmina Buschs's sister, was married to the German arms manufacturer Bernhard Berghaus (1896–1966), who, on behalf of Heinrich Himmler, was also responsible for handling the arms deliveries from Swiss arms companies to Germany, first and foremost: Oerlikon-Bührle. His wife and children had lived in Zurich since the beginning of the war. Bernhard Berghaus, in turn, was in close contact with the Swiss envoy in Berlin, Minister Hans Frölicher. As early as 1943, Bernhard Berghaus had placed Schloss Großwudicke in Milower Land, a manor house built in 1735 – refurbished in 1882 and demolished in 1973 – at the disposal of the Swiss Legation for the duration of the Allied air raids in Berlin. The manor house was bought by Paul von Gontard, the father of Lillyclaire Berghaus, in 1916. Schloss Großwudicke also became known as a meeting place for Heinrich Himmler and Ernst Röhm in March 1934.

While Minister Peter Anton Feldscher (1889–1979), head of the Department for Protecting Power Mandates at the Swiss Legation, withdrew to Schloss Großwudicke, Minister Hans Frölicher, the Envoy of the Swiss Confederation, with a few diplomats and staff withdrew to Schloss Börnicke in Börnicke, now a district of Bernau bei Berlin. The castle had been commissioned by the banker Paul von Mendelssohn-Bartholdy from the architect Bruno Paul.

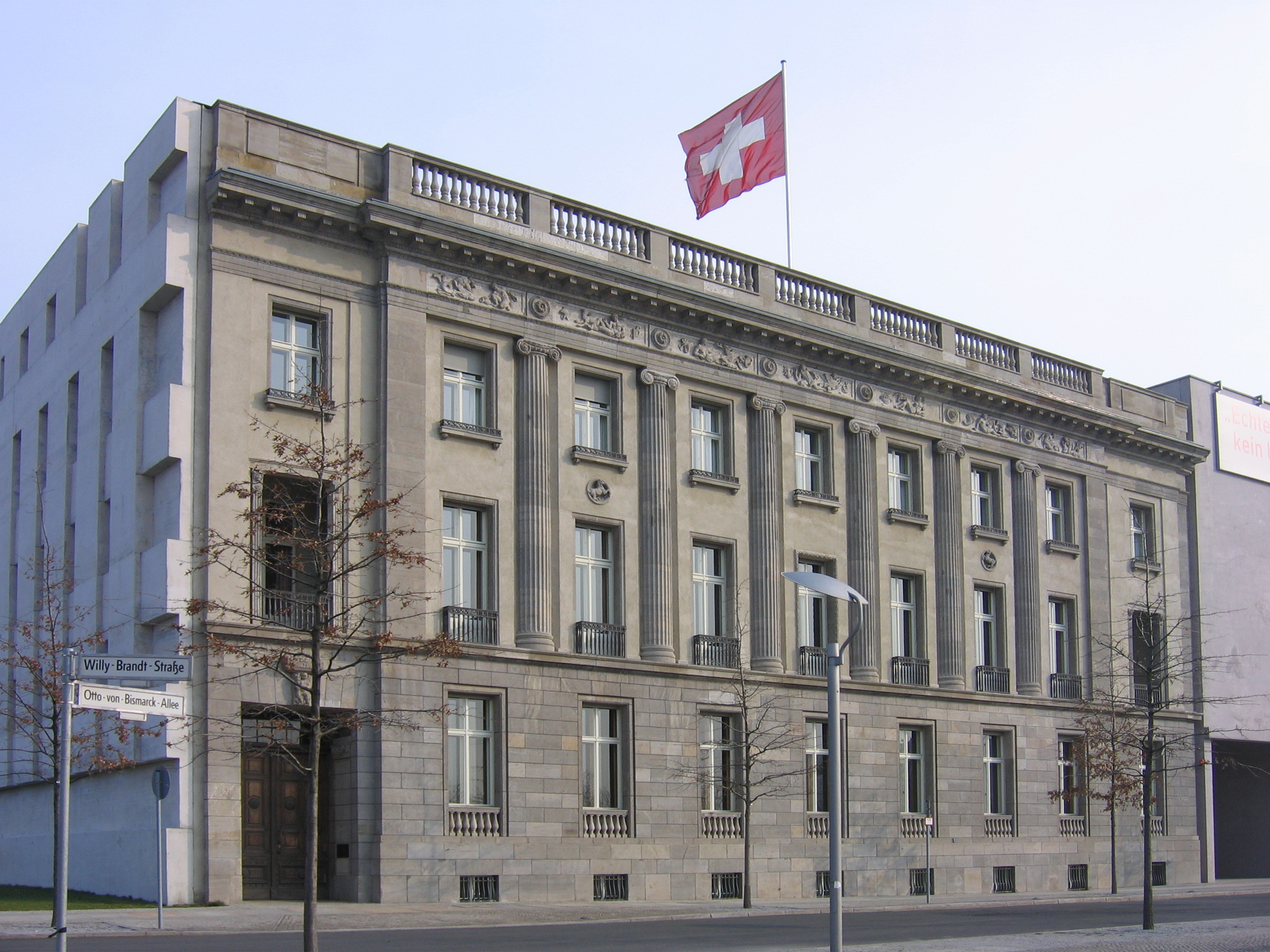
The Villa Kunheim in Berlin, seat of the Legation – later Embassy – of the Swiss Confederation since 1919. When the Battle of Berlin intensified significantly in March 1945, the Swiss Legation was relocated to Schloss Höhenried. It is one of the few buildings around the Reichstag that survived World War II with only minor damage. The first ambassador of the Swiss Confederation to the Federal Republic of Germany after the German reunification, with seat again at the Villa Kunheim, was Thomas Borer.

The operations of the Swiss Legation in Berlin continued throughout the war, albeit with a reduced staff. The legation staff, who continued to work at least partially at the chancery in the Villa Kunheim, had to be housed closer to Berlin. Most of them were quartered in West Berlin, in the Kladow district.

All the alternative accommodations of the Swiss Legation were located in spacious, stately homes, which were offered to Switzerland. During this critical phase of the war, wealthy Germans were keen to house diplomats in their properties, hoping that the houses would thereby enjoy a certain degree of protection. Switzerland, as a neutral state and holder of several protecting power mandates, was particularly popular for this purpose.

When the Soviet army was about to take Berlin and part of the Swiss Legation was to be evacuated to southern Germany, Bernhard Berghaus, on behalf of Wilhelmina Busch, offered Minister Hans Frölicher the guest house of Schloss Höhenried, Haus Alt Höhenried, as an alternative (the castle was still occupied by the clinic. In addition, part of it was used as a hospital for soldiers). The Swiss envoy gratefully accepted. On 27 March 1945, after consultation between Minister Hans Frölicher and Gauleiter Paul Giesler, who approved the temporary location of the Swiss Legation, the Swiss envoy arrived at Schloss Höhenried with a few diplomats and staff, including Hans K. Frey (1916–1974).

Upon arrival at Schloss Höhenried, Minister Hans Frölicher discovered that they first had to clear out the Haus Alt Höhenried. Because Schloss Höhenreid was being used as a military hospital, the Haus Alt Höhenried was serving as a furniture storage facility. However, the many surplus furnishings could be distributed among other buildings on the Schloss Höhenried Estate.

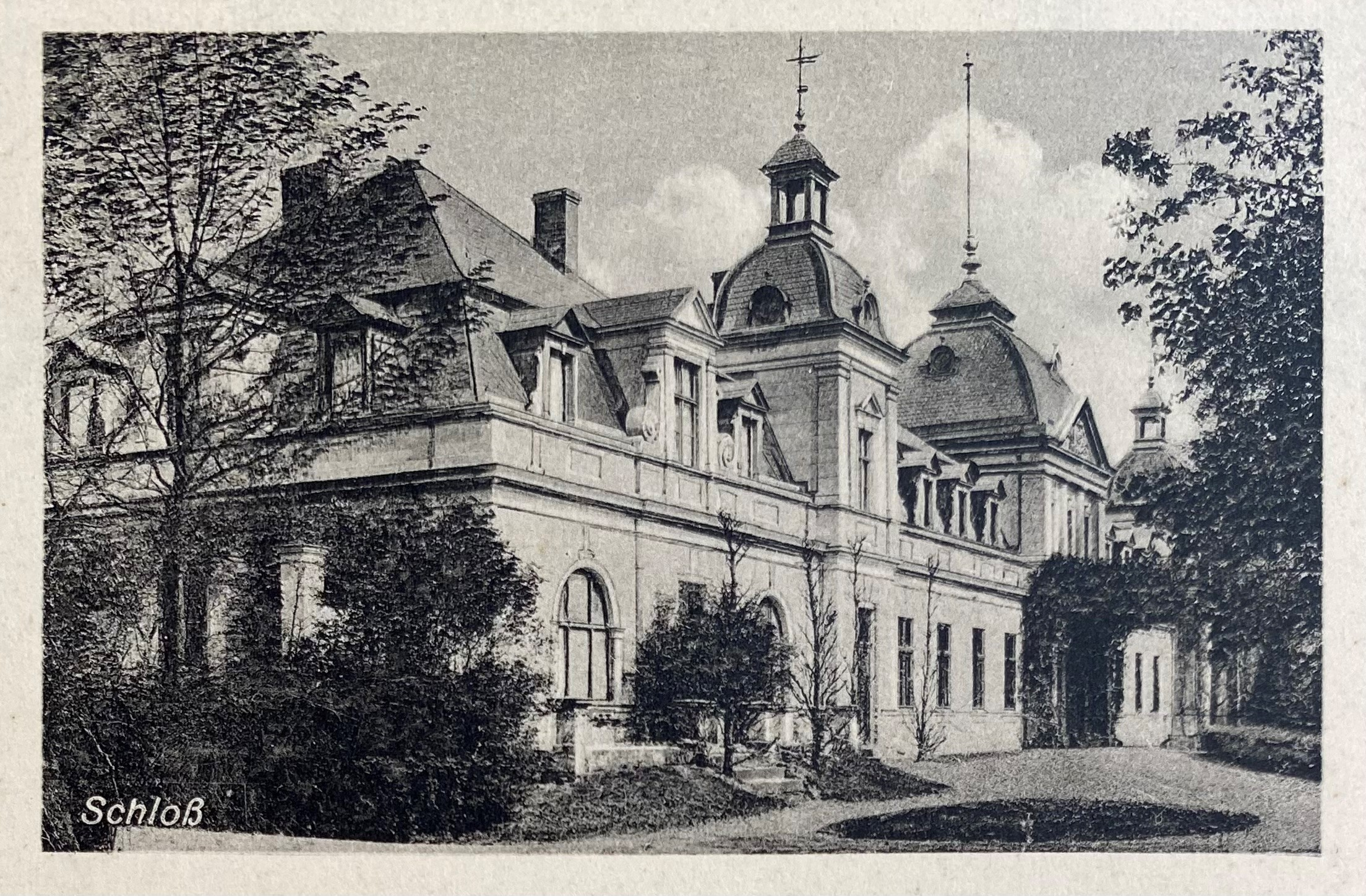
Schloss Großwudicke in Milower Land in the 1930s. From 1943 until the relocation to Schloss Höhenried in March 1945, it served as a temporary accommodation for the Swiss Legation during the war (seat of Minister Peter Anton Feldscher (1889–1979), head of the Department for Protecting Power Mandates). The castle was demolished in 1973.

According to Minister Hans Frölicher, the Federal Political Department (FPD) in Bern initially had difficulty with the many different names associated with the Schloss Höhenried Estate. The temporary address of the Swiss Legation was therefore also given as "Althöhenruh" or "Bernruh", fictitious word combinations of the various properties of the estate. Even if the name wasn't always correctly written on the letters and parcels, the mail always arrived. This was because the mayor of Bernried knew how to use the presence of the Swiss Legation to protect the entire community. He had signs with the English inscription "To the Swiss Legation" posted throughout the town and on its access roads.

Wilhelmina Busch's plan worked. Thanks to the presence of the Swiss Legation and the associated diplomatic extraterritoriality, the impact of the American capture of Bernried on 30 April 1945, and the subsequent occupation was limited. The Swiss Legation remained at Schloss Höhenried until 22 May 1945. However, Minister Hans Frölicher had already been informed of his recall to Bern two weeks earlier, on 8 May 1945. At the same time, the Federal Council declared that it would no longer recognise the German government. After Minister Hans Frölicher and his delegation had returned to Switzerland on 23 May 1945, the grateful Wilhelmina Busch invited everyone to lunch at the Grand Hotel Dolder, where she still resided.

=== Return to Schloss Höhenried: The glamorous post-war years ===
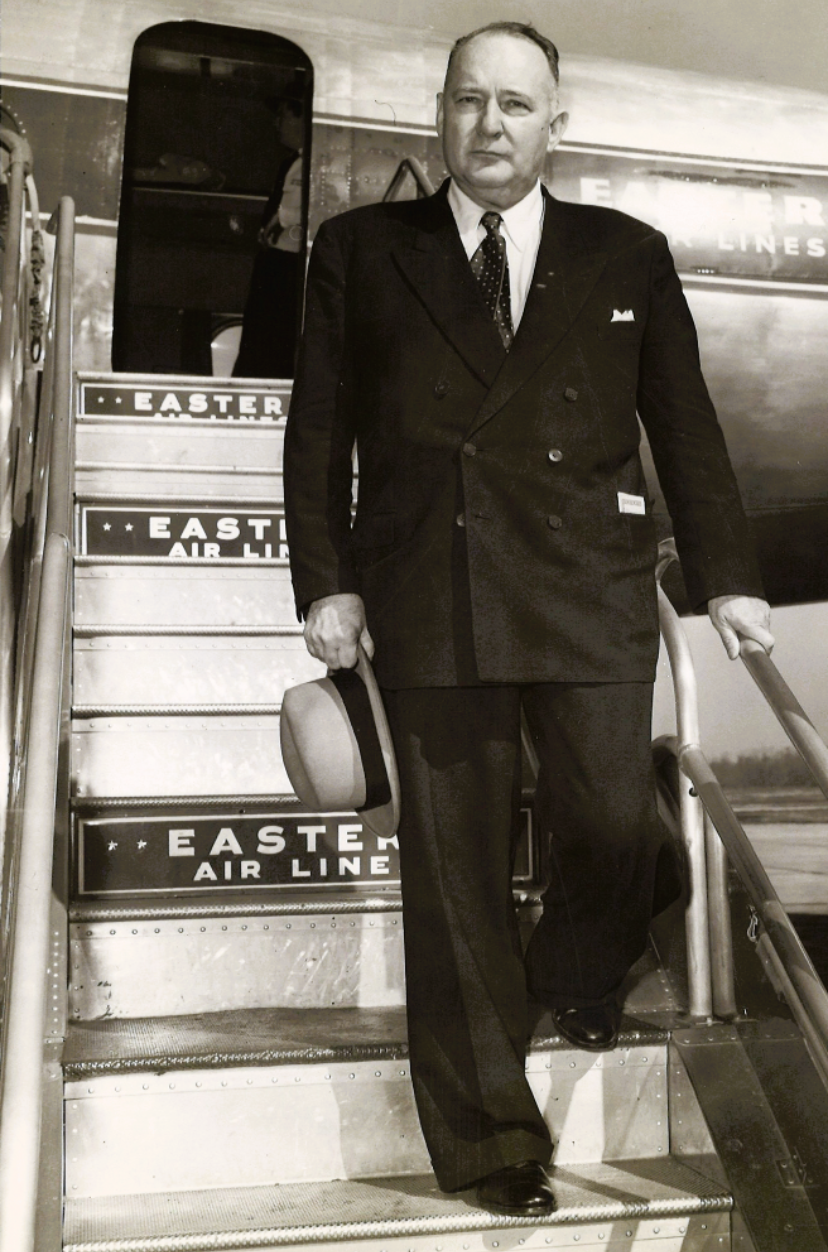
US Consul General Sam E. Woods (1892–1953) in the 1940s. He skillfully used Schloss Höhenried to establish German-American friendship in the postwar period.

At the end of the war, the clinic moved out of Schloss Höhenried. Subsequently, the Americans confiscated the castle to house flight officers from the Fürstenfeldbruck Air Base. On 31 March 1946, the Americans also moved out, and Wilhelmina Busch got her castle back.

==== In the service of German-American friendship ====
The first major social event at Schloss Höhenried was the wedding of Wilhelmina Busch and the US Consul General Sam E. Woods on 22 February 1948. The two had met at the Hotel Baur au Lac in Zurich in 1942. After the war, Sam E. Woods was posted to the US Consulate General in Munich. Among the wedding guests were General George S. Patton and Rupprecht, Kronprinz von Bayern.

In the following years, several receptions, evening parties and opulent celebrations with prominent guests took place at Schloss Höhenried with up to 2,500 guests, including the Minister President of Bavaria, Hans Ehard, the Minister of Culture and Education and President of the Landtag of Bavaria, Alois Hundhammer and his son Richard (1927–2012), the President of Germany, Theodor Heuss, the Chancellor of Germany, Konrad Adenauer, General Lucius D. Clay, General George C. Marshall and the Commissioner of the French Plan Commission and later President of the High Authority of the European Coal and Steel Community, Jean Monnet. Judging by the guest lists, these social events often focused on Germany's political and economic future. Consul General Sam E. Woods was a sought-after discussion partner for the Germans.

=== Nationalpark Bernried and Schlosspark ===
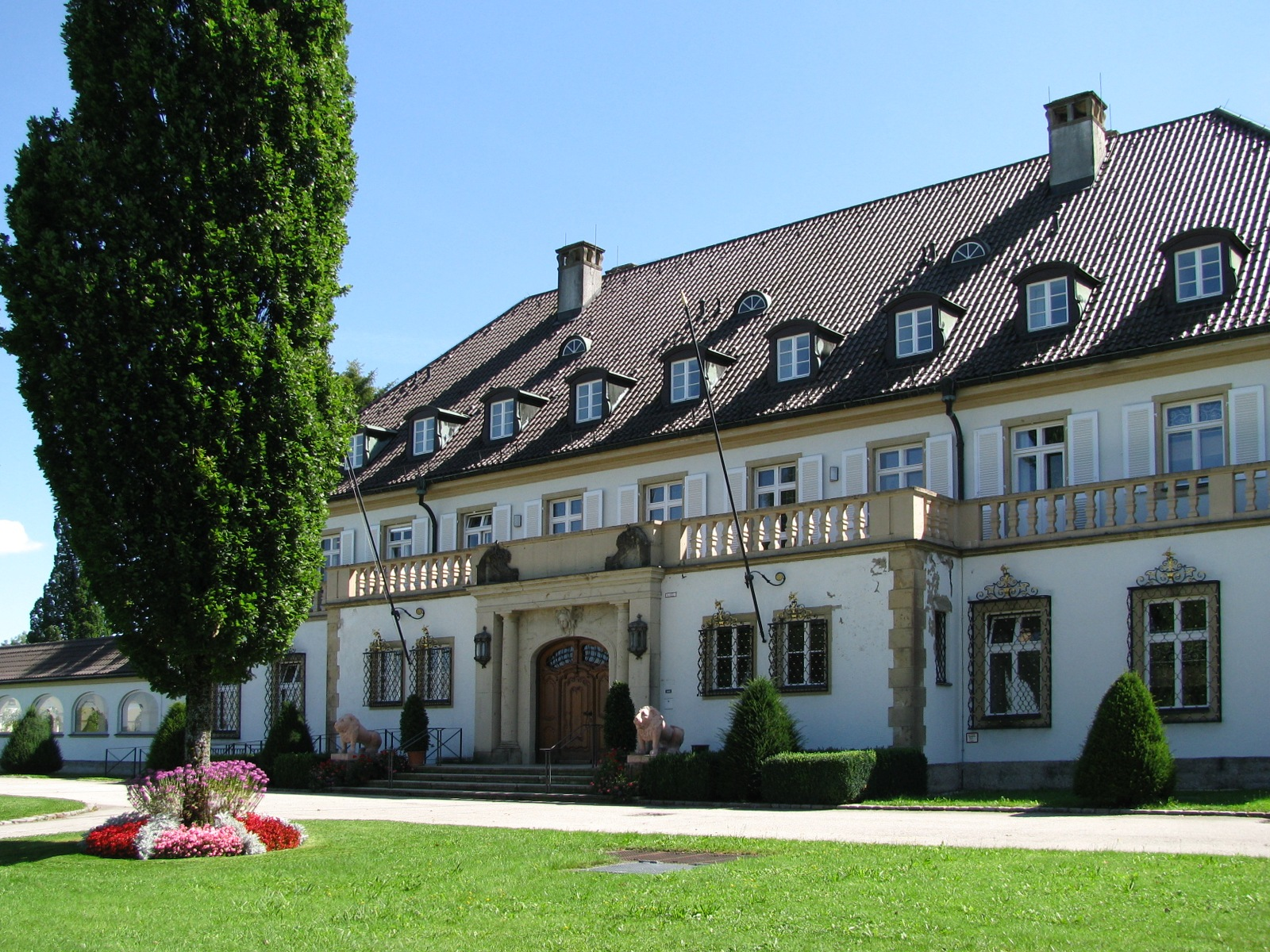
Schloss Höhenried, main entrance.

After returning to Schloss Höhenried, Wilhelmina Busch and Sam E. Woods set about redesigning the grounds. A pond and a private zoo were created. At Sam E. Woods's suggestion, the Mississippi Grounds were created in the southern part of the Höhenrieder Park – a terraced area sloping down to the lake with five ponds separated by dams. Furthermore, white fallow deer were settled in an approximately 200-hectare enclosure.

In 1950, the childless Wilhelmina Busch donated around 80 hectares of her property south of Bernried to the Nationalpark Bernried Foundation with the stipulation that no further changes to the park would be permitted in the future. On the same time the park was opened to the public. From 24 August 1952, Wilhelmina Busch also opened the Schlosspark (castle gardens) of Schloss Höhenried to the public.

=== Death, sale and the end of an era ===
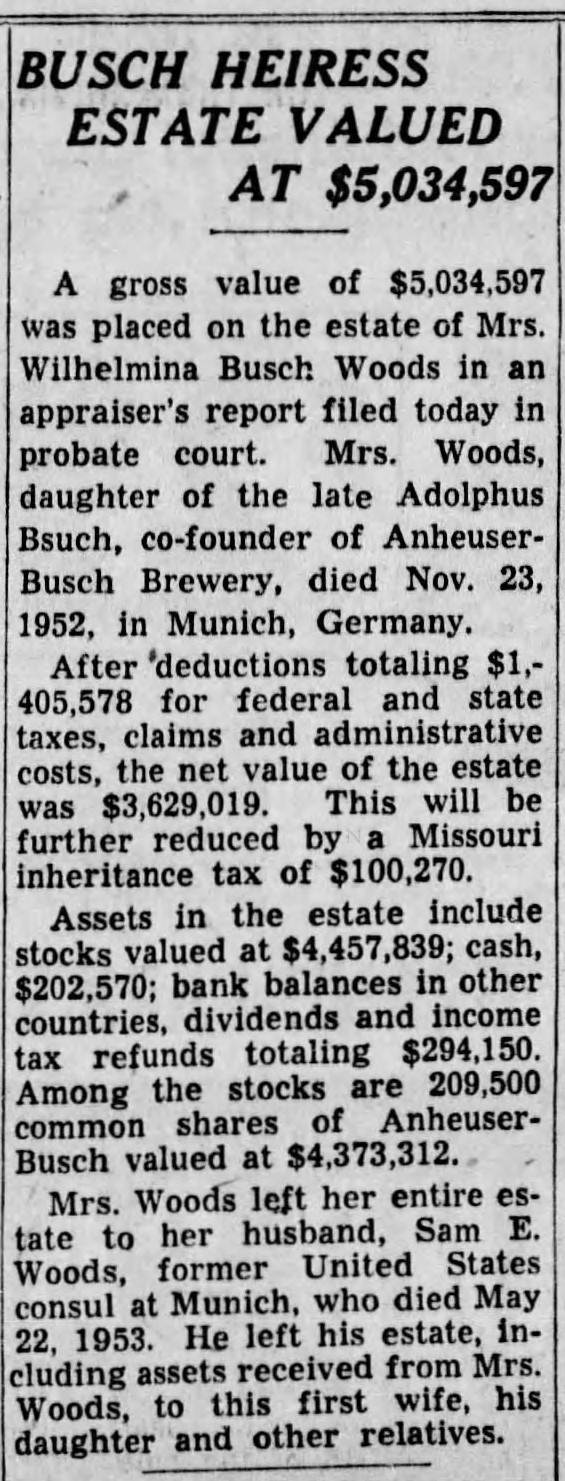
Details of the Busch-Woods estate in the St. Louis Post-Dispatch of 16 November 1954.

Wilhelmina Busch died on 21 November 1952 in Munich. Her husband, Sam E. Woods, also died in Munich on 22 May 1953. Schloss Höhenried and the remaining considerable assets were inherited by a community of heirs consisting of relatives of Sam E. Woods, including his daughter from his first marriage, Kathi-Rose Woods McClendan (1918–2020). Since the members of the community of heirs had no interest in preserving the castle, Schloss Höhenried was put up for sale. Although there were repeated rumors about wealthy private individuals being interested in purchasing Schloss Höhenried, with the names of important German industrial families being mentioned in particular, including Friedrich Flick, the considerable maintenance costs ultimately deterred them from purchasing the property.

From 6 to 10 September 1955, the entire inventory of Schloss Höhenried was sold at an on-site auction, conducted by the auctioneer Hugo Ruef from the Bavarian auction house of the same name. Only the furnishings of the Rittersaal (Knight's Hall) survived. Why they were not sold as part of the major auction is no longer known today. The proceeds amounted to around 500,000 Deutsche Marks. An enormous sum for that time.

=== From the stately home to the clinic ===
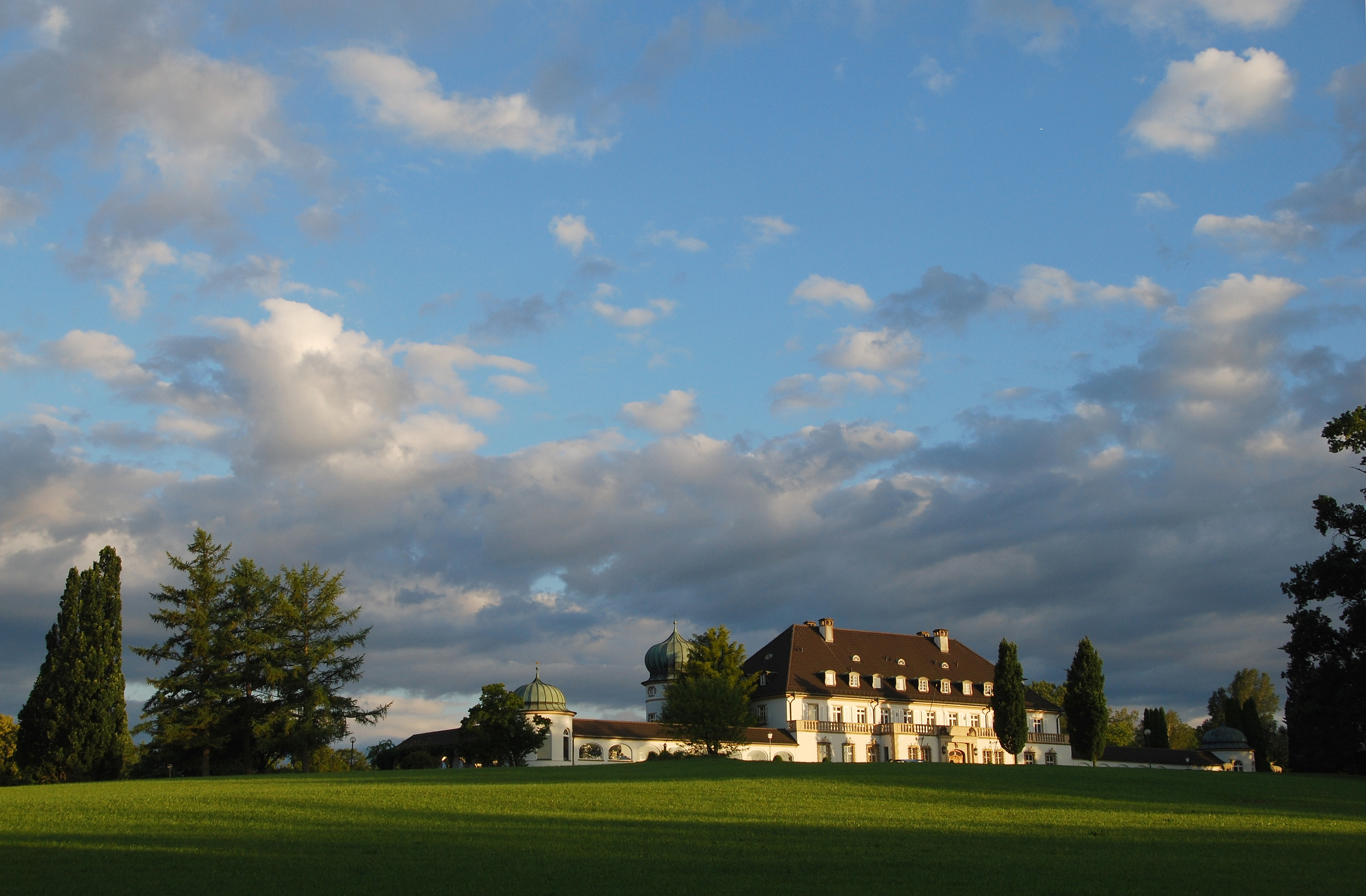
The entrance façade of Schloss Höhenried and its extensive grounds.

On 27 October 1955, the Landesversicherungsanstalt Oberbayern (Upper Bavarian State Insurance Institution) purchased Schloss Höhenried and its 88 hectares of land for 2.2 million Deutsche Marks. The Klinik Höhenried began operations in 1958 and 1967 respectively. The world of glamour returned to Schloss Höhenried, albeit with a different goal. Over the years, celebrities such as Ann Smyrner and Rudolf Schock were treated at the Cardiological rehabilitation clinic, which was later expanded to include psychosomatic and orthopedic indications.

The plans of the Landesversicherungsanstalt Oberbayern to run a health clinic in the castle and on the 88-hectare park grounds of Höhenried were nothing unusual for a Landesversicherungsanstalt (state insurance institution). Establishing and maintaining health clinics for their own insured members has been one of the responsibilities of the Landesversicherungsanstalten since the beginning of the Rentenversicherung (pension insurance). Schloss Höhenried, with its extensive grounds in this unique natural landscape, is ideal for this purpose.

"Schloss Höhenried is half Benedictine abbey, half Bavarian manor house, rising gracefully above the Starnberger See. The castle and its park form a jewel of architecture, interior decoration and garden design. Wilhelmina Busch used her fortune to realise a romantic dream. The welcoming arcades, the cloisters, the Renaissance hall, the Venetian and Chinese towers and the other rooms are filled with a kind of spiritual enchantment."

— Walther Kiaulehn, on the architecture of Schloss Höhenried in the Münchner Merkur of 20/21 August 1955

== Film location ==
Schloss Höhenried has served as a film location for several films and television series since the 1950s (dates refer to the first broadcast):

- Ein Stück vom Himmel (1957)
- Der Alte (1977)
- Raumpatrouille – Die phantastischen Abenteuer des Raumschiffes Orion (1966)
- Der Kommissar (1969)
- Die Rosenheim-Cops (2002)
- Schweinskopf al dente, part of the Eberhofer crime film series (2016)
- Gestern waren wir noch Kinder (2022)
