= Lake Starnberg =

Lake in Bavaria, Germany

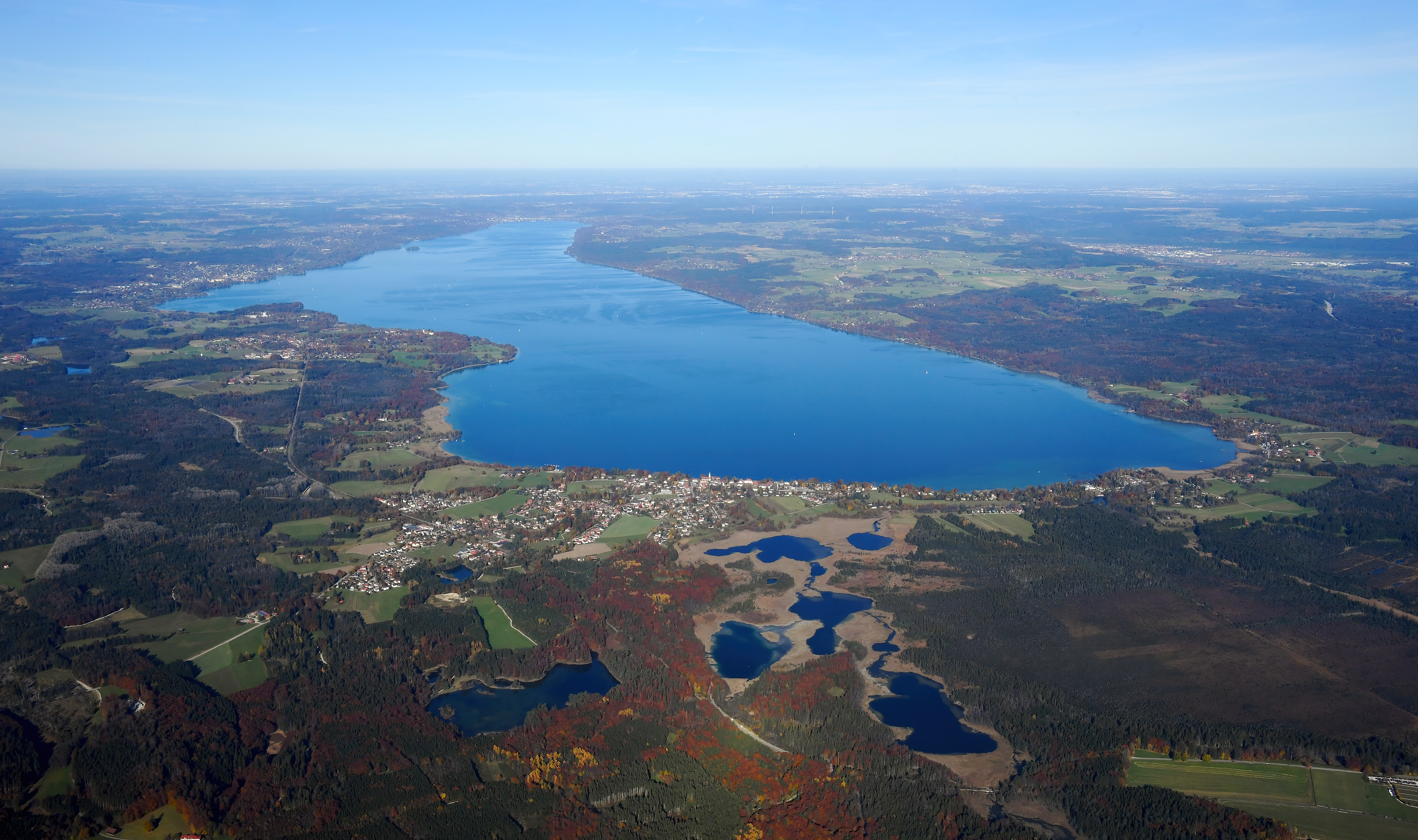
- Aerial view of Lake Starnberg from the south

- Location within Germany Location within Bavaria
- Location: Bavaria
- Coordinates: 47°54′14″N 11°18′26″E
- Type: Natural lake
- Primary inflows: Steinbach or Ostersee-Ach
- Primary outflows: Würm
- Catchment area: 314 km^{2} (121 sq mi)
- Basin countries: Germany
- Max. length: 19.45 km (12.09 mi)
- Surface area: 56.36 km^{2} (21.76 sq mi)
- Max. depth: 127.8 m (419 ft)
- Water volume: 2,998×10^{6} m^{3} (105.9×10^{9} cu ft)
- Residence time: 21 years
- Surface elevation: 596 m (1,955 ft)
- Islands: Roseninsel
- Settlements: Starnberg, Ammerland, Seeshaupt, Tutzing, Feldafing, Possenhofen

Ramsar Wetland
- Official name: Starnberger See
- Designated: 26 February 1976
- Reference no.: 94

Lake Starnberg or Starnberger See [ˈʃtaʁnbɛʁɡɐ ˌzeː] — called Lake Würm or Würmsee ([ˈvʏʁmˌzeː] until 1962 — is Germany's fifth-largest lake by area; however, because of its great depth, it is the second-largest body of fresh water. It and its surroundings lie in three different Bavarian districts, or Landkreise. The lake is property of the state and accordingly managed by the Bavarian Administration of State-Owned Palaces, Gardens and Lakes.

Located in southern Bavaria 25 kilometres (16 mi) southwest of Munich, Lake Starnberg is a popular recreation area for the city and, since 1976, one of the wetlands of international importance protected by the Ramsar Convention. The small town of Berg is famous as the site where King Ludwig II of Bavaria was found dead in the lake in 1886. Because of its associations with the Wittelsbach royal family, the lake is also known as Fürstensee (Prince's Lake). It is also mentioned in T. S. Eliot's poem The Waste Land.

== Overview ==
The lake, lying in a zungenbecken or glacial hollow, was created by ice age glaciers from the Alps, and extends 19.45 km (12.09 mi) from north to south and has a width of 3–5 km (1.9–3.1 mi) from east to west. It has a single small island, the Roseninsel, and a single outlet, the Würm river (because of this river the lake was called the Würmsee until 1962). Its major inflow comes from a small river called the Steinbach or Ostersee-Ach, which flows through a chain of small lakes to the south, the Osterseen. The lake's water is of excellent quality due to the introduction in the 1960s of a circular sewerage system which collects wastewater from the settlements around the lake and transports it to a treatment plant below the lake's outlet at Starnberg. Bronze fish-hooks and a dugout dating to the 9th or 8th century BCE have been discovered at the lake, and there are still some professional fishers, most of them continuing a family tradition.

Hikers and cyclists can circumnavigate the lake using a path approximately 49 kilometres (30 mi) long. Access to the lake shore is not possible everywhere, since it is mostly private property. Passenger ferries and excursion ships have operated on the lake since 1851. Today they are operated by the Bayerische Seenschifffahrt company, using modern diesel-engined ships.

== Etymology ==
The earliest surviving mention of the lake, as Uuirmseo, is in an 818 document referring to Holzhausen, now part of Münsing. This name became Wirmsee, already recorded during the reign of the Holy Roman Emperor Louis the Bavarian (1314–1347). This name is derived from the Wirm, now spelt Würm, the only river which flows out of the lake, at Starnberg; in the 19th century, the spellings were changed to Würm and Würmsee.

In the late 19th century, a railway connection between Munich and Starnberg made the lake an accessible destination for trips from the city. Trains departed from a wing of the Munich Central Station which was known as the 'Starnberg branch station' (Starnberger Flügelbahnhof) and the lake came increasingly to be known as Lake Starnberg; its name was finally officially changed in 1962.

== Settlements ==
Map of the lake

Clockwise from the north, the following settlements about the lake:

- Starnberg (North, Starnberg district)
- Berg (North East, Starnberg district): including Kempfenhausen, Berg and Leoni
- Münsing (South East, Bad Tölz-Wolfratshausen district): including Ammerland, Ambach, Pischetsrieder and St. Heinrich
- Seeshaupt (South, Weilheim-Schongau district): including Seeseiten
- Bernried (South West, Weilheim-Schongau district), the site of Schloss Höhenried
- Tutzing (West, Starnberg district): including Unterzeismering; Evangelische Akademie Tutzing on the lake
- Feldafing (North West, Starnberg district): including Garatshausen
- Pöcking (North West, Starnberg district): including Possenhofen and Niederpöcking

Off the western shore, south of Possenhofen, is the small Roseninsel (Rose Island), the site of a royal villa of Ludwig II.

== Panorama ==
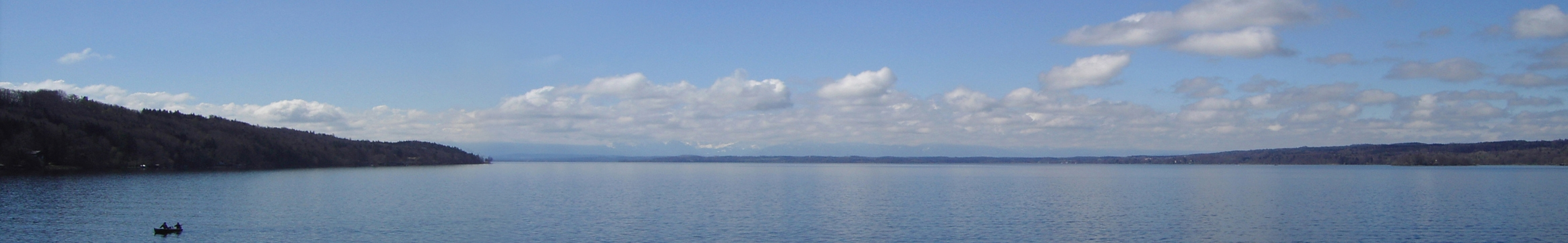
Panoramic view of Lake Starnberg looking south between Leoni and Possenhofen
