= Maurice Bavaud =

Swiss theology student and failed assassin (1916–1941)

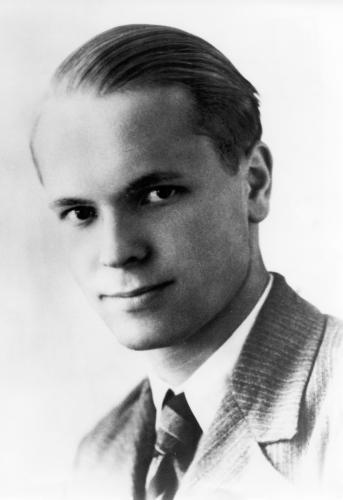
- Born: 15 January 1916; Neuchâtel, Switzerland
- Died: 14 May 1941 (aged 25); Plötzensee Prison, Berlin, Nazi Germany
- Cause of death: Execution by guillotine

Maurice Bavaud (French pronunciation: [mɔ.ʁis bavo]) (15 January 1916 – 14 May 1941) was a Swiss theology student who attempted to assassinate Adolf Hitler in 1938.

== Background ==
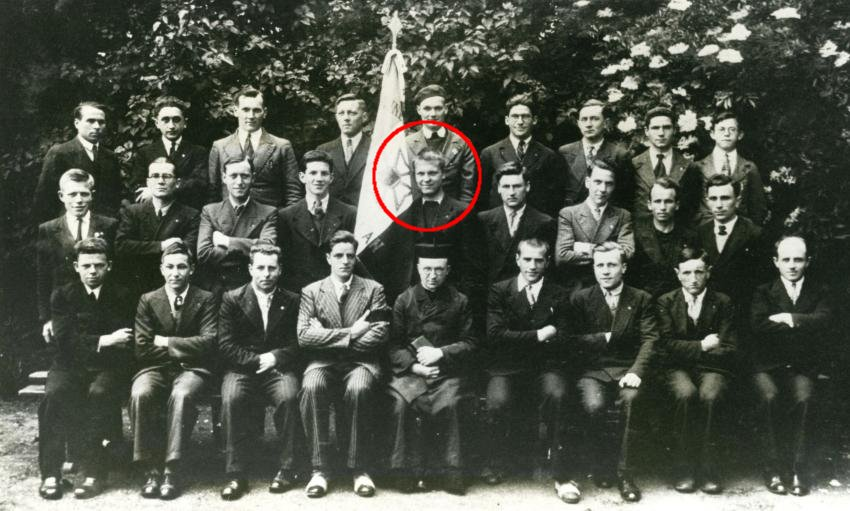
School photo of Maurice Bavaud (in red circle)

Maurice Bavaud was born on 15 January 1916 in Neuchâtel to Alfred Bavaud, a postal worker, and Helène Steiner. He attended a Lasallian Brothers school and undertook an apprenticeship in technical drawing before moving to Saint-Brieuc, Brittany, to study at the Saint-Ilan seminary to become a missionary. In France, he became a member of the anticommunist group Compagnie du Mystère. Marcel Gerbohay, the group's leader, was a self-proclaimed member of the House of Romanov and significantly influenced Bavaud. He persuaded Bavaud that if communism were abolished, Russia would return to Romanov rule, with Gerbohay himself as the leader. Bavaud, convinced by Gerbohay's remarks, became obsessed with the idea that killing Hitler would advance the plan, and he ultimately decided to carry out the assassination himself.

== Attempts ==
On 9 October 1938, Bavaud left France to travel to Baden-Baden, then on to Basel, where he bought a Schmeisser 6.35 mm (.25 ACP) semi-automatic pistol. In Berlin, a policeman, Karl Deckert, overheard Bavaud saying that he wanted to meet Hitler personally. Deckert advised Bavaud that a private audience could be arranged if Bavaud could obtain a letter of introduction from a suitable foreign VIP. Deckert told him to travel to Munich for the anniversary of the 1923 "Beer Hall Putsch", which Hitler attended every year. Bavaud followed those instructions by buying a ticket for a seat on the reviewing stand by posing as a Swiss reporter, intending to shoot Hitler as he passed during the parade. Bavaud abandoned this attempt when, on November 9, Hitler was out of range. As he marched past, he was surrounded by Sturmabteilung troops, and Bavaud's view was blocked by surrounding spectators giving the Nazi salute.

Bavaud next purchased expensive stationery and forged a letter of introduction in the name of the French nationalist leader Pierre Taittinger, which claimed that Bavaud had a second letter for Hitler's eyes only. He travelled to Berchtesgaden in the belief that Hitler had returned there, only to find that Hitler was still in Munich. When Bavaud returned to Munich, he discovered that Hitler was just leaving for Berchtesgaden.

== Arrest and trial ==
Having exhausted his money, Bavaud stowed away on a train to Paris, but was detained while on his way for travelling without a ticket and, as a foreigner, was turned over to the Gestapo. He was interrogated and admitted his plans to assassinate Hitler.

After being taken to Berlin, Bavaud was tried by the Volksgerichtshof on 18 December 1939, where he declared he had acted alone, naming as his motives that he considered Hitler a threat to humanity, to Swiss independence, and to Catholicism in Germany. Swiss diplomacy made no effort to save Bavaud. Hans Frölicher, the Swiss ambassador to Germany, even publicly condemned Bavaud's assassination attempt. An offer from the Germans to exchange Bavaud for a German spy was turned down, and Bavaud was sentenced to death. He was executed by guillotine in the Berlin-Plötzensee Prison on the morning of 14 May 1941.

== Legacy ==
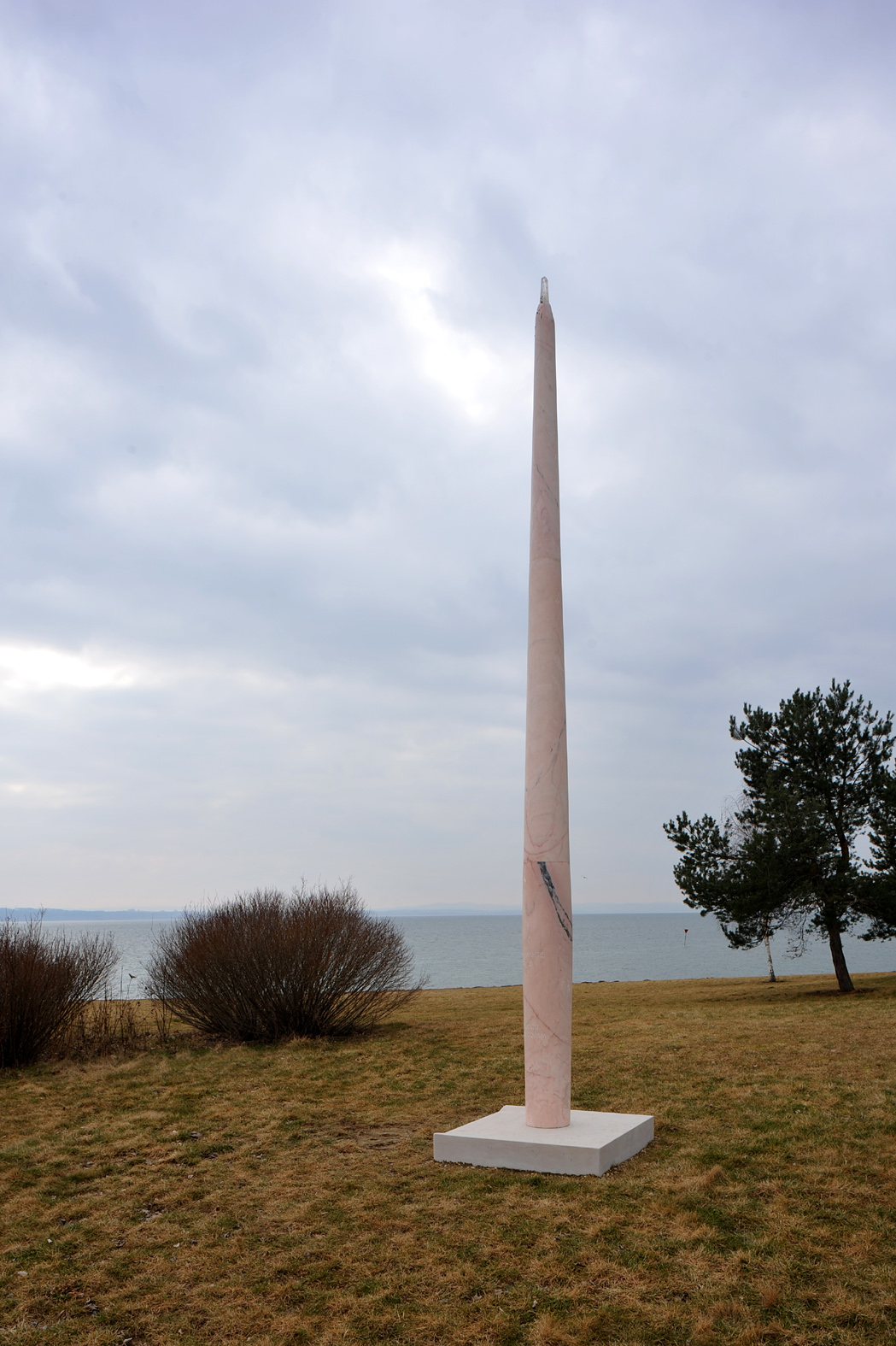
Stele dedicated to Maurice Bavaud in Hauterive, Switzerland

Bavaud's father Alfred attempted to rehabilitate his son's name and reputation, resulting in a court decision on December 12, 1955 reverting the death sentence but posthumously condemning Bavaud to a five-year sentence, arguing that Hitler's life was protected by law just as any other life. A second verdict of 1956 reverted the prison sentence and Germany paid Bavaud's family the sum of CHF 40,000 in reparation.

In 1976, German playwright Rolf Hochhuth celebrated Bavaud as a "new William Tell", while in 1980 historian Klaus Urner relativized Hochhuth's heroic picture, analyzing psychological aspects of Bavaud's motivation. In 1989 and again in 1998, the Swiss Federal Council admitted that the Swiss authorities did not make a sufficient effort to save Bavaud. Finally, in 2008, the Swiss government honored the life and effort of Bavaud. In 2011, a small monument in his honor was erected in Hauterive near Neuchâtel.

== In popular media ==
Thomas Hürlimann's play Der Gesandte (1991) explores the homecoming of the Swiss Ambassador Hans Frölicher after the fall of the Nazi regime. It romanticises him being haunted by the thought of his betrayal of Maurice Bavaud. The play was filmed by Laurent Nègre in 2023 as A Forgotten Man.

== See also ==
- List of assassination attempts on Adolf Hitler
