= Hans Frölicher =

Swiss envoy (1887–1961)

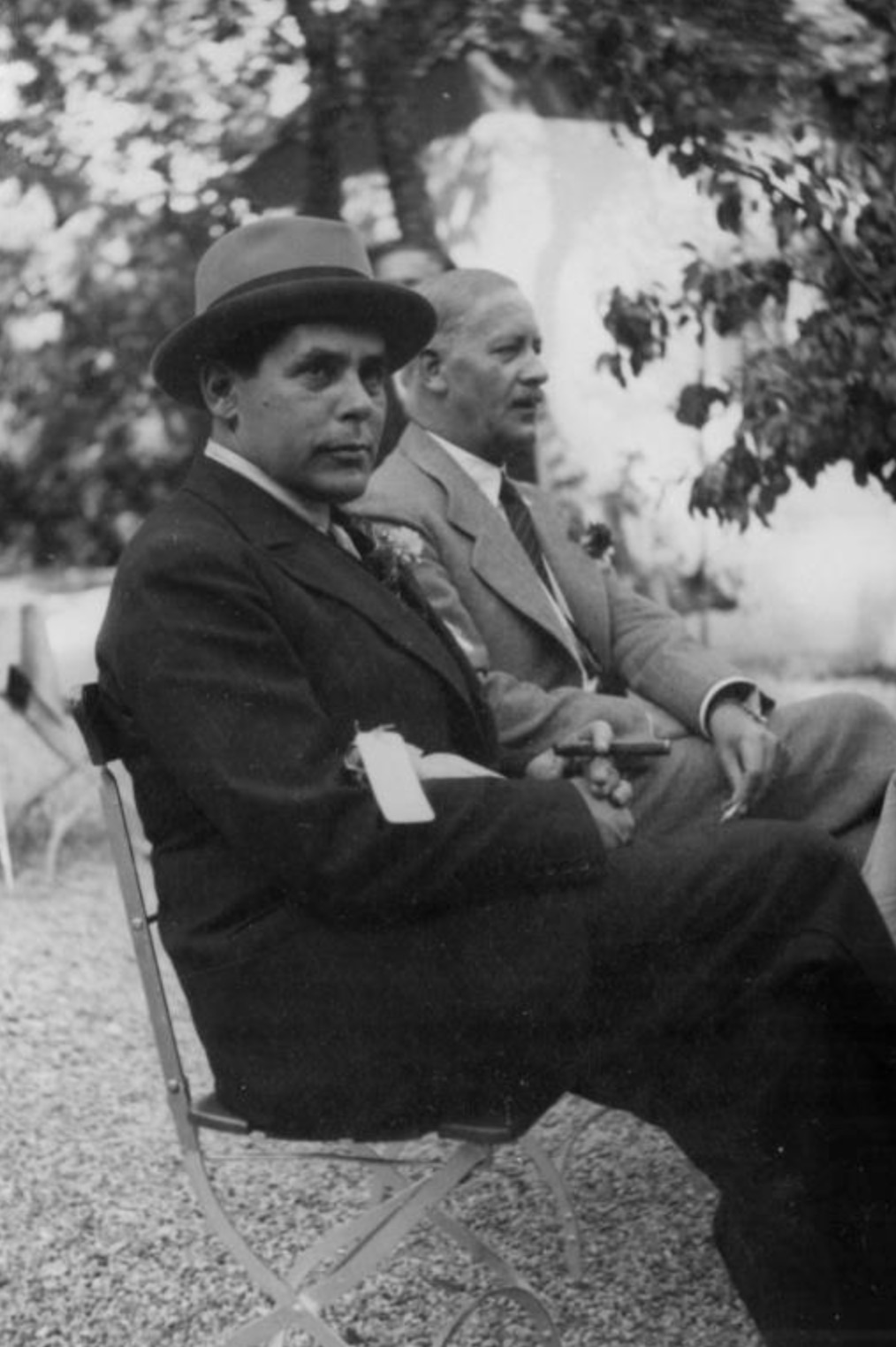
Minister Hans Frölicher, c. 1937. When the Battle of Berlin intensified significantly in March 1945, he had part of the Swiss Legation relocated to Schloss Höhenried.

Hans Frölicher (Note: Alternatively transliterated as Fröhlicher or Froellicher) (3 December 1887 – 30 January 1961) was the Envoy of the Swiss Confederation to the German Reich during World War II. He remains controversial in Switzerland due to his sympathies for the Third Reich while envoy in Berlin.

== Envoy to the German Reich ==
Frölicher replaced Paul Dinichert, who had served as envoy to the German Reich between 1932 and 1938. Frölicher was received by Adolf Hitler as envoy to the German Reich at a ceremony on June 9, 1938. Early in his tenure, Frölicher was able to delay relocating the Swiss Legation, which had been required to fulfill Albert Speer's vision of Germania. Beginning in 1938, Frölicher was involved in negotiations between the governments of the German Reich and Switzerland aimed at reducing the number of Jews seeking refuge in Switzerland.

In 1939, a Swiss theology student named Maurice Bavaud attempted to assassinate Adolf Hitler. Although Bavaud was facing execution, Fröhlicher refused to intervene, going so far as to decline an offer to exchange Bavaud for captured Gestapo spies imprisoned in Switzerland. Instead, he condemned Bavaud for his actions. Frölicher was also an advocate of Nazi sympathizer Eugen Bircher's efforts to send a volunteer medical mission to the Eastern Front to aid the Germans.

Frölicher remained the Swiss envoy to the German Reich until 1945.

== Post-diplomatic service ==
A memoir of Frölicher's was privately published in 1962, entitled Meine Aufgabe in Berlin (My Task in Berlin).

== In Media ==
The main character of Thomas Hürlimann's play "Der Gesandte" (the envoy), Heinrich Zwygart, is based on Frölicher, focusing on his reception in Switzerland in 1945. This play was turned into a movie by Laurent Nègre in 2023 entitled "A Forgotten Man".
