= Victor Debeney =

French Army general

Marie Cyrille Victor Debeney (26 April 1891 – 1 March 1956) was a French Army general. He was the head of the secretariat of Philippe Pétain from August 1944 to April 1945.

== Biography ==
Born in Bourg-en-Bresse (Ain), Victor Debeney was the son of General Marie-Eugène Debeney (1856–1943). Voluntarily enlisting in the French Army in 1910, he was made a corporal the following year, then was admitted to Saint-Cyr, graduating as sub-lieutenant in July 1913 and assigned to the 25e bataillon de chasseurs. He was seriously wounded during the First World War on 23 September 1914, when he lost an arm.

At the beginning of the Second World War, he was, with the rank of colonel, commander of the 129e régiment d'infanterie. Promoted to général de brigade, he took command on 1 June 1940 of the la 238e division d'infanterie légère which had been constituted within the 6e armée de réserve and stationed near Arc-en-Barrois. The unit was dissolved at the end of June 1940.

He was director of the Services de l'armistice, from 16 April 1943 to 18 August 1944, within the Vichy government, then head of the general secretariat of Philippe Pétain, succeeding Commander Tracou. He accompanied Pétain a few days later to Sigmaringen in Germany, then returned to France with him on 26 April 1945, and was imprisoned in Fresnes Prison. He was one of the 18 superior officers to testify in defence of Pétain at his trial in August 1945. Indicted for crimes against the State security in front of the High Court of Justice, the case was dismissed because of his Résistance activities. He was stricken from the Army lists on 8 March 1946.

He died at his home on Avenue du Docteur-Brouardel in the 7e arrondissement of Paris in March 1956, aged 64.

== Honours ==
- Commandeur of the Légion d'honneur (31 December 1939).
- Croix de guerre 1914–1918
