= Bernried am Starnberger See =

Bernried
- Municipality
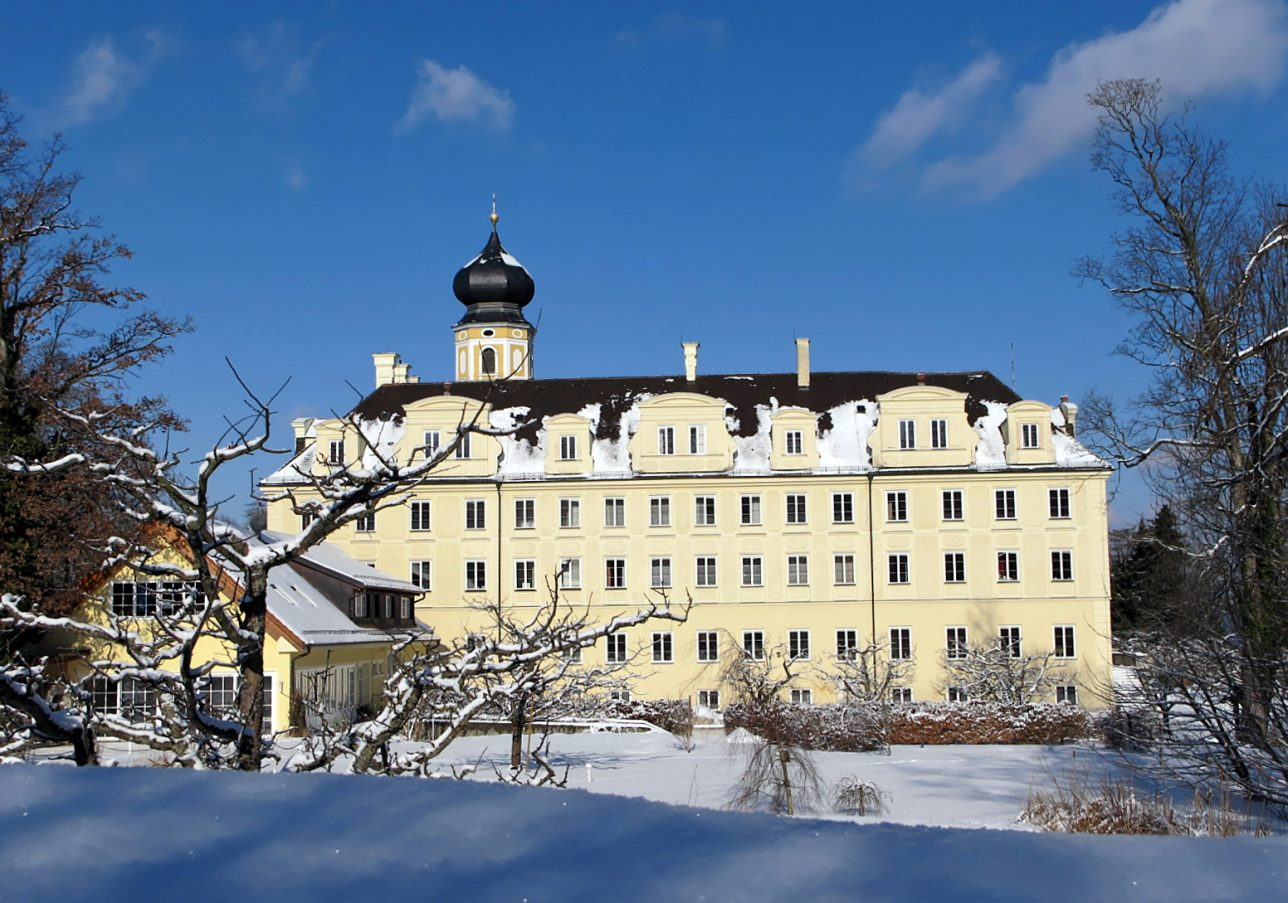
- Bernried Castle (former Abbey)

- Coat of arms

- Location of Bernried within Weilheim-Schongau district
- Interactive map of Bernried
- Location within Germany Location within Bavaria
- Coordinates: 47°51′56″N 11°17′32″E
- Country: Germany
- State: Bavaria
- Admin. region: Upper Bavaria
- District: Weilheim-Schongau

Government
  - Mayor (2020–26): Georg Malterer

Area
  - Total: 13.79 km^{2} (5.32 sq mi)
- Elevation: 600 m (2,000 ft)

Population (2025-12-31)
  - Total: 2,406
  - Density: 174.5/km^{2} (451.9/sq mi)
- Time zone: UTC+01:00 (CET)
  - Summer (DST): UTC+02:00 (CEST)
- Postal codes: 82347
- Dialling codes: 08158
- Vehicle registration: WM
- Website: www.bernried.de

Bernried am Starnberger See is a municipality in the Weilheim-Schongau district, in Bavaria, Germany. It lies on the shore of Starnberger See.

== Gallery ==
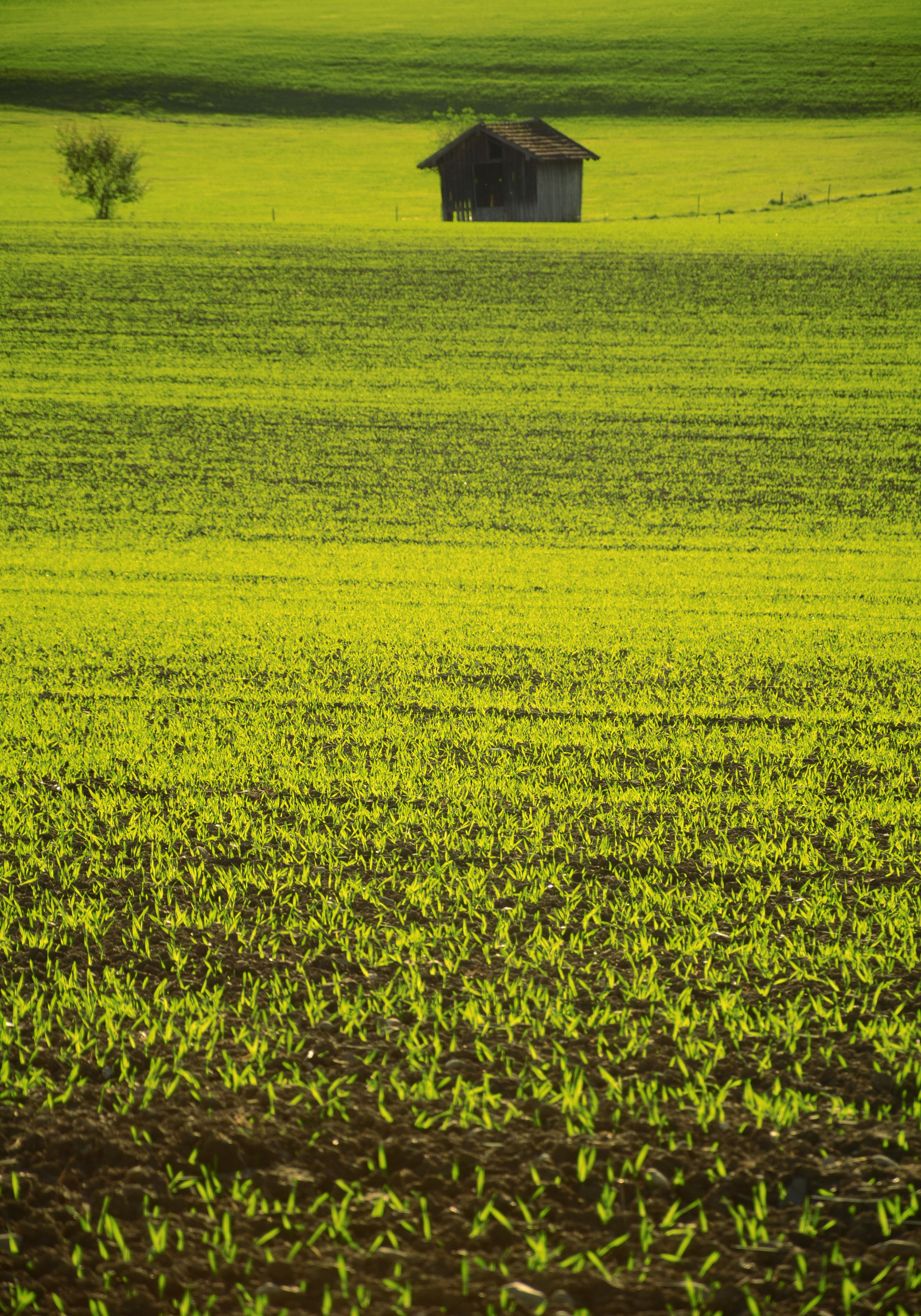
Green farmland around Stamberger See
