= Livia (disambiguation) =

Livia, also known as Livia Drusilla and Julia Augusta, is a Roman Empress and the wife of Augustus.

Livia may also refer to:

- Livia (given name), a list of people and fictional characters
- Livia gens, an ancient Roman family
- Anna Livia (author) (1955–2007), lesbian feminist author and linguist
- Livia (fungus), a genus of fungi in the order Helotiales
- Livia (insect), a genus of insects in the family Liviidae
- Livia (novel), by Lawrence Durrell
- Livia, a wearable device for menstrual pain relief created by iPulse Medical

== See also ==
- Llívia, a town in Catalonia, Spain (an enclave in France)
