= François de Ziegler =

Swiss lawyer and diplomat

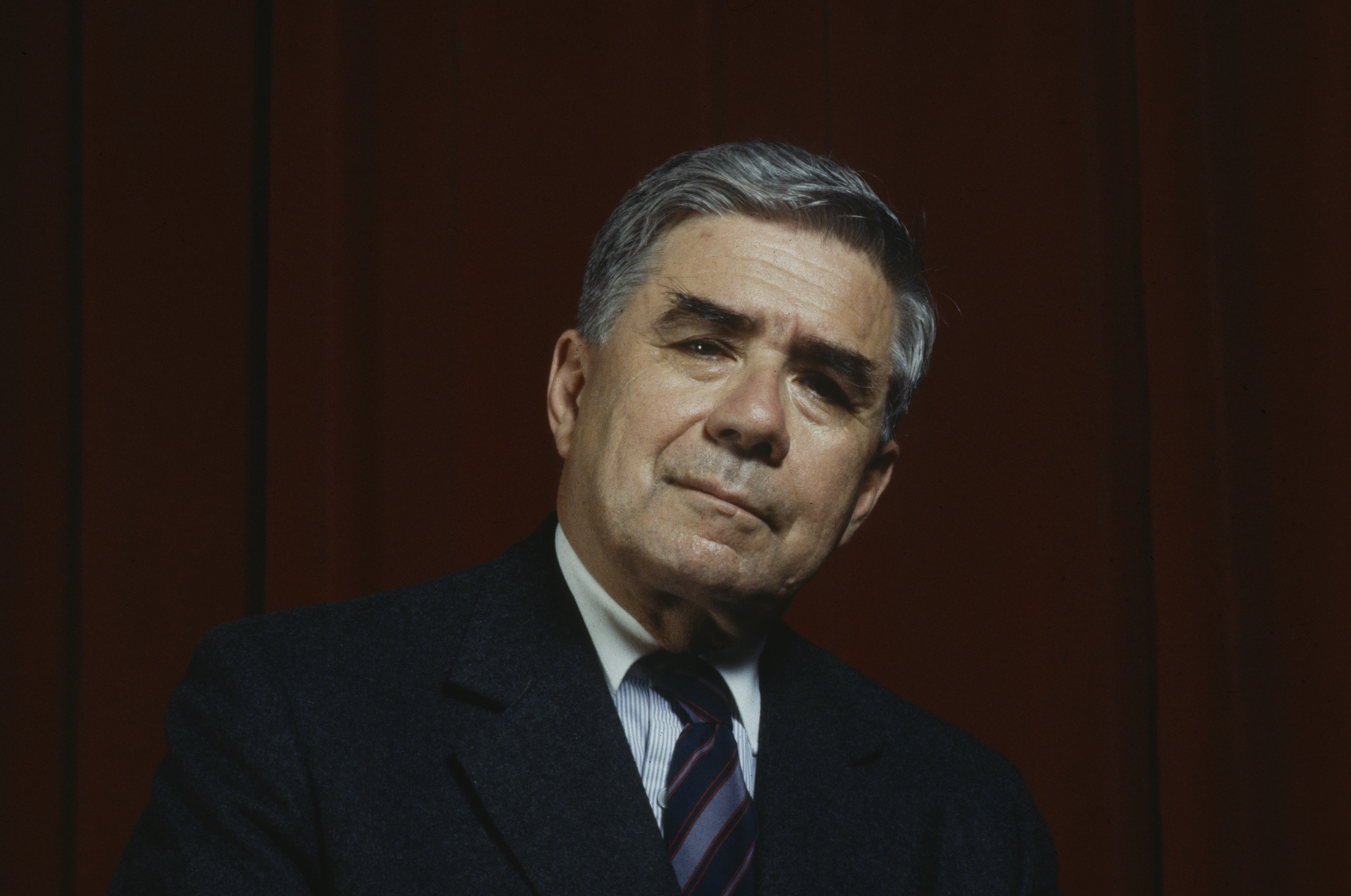
- Ambassador François de Ziegler in 1984. He was the last ambassador of the era of the gentlemen diplomats in Paris.
- Born: 7 February 1922; Plainpalais, Switzerland
- Died: 19 March 2006 (aged 84); Geneva, Switzerland
- Occupation: Diplomat
- Spouse: Sabine Ranque
- Parent(s): Henri de Ziegler (1885–1970) and Cécile Henriette Bénédicte, née Carry

François de Ziegler (1922–2006) was a Swiss lawyer, diplomat and Ambassador of the Swiss Confederation to France. His family originated from Geneva and Schaffhausen.

== Education and career ==
After studying law in Geneva, François de Ziegler joined the Federal Political Department (FPD) in 1945. In the same year, the young diplomat was posted to Marseille, where his wife also came from. In 1946, he returned to Bern, where he joined the FPD in a junior position. In 1948, he was posted to Nice and two years later to Paris. In 1955, François de Ziegler was back in Bern at the FPD, where he first joined the legal department and then the political department. In 1958, he became an embassy secretary and the deputy head of mission in Moscow. He subsequently held the same position in Belgrade. In 1961, he was posted to Cairo, where he was promoted to an embassy counsellor in 1963. In 1964, he was posted to New York as deputy of the Swiss Observer at the United Nations.

=== Back to France: Maintaining contact with the Quai d'Orsay ===
Back in Europe, François de Ziegler was appointed cultural attaché at the embassy and simultaneously served as delegate to UNESCO in Paris in 1968. Two years later, he became deputy head of mission with the title of minister. The head of mission in Paris at the time was Ambassador Pierre Dupont (1912–1993), who had succeeded Agostino Giorgio Soldati, who had died in office in 1966. At that time, however, it was above all François de Ziegler who had excellent contacts with the Quai d'Orsay and wrote the relevant reports for the FPD. In this respect, he followed in the footsteps of Walter Stucki and Agostino Giorgio Soldati, who also enjoyed high esteem in French society.

=== Conference on Security and Co-operation in Europe ===
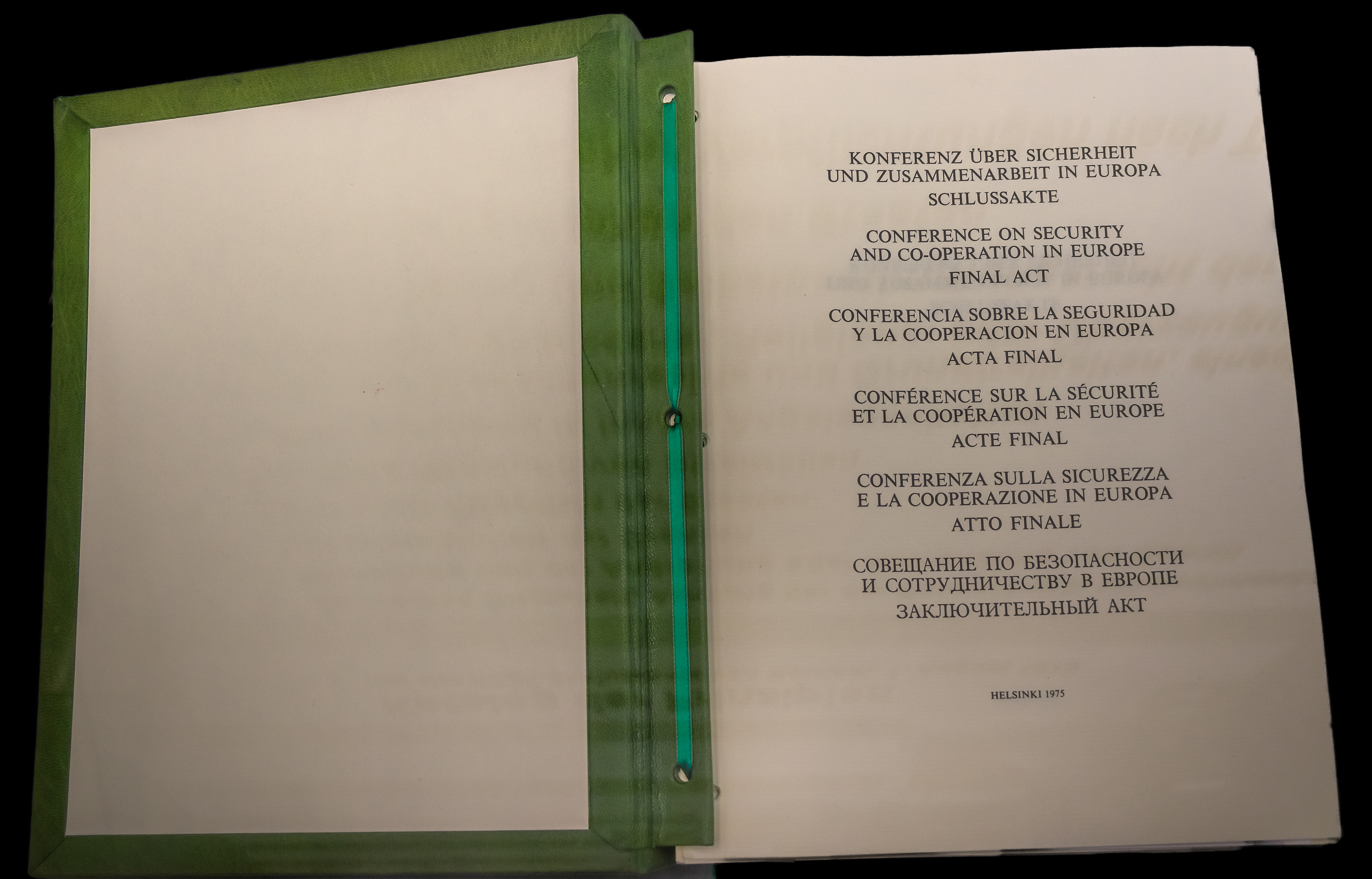
The Helsinki Accords, the final act of the CSCE, which was signed in Helsinki in 1975. The Swiss Confederation was represented by President Pierre Graber.

From 1971 to 1973, an intensive exchange of correspondence took place between the Federal Political Department (FPD) and various Swiss embassies in Europe on the subject of a more active neutrality policy within the Conference on Security and Co-operation in Europe (CSCE). The embassy in Paris was very active in this regard. It was primarily François de Ziegler, deputy of Ambassador Pierre Dupont, who worked on this issue in close contact with the Quai d'Orsay. He had built close personal relationships with his French colleagues Claude Arnaud (1919–1999), deputy political director, and Jacques Andreani. Accordingly, the cooperation between François de Ziegler and his French counterparts went beyond a simple exchange of information. They trusted each other.

In 1971, France assured Switzerland that it would be interested in hosting a permanent organisation that might emerge from the CSCE negotiations in Geneva. In return, France promised Switzerland that it would advocate for the Geneva headquarters of the CSCE within the group of European Economic Community (EEC) countries and would try to persuade all EEC countries to commit to this course. But the intensive and trust-based relationship with the Quai d'Orsay only lasted as long as François de Ziegler maintained it. After his return to Bern, the embassy's influence at the Quai d'Orsay declined significantly.

=== Ambassador to France ===
In 1973, François de Ziegler returned to Bern to the FPD and was appointed deputy director of the Political Directorate and head of the Political Secretariat with the rank of ambassador. Three years later, he was promoted to head of the Directorate for International Organisations. In 1977, François de Ziegler succeeded Pierre Dupont as ambassador to France and moved into the Hôtel de Besenval. The seamless transition from Pierre Dupont to Françoise de Ziegler, each of whom served ten years as ambassador to France, is unique. Both enjoyed high esteem with the French government, which certainly explains their unusually long terms in office there. Françoise de Ziegler was also a member of the Institut de France, which reflects his excellent integration into the French high society.
