= Livia (given name) =

Livia was the wife of Augustus and the most powerful woman in the early Roman Empire. Livia is a female name of Latin origin, meaning "blue," or of Hebrew origin meaning "garland." From Roman times, this was the female derivative of the family name Livius. Livia is a common feminine given name in countries such as Brazil, Italy, Spain, Argentina, Uruguay, Cuba, France, Romania and Hungary. A variation spelled Livija is also used in Lithuania and Latvia.

Livia was a literary favorite from the sixteenth century, appearing in the plays of John Fletcher and Thomas Middleton, and playing a minor role in Romeo and Juliet. Anna Livia Plurabelle is the name of a character in James Joyce's Finnegans Wake.

== People ==
=== Ancient world ===
- Livia (mother of Cato) (c. 120 BC – c. 92 BC), mother of Cato the Younger and grandmother of Marcus Iunius Brutus the Younger
- Livia Ocellina (fl. 1st century BC), second wife of the Roman Emperor Galba’s father
- Livia Orestilla, Roman empress (in 37 or 38) of Emperor Caligula
- Livia Medullina Camilla (fl. 1st century), second fiancee of the future emperor Claudius

=== Other ===
- Livia Leu Agosti (born 1961), Swiss diplomat
- Livia Altmann (born 1994), Swiss ice hockey player
- Lívia Andrade (born 1983), Brazilian actress and TV presenter
- Livia Brito (born 1986), Cuban-Mexican actress
- Līvija Endzelīna (1927–2008), Latvian painter
- Livia Frege (1818–1891), German soprano singer
- Livia Giuggioli (born 1969), Italian film producer
- Lívia Járóka (born 1974), Hungarian politician
- Livia Kaiser (born 2004), Swiss figure skater
- Livia Klausová (born 1943), Czech economist
- Livia Lancelot (born 1988), French motocross racer
- Livia Millhagen (born 1973), Swedish actress
- Lívia Mossóczy (1936–2017), Hungarian table tennis player
- Livia Peng (born 2002), Swiss footballer
- Livia Pirocchi Tonolli (1909–1985), Italian freshwater biologist
- Lívia Renata Souza (born 1991), Brazilian MMA artist
- Lívia Rév (1916–2018), Hungarian musician
- Lívia Rusz (1930–2020), Romanian-Hungarian graphic artist
- Livia Turco (born 1955), Italian politician
- Livia Veloz (1892–1980), Dominican writer and feminist activist
- Livia Zita (born 1984), Hungarian graphic designer and singer, and the wife of King Diamond
- Livia d'Arco (c. 1565–1611), Italian singer

== Fictional characters ==
- Livia Beale, on the television drama Journeyman
- Livia Frye, on the soap opera All My Children
- Livia Soprano, on the television series The Sopranos
- Livia (see Eve (Xena)), a name adopted by a character in the television action series Xena: Warrior Princess
- Livia Blackthorn, in Cassandra Clare's Shadowhunter Chronicles
- Livia Burlando, on the television series ‘’Inspector Montalbano’’

== See also ==
- Livia (disambiguation)
- Livilla, Roman noblewoman
