= List of ambassadors of Switzerland to France =

Embassy of the Swiss Confederation in France
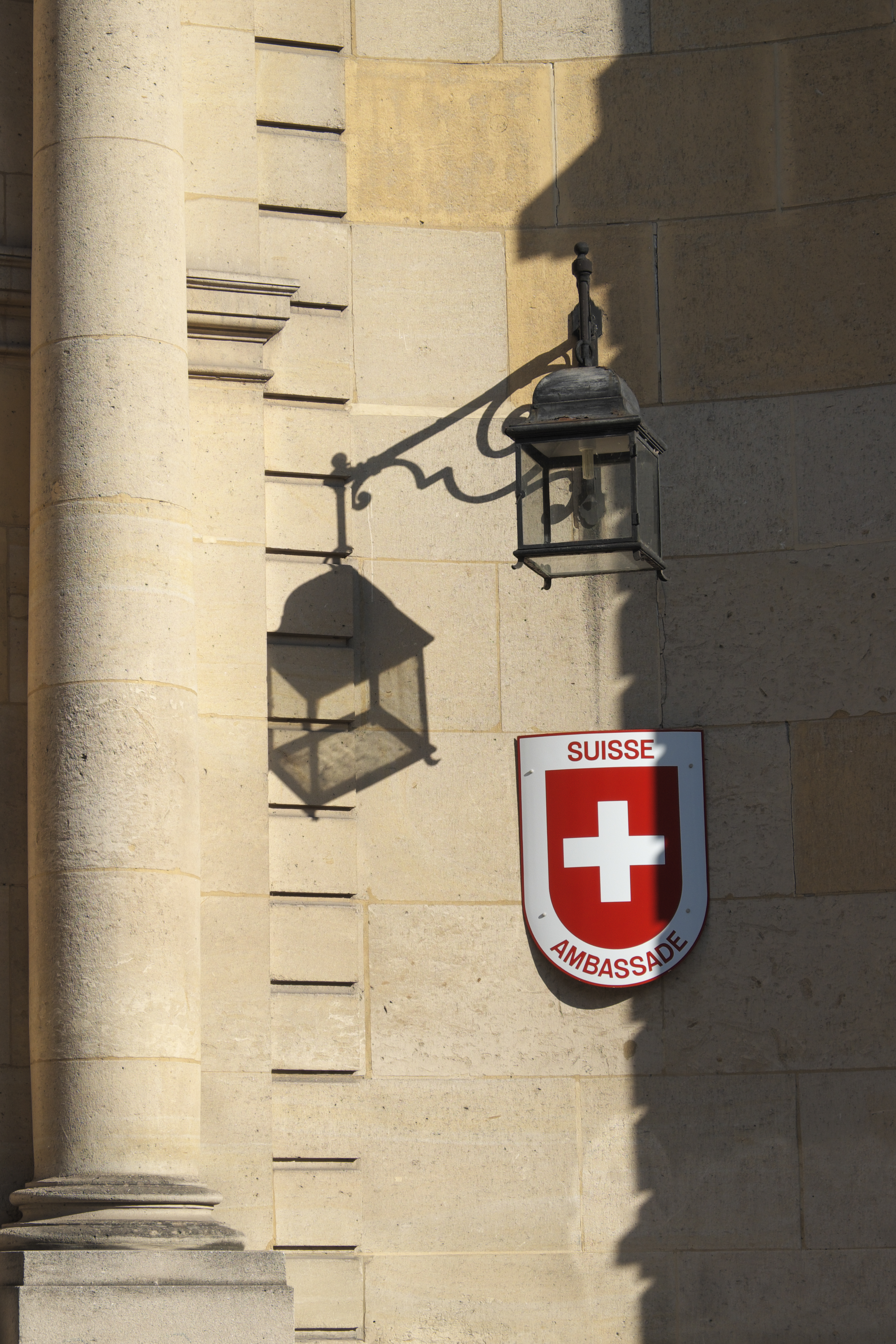
- Entrance gate of the Hôtel de Besenval, the Embassy of the Swiss Confederation and the residence of the Swiss ambassador to France

General information
- Location: 142 Rue de Grenelle, Paris, France

The Ambassador of Switzerland to France is the representative of the Government of Switzerland in France and thus responsible for maintaining diplomatic relations between Switzerland and France.

== First permanent Swiss diplomatic representation in France ==
The worldwide first ever permanent Swiss diplomatic representation was opened in Paris in April 1798, at the time of the Helvetic Republic. On 28 April 1798, the Helvetic Directorate officially appointed the first envoy, Peter Josef Zeltner. However, Zeltner's posting to Paris had already taken place the previous day; thus, at the time of his appointment, he was already en route to Paris. Today the Embassy of the Swiss Confederation as well as the residence of the Swiss ambassador are housed in the Hôtel de Besenval in Paris.

=== The early years: The era of the gentlemen diplomats ===
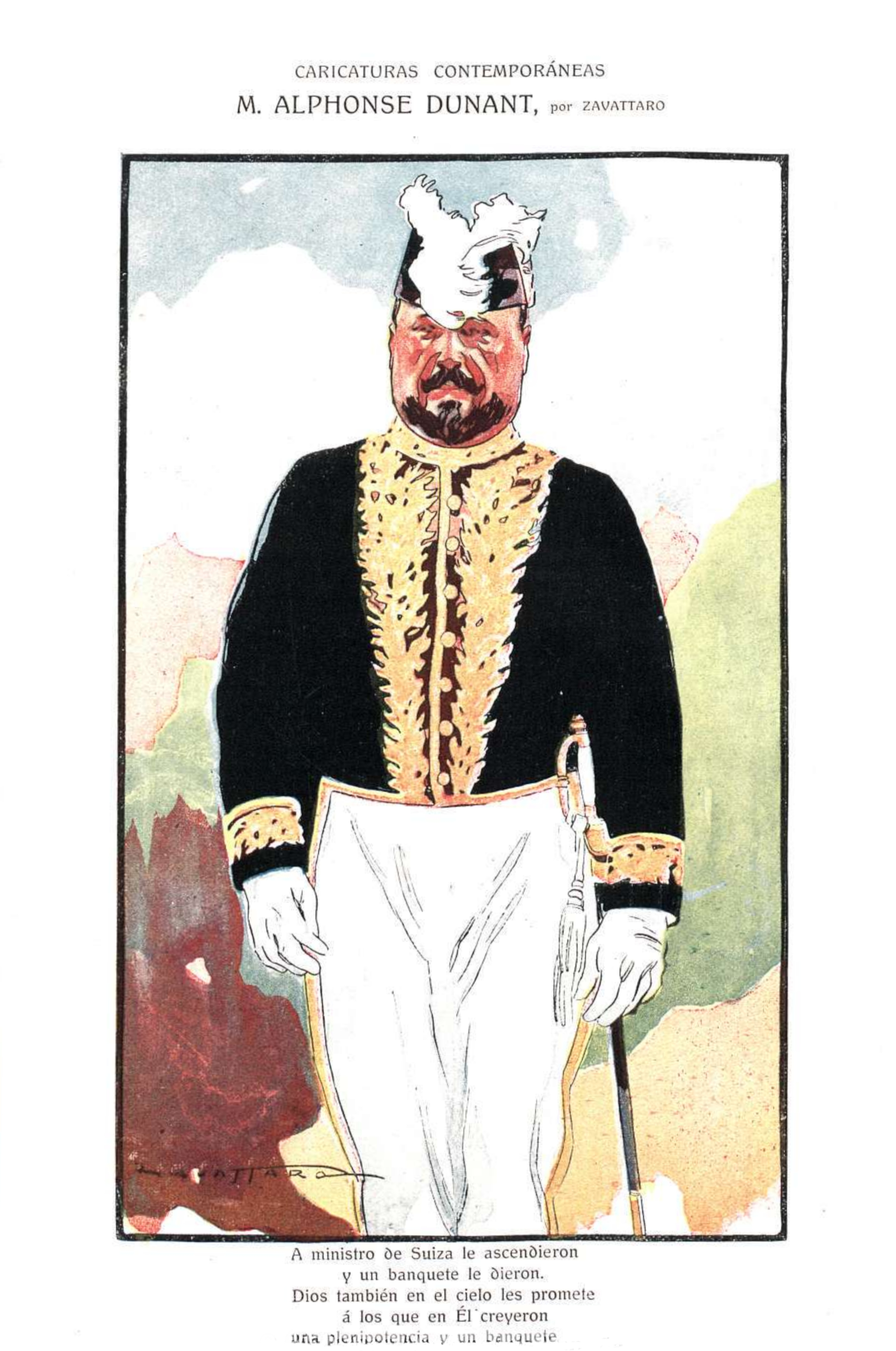
Caricature of Alphonse Dunant in his diplomatic uniform, the Alpine rose tailcoat. The tailcoat is embroidered in gold with alpine roses and edelweiss, the Swiss national flowers. The diplomatic uniform fell out of fashion after the democratisation of the Swiss diplomatic service in the late 1950s, when the era of the gentlemen diplomats came to an end. However, the abolition of the uniform was also due to cost reasons, as embroidery with real gold threads was becoming increasingly expensive. In 1987, the Association for the reintroduction of the diplomatic uniform was founded during the tenure of State Secretary Franz Blankart (1936–2021), but without success. The diplomatic uniform was not reintroduced in Switzerland. Drawing by Mario Zavattaro (1876–1932).

The beginnings of Swiss professional diplomacy in the last quarter of the 19th century were modest and accompanied by a certain skepticism. The focus of criticism was the associated costs. However, this attitude was not new. As early as 1731, the question of costs meant that the idea of establishing a permanent Swiss mission in Paris was not realised.

==== The noble and the wealthy ====
The question of costs came into focus again almost 150 years later when the first steps towards professionalising the diplomatic service were taken, which was mainly due to the initiative of Federal Councillor Numa Droz. The issue of costs was also reflected in the requirements for recruiting diplomats. Anyone interested in becoming a diplomat in the early years was advised that – in addition to a degree in law, knowledge of modern history as well as language skills in the Swiss national languages (French and German spoken and written, knowledge of Italian advantageous) and English (advantageous) – they should have above all one thing at their disposal: Their own assets.

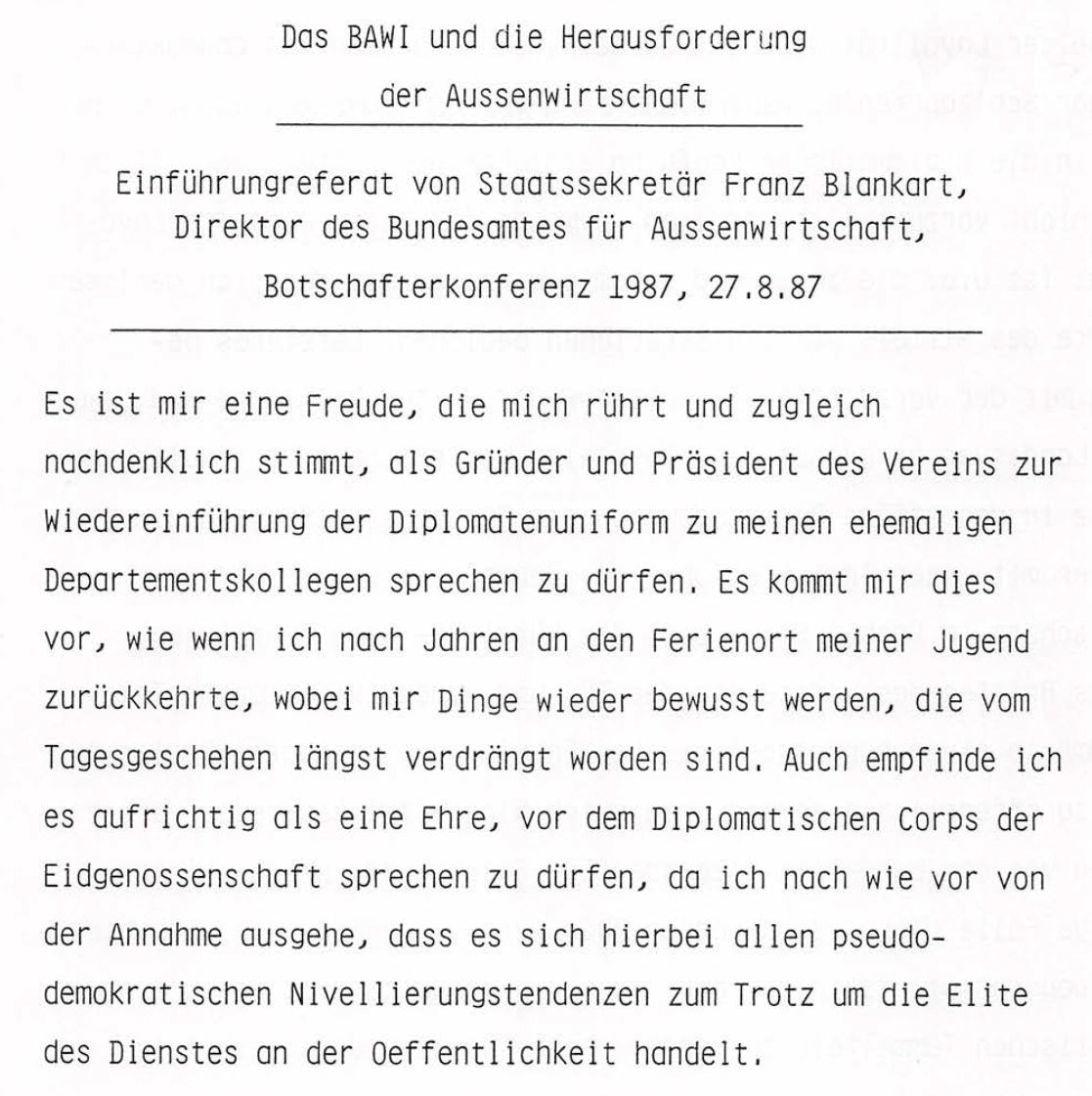
Excerpt from the speech by State Secretary Franz Blankart (1936–2021) at the Swiss Ambassadors' Conference in 1987, where he also introduces himself as the founder and president of the Association for the reintroduction of the diplomatic uniform. At the same time, he explains that he still considers the members of the diplomatic corps to be the elite of the civil service.

The Swiss Confederation expressly pointed out that a diplomat's salary – even if he is head of mission – will not be enough to cover his living costs. Furthermore, until the regulations for the diplomatic service were revised in 1904, it was even demanded that young gentlemen who wished to become diplomats had to be prepared to serve for two to three years without any financial compensation. These years were essentially regarded as unpaid apprenticeship years. Accordingly, the first Swiss diplomats came from wealthy, mostly industrial and patrician families, who viewed their profession as an appointment rather than a job, in the sense of an honorary post. Hence, the young diplomats were effectively co-opted by the old boy network, which also helps explain the diplomatic corps' once-elite reputation. This only changed with the adjustment of salaries and the introduction of an admission competition, the concours diplomatique, which was developed in 1955 under the leadership of Walter Stucki and finally introduced in 1956. This process is also known as the democratisation of the diplomatic service. It was the beginning of the end of the era of the gentlemen diplomats.

"It is true that, until relatively recently, Swiss diplomacy was primarily the preserve of members of noble and wealthy families."

— Walter Stucki

==== The final years of the gentlemen diplomats and the emergence of a new era of ministerial diplomacy ====
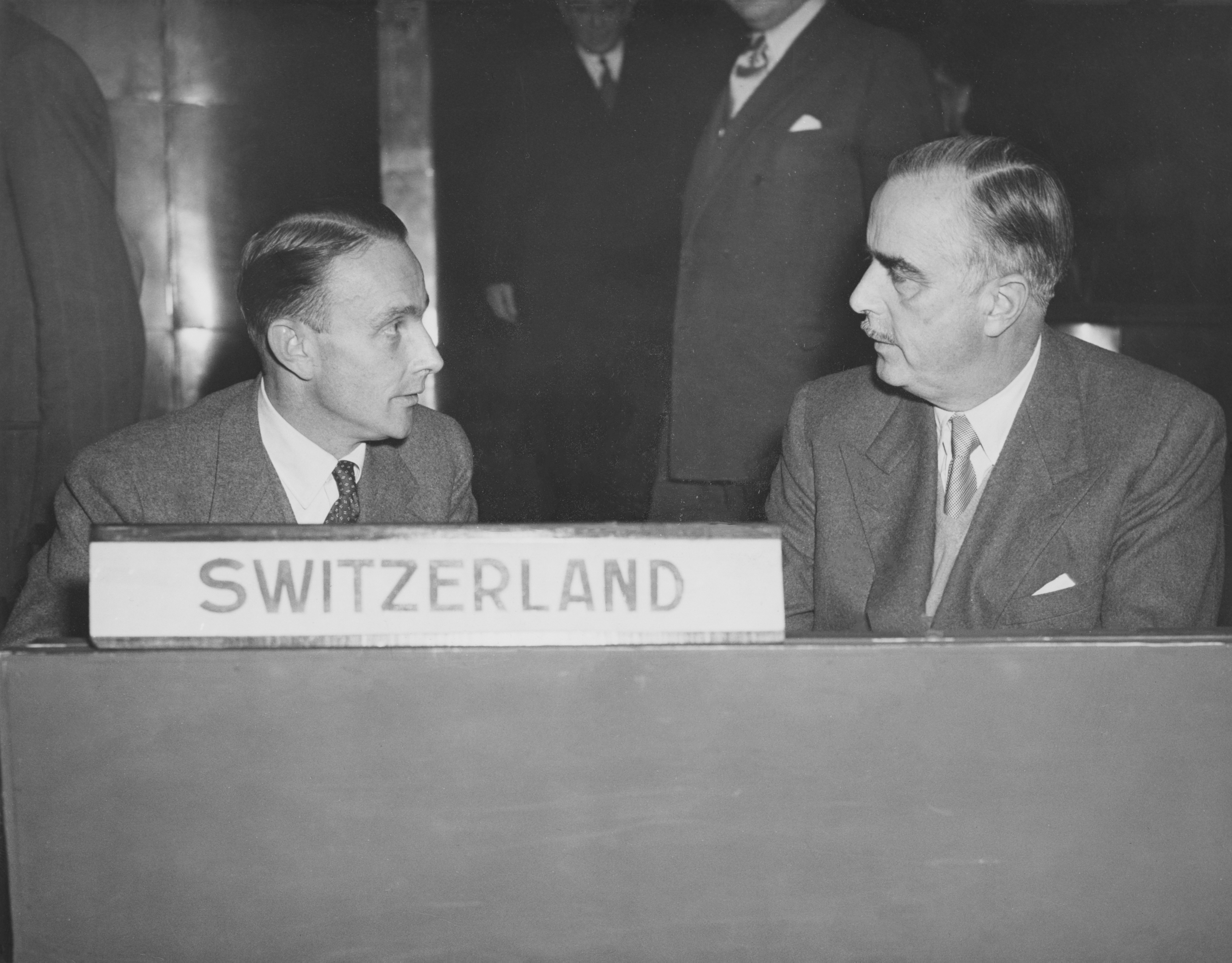
Considered the gentleman diplomat par excellence: Minister Carl J. Burckhardt (right), in conversation with his colleague Luc Bischoff (1909–1997) in 1948. The Burckhardt family belongs to the Basel Daig.

It is noteworthy that, from the end of World War II until the 1980s, Switzerland's representation in Paris was largely entrusted to gentlemen with no prior ambassadorial experience, yet who enjoyed considerable personal and professional prestige. They typically remained at their posts for extended periods, sometimes as long as ten years. Surprisingly, most of them did not come from the Romandy. Among the most illustrious of these diplomats were Agostino Giorgio Soldati and Carl J. Burckhardt.

"At the Hôtel de Besenval, you were sure to find not only the elite of Parisian society, but above all a wonderfully balanced representation of the most diverse circles of society drawn from politics, literature and art."

— Sénateur Édouard Bonnefous

Ambassador François de Ziegler was the last ambassador in Paris to join the diplomatic service before the introduction of the admission competition, the concours diplomatique. He had joined the diplomatic service in 1945 and served in France from 1977 to 1987. Hence, he was the last gentleman ambassador to France.

François de Ziegler was a member of the Institut de France, an honour seldom granted to foreigners, reflecting his successful integration into France's high society and greatly aiding his professional activities. The Swiss Confederation profited from his remarkable network and persuasive eloquence, which proved invaluable in advancing its interests. François de Ziegler was widely recognised as an exceptional networker and a skilled facilitator of high-level contacts.

Yet the role of the traditional diplomat has changed profoundly in recent years, not least as a result of the institutionalisation of direct communication at government level via social media between 2012 and 2016, as well as the intensification of ministerial-level visit diplomacy. As the rules-based international order and traditional diplomatic institutions face mounting pressure, personal relationships and informal networks among the world's top political leaders have become ever more important. Increasingly, diplomacy is shaped by direct contacts between ministers, heads of government and heads of state.

In the past, members of the Federal Council would have sent diplomats to handle sensitive issues on their behalf. Today, international contacts are far more frequent and direct. Negotiations increasingly take place at ministerial level, requiring federal councillors to engage personally.

== First permanent French diplomatic representation in Switzerland ==
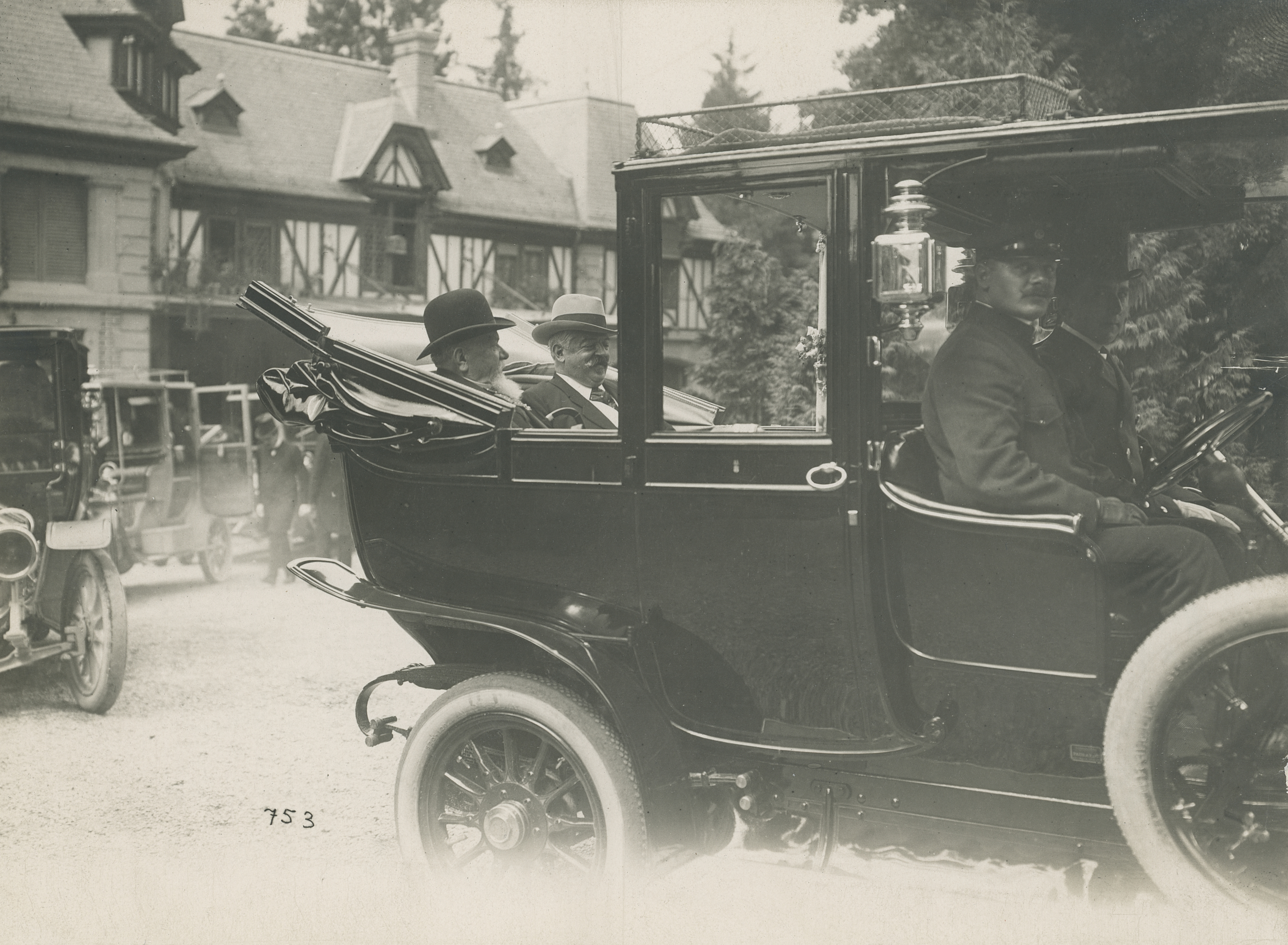
15 August 1910 – the first state visit ever to the Swiss Confederation (Federal State of 1848) takes place: The President of the Swiss Confederation, Robert Comtesse (right), and the President of the French Republic, Armand Fallières, leave the cour d'honneur of the French ambassador's residence at 44 Sulgeneckstrasse in Bern in a brand new De Dion-Bouton Landaulet Type CH for a city tour (this model was only produced in 1910).

In the aftermath of the Battle of Marignano, the Paix Perpétuelle (Perpetual Peace) of 1516 and the mercenary alliance of 1521, France had already opened a permanent diplomatic representation in 1522 on Swiss territory, however, without a permanent residence for the ambassador. Instead, the French ambassador travelled with the members of the Tagsatzung to the respective venues. Opened by order of King François I, this embassy on Swiss territory was the first permanent French embassy in the world, followed by the establishment of French embassies in London and Venice.

=== Solothurn – the City of Ambassadors ===
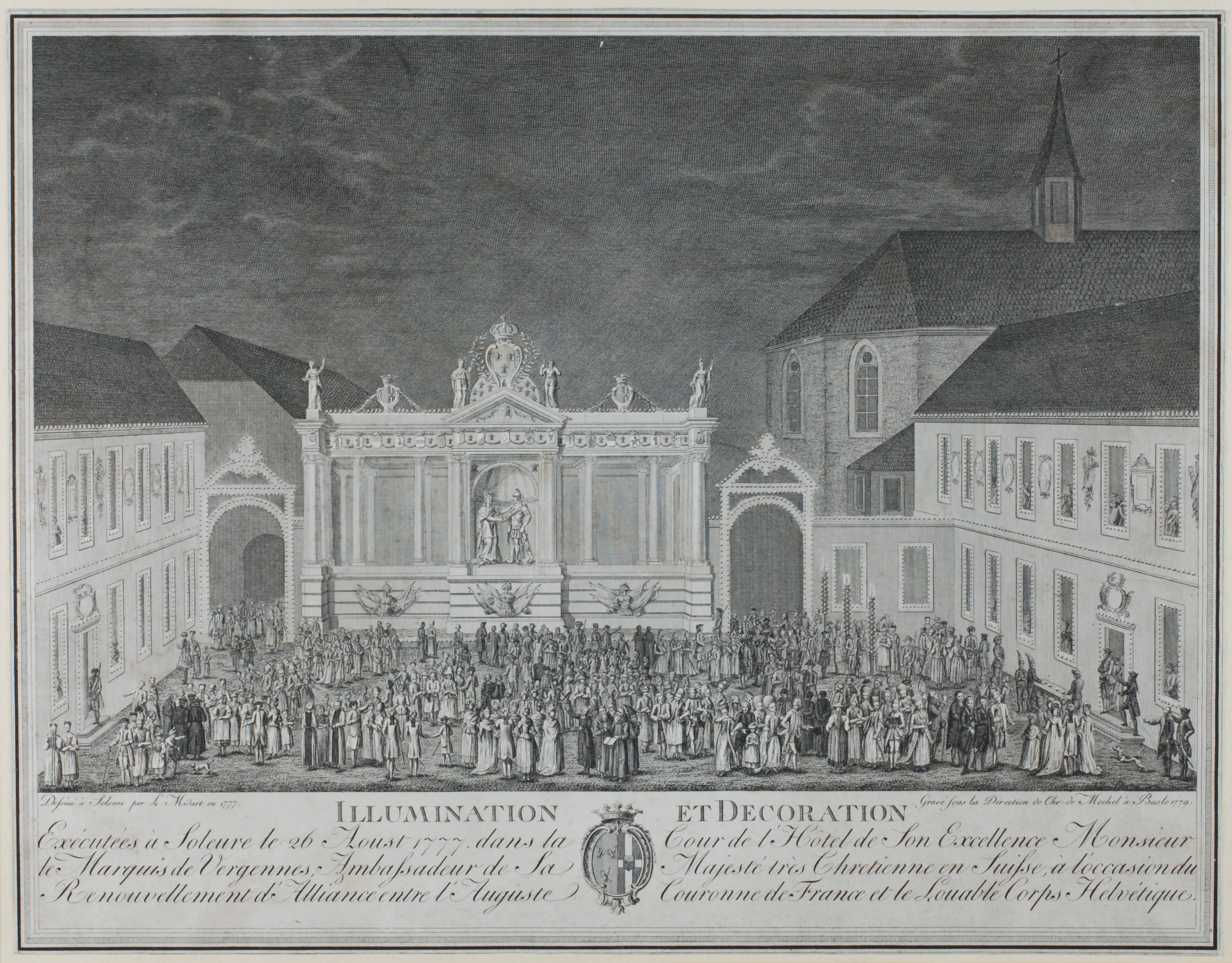
The courtyard of the Ambassadorenhof in Solothurn in the late 1770s.

It was not until 1530 that the French ambassador moved into permanent residence on Swiss territory, in the city of Solothurn. The ambassador had his seat in the Ambassadorenhof, a building that still exists today. On 19 May 1717, however, a major fire destroyed large parts of the ambassador's residence. In 1725, the residence was rebuilt, according to the plans of the Vorarlberg architect Franz Beer. The first French ambassador to move into the Ambassadorenhof was Louis d'Augerand, Seigneur de Boisrigaut. The presence of the French ambassador significantly increased the importance of Solothurn and unofficially made the city a center of the political, economic and social life of the Old Swiss Confederacy. Therefore, the city of Solothurn is still called the City of Ambassadors today. However, the last French ambassador in Solothurn, Charles-Olivier de Saint-Georges, Marquis de Vérac, left the city in 1792 during the French Revolution. The French ambassador has resided in Bern since 1799.

In the heyday of the 18th century, many personalities visited the French ambassadors in Solothurn. Among the most famous visitors were Voltaire, who visited in 1756 and 1758, and Giacomo Casanova, who stayed in May and June 1760, both hosted by Ambassador Anne-Théodore Chevignard, Chevalier de Chavigny, Comte de Toulongeon et Baron d'Uchon.

=== Monsieur l'Ambassadeur and the Special Relationship ===
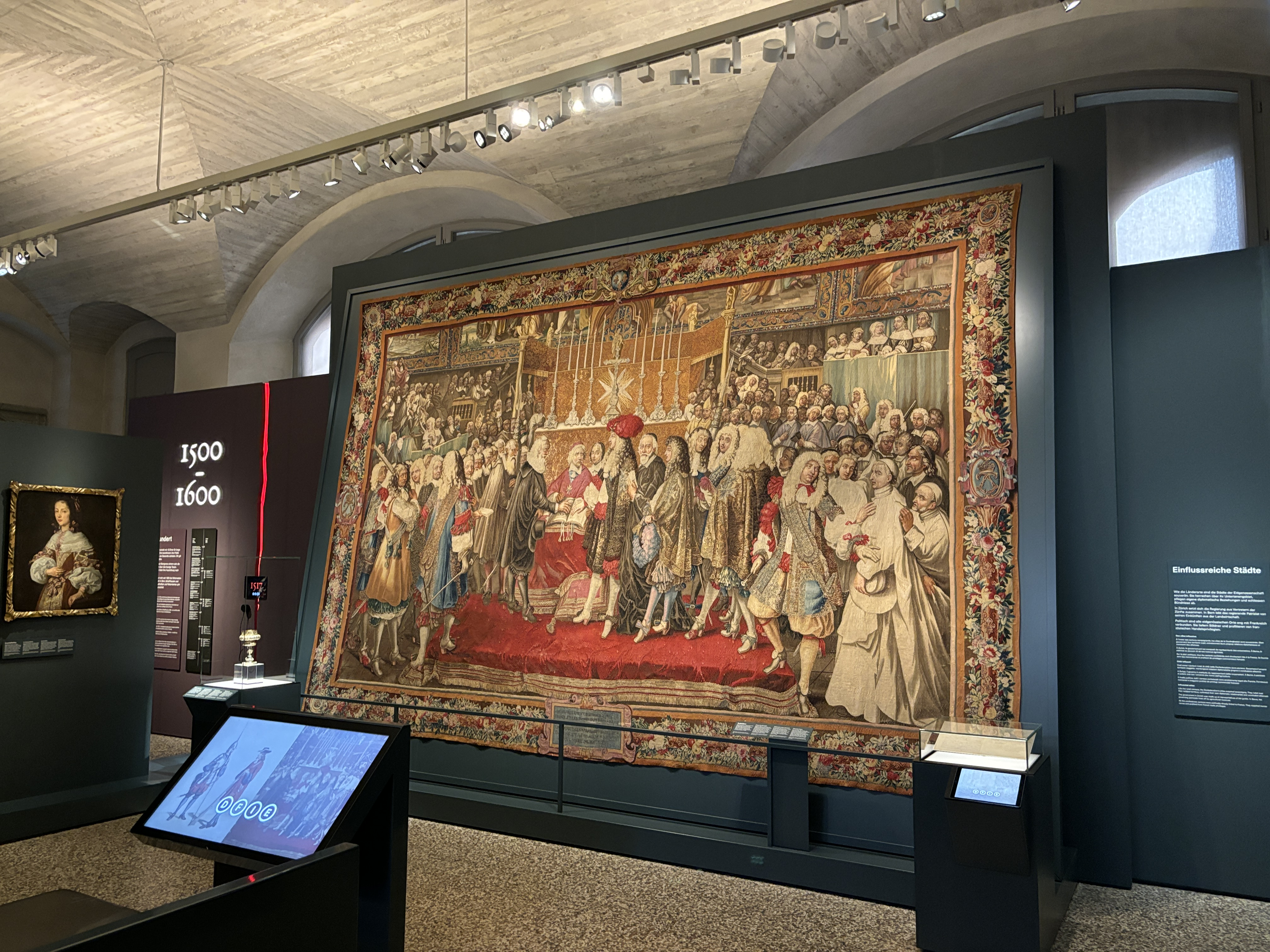
Seven copies of this Alliance Tapestry were made (executed between 1665 and 1742). Four of the seven copies have survived. In addition to the copy in the Hôtel de Besenval, there is also a copy in the Château de Versailles, in the Museum of the Gobelins Manufactory and in the Swiss National Museum in Zürich, as seen in the picture (acquired by the Gottfried Keller Foundation in Paris in June 1896 as part of the sale of the Dreyfus-de Gonzalès Collection for FRF 88,000).

An interesting aspect of Franco-Swiss diplomatic history is that, until 1953, only the French head of mission was permitted to hold the title of Ambassador to Switzerland. It was only from February 1953 that all foreign heads of mission in Switzerland, previously envoys, were allowed to bear the title.

Times had changed. By the end of 1955, the Federal Council recognised that the title of ambassador, due to its widespread use, no longer carried its former prestige. The Swiss Confederation took this as an opportunity to gradually promote its heads of mission from envoys to ambassadors, thereby raising legations to the rank of embassies. The Swiss Legation in Paris was upgraded to an embassy in 1957, and the process was completed in 1964 with the elevation of the last two Swiss legations.

==== Kings, presidents and ambassadors ====
The Special Relationship between Switzerland and France has deep roots. A turning point was the Battle of Marignano and the subsequent peace treaty, the Paix Perpétuelle (Perpetual Peace) of 1516, followed by the mercenary alliance of 1521 that emerged from these negotiations. The renewal of this mercenary alliance, the Soldallianz von Luzern, on 18 November 1663 in the Cathédrale Notre-Dame de Paris, in the presence of King Louis XIV, went down in history as one of the king's most important diplomatic achievements. Its significance is underscored by the Alliance Tapestry, a copy of which is on display in the Hôtel de Besenval.

Mutual appreciation was repeatedly expressed at the highest level, often resulting in personal friendships:

"Le grand ambassadeur et l'ami de la France."

— Général Charles de Gaulle, Président de la République Française, in memory of Ambassador Agostino Giorgio Soldati

== Ambassadors of Switzerland to France ==
"The head of mission in Paris quickly realises that, in a Western capital which combines the prestige of an unparalleled past with the reality of an intense political and international life, it is not enough simply to be a diplomat. Professional virtuosity alone, even at its highest level, is far from sufficient. Access to the capital's circles – and therefore not only to official ones – brings the representative of a country, whether small or large, weak or powerful, distant or close, into contact with an intellectual and social elite that is as demanding of itself as it is of foreigners."

— Ambassador Agostino Giorgio Soldati

=== From 1798 until 1957 as the Swiss envoy, called Minister ===
- 1798–1800: Peter Josef Zeltner (1765–1830)
- 1800–1800: Gottlieb Abraham von Jenner (1765–1834)
- 1800–1803: Philipp Albert Stapfer (1766–1840)
- 1803–1814: Antoine Constantin de Maillardoz, Marquis de Maillardoz (1765–1832)
- 1814–1847: Georg von Tschann (1777–1847)
- 1848–1857: Josef Hyazint Barmann (1800–1885)
- 1857–1883: Johann Konrad Kern (1808–1888), first Envoy Extraordinary and Minister Plenipotentiary
- 1883–1917: Charles Édouard Lardy (1847–1923), one of the first professional Swiss diplomats (career diplomat)
- 1917–1938: Alphonse Dunant (1869–1942)
- 1938–1944: Walter Stucki (1888–1963), from July 1940 to September 1944 in Vichy (departure from Paris on 10 June; arrival in Vichy on 3 July)
- 1945–1949: Carl J. Burckhardt (1891–1974), one of the most illustrious Swiss diplomats
- 1949–1956: Peter Anton von Salis (1898–1982)

=== From 1957 as the Swiss ambassador: The upgrade from a legation to an embassy ===
- 1956–1961: Pierre Micheli (1905–1989), first as Minister, from 1957 as Ambassador
- 1961–1966: Agostino Giorgio Soldati (1910–1966), his wife's wealth and influence benefited his work
- 1967–1977: Pierre Dupont (1912–1993)
- 1977–1987: François de Ziegler (1922–2006), the last gentleman ambassador to France
- 1987–1993: Carlo Jagmetti (* 1932), as ambassador to the US (1993–1997), he became embroiled in the Dormant Accounts Controversy, leading to his resignation from the diplomatic service in 1997 – a move unprecedented in Swiss diplomatic history. His resignation was triggered by the publication on 26 January 1997 in the SonntagsZeitung of a confidential report from the embassy in Washington, in an article titled "Botschafter Jagmetti beleidigt die Juden", which contained only excerpts or paraphrased passages of the confidential report. The resignation of Ambassador Jagmetti took place two days after the publication of the article in the SonntagsZeitung.
- 1993–1997: Edouard Brunner (1932–2007)
- 1997–2002: Benedict de Tscharner (1937–2019)
- 2002–2007: François Nordmann (* 1942)
- 2007–2011: Ulrich Lehner (* 1954)
- 2011–2014: Jean-Jacques de Dardel (* 1954)
- 2014–2018: Bernardino Regazzoni (* 1957)
- 2018–2020: Livia Leu Agosti (* 1961), first female Swiss ambassador to France
- 2020–2025: Roberto Balzaretti (* 1965)
- From 2025: Tania Cavassini (* 1967)

== Seats of the Swiss diplomatic mission in Paris since the mid-19th century ==
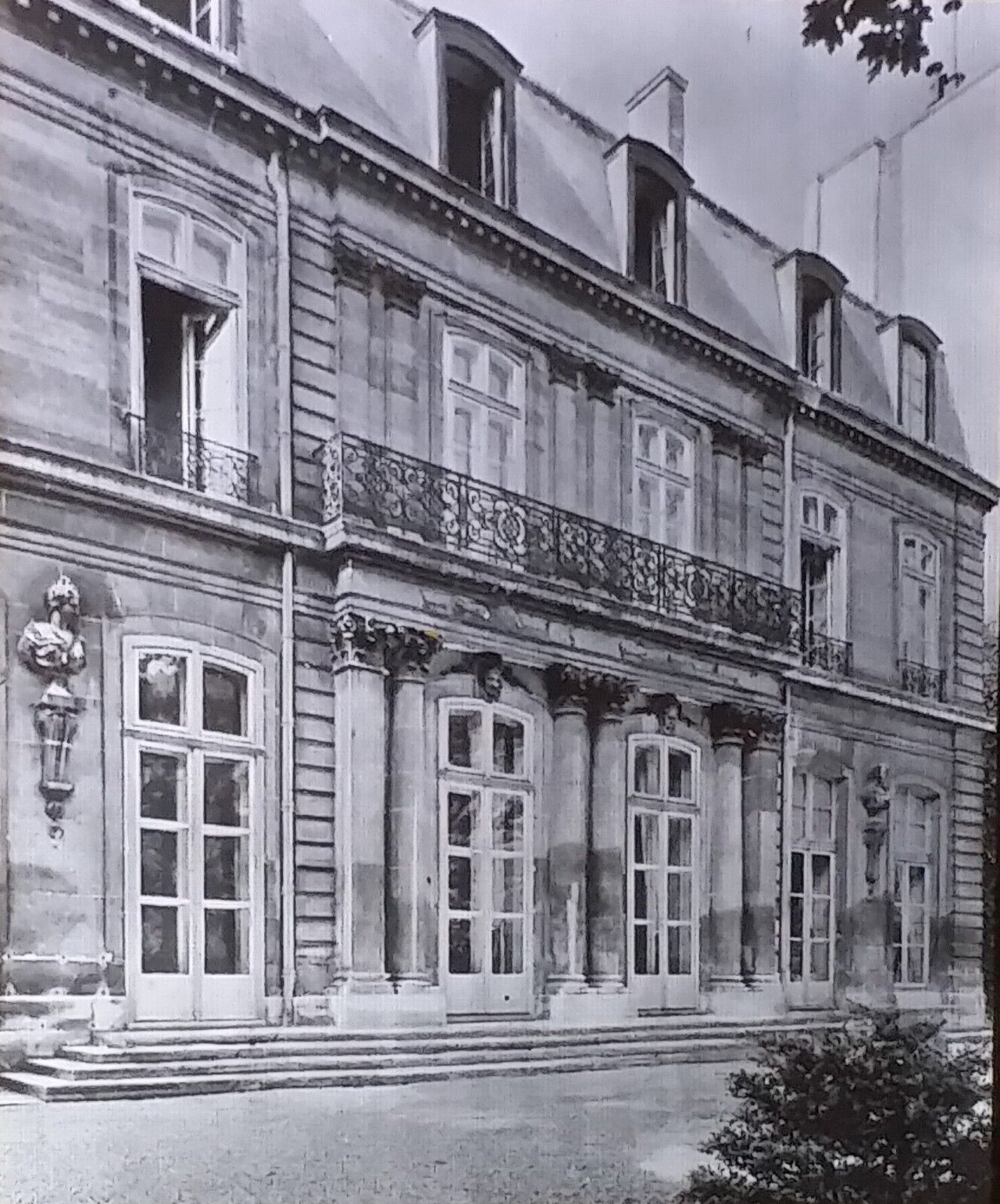
One of the earliest photos of the Hôtel de Besenval: A photographic glass slide made in the second half of the 19th century (after 1866), showing the garden façade of the residence. Glass slides were projected with a magic lantern.

- 1857–1859: 14 Avenue des Champs-Elysées
- 1860–1864: 3 Rue d'Aumale
- 1865–1883: 3 Rue Blanche
- 1884–1894: 4 Rue Cambon
- 1895–1918: 15bis Rue de Marignan
- 1919–1938: 51 Avenue Hoche
- since 1938: 142 Rue de Grenelle
  From July 1940 to September 1944 in Vichy under the Vichy regime in the following properties: From July 1940 to November 1942 in the Hôtel des Ambassadeurs in two small rooms. One of them was the bedroom of Minister Walter Stucki, which also served as his office and salon. Over time, Walter Stucki finally managed to get a total of six rooms. And from November 1942 to September 1944 in the Villa Ica, 114 Boulevard des États-Unis. In July 1940 de facto, and in the summer of 1941 officially – under pressure from Germany – the Swiss Legation in Paris was downgraded to a consulate.

=== La maison française la plus suisse qui ait jamais été ===
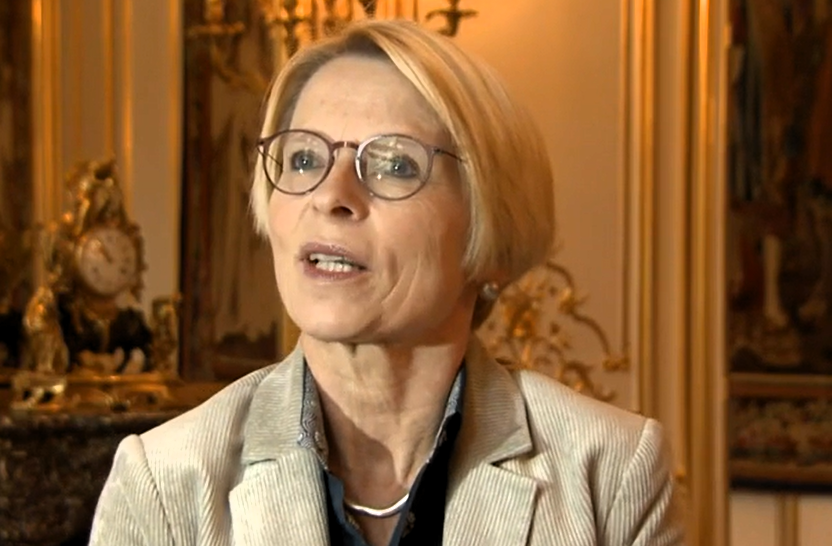
Livia Leu Agosti, the first female Swiss ambassador to France, at the Hôtel de Besenval (Salon de la tapisserie).

To fulfil their primary task of maintaining diplomatic relations, an ambassador depends on having the right framework conditions. Above all, this includes an appropriate ambassador's residence reflecting the prestige of the nation.

==== Hôtel de Besenval ====
In 1938, the Swiss Confederation was fortunate enough to acquire what is probably "la maison française la plus suisse qui ait jamais été" (the most Swiss French house that ever was): The Hôtel de Besenval on the Rue de Grenelle, a residence with a rich Franco-Swiss history reflected in the life of Pierre Victor, Baron de Besenval de Brunstatt, a Swiss military officer in French service, whom Charles Augustin Sainte-Beuve once called "le Suisse le plus français qui ait jamais été" (the most French Swiss that ever was).

The Hôtel de Besenval occupies a unique place among Switzerland's embassy buildings in that it possesses, through the figure of Pierre Victor, Baron de Besenval, a centuries-old history that is intertwined with the shared history of France and Switzerland. No other Swiss embassy building embodies such a historical connection with its host country. In this respect, the Hôtel de Besenval is unique.

"The Hôtel de Besenval is a diplomatic working instrument. Because of its history – particularly its association with the Baron de Besenval – it also holds historical significance for Franco-Swiss relations. As a result, it is a residence that attracts people. Accordingly, people are keen to visit the Swiss Embassy. In this way, the Hôtel de Besenval helps us to keep the Swiss Confederation present in public discourse in France."

— Ambassador Livia Leu Agosti

== Gallery: Selected manuscripts relating to the Swiss diplomatic mission in Paris ==
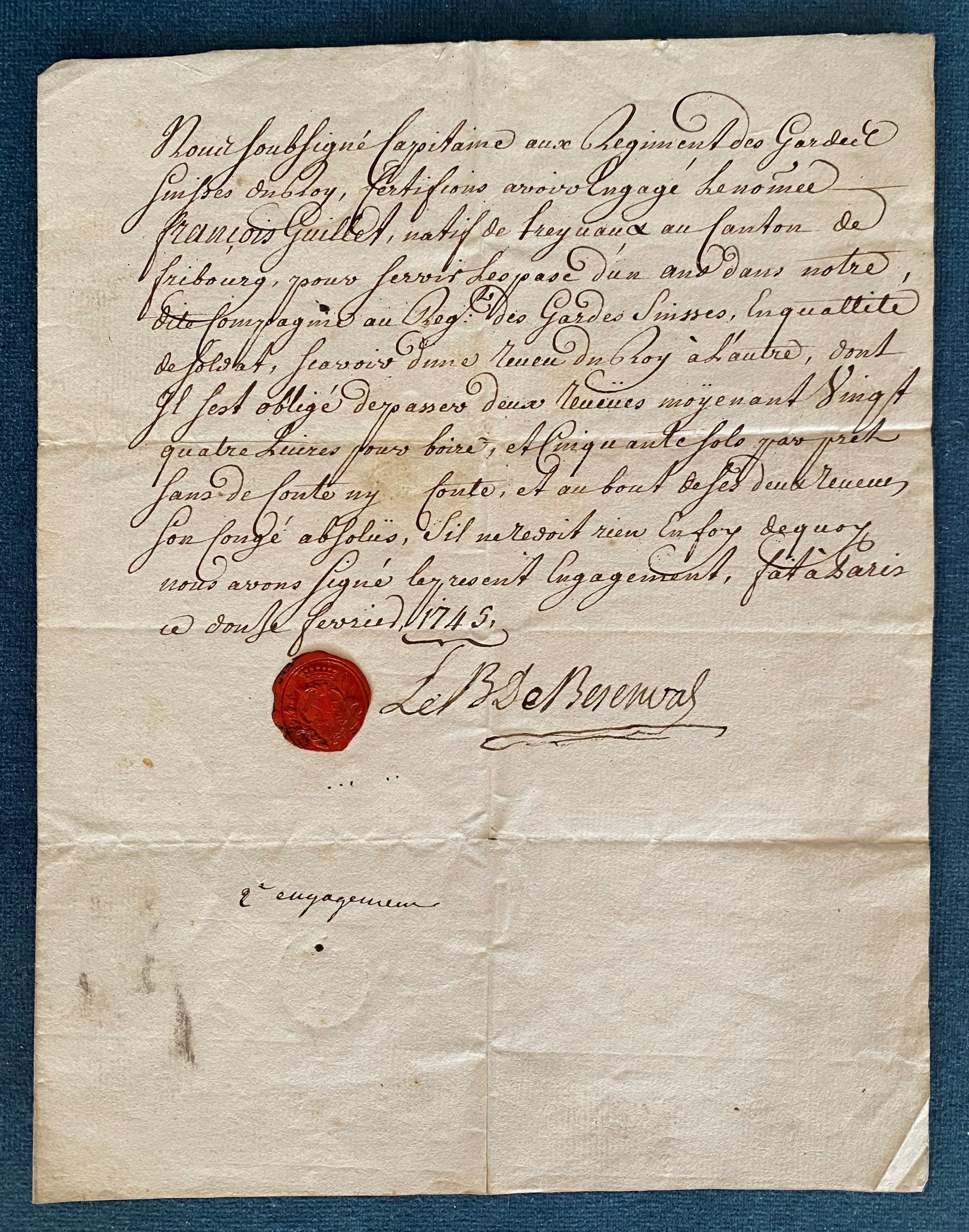
Original document by Pierre Victor, Baron de Besenval de Brunstatt, with his seal, signed and dated, Paris, 12 February 1745 (in his capacity as Captain of the Company de Besenval, his company in the Swiss Guards Regiment). The baron was not only the illustrious owner of the Hôtel de Besenval, he also acted as a special envoy for the Old Swiss Confederacy

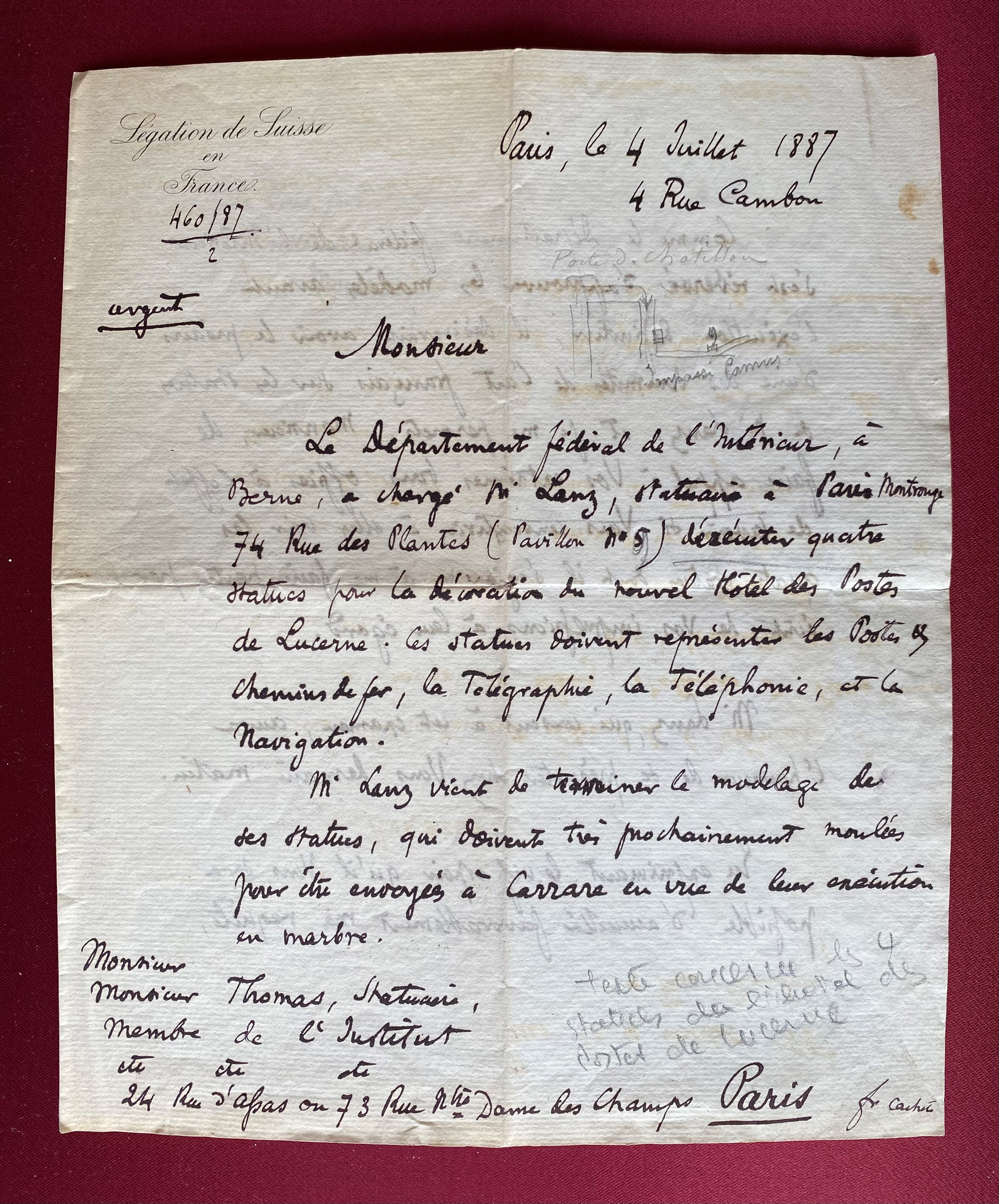
Letter from the Swiss envoy Charles Édouard Lardy to the sculptor Gabriel Thomas (page one). Dated: 4 July, 1887, 4 Rue Cambon, Paris

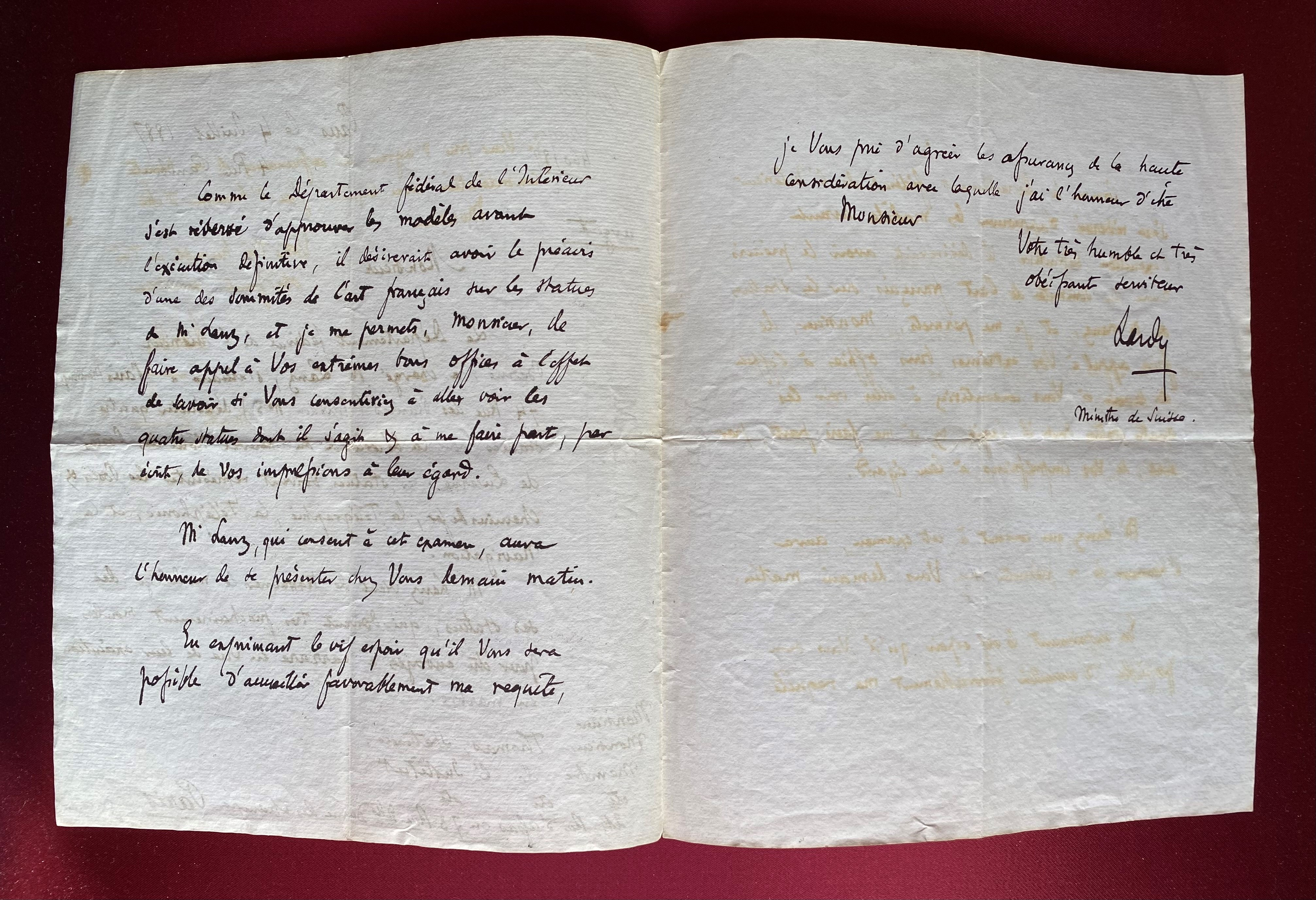
Letter from the Swiss envoy Charles Édouard Lardy to the sculptor Gabriel Thomas from 1887 (pages two and three). Signed: Lardy, Ministre de Suisse

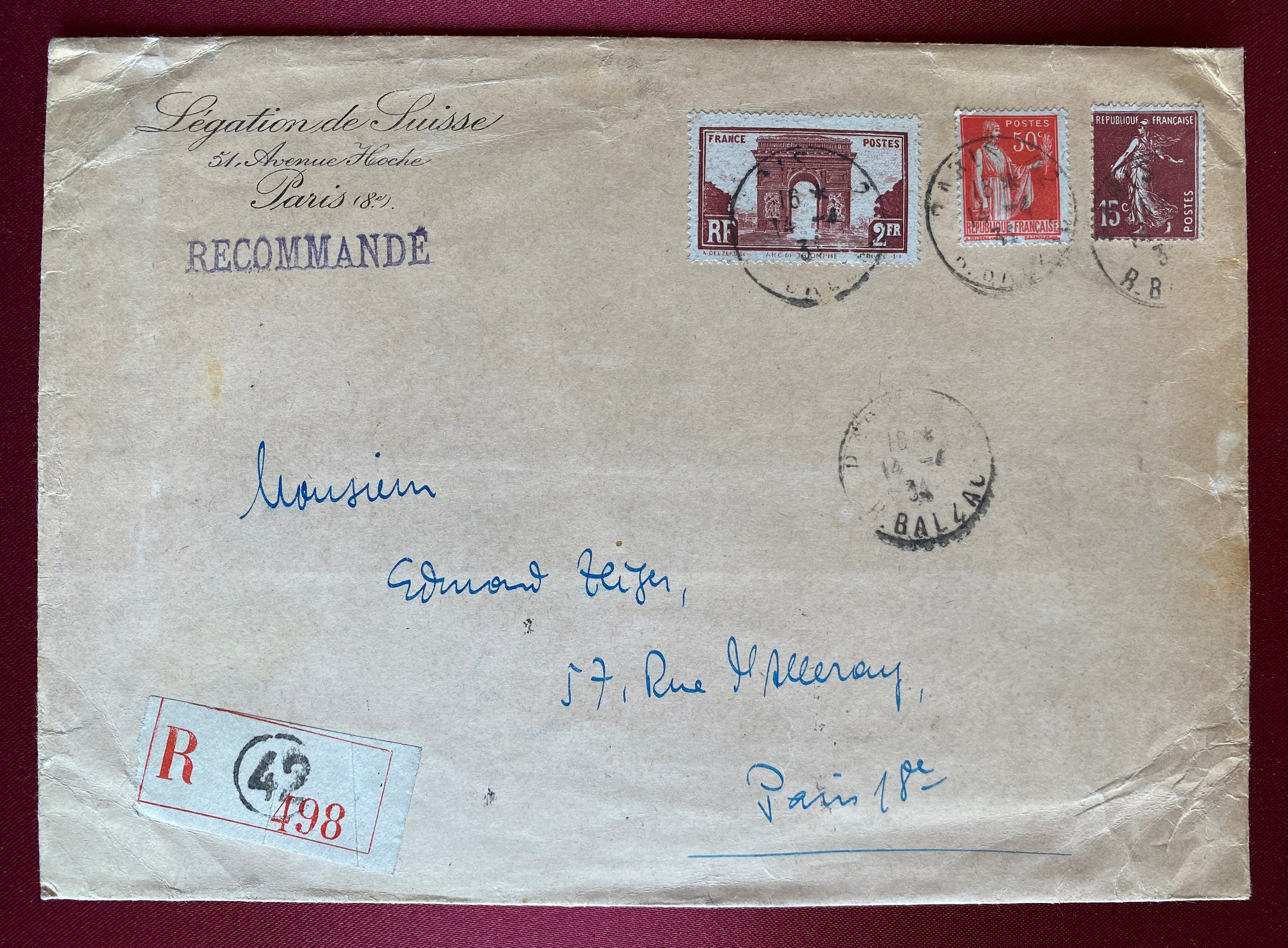
Envelope of the Swiss Legation in Paris, dated 14 April 1934, showing its former address at 51 Avenue Hoche, before the legation relocated in 1938 to the Hôtel de Besenval at 142 Rue de Grenelle (on the reverse: handstamp of the Swiss Legation in Paris)
