= L. aurea =

L. aurea may refer to:

- Lalage aurea, the rufous-bellied triller, a bird species endemic to Indonesia
- Lamarckia aurea, the goldentop grass, a plant species originating from the Mediterranean area
- Lindmania aurea, a plant species endemic to Venezuela
- Litoria aurea, the green and golden bell frog, a ground-dwelling tree frog species native to eastern Australia
- Livia aurea, a fungus species

== See also ==
- Aurea (disambiguation)
