= Jean-Jacques de Dardel =

Former ambassador of Switzerland to China

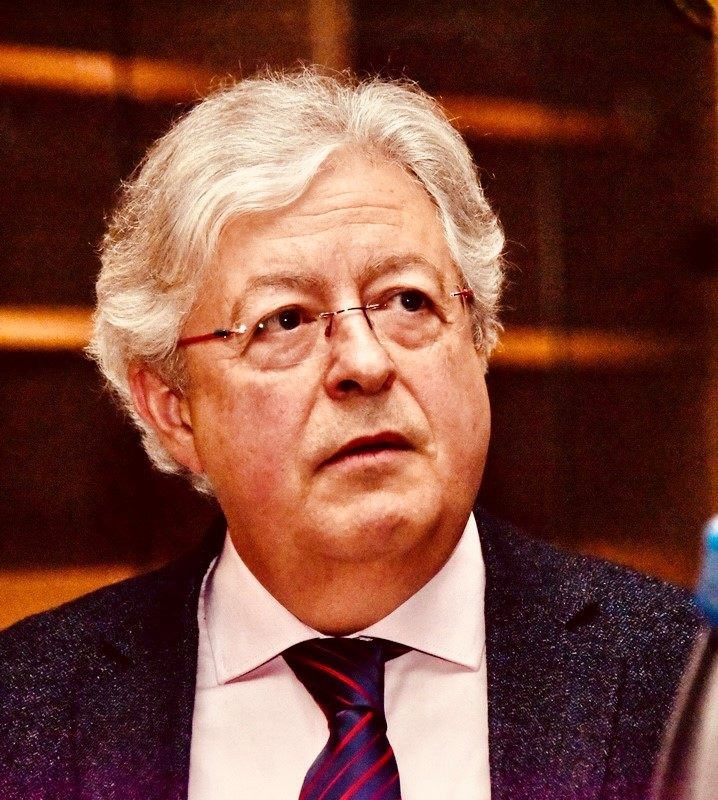
- Jean-Jacques de Dardel
- Born: 8 August 1954 (age 71); Neuchâtel, Switzerland
- Education: Master of Economics University of Geneva. PhD in Political Science and International Relations Graduate Institute of International Studies

Jean-Jacques de Dardel (born 8 August 1954) is a Swiss civil servant with a background in International Diplomatic Affairs, Academia and Statesmanship.

== Early life and education ==
Born on 8 August 1954, to diplomat parents, originally from Neuchâtel (NE) and Nendaz (VS) in Switzerland, Jean-Jacques de Dardel studied in the United States, Brazil, Canada, and Switzerland. He obtained a French Baccalaureate C (Scientific), a Masters in Political Economy from the University of Geneva, a Diploma in International Studies, and a Doctorate in Political Science/International Relations from the Graduate Institute of International Studies in Geneva.

== Career ==
In 1976, he joined the International Committee of the Red Cross as Jurist Secretary at the Conference on the Development of International Humanitarian Law. He joined the Federal Department of Foreign Affairs in 1981 and began his career in Bern (State Secretariat for Economic Affairs and Political Secretariat) and in Vienna (Attaché at the Embassy of Switzerland). In 1983, he was appointed diplomatic collaborator with Political Division 1, in charge of Eastern Europe, then Southern Europe. At the same time, in 1986 he set up and directed the Service de la Francophonie, supporting Switzerland's participation in the International Organization of La Francophonie.

He was transferred to Washington in 1989 as First Secretary, then as Embassy Counselor in charge of political affairs and the media. In 1993, he became Deputy Head of the Swiss Embassy in Canberra, Australia and Chargé d'Affaires in Papua New Guinea and Vanuatu. He launched various economic exploration missions across Australia and developed the Embassy's public relations and cultural activities.

In 1996, he was transferred to Paris as Minister-Counsellor for Cultural Affairs and La Francophonie, before becoming in 1998 Ambassador to the OIF and Personal Representative of the President of the Confederation to the Permanent Council of La Francophonie (CPF). As such, he was elected to the presidency of various committees of the OIF. He also served as the personal representative of SG Boutros Boutros-Ghali during international missions. Subsequently, he became the Head of the Center for International Security Policy at the Federal Department of Foreign Affairs (FDFA) in Bern (2001-2004).

From 2004 until 2007, he was Head of the Political Division I (Europe, Central Asia, Council of Europe, OSCE) as Ambassador/Assistant Secretary of State. He was the National Coordinator for the Stability Pact for South East Europe and conflict resolution negotiator in two crisis regions. As of May 2007, Dr. de Dardel was Swiss Ambassador to Belgium and Head of the Swiss Mission to NATO. From 2011 until 2014, he was Swiss Ambassador to France and Monaco, with residence at the Hôtel de Besenval. In addition, in 2013 he was Head of the Swiss Delegation to UNESCO and Ambassador to the OIF. He went on to be the Vice-President of the 34th session of the UNESCO Heritage Committee.

From early 2014 to March 2019, he was the Swiss Ambassador to China, Mongolia and North Korea with residence in Beijing. As such, he led the largest Swiss diplomatic mission and consular and cooperation network abroad.

Upon completion of his diplomatic career, he joined a number of Swiss and international companies ranging from Fortune 500 to start-ups and scale ups as member of their Board of Directors or Advisory Board. He is President of the Economy of Trust Foundation, member of the SICPA Strategic Advisory Board, President of the Board of Swiss Centers Foundation and Group, Vice-President and Professor of Xinrui Business School and lecturer at the University of Zurich, President of Lemania International School Altdorf and member of the board of the Bella Vista Group, Finma approved board member of Coninco SA and One Creation Cooperative financial companies, board member of MedXcell and MLS medical companies and Cyber Ambassador of ACP - Assured Cyber Protection. Founder and Chairman of Sinoglade International Consulting SA.

== Works and publications ==
- L'Evolution en Suisse de la conception de la coopération au développement (1980).
- La coopération au développement: certitudes et interrogations (1981).
- Le Mont Athos, Itinéraire d'une Découverte (1982).
- L'art Aborigène Australien ou les Voix de la Terre (1995).
- Et vint notre fin de siècle (1999).
- Aborigian Art, An Immemorial Fountain of Youth (2000).
- L'art contemporain des Aborigènes d'Australie (2009).
- Whither the Euro-Atlantic Partnership? Partnership and NATO's new strategic concept (2009).
- Le Mayen de Nendaz (2011).
- L'Hôtel de Besenval (2013).
- 1663: Le Renouvellement de l'Alliance avec le Roi de France (2013).
- Suisse - Chine: une culture du rapprochement (2016).
- Swiss - Chinese Relations: The Golden Blossom of a Cultured Evergreen! (2018).
