= Alphonse Dunant =

Swiss political scientist and diplomat

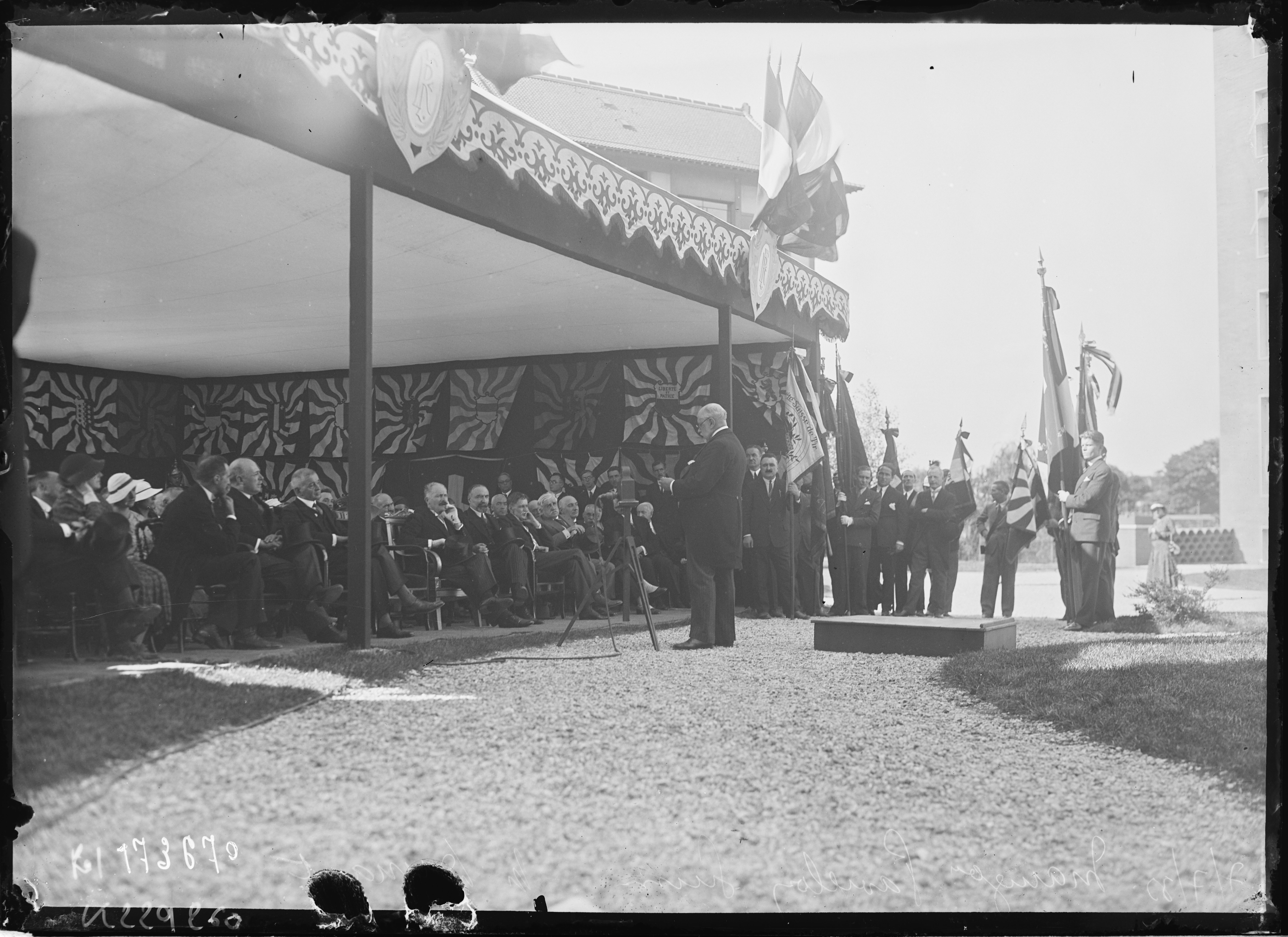
- 7 July 1933 – Paris: Inauguration of the Pavillon Suisse at the Cité internationale universitaire de Paris with Alphonse Dunant giving a speech in the presence of the President of France, Albert Lebrun (front row, wearing white gloves and with his left hand on the corner of his mouth).
- Born: 29 June 1869; Le Petit-Saconnex (Geneva), Switzerland
- Died: 27 November 1942 (aged 73); Geneva, Switzerland
- Occupation: Diplomat
- Spouse: Elisa Marcuard
- Relatives: Henri Dunant (uncle)

Alphonse Dunant (1869–1942) was a Swiss political scientist, diplomat and Envoy of the Swiss Confederation to Argentina and France. His family originated from Geneva.

Alphonse Dunant was the nephew of Henri Dunant, the founder of the Red Cross.

== Education and career ==
After attending school in Geneva and studying political sciences in Geneva, Basel and Heidelberg, where he received his doctorate in 1894, Alphonse Dunant joined the Federal Political Department (FPD) in the same year. As a young diplomat, he worked in Bern and was posted to Berlin, Paris and Rom.

From 1900 to 1904, Alphonse Dunant was the deputy secretary in the Federal Political Department (FPD). In 1910, he was appointed Envoy of the Swiss Confederation to Argentina with accreditations also in Uruguay and Paraguay. In 1914, his posting to Argentina ended and in 1915 he became the head of the Office of Foreign Affairs in the Federal Political Department (EPD). He held this position for three years.

=== Envoy to France and the Hôtel de Besenval ===
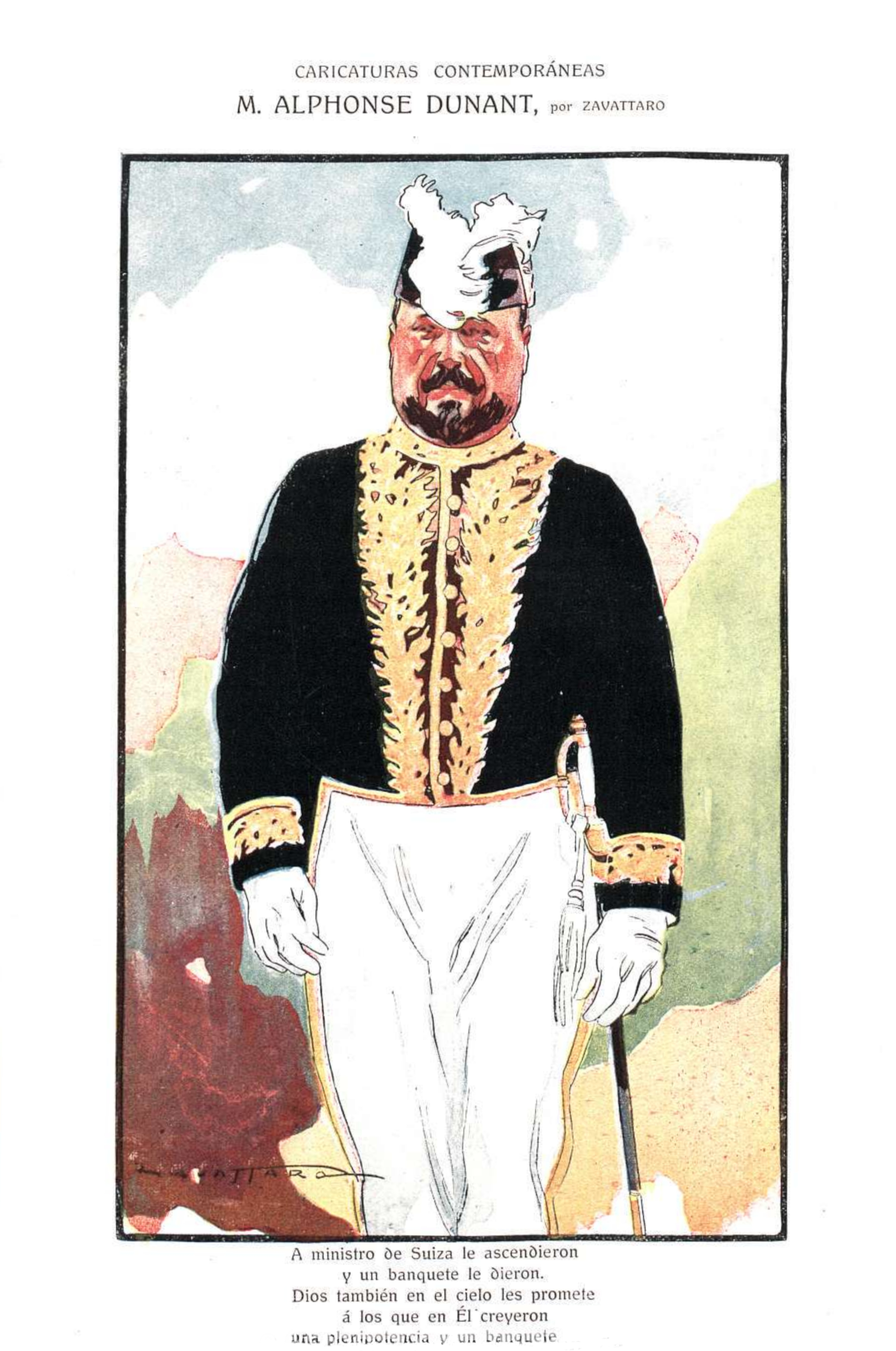
Contemporary caricature of Alphonse Dunant in his diplomatic uniform, the Alpine rose tailcoat (gold embroidery with alpine roses and edelweiss). The diplomatic uniform fell out of fashion after the democratisation of the Swiss diplomatic service in the late 1950s, when the era of the gentlemen diplomats came to an end. Drawing by Mario Zavattaro (1876–1932).

In 1917, Alphonse Dunant was appointed Envoy of the Swiss Confederation to France with an accreditation from 1918 to 1920 also in Brussels. One year after his arrival in the French capital, the Swiss Chamber of Commerce in France was founded and Alphonse Dunant was immediately appointed honorary president. Furthermore, it was on the initiative of Alphonse Dunant that the Comité des Présidents des Sociétés Suisses de Paris was founded.

In 1929, on the recommendation of Walter Stucki, Henry de Torrenté became the head of the trade department of the Swiss Legation in Paris. A personnel decision that Alphonse Dunant initially viewed rather critically, as he was rather suspicious of his young colleague's diligence. Alphonse Dunant's term of office in Paris lasted until 1938. His successor in office was Walter Stucki, whose protégé was Henry de Torrenté.

==== Hôtel de Besenval ====
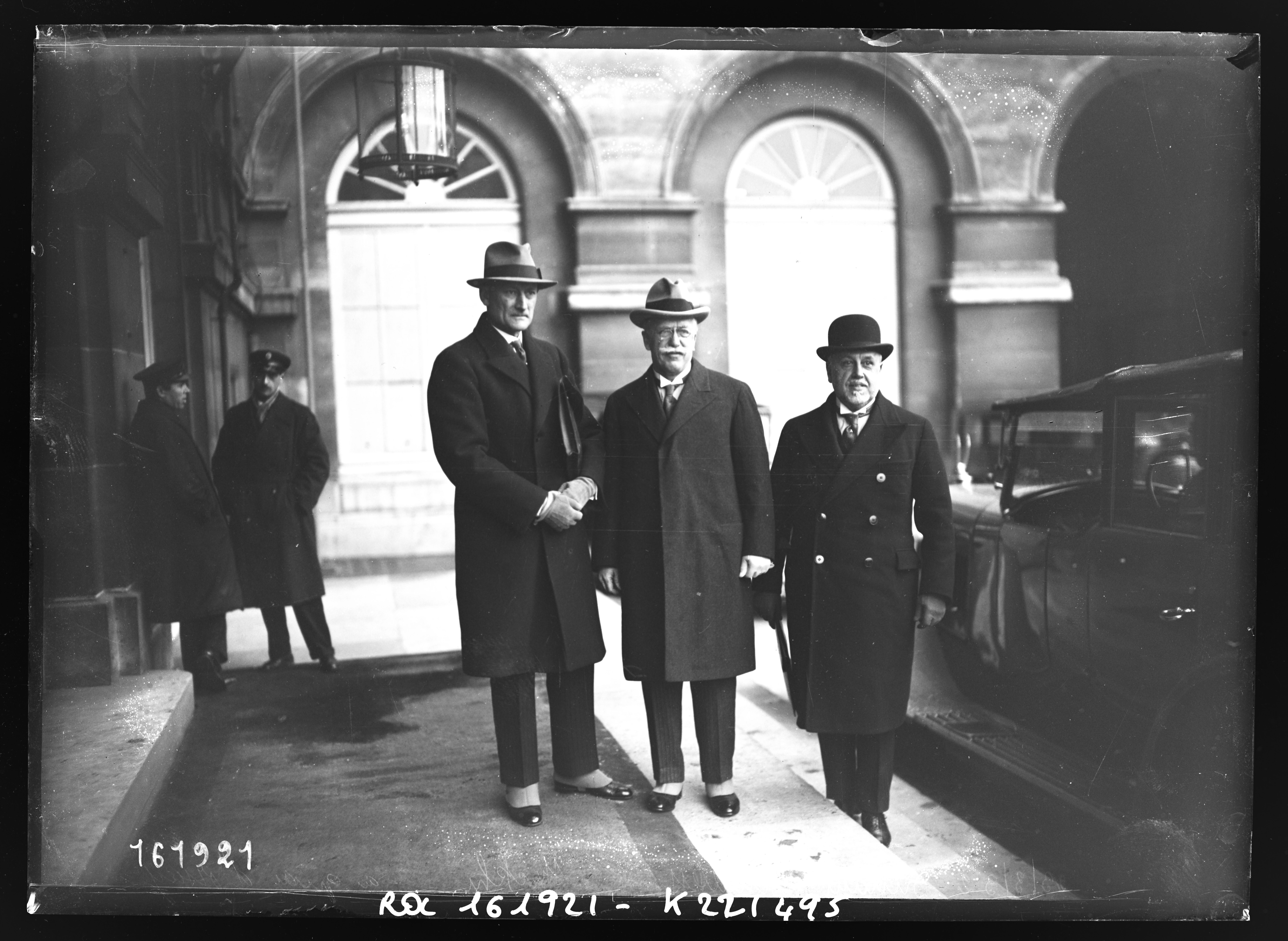
23 March 1932 – Quai d'Orsay: The two diplomats responsible for the purchase of the Hôtel de Besenval: The Swiss envoy, Minister Alphonse Dunant (right), and his successor Walter Stucki. In the middle: Federal Councillor Edmund Schulthess. In the background Minister Dunant's luxury car: An Avions Voisin.

In his capacity as Envoy of the Swiss Confederation, he was also responsible for implementing the strategy of the Swiss Foreign Minister Giuseppe Motta to strengthen Switzerland's presence in several important capitals, including Paris. Part of this strategy was the plan to purchase representative legation buildings in strategically favorable locations. Alphonse Dunant found the ideal building, the Hôtel de Besenval, which had been for sale since 1937. He led the initial purchase negotiations, which were then concluded in 1938 by his successor, Minister Walter Stucki. In addition to the building's ideal size, prestigious appearance and excellent location, its close historical connection to Switzerland also spoke in favour of the purchase. The Hôtel de Besenval was once the residence of Pierre Victor, Baron de Besenval de Brunstatt, a Swiss military officer in French service and confidant of Queen Marie Antoinette. The baron became notorious especially for his conduct during the Storming of the Bastille, for which he was criticised by both: The aristocrats and the revolutionaries.

The Hôtel de Besenval is also known as "la maison française la plus suisse qui ait jamais été" (the most Swiss French house that ever was), in reference to the fact that Charles Augustin Sainte-Beuve once called the Baron de Besenval de Brunstatt "le Suisse le plus français qui ait jamais été" (the most French Swiss that ever was).
