= François Nordmann =

Swiss diplomat

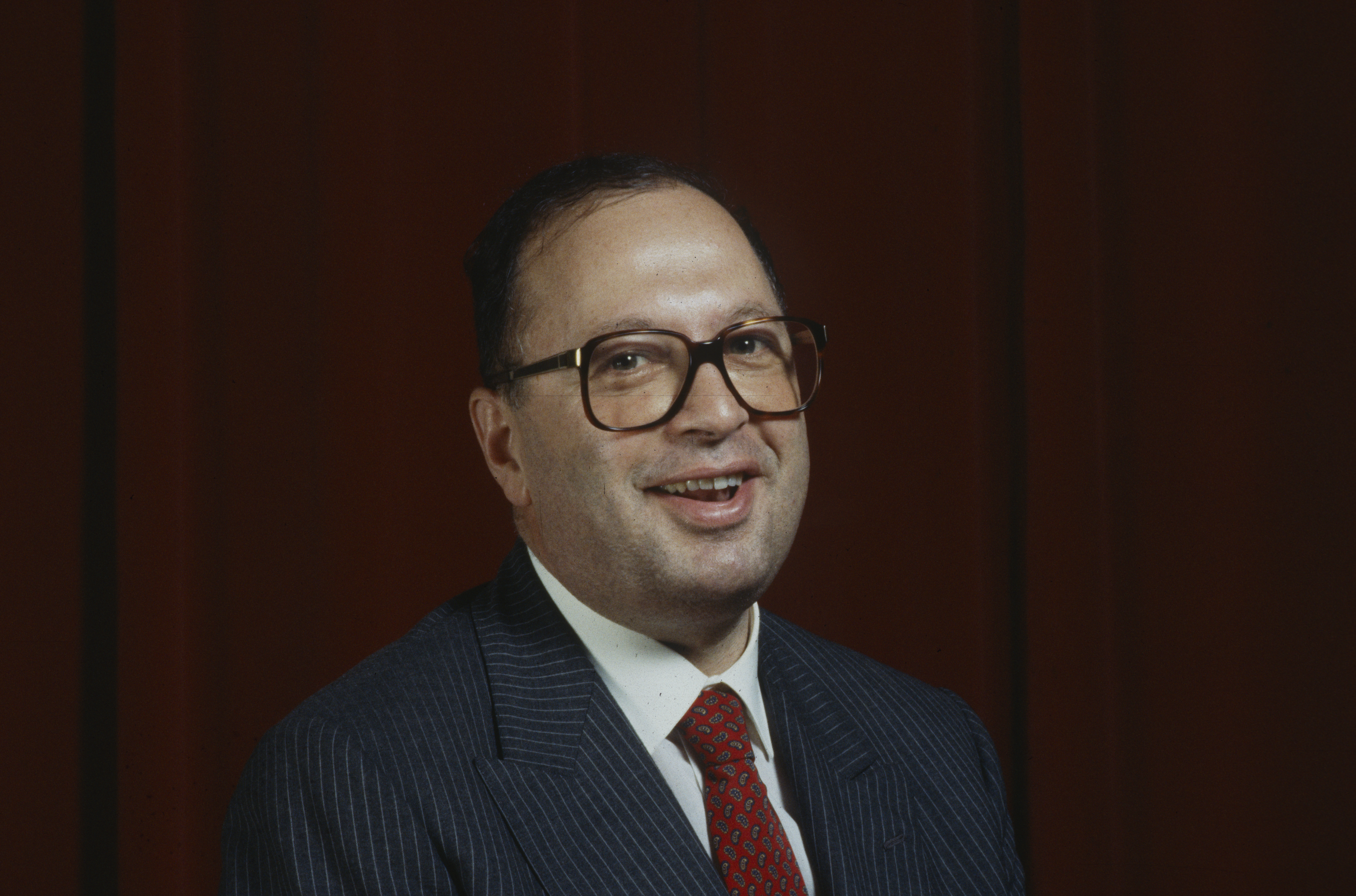
François Nordmann

François Nordmann (born 1942 in Fribourg) is a Swiss diplomat and a columnist who writes on foreign affairs.

== Training ==
Nordmann studied law at the University of Fribourg and the Graduate Institute of International Studies in Geneva.

== Career ==
From 1974 to 1980, Nordmann was an elected member of the Grand Council of Fribourg, the legislature of the canton of Fribourg, in Switzerland.

He then joined the Swiss Department of Foreign Affairs and in 1984 he was made ambassador to Guatemala, Costa Rica, Honduras, Nicaragua, Salvador et Panama.

In 1987, he became head of the Swiss delegation to UNESCO. He then headed the International Organizations Directorate of the Swiss Department of Foreign Affairs. Starting in 1994, he became the Swiss ambassador to Great Britain.

In 2000, he became the permanent representative of Switzerland to the United Nations in Geneva. He fought for the maintenance of the GATT (now the World Trade Organization) in Geneva.

He was the Swiss ambassador to France and Monaco from 2003 to 2007, with residence at the Hôtel de Besenval.

There, he collaborated with the French authorities to hold the G8 summit in Evian.

After his diplomatic career, Nordmann was president of the Fribourg International Film Festival from 2016 to 2018. He held that position until 2018.

In 2022, he started writing a regular column on foreign affairs for French-language newspaper Le Temps. Nordmann is regularly quoted in Swiss news media for his analysis of foreign affairs.

== Recognition ==
In 2021, the University of Fribourg awarded him an honorary doctorate.
