= Livia Leu Agosti =

Swiss diplomat (born 1961)

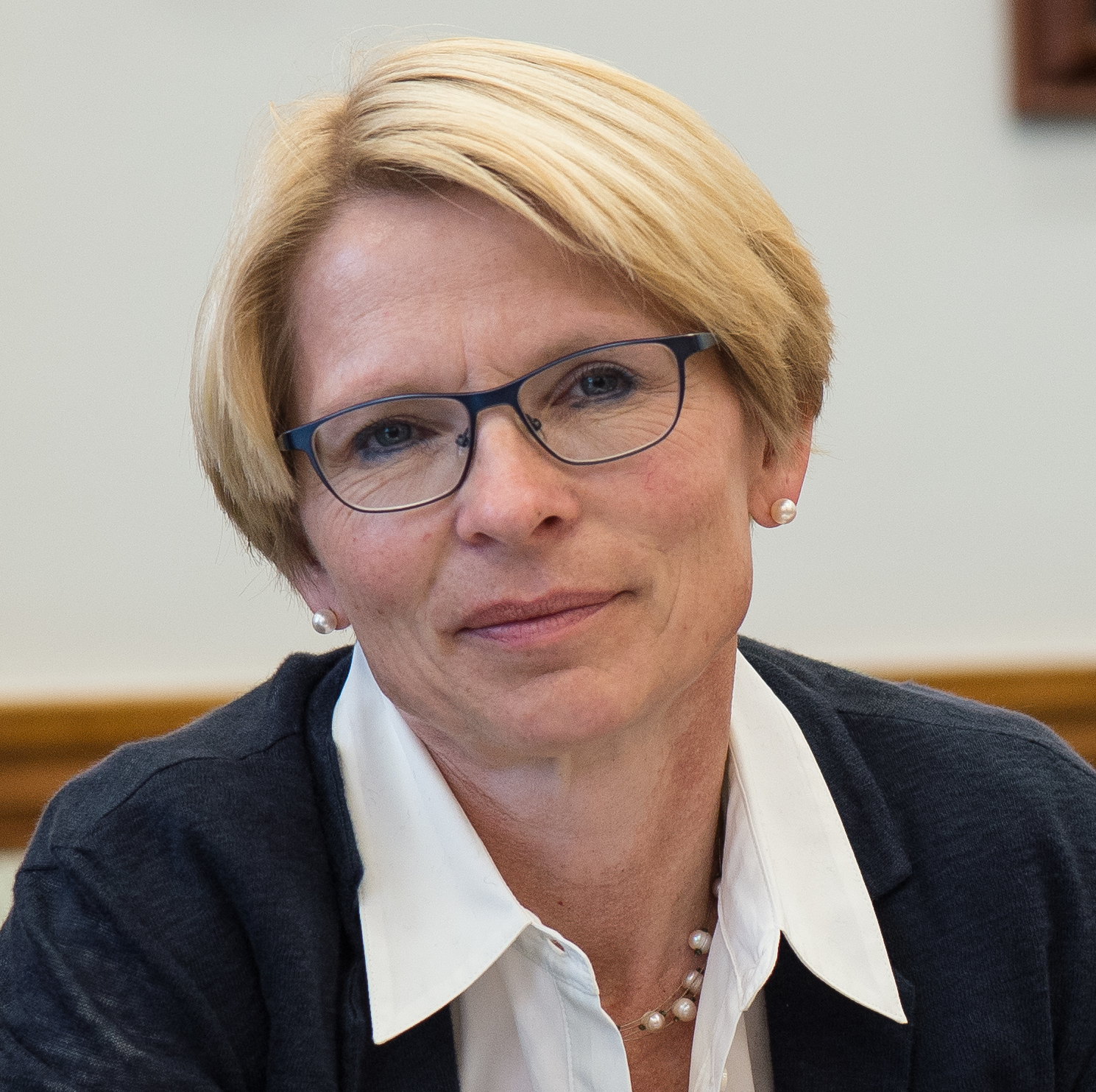
- Livia Leu Agosti (2016)

Swiss Ambassador to Germany
- Incumbent
- Assumed office 8 December 2023

Secretary of State of Switzerland
- In office 14 October 2020 – August 2023

Swiss Ambassador to France and Monaco
- In office 3 September 2018 – 14 October 2020

Personal details
- Born: Livia Leu; 1961 (age 64–65) Zürich, Switzerland
- Spouse: Donat Agosti
- Children: 2
- Education: Graduate Institute of International Studies
- Occupation: Attorney and diplomat

Livia Leu stylized Leu Agosti (/lɒɪ/;loy born 1961) is a Swiss attorney and diplomat. She currently serves as the State Secretary and EU-negotiator since 14 October 2020. Leu previously served as the Swiss Ambassador to Iran between 2009 and 2013. She was the first female from Europe to hold this position. From 2018 to 2020, she served as the Swiss Ambassador to France and Monaco, with residence at the Hôtel de Besenval. In December 2023, she succeeded Paul Seger as Ambassador to Germany.

== Early life and education ==
Leu was born in 1961 in Zürich, Switzerland however her parents hailed from Grisons. Her father was famed Swiss hotelier and restaurateur Hans C. Leu (1930-2017). She was primarily raised in Arosa, where she attended local schools. She completed her Matura in Chur and then studied Jurisprudence at University of Zürich and University of Lausanne graduating in 1989 with a Licentiate.

== Career ==
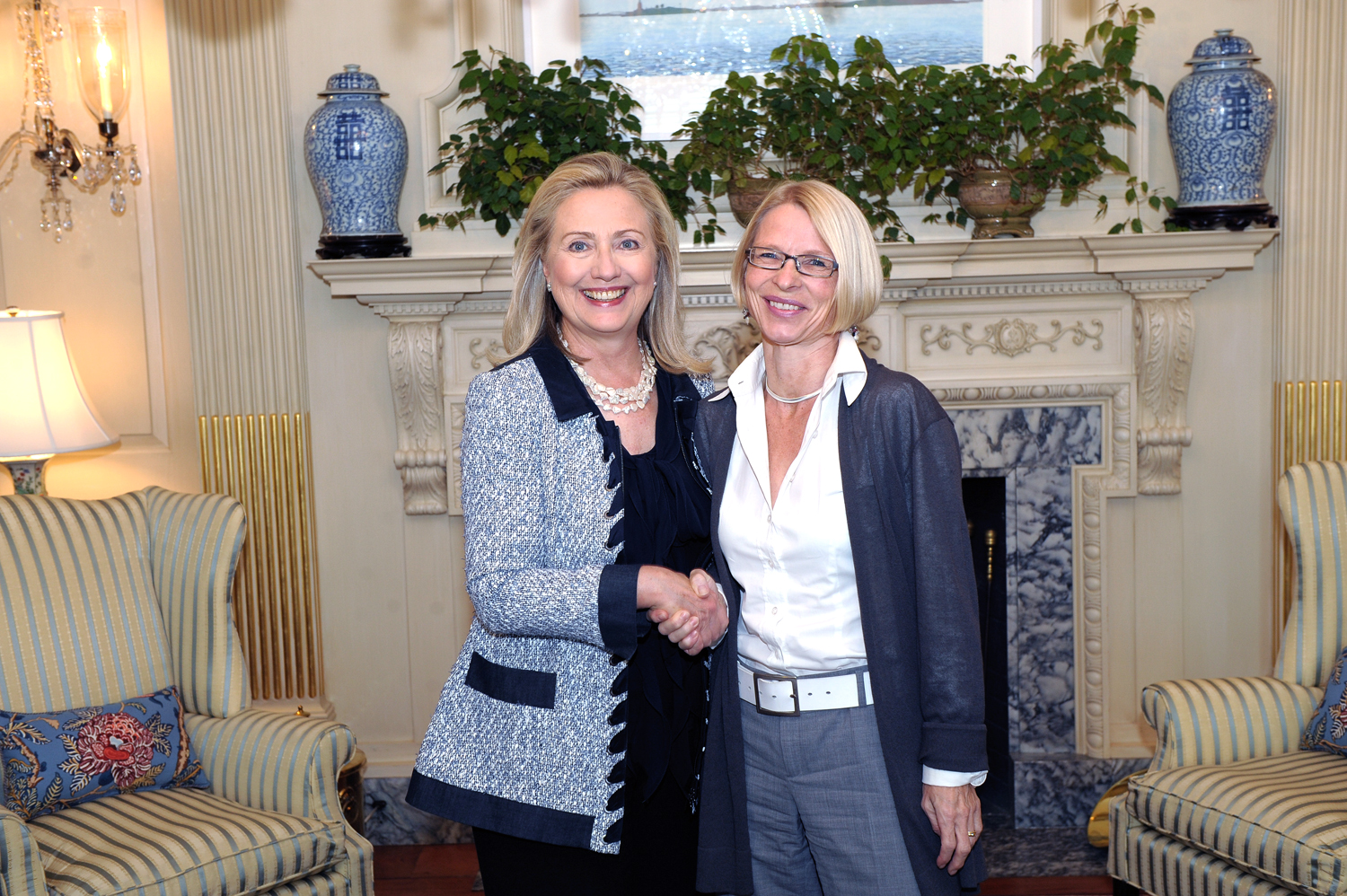
Leu Agosti meets with Secretary of State Hillary Clinton in 2011

In 1989, after graduating, Leu entered the Federal Department of Foreign Affairs and initially was employed as a trainee in Bern, Paris and Geneva. Since May 1991 she held the position as a diplomatic associate in the section United Nations/International Organizations. In 1994, she was transferred to the UN Headquarters in New York City, where she held the position of 2nd Embassy Secretary and was promoted to 1st Embassy Secretary in 1995 respectively to Embassy Counselor in 1998. Later she became vice chairman of the Swiss delegation in Cairo, and a member of the group responsible for dealing with the nuclear program of Iran.

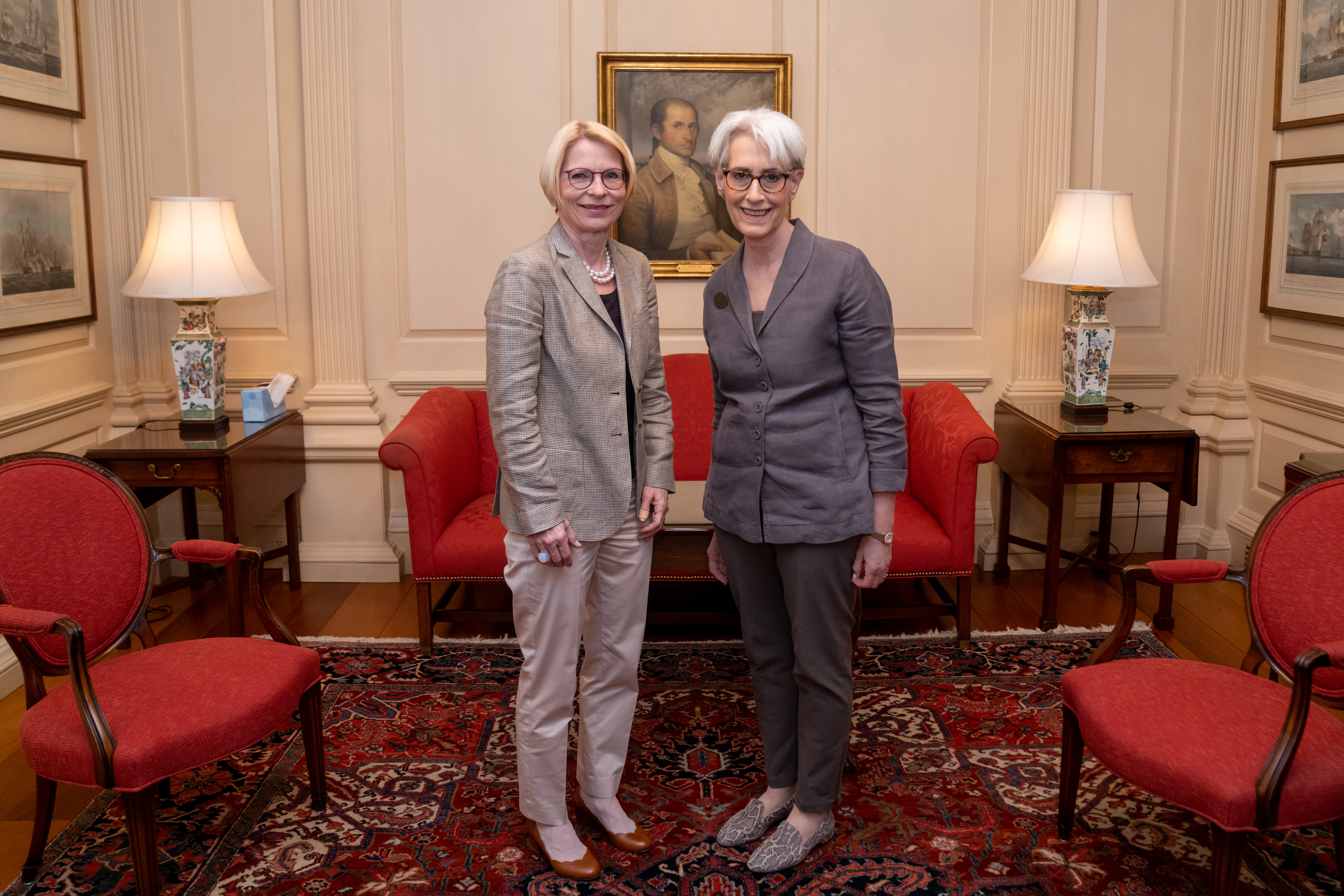
Leu Agosti meets with U.S. Deputy Secretary of State Wendy Sherman at the U.S. Department of State in Washington, D.C., in June 2021.

Before serving as the Ambassador to Iran, Agosti was the head of the African and European Department of the Ministry of Foreign Affairs of Switzerland. Leu Agosti, has brought her sons, along with her husband, to Iran.

Her husband, who is a biologist, an expert, and a researcher in the field of ants, is busy working in Iran. Before her departure, she announced that she would send her children to a German school in Iran. In 2018 she became the first woman to be the Swiss Ambassador to France and Monaco. She left her post on 14 October 2020.

In 2020, she was appointed State Secretary and EU-negotiator by the Swiss government. In 2023, it became public that she would be succeeding Paul Seger as Ambassador to Germany. On December 8, the President of Germany, Frank-Walter Steinmeier, formally received her letter of credence, officially making Leu Agosti the new Swiss Ambassador to Germany.

== Personal life ==
Leu is married to Donat Agosti, who is a myrmecologist. They have two sons.

== See also ==
- Iran–Switzerland relations
