= IPulse Medical =

Israeli femtech company

iPulse Medical
- Company type: Limited
- Industry: Wearable technology
- Founded: September 19, 2015; 10 years ago
- Founder: Chen Nachum
- Headquarters: Israel
- Products: Livia
- Website: www.mylivia.com

iPulse Medical is an Israeli start-up company that makes femtech products. The company's brand and main product, Livia, is a menstrual pain relief wearable device.

== History ==
iPulse Medical was founded by Israeli tech entrepreneur Chen Nachum in 2015. The idea for Livia came from his father, Zvi Nachum, a medical products inventor. In April 2016, The company launched Livia on crowdfunding site Indiegogo, where it had generated sales of $1,741,622 as of December 19, 2018. Livia was FDA cleared and used by women worldwide.

On April 11, 2018, the product received the Gold prize for Health & Wellness: Women's Wellbeing category at the Edison Awards.

== Technical ==
Livia is used during menstruation to eliminate cramps and pain. It employs the principle of gate control theory to organically block pain receptors by sending continuous electrical pulses through electrodes along the body's nerve pathways in order to block out the pain signals before they reach the central nervous system. This is done using a specific frequency and length of its electrical pulses, which block out the specific type of pain associated with menstruation. The device has undergone a clinical trial.
