= Agostino Giorgio Soldati =

Swiss lawyer and diplomat

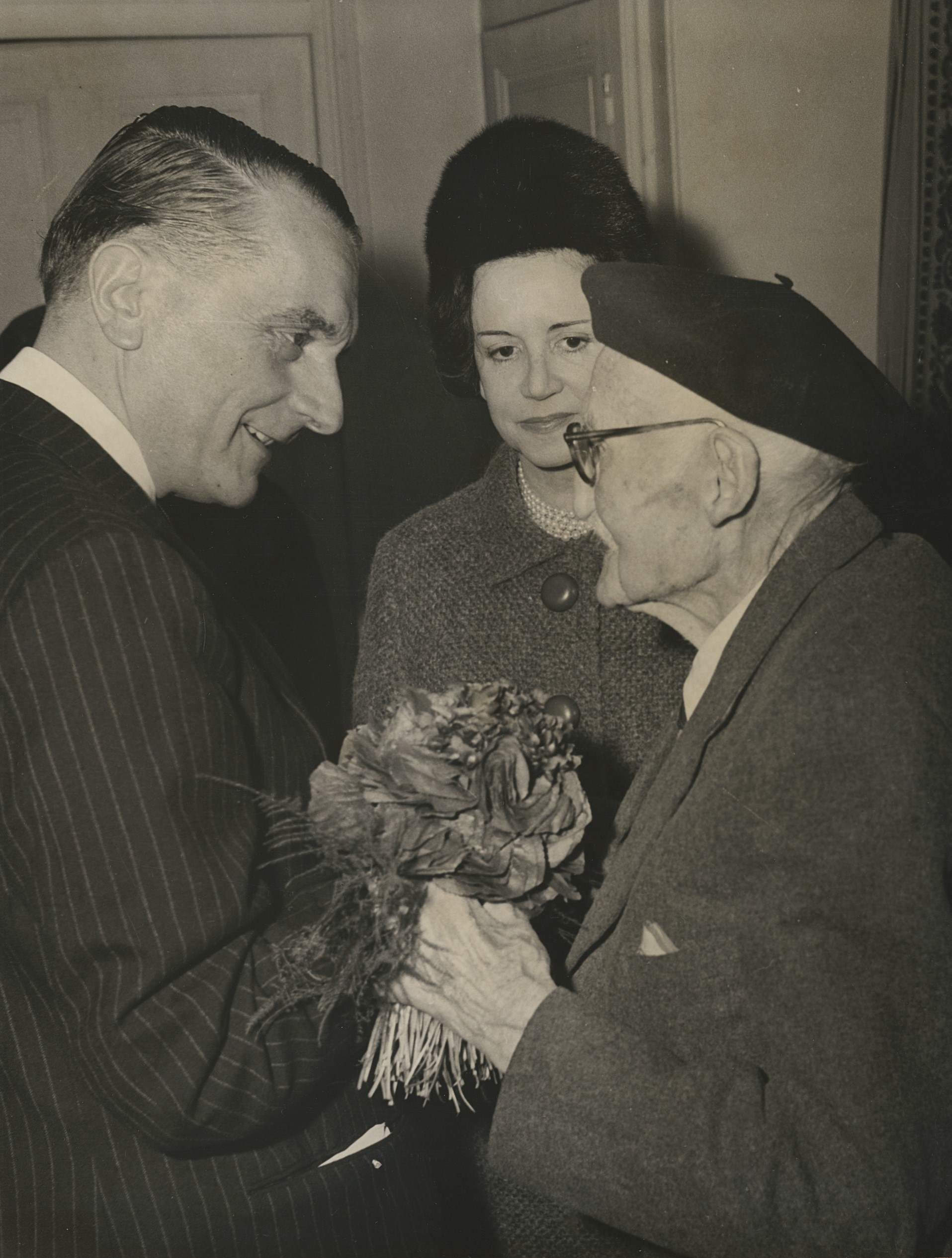
- Ambassador Agostino Giorgio Soldati (left) and his wife Marguerite Daisy Soldati-Thome, Comtesse de Contades, called Daisy, in conversation with Émile Monney on 13 January 1964 in Paris. Émile Monney celebrated his 105th birthday on that day. The ambassador and his wife hosted lavish parties and entertained on a grand scale: In Paris at the Hôtel de Besenval, in Switzerland at their country estate, the Château de Trévelin.
- Born: 17 November 1910; Buenos Aires, Argentina
- Died: 11 December 1966 (aged 56); Geneva, Switzerland
- Occupation: Diplomat
- Spouse(s): Marguerite Daisy Soldati-Thome, Comtesse de Contades, née Thome (1907–2001)
- Parent(s): Pio Soldati (1871–1934) and Maria Pia, née Balli
- Relatives: Francesco Balli (1852–1924) (grandfather)

Agostino Giorgio Soldati (1910–1966) was a Swiss lawyer, diplomat and Ambassador of the Swiss Confederation to France. His family originated from Neggio.

== Education, career and death ==
After attending school in Lugano and studying law in Milan, Vienna and Bern, where he received his doctorate in 1934, Agostino Giorgio Soldati joined the Federal Political Department (FPD) in 1938. As a young diplomat, he worked as a commissioner for economic affairs in Bern, Rom, Paris and Lisbon. From 1940 to 1944 he was posted to Berlin, where he represented the interests of 21 countries to the Third Reich.

=== New York, Paris and a château in Switzerland ===
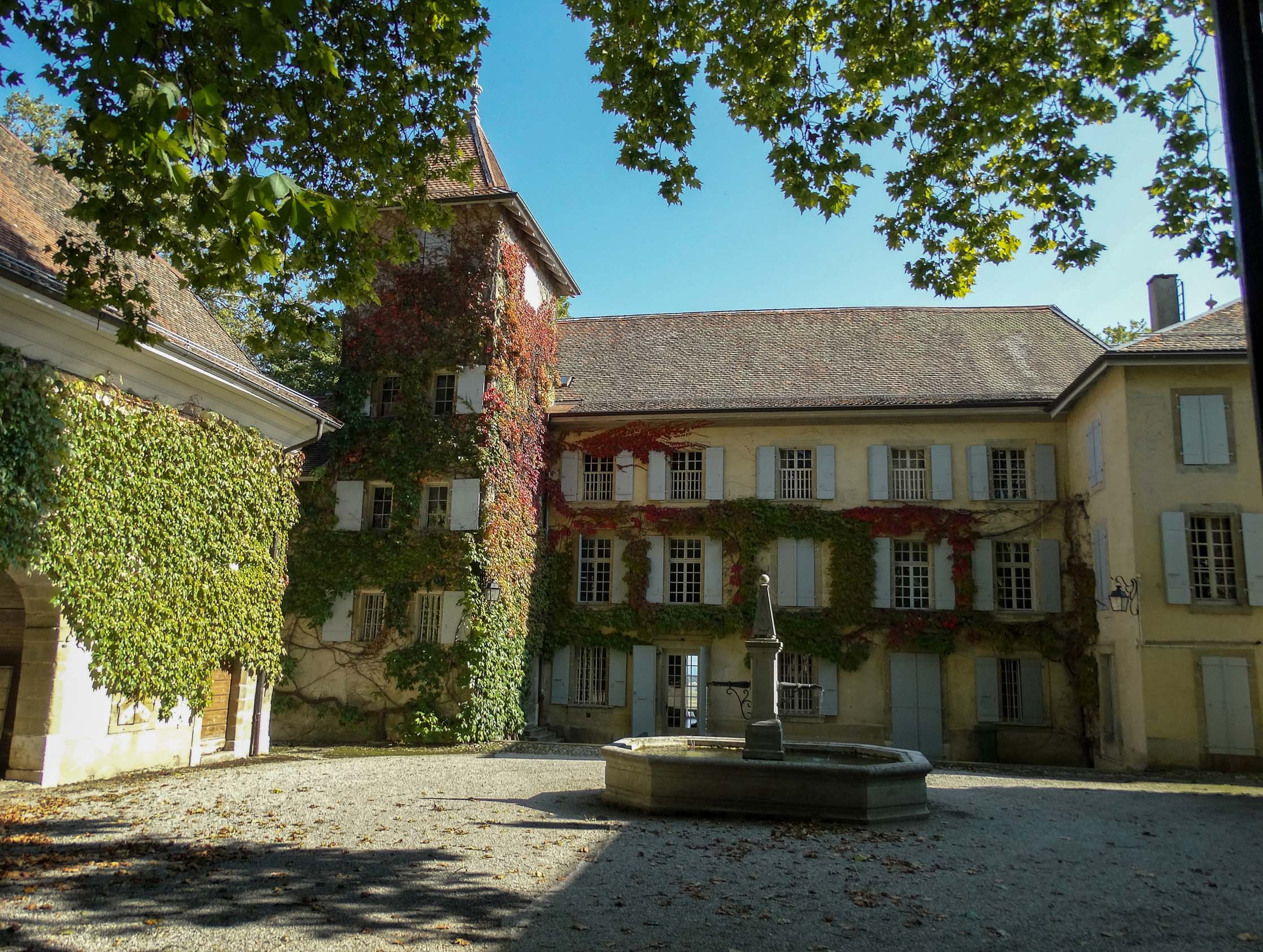
The Château de Trévelin in Aubonne, which Marguerite Daisy Soldati-Thome bought in 1958 with regard to her husband's representational obligations. She had bought the château by phone without seeing it while living in Paris.

In 1957, Agostino Giorgio Soldati was appointed observer to the United Nations in New York with the title of Minister Plenipotentiary. In 1958, he returned to Paris where he became the head of the Swiss delegation to the Organisation for Economic Co-operation and Development (OECD), with headquarters at 28 Rue de Martignac, just around the corner from the Hôtel de Besenval. In the same year, through the mediation of Dora von Salis, wife of the former Swiss envoy to France, Minister Peter Anton von Salis (1898–1982), Marguerite Daisy Soldati-Thome, Comtesse de Contades, wife of Agostino Giorgio Soldati, purchased the Château de Trévelin in Aubonne from the banker Édouard Bordier (1874–1957), partner of Bordier & Cie, and, after his death during the transaction, from his heirs, respectively. According to oral tradition, Marguerite Daisy Soldati-Thome bought the château unseen, only on the basis of the oral telephone descriptions of Dora von Salis, who lived nearby in Mont-sur-Rolle. In addition to personalities from Switzerland, it was above all the French high society who met at the Château de Trévelin, including Alain Poher and René Pleven.

In 1959, Agostino Giorgio Soldati was already a delegate to the European Coal and Steel Community (ECSC), he was accredited as the first ambassador to the European Economic Community (EEC) and the European Atomic Energy Community (EAEC or EURATOM) in Brussels, with residence in Paris.

==== Ambassador to France ====
In 1961, Agostino Giorgio Soldati was appointed ambassador to France, with residence at the Hôtel de Besenval. He presented his lettres de créance to President Charles de Gaulle on 25 September of the same year.

=== His last participation in the annual Swiss Ambassadors Conference: The legacy ===
At the last conference of the Swiss ambassadors in which he took part in September 1966, Agostino Giorgio Soldati declared: "A country's credit and weight in the world are measured not by the abundance of its initiatives and declarations, but by the seriousness they command and by the real consequences they entail."

=== Death in office ===
Agostino Giorgio Soldati, who was extremely popular and well connected in Parisian society, died in office in 1966 at the age of fifty-six after serving five years in the French capital. He passed away in a hospital in Geneva. On the day of his death, President Charles de Gaulle sent a telegram of condolence to the President of the Swiss Confederation, Hans Schaffner, which he signed with "Le Général de Gaulle". Charles de Gaulle also sent a personal letter of condolence, dated 11 December 1966, to the widow Marguerite Daisy Soldati-Thome, Comtesse de Contades (1907–2001), called Daisy. This letter he signed with "Charles de Gaulle". Pierre Micheli (1905–1989), the Secretary General of the Federal Political Department (FPD), wrote in his article in the Journal de Genève: "He was endowed with a wide education, a deep knowledge of facts and men and with a mind of unfailing alertness."

"I shall not forget – be assured of it – the great ambassador and friend of France that Monsieur Soldati was. His intellectual and moral qualities guaranteed him, in the post he held for more than five years, a success beyond dispute."

— General Charles de Gaulle, Président de la République Française, excerpt from the letter of condolence to the widow in memory of Ambassador Agostino Giorgio Soldati

== Private life ==
Since 1958, Agostino Giorgio Soldati was married to the rich and influential socialite Marguerite Daisy Soldati-Thome, Comtesse de Contades (1907–2001). She had two daughters from her first marriage to André Marie Artur Aymard, Comte de Contades (1900–1958). Marguerite Daisy Soldati-Thome was the daughter of André Thome and the sister of Jacqueline Thome-Patenôtre.

== Publications (partial list) ==
- La responsabilité des États dans le droit international, Éditions Duchemin, Paris, 1934
