= Livia aurea =

Scientific classification
- Kingdom: Fungi
- Division: Ascomycota
- Class: Leotiomycetes
- Order: Helotiales
- Family: incertae sedis
- Genus: Livia; Velen.
- Species: L. aurea

Binomial name
- Livia aurea Velen.

Species of fungus

Livia is a genus of fungi in the order Helotiales. The relationship of this taxon to other taxa within the order is unknown (incertae sedis), and it has not yet been placed with certainty into any family. This is a monotypic genus, containing the single species Livia aurea.
