= Monsieur des Lourdines =

- Directed by: Pierre de Hérain
- Written by: André Obey; Alphonse de Chateaubriant (novel)
- Produced by: Raymond Borderie
- Starring: Raymond Rouleau; Germaine Dermoz; Mila Parély
- Cinematography: Philippe Agostini
- Edited by: Henriette Wurtzer
- Music by: Marcel Delannoy
- Production company: Pathé Consortium Cinéma
- Distributed by: Pathé Consortium Cinéma
- Release date: 9 June 1943
- Running time: 109 minutes
- Country: France
- Language: French

Monsieur des Lourdines is a 1943 French historical drama film directed by Pierre de Hérain and starring Raymond Rouleau, Germaine Dermoz and Mila Parély. It was shot at the Saint-Maurice Studios in Paris. The film's sets were designed by the art director Lucien Aguettand. It is an adaptation of Alphonse de Chateaubriant's 1911 novel of the same title. The film's director was the stepson of Marshal Pétain and its themes are supportive of Vichyite policy.

== Synopsis ==
A young man from an aristocratic family tires of the country life and moves to Paris where he squanders his inheritance. Returning to his home with remorse, he reconciles with his father and becomes engaged to his true love.

== Cast ==
- Raymond Rouleau as Anthime des Lourdines
- Germaine Dermoz as Madame des Lourdines
- Mila Parély as Nelly
- Constant Rémy as Monsieur des Lourdines
- Jacques Varennes as La Marzelière
- Jean Debucourt as Le docteur
- Louis Salou as Muller
- Pierre Jourdan as Flibure
- Jacques Castelot as Le prince Stimov
- Robert Dhéry as Désiré
- Camille Guérini as Nestor
- Jeanne Fusier-Gir as Perrette
- Paul Faivre as Célestin
- Madeleine Suffel as Julie
- André Carnège as Le notaire
- Janine Clairville as Estelle
- Bonneval
- Julien Carette as Albert
- Claude Génia as Sylvie

== Bibliography ==
- Butler, Margaret. Film and Community in Britain and France: From La Règle Du Jeu to Room at the Top. I.B.Tauris, 2004.
