= Ernest Fornairon =

Ernest Fornairon (4 February 1899, Montpellier – 13 December 1968) was a French writer, former general secretary of the Groupe Collaboration led by Alphonse de Châteaubriant.

== Bibliography ==
- La Duchesse de Berry, La Vie amoureuse,
- Complet de la flagorneuse, poèmes, 1928, Mercure de Flandre
- Palmyre, 1930
- Les Belles Filles du Château Vert, 1930
- Félicie, roman, 1931, Mercure de Flandre
- Une femme qui tombe, 1933
- Voyage chez les humoristes français, 1934
- Le Mystère de madame Lafarge, from the film L'Affaire Lafarge (1938), directed by Pierre Chenal
- Le Mystère de la Chavonnière, 1941
- René Madec : Le Mousse devenu nabab, 1942
- Les Dieux du Rhin, 1943
- Ces dames de Chamblas, 1943
- Le Mystère cathare

With Germain Fried, aux éditions Tallandier :

- Le Looping de la mort, novel, 1929 (from a film)
- Mascarade d'amour, 1930 (from a film)
- Anny… de Montparnasse, novel, 1930
- Anny, je t'aime !, 1931 (from a film)
- Le Mystère du pôle, 1931 (from a film)
- Danseurs de cordes, 1931 (from a film)
- Vive l'amour !, novel, 1931 (from a film)

With Léo Joannon :

- La République des jeunes filles, 1929
- Le Souffle du désert, novel, 1931 (from film)
- La Grâce, roman, 1932 (from a film)
- Au service du tzar, novel, 1932, Sofar-Location (from a film)
- S.O.S., roman, 1932, Sofar-Location (from a film by Carmine Gallone)
- Un amour dans le désert, 1933

With Jean Weilland and René Pichard du Page :

- Pourquoi nous croyons en la collaboration : Speech given on 27 Décembre 1940 at Salle Gaveau, Paris, 1940
