= Hardon =

Hardon is a surname. Notable people with the surname include:

- Eugénie Petain (née Hardon), wife of Maréchal Petain, president of Vichy France
- John Hardon (1914–2000), Jesuit priest, writer, and theologian
- Thomas Hardon (1921–present), Australian artist

== See also ==
- Hadron, a type of composite particle in physics
- Hard-Ons, an Australian punk rock band
- Erection of the penis, colloquially called a "hard-on"
