= Abel Bonnard =

French writer, poet and politician (1883–1968)

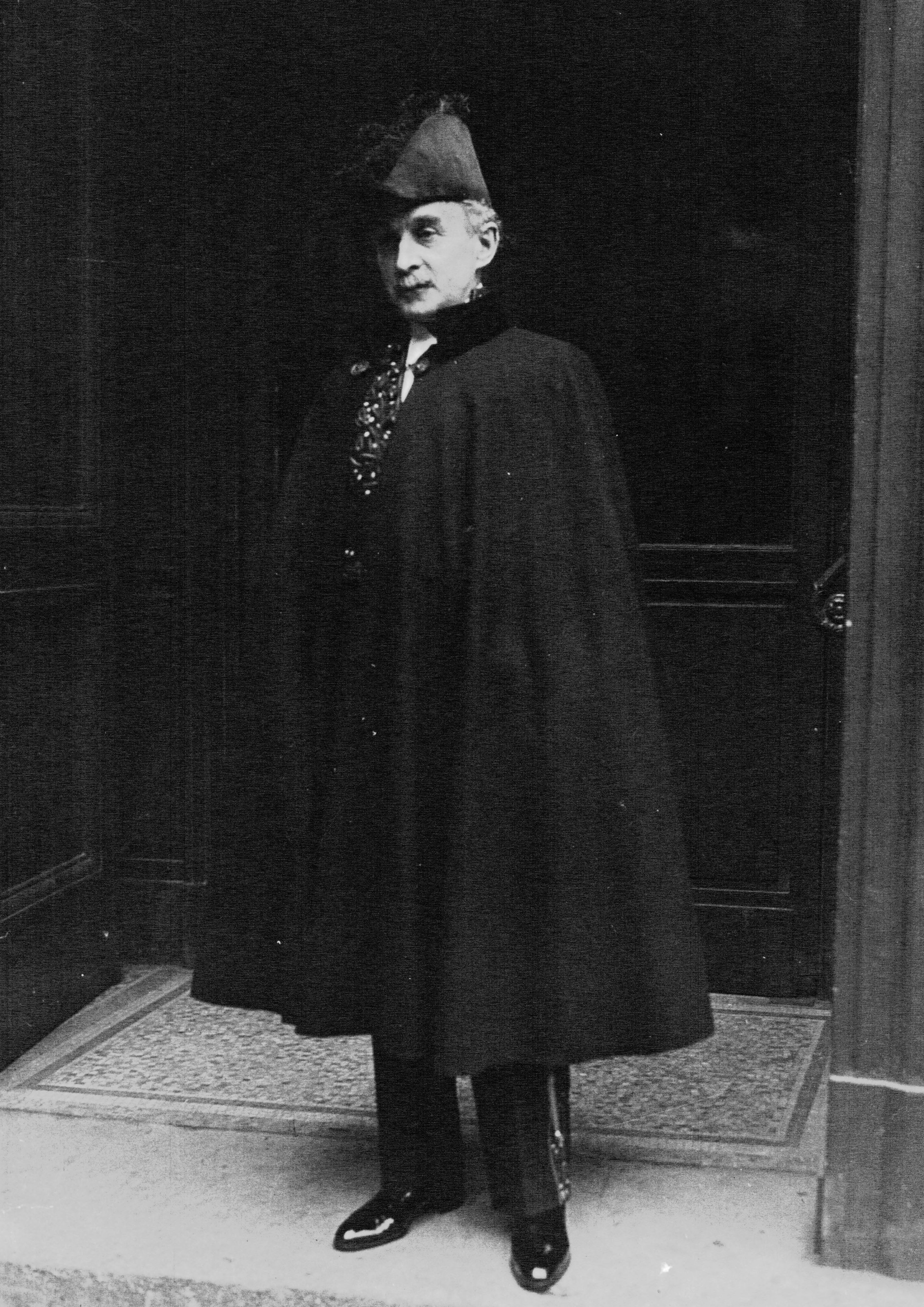
- Abel Bonnard in his Académie française uniform in 1933.

Minister of National Education
- In office 25 February 1942 – 20 August 1944
- Prime Minister: François Darlan; Pierre Laval
- Preceded by: Jérôme Carcopino
- Succeeded by: René Capitant

Member of the Paris Municipal Council
- In office 16 December 1942 – 20 August 1944
- Constituency: 16th arrondissement

Member of the National Council
- In office 24 January 1941 – 20 August 1944
- Appointed by: Philippe Pétain
- Constituency: At-large

Personal details
- Born: 19 December 1883 Poitiers, Vienne, France
- Died: 31 May 1968 (aged 84) Madrid, Spain
- Party: French Popular Party (1937–1941); Groupe Collaboration (1941–1944)
- Education: University of Paris
- Profession: Writer; Journalist
- Writing career
- Period: 20th century
- Genres: Autobiography, essay, novel
- Notable awards: Concours général (1900); GPLAF (1924)
- Movement: Symbolism

Abel Jean Désiré Bonnard (French pronunciation: [abɛl ʒɑ̃ deziʁe bɔnaʁ]; 19 December 1883 – 31 May 1968) was a French poet, novelist and politician. One of the ministers of National Education under the Vichy regime, he was tried and convicted for collaborating with Nazi Germany.

== Biography ==
Born in Poitiers, Vienne, his early education was in Marseille with secondary studies at the Lycée Louis-le-Grand in Paris. A student of literature, he was a graduate of the École du Louvre.

Politically, a follower of Charles Maurras, his views evolved towards fascism in the 1930s. Bonnard was one of the ministers of National Education under the Vichy regime (1942–44). The political satirist Jean Galtier-Boissière gave him the nickname "la Gestapette," a portmanteau of Gestapo and tapette, the latter a pejorative French slang term for homosexual. The name, along with the homosexual inclinations it implied, became well known. He was a member of the committee of the Groupe Collaboration, an organisation that aimed to encourage closer cultural ties between France and Germany.

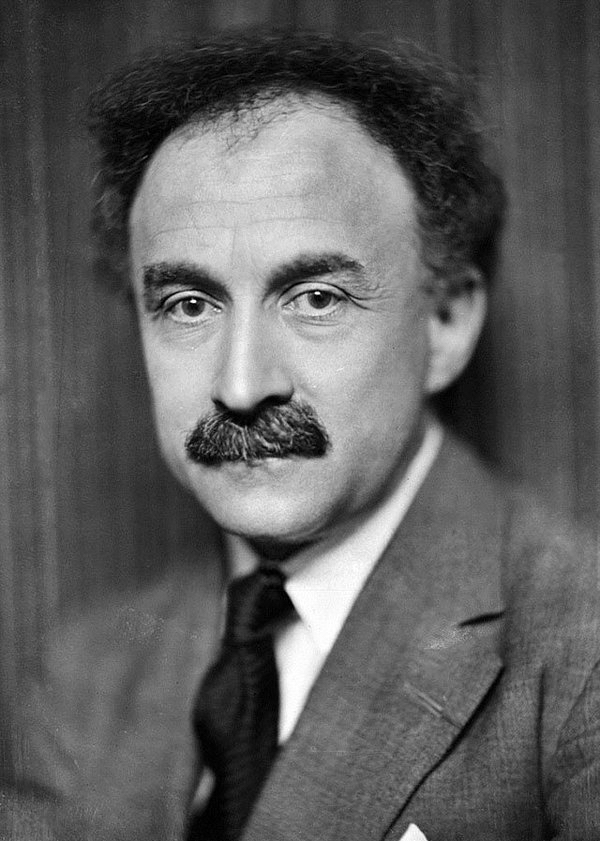
Abel Bonnard in 1930

Bonnard was one of four members expelled from the Académie française after World War II for collaboration with Germany. Bonnard was condemned in absentia to death during the épuration légale period for wartime activities. However, he had escaped to Spain where Francisco Franco granted him political asylum.

In 1960, he returned to France to face retrial for his crimes. Bonnard received a symbolic sentence of 10 years banishment to be counted from 1945, but dissatisfied with the verdict, he chose to return to Spain where he lived out the remainder of his life.

== Bibliography ==
- 1906 Les Familiers
- 1908 Les Histoires
- 1908 Les Royautés
- 1913 La Vie et l'Amour
- 1914 Le Palais Palmacamini
- 1918 La France et ses morts
- 1924 Notes de voyage : En Chine (1920-1921), 2 vol.
- 1926 Éloge de l'ignorance
- 1926 La vie amoureuse d'Henri Beyle
- 1927 L'Enfance
- 1928 L'Amitié
- 1928 L'Argent
- 1929 Saint François d'Assise
- 1931 Rome
- 1936 Le drame du présent : Les Modérés
- 1937 Savoir aimer
- 1939 L'Amour et l'Amitié
- 1941 Pensées dans l'action
- 1992 Ce monde et moi (selection of aphorisms, posthumous)

== Honours ==
- Officier of the Order of the Legion of Honour (1919, stripped in 1945)
- Croix de guerre 1914-1918
