= Saint-Loup (writer) =

Fascist, writer

- Born: Marc Augier; 19 March 1908; Bordeaux, Aquitaine
- Died: 16 December 1990 (aged 82); Paris, Île-de-France
- Occupation: Writer

Marc Augier (French pronunciation: [maʁk oʒje]; 19 March 1908 – 16 December 1990), better known by the pen name Saint-Loup (pronounced [sɛ̃ lu]), was a French author, journalist, political activist and mountaineer. Initially a left-wing anti-capitalist, Marc Augier later turned into fascist and became a supporter of Nazi Germany. During the German occupation of France in World War II, he was an enthusiastic collaborator and enlisted in the Legion of French Volunteers Against Bolshevism before joining the Waffen-SS. He was sentenced to death after the war, but managed to escape and was later pardoned. He re-emerged under the alias Saint-Loup and published various books retelling his war experiences and expressing his neo-pagan views.

== Early years ==
Augier's earliest direct political involvement began in the Republican-Socialist Party, although the main focus of his youthful energies was the Centre laïc des auberges, a non-political group central to the development of youth hostels in France. Although its leader Jean Giono was not a fascist, it was Augier's fascination with Giono's primitivism that eventually led the young Augier to adopt that ideology. He was also a supporter of paganism against Christian "decadence".

== Collaboration ==
Augier formed his own group, the Les Jeunes de l'Europe Nouvelle, in 1941, attracting 4000 members and affiliating to the Groupe Collaboration. He became associated with the Breton nationalist Alphonse de Châteaubriant, a leading figure in the Groupe, and was for a time business manager of his journal La Gerbe.

Augier then joined the political bureau of Jacques Doriot's French Popular Party (PPF). He enlisted in the Legion of French Volunteers Against Bolshevism and served on the Eastern Front whilst also launching and editing the group's paper Le Combattant Européen. He served in both the LVF and the French Waffen SS as a war correspondent. He was also responsible for the French Waffen SS' official organ, Devenir ("To become" or "Becoming"). However Augier, who still supported economic socialism and hoped that Nazism would take seriously the 'socialism' part of its name, grew disillusioned by the distinct lack of anti-capitalism amongst the SS men with whom he served.

== Post-war writing ==
In 1945 he went underground and published Face Nord ("North Face") under the pen name M-A de Saint-Loup to pay for his passage to Argentina. The book had some success in France. In Argentina he acted as a technical adviser to Juan Perón and also enlisted in the Argentine Army, attaining the rank of lieutenant-colonel. He also acted as Eva Peron's ski instructor.

He was pardoned and returned to France in 1953. Once back in France he published La Nuit commence au Cap Horn ("The Night begins in Cap Horn") as Saint-Loup. He may have won the prestigious Prix Goncourt for the book but Le Figaro Littéraire exposed Augier as the true author. Of the entire jury only Colette refused to retract her vote for Saint-Loup during the ensuing uproar.

Saint-Loup continued to work as an author and journalist, writing several books about the LVF (Les Volontaires; "The Volunteers") and both the French (Les Hérétiques; "The Heretics", Les Nostalgiques; "The Nostalgics") and Belgian Waffen SS (Les SS de la Toison d'or; "The SS of the Golden Fleece"). In Les voiliers fantômes d'Hitler, Saint Loup describes the voyages of Abwehr-controlled sailing boats to places like Brasil, South Africa and Argentina during World War II, including the landing and exfiltration of agentes in the southern beaches of Mar del Plata as late as July 1944. His writing was marked by a pursuit of adventure, the desire to surpass the self and an antipathy to Christian philosophy. He was an apologist for the foreign SS volunteers with whom he had served. He published several works about regionalist movements and about man's struggle to survive in wild and savage environments. He was also fascinated by cars and motorised transport and wrote biographies of Louis Renault and Marius Berliet. His last novel, La République du Mont-Blanc ("The Republic of Mont-Blanc"), published in 1982, was about the survival of a small Savoyard community that took refuge on the mountain to escape intermixing and decadence.

Saint-Loup influenced certain neo-pagan and far-right authors such as Pierre Vial and Jean Mabire.

== Later years ==
Following his return to France where he worked closely with René Binet whilst also acting as president of Dominique Venner's Comité France-Rhodesia. He was featured heavily in France's far right journals until his death. He continues to be quoted and translated in far-right circles long after his death.
