= Pierre de Hérain =

French film director

- Born: Pierre Paul Henri Déhérain; 24 July 1904; Avilly-Saint-Léonard, Oise, France
- Died: 25 September 1972 (aged 68); Paris, France
- Occupation: Film director
- Parent(s): François de Hérain; Eugénie Hardon
- Relatives: Pierre Paul Dehérain (paternal grandfather); Philippe Pétain (stepfather)

Pierre de Hérain (24 July 1904 – 25 September 1972) was a French film director. de Hérain was born as Pierre Déhérain on 24 July 1904 in Avilly-Saint-Léonard, Oise, France. His father, François de Hérain, was a painter. His mother, Eugénie Hardon, later married Marshal Philippe Pétain, who became his stepfather. De Hérain began his career in film as an assistant director of Itto, a 1934 film directed by Jean Benoît-Lévy and Marie Epstein. In 1935, he was an assistant director to Divine, directed by Max Ophüls. In 1938, he was an assistant director of Monsieur Coccinelle, directed by Dominique Bernard-Deschamps. De Hérain directed five films in the 1940s. One of them, Monsieur des Lourdines, was based on a novel by Alphonse de Châteaubriant. De Hérain died on 25 September 1972 in Paris.

== Filmography ==
- Monsieur des Lourdines (1943)
- Pamela (1945)
- Love Around the House (1947)
- The Murdered Model (1948)
- Marlene (1949)
