= La Gerbe =

- Type: Weekly newspaper
- Owner: Alphonse de Châteaubriant
- Editor-in-chief: Marc Augier
- Founded: July 1940
- Ceased publication: August 1944
- Political alignment: Collaborationism
- Language: French
- Headquarters: Paris

La Gerbe (French pronunciation: [la ʒɛʁb], The Sheaf) was a weekly newspaper of the French collaboration with Nazi Germany during World War II that appeared in Paris from July 1940 till August 1944. Its political-literary line was modeled after Candide and Gringoire, two right-wing newspapers founded in the interwar period.

Founder and editor was the writer Alphonse de Châteaubriant, and chief editor was Marc Augier. Also involved in the management was the German journalist Eitel Moellhausen, who wrote under the pen names Aimé Cassar and Pierre Cousinery. Gabrielle Storms-Castelot, the mother of André Castelot and mistress of Châteaubriant, was the director's secretary.

The first issue of La Gerbe, announced by a huge poster campaign in Paris, consisted of only four pages. But within three months the publication's size had reached ten pages and its circulation 100,000. In 1943, it sold 140,000 copies.

The newspaper's title was taken from Châteaubriant's 1937 naively pro-Hitler book La gerbe des forces. But it also alluded to the position it advanced: France, destined to be an agrarian country, should become a part of the new Europe created by Hitler. Violently anticommunist, antirepublican and antisemitic, and hostile to the Popular Front, the newspaper drew its ideology from Fascism and more particularly from Nazism.

According to La Gerbe, the country had to undergo a "national alignment" and had to fight with all its strength against individualism. Châteaubriant's vision of Hitler was that he would form a unified Catholic Europe, as it last existed under Charlemagne.

Openly eugenic and racist, the newspaper made its columns available to Georges Montandon, and declared in its edition of 7 November 1940: "The time has come to say that Apollo and Pallas Athena are the images of the Nordic man and the Nordic woman, an affirmation that was impossible at the time of the Jewish conspiracy."

Like its founder, La Gerbe synthesized Catholicism and racism. The newspaper demanded that the mass should accentuate what would bring it closer to a racist ceremony (21 November 1940) and asked: "Joy, said Father Janvier in one of his talks, is the motor of life. Did Hitler say otherwise when he said 'Kraft durch Freude' [i.e. Strength Through Joy]?"

Strongly pro-Nazi intellectuals writing for the newspaper included Drieu La Rochelle, Louis-Ferdinand Céline and Robert Brasillach. Other writers were the pro-Nazi Henry de Montherlant, Jean Giono, and the more ambiguous Marcel Aymé, Jean Anouilh and Colette. Further contributors included Paul Morand, Lucien Combelle and André Castelot, who was in charge of the theatre reviews. It was closely associated with the Groupe Collaboration, an initiative established by Châteaubriand in September 1940.

La Gerbe was subsidized, and in some sense created, by the German embassy, with Châteaubriant serving as a front for the ambassador Otto Abetz. As the only French newspaper created by the German occupants, it was meant to replace Candide and Gringoire. Some of the newspaper's last editorials referred to the Allied bombings as terrorism. After the Liberation of Paris the police searched the offices of La Gerbe in Rue Chauchat, which were then taken over by a newspaper of the French Resistance.

== See also ==
- Vichy France
