= Germain Fried =

- Born: 15 March 1905; Dvinsk Russian Empire
- Died: 27 November 1963 (aged 58); Annecy, Haute-Savoie

Baruch Fried, known as Germain Fried (15 March 1905 – 27 November 1963) was a French writer, film editor, film director and scriptwriter.

He coauthored several books with Ernest Fornairon.

== Filmography ==
Film editor

- 1931: Paris Béguin by Augusto Genina (with Jean Gabin and Fernandel)
- 1931: Grock by Carl Boese and Joë Hamman

Assistant director

- 1933: Paprika by Jean de Limur

Film director

- 1932: Une faim de loup
- 1933: Honeymoon Trip, codirected for the French version with Erich Schmidt and Joe May
- 1934: L'École des resquilleurs
- 1934: Ces messieurs de la noce
- 1935: Quadrille d'amour codirected with Richard Eichberg
- 1935: Tovaritch codirected with Jacques Deval
- 1936: Feu la mère de madame (film)

Scriptwriter

- 1937: The Kings of Sport by Pierre Colombier
- 1938: Grisou by Maurice de Canonge

== Bibliography ==
With Ernest Fornairon at Librairie Jules Tallandier:

- 1929: Le Looping de la mort, novelization of Looping the Loop by Arthur Robison (1928)
- 1930: Mascarade d'amour, novelization of Love's Masquerade by Augusto Genina (1928)
- 1930: Anny de Montparnasse, novelization of Sinful and Sweet by Karl Lamac (1929)
- 1931: Anny, je t'aime, novelization of The Caviar Princess by Karl Lamac (1929)
- 1931: Le Mystère du Pôle, novelization of The Call of the North by Nunzio Malasomma and Mario Bonnard (1929)
- 1931: Danseurs de cordes, novelization of Katharina Knie by Karl Grune (1930)
- 1931: Vive l'amour!, novelization of Good News by Nick Grinde (1930)
