= François de Hérain =

French painter, sculptor and engraver (1877–1962)

- Born: 10 November 1877; Paris, France
- Died: 28 May 1962 (aged 84); Paris, France
- Occupations: Painter, sculptor, engraver
- Spouse: Eugénie Hardon
- Children: Pierre de Hérain
- Parent: Pierre Paul Dehérain

François de Hérain (10 November 1877 – 28 May 1962) was a French painter, sculptor and engraver who had initially worked as a doctor. He did many paintings of scenes in French Algeria and Morocco and authored several art books. He won the Prix Charles Blanc from the Académie française for Peintres et sculpteurs écrivains d’art in 1961. His wife, Eugénie Hardon, later married Marshal Philippe Pétain.

He lived in Paris and Les Baux de Provence, where a square, Place François de Hérain, was named in his honour.
