= Honeymoon Trip =

1933 Austrian-French film

- Directed by: Germain Fried; Erich Schmidt
- Written by: Jean Boyer; Gustav Holm; Ernst Marischka; Karl Meinhardt
- Produced by: Romain Pinès
- Starring: Brigitte Helm; Albert Préjean; Jacqueline Made
- Cinematography: Jean Bachelet[Max Nekut
- Edited by: Marc Sorkin
- Music by: Walter Jurmann; Bronislau Kaper
- Production companies: Films Romain Pinès; Societé Internationale Cinématographique
- Release date: 6 January 1933
- Countries: Austria; France
- Language: French

Honeymoon Trip (French: Voyage de noces) is a 1933 Austrian-French comedy film directed by Germain Fried, Joe May and Erich Schmidt. It stars Brigitte Helm, Albert Préjean and Jacqueline Made. A separate German-language film Three on a Honeymoon was also made and released a week earlier (on 29 December 1932).

The film's sets were designed by Artur Berger.

== Cast ==
- Brigitte Helm as Anita Paglione
- Albert Préjean as Henri Keller
- Jacqueline Made as Jacqueline Lenner
- Pierre Brasseur as Rudi
- Danielle Darrieux
- Jim Gérald
- Henri Kerny
- Charles Lamy
- Georges Saillard

== Bibliography ==
- Bock, Hans-Michael & Bergfelder, Tim. The Concise Cinegraph: Encyclopaedia of German Cinema. Berghahn Books, 2009.
