= Groupe Collaboration =

- President: Alphonse de Châteaubriant
- General Secretary: Ernest Fornairon
- Founded: 1941
- Dissolved: 1944
- Headquarters: Vichy
- Youth wing: Jeunes de l’Europe nouvelle
- Ideology: Révolution nationale Germanophilia; Pan-Europeanism
- Political position: Far-right

The Groupe Collaboration was a French collaborationist group active during the Second World War. Largely eschewing the street politics of many such contemporary groups, it sought to establish cultural links with Nazi Germany and to appeal to the higher echelons of French life. It promoted a "Europeanist" outlook and sought the rebirth of France as part of a pan-European "National Revolution".

== Development ==
The Groupe was a revival of the Comité France-Allemagne, established in September 1940 by Fernand de Brinon. It eschewed political party status and instead worked towards cultural collaboration with the Germans. To this end it adopted a largely conservative approach and focused on such activities as hosting discussion circles and publishing two journals - La Gerbe and L'Union Francaise. The initiative had the support of Otto Abetz and was at least partially supported financially by German money.

It was divided into sections based on the pursuits it endorsed with science, economics, literature and law wings, as well as an arts section which included drama, music and visual arts sections. Max d'Ollone served as president of the music section and in this role he was expected to organise gala events to celebrate the visits of German dignitaries to Paris. An exhibition by German sculptor and active Nazi Arno Breker in Paris was organised under the auspices of the Groupe, an event that became a source of much controversy in the post-Liberation era. It also broadcast a weekly radio show in Paris.

Its headquarters were in Paris, although the Groupe was permitted to organise in both Vichy France and the occupied zone. By 1943 it could claim 26,000 members in the occupied zone and 12,000 in the Vichy zone, with some 200,000 people attending its events. Many of its members were not otherwise active in political movements.

Alphonse de Chateaubriant, the 1911 Prix Goncourt winner, presided over the group, whilst its governing committee included Abel Bonnard and Cardinal Alfred-Henri-Marie Baudrillart among its membership. Pierre Benoit, Georges Claude and Pierre Drieu La Rochelle were among the other prominent figures to sit on the committee, along with Robert Brasillach, Jacques Chardonne and Paul Belmondo.

== Relationship to other groups ==
A youth movement, Jeunes de l'Europe nouvelle (JEN), was attached to the Groupe, although it was somewhat more stridently active than its sedate parent organisation. Led by Jacques Schweizer, the former leader of the youth section of the Jeunesses Patriotes, it was active in promoting pro-collaboration propaganda campaigns. The JEN slightly pre-dated the Groupe, having initially been established by Saint-Loup before affiliating to the Groupe.

In 1942 the Groupe lent its support to the Front révolutionnaire national, an initiative established by Marcel Déat as an attempt to realise his dream of forging a single mass party in support of collaborationism. The idea was not a success after a number of groups, including the influential French Popular Party (PPF), refused to support the initiative. Despite this a number of leading PPF members were also active in the Groupe itself. For his part Déat saw the Groupe as vital for portraying a positive image of Germany in order to lessen the negative perceptions of occupation and collaborationism.

== Decline ==
The group went into steep decline in the latter stages of the war as the tide began to turn against Germany. Following the Liberation membership of the Groupe Collaboration was defined as a basis for a judgement of Indignité nationale against any individual member.
