= Love Around the House =

1947 film

- Directed by: Pierre de Hérain
- Written by: Simon Gantillon; Roger Leenhardt
- Based on: Love Around the House by Albert t'Serstevens
- Produced by: Jacques Cohen; Robert Lussac
- Starring: Pierre Brasseur; María Casares; Julien Carette
- Cinematography: Maurice Pecqueux
- Edited by: Henriette Wurtzer
- Music by: Joseph Kosma
- Production companies: Etendard Films; Productions Internationales Cinématographiques
- Distributed by: Eclair Journal
- Release date: 8 August 1947
- Running time: 100 minutes
- Countries: France; Belgium
- Language: French

Love Around the House (French: L'amour autour de la maison) is a 1947 French-Belgian drama film directed by Pierre de Hérain and starring Pierre Brasseur, María Casares and Julien Carette. It was shot at the Billancourt Studios in Paris and on location around Finistère. The film's sets were designed by the art director Alexandre Arnstam.

== Synopsis ==
Two sisters live in an isolated house in the countryside of Brittany where the lonely life leads to jealousy and ultimately a death.

== Cast ==
- Pierre Brasseur as Douze Apôtres - le braconnier
- María Casares as Thérèse
- Claude Larue as Nicole
- Julien Carette as Le père Jus
- Serge Andréguy as Bernard
- Jean Crédoz as Le garde
- Paul Faivre as Albert
- Micheline Gilbert as Paulette
- Jean Heuzé as Norière
- Palmyre Levasseur as Madame Le Moal
- Robert Lussac as Le docteur Coulon
- Jane Marken as Madame Jobic
- Denyse Réal as Rachel
- Madeleine Suffel as Léontine

== Bibliography ==
- Thys, Marianne. Belgian Cinema. Royal Belgian Film Archive, 1999.
