= Camille Guérini =

French actor (1900–1963)

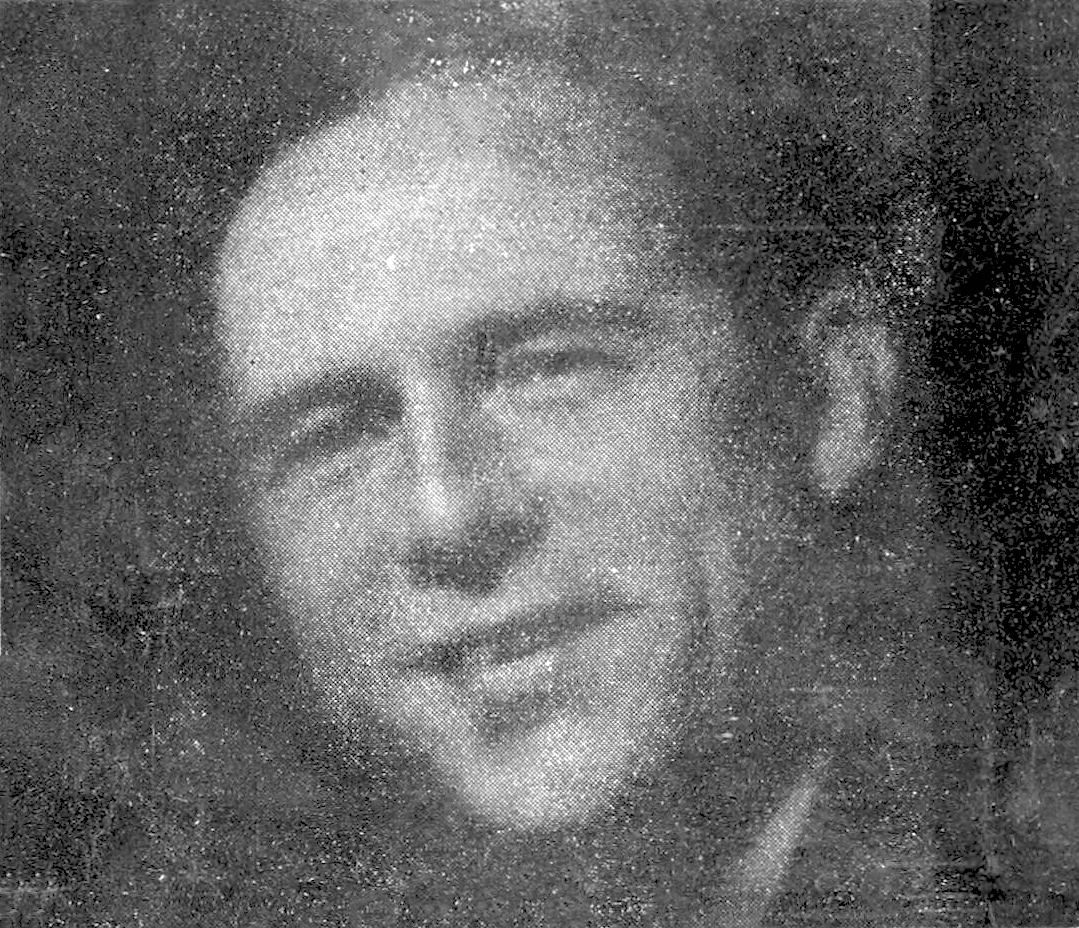
- Photo of Camille Guerini
- Born: 29 June 1900; Lorient, France
- Died: 15 April 1963 (aged 62); Clichy, Hauts-de-Seine, France
- Other name: Raymond Sébastien Girard
- Occupation: Actor
- Years active: 1937–1963 (film)

Camille Guérini (29 June 1900 – 15 April 1963) was a French film and television actor.

== Selected filmography ==
- La Chanson du souvenir (1937) - Veit, l'ordonnance
- The Blue Veil (1942) - d'Aubigny
- Les ailes blanches (1943) - (uncredited)
- Des jeunes filles dans la nuit (1943)
- Madame et le mort (1943) - L'organisateur
- Vingt-cinq ans de bonheur (1943)
- Monsieur des Lourdines (1943) - Nestor
- The Island of Love (1944)
- The Great Pack (1945) - La Ramée
- Song of the Clouds (1946)
- Impasse (1946)
- The Room Upstairs (1946) - Gardin - le facteur
- The Lovers of Pont Saint Jean (1947) - Le brigadier de gendarmerie
- Two Loves (1949) - Le régisseur
- Jean de la Lune (1949) - L'avoué
- La Marie du port (1950) - Le vendeur (uncredited)
- Lady Paname (1950) - Auguste Bosset
- Justice Is Done (1950) - Le représentant en meubles (uncredited)
- Paris Vice Squad (1951) - Le commissaire Husson, de la Mondaine
- Victor (1951) - Gratien
- Alone in Paris (1951) - Ernest Milliard
- Matrimonial Agency (1952) - Le commandant
- Imperial Violets (1952) - Le docteur (uncredited)
- It Happened in Paris (1952) - Le père de la petite fille
- Their Last Night (1953) - Monsieur Malafosse
- Stain in the Snow (1954) - Le commissaire
- Leguignon guérisseur (1954) - Un malade
- Les Diaboliques (1955) - Le photographe
- Gas-Oil (1955) - Lucien Ragondin
- Marguerite de la nuit (1955)
- Deadlier Than the Male (1956) - Gégène, le clochard
- Marie Antoinette Queen of France (1956) - Necker
- Le pays d'où je viens (1956)
- The Hunchback of Notre Dame (1956) - The President
- Sénéchal the Magnificent (1957) - Le restaurateur (uncredited)
- Mademoiselle et son gang (1957) - Un habitué de l'hôtel (uncredited)
- Les Espions (1957) - M. Bargeot, le bistrot (uncredited)
- L'amour est en jeu (1957)
- Le septième ciel (1958) - (uncredited)
- Sins of Youth (1958) - Le curé
- Maigret and the Saint-Fiacre Case (1959) - Gaultier - le régisseur
- Dialogue of the Carmelites (1960) - Docteur Javeline, le médecin du Carmel
- The Seventh Juror (1962) - Judge
- Gigot (1962) - Priest
- Le masque de fer (1962)
- Tartarin of Tarascon (1962) - Victor Bombonnel
- Two Are Guilty (1963) - Le juge Noblet (final film role)

== Bibliography ==
- Melissa E. Biggs. French films, 1945-1993: a critical filmography of the 400 most important releases. McFarland & Company, 1996.
