= The Keynote =

1911 novel by Alphonse de Châteaubriant

- Author: Alphonse de Châteaubriant
- Original title: Monsieur des Lourdines
- Translator: Theodora Davidson
- Language: French
- Publisher: éditions Grasset
- Publication date: 1911
- Publication place: France
- English publication date: 1912
- Pages: 285

The Keynote (French: Monsieur des Lourdines. Histoire d'un gentilhomme campagnard) is a 1911 novel by the French writer Alphonse de Châteaubriant. It received the Prix Goncourt.

== Plot ==
In 1840, the country gentleman Timothée des Lourdines has his secluded life interrupted when his irresponsible son becomes indebted in Paris.

== Reception ==
The novel received positive reviews in France and was awarded the Prix Goncourt. When Theodora Davidson's English translation was published in 1912, The New York Times called the reading "a constant pleasure", and wrote that the novel "ought to find favor among American readers, aside from its beauty and value as a work of literary art, because its matter, as a picture of life, its style, its method, its solution of the problem offered to father and son, are all diametrically opposed to anything in our own life and in the attitude of our fiction toward life".

== Adaptation ==
The Keynote was the basis for the 1943 French film Monsieur des Lourdines directed by Pierre de Hérain.
