= Hôtel du Parc =

Building in France

Coordinates: 46°07′31″N 3°25′09″E

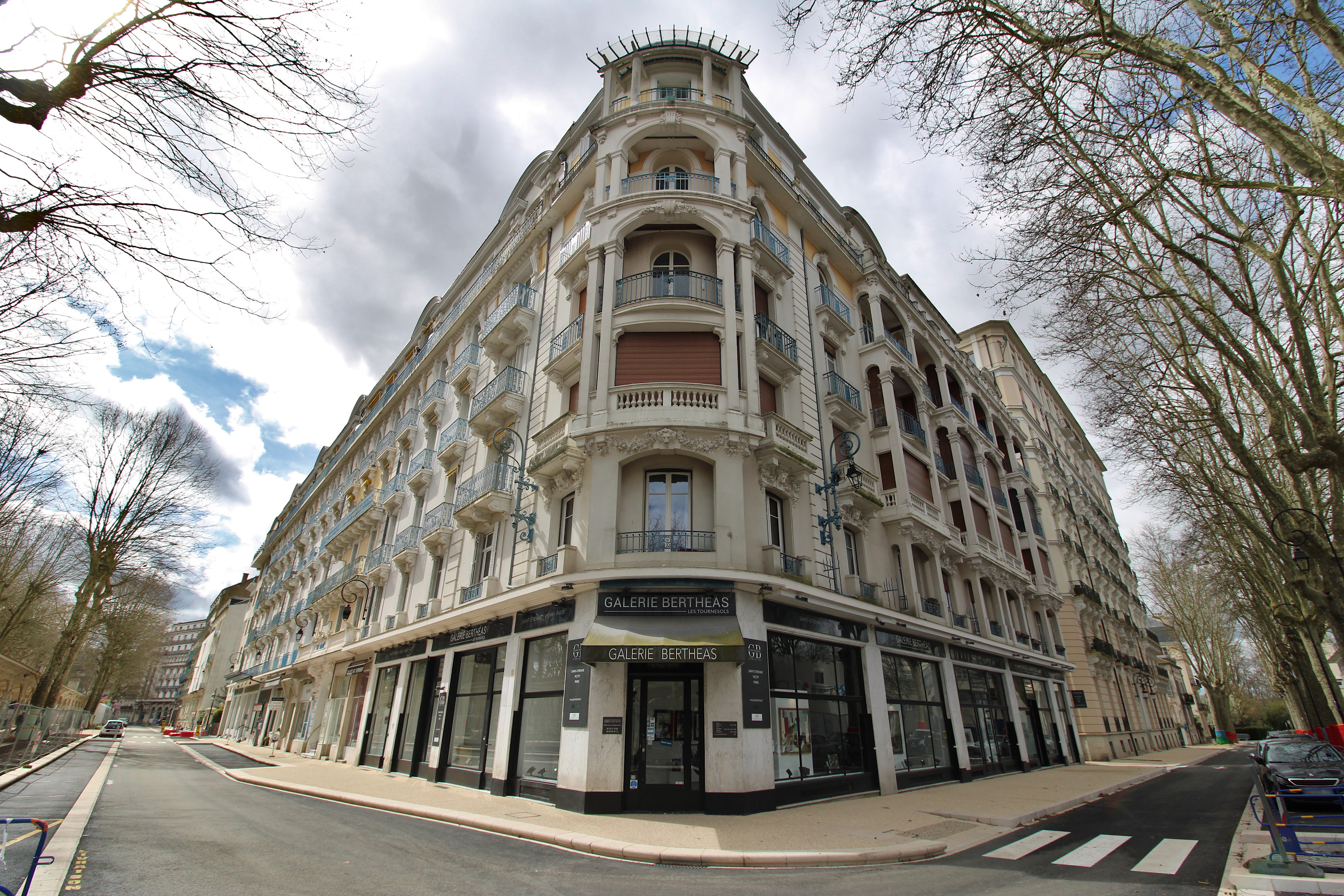
The Hôtel du Parc with, on the third floor, on the angle, the flat used by Maréchal Pétain

The Hôtel du Parc (Park Hotel) is a former hotel in the center of Vichy, a spa town in the center of France which hosted during the Second World War the government of the French state (État français), commonly known as Vichy France. The hotel hosted a part of the government offices and the private apartment and offices of the Maréchal Pétain, during the Vichy regime and after 1942 also the offices of Pierre Laval. The building is now a private real estate.

The bedroom and the private cabinet of Petain are still owned by the Association pour défendre la mémoire du maréchal Pétain (Association for the Defence of the Memory of Marshal Pétain).
