= Eugénie Pétain =

Philippe Pétain's wife (1877–1962)

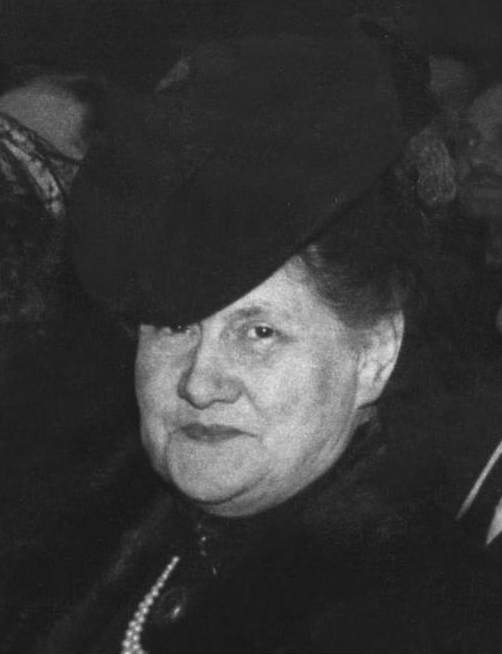
- Pétain in c. 1941–1944
- Born: Alphonsine Berthe Eugénie Hardon; 5 October 1877; Courquetaine, Seine-et-Marne, France
- Died: 30 January 1962 (aged 84); Paris, France
- Spouses: François de Hérain (m. 1903; div. 1914) Philippe Pétain (m. 1920; died 1951)
- Children: Pierre de Hérain

Alphonsine Berthe Eugénie Pétain (née Hardon; 5 October 1877 – 30 January 1962) was the wife of Marshal Philippe Pétain, the French military commander and political leader who ruled Vichy France between 1940 and 1944.

Marshal Pétain was her second husband. She had previously been married to François de Hérain, a doctor who later became an artist. Initially, under family pressure, she rejected Pétain's marriage proposal and instead married de Hérain. However, the marriage ended in divorce in March 1914. Her son from her first marriage, Pierre de Hérain, became a film director.

She married Pétain on 14 September 1920. He was reported to have been at a hotel with her the night he was appointed to take command at the Battle of Verdun in 1916.

On 30 January 1962, Eugénie Pétain died in the 7th arrondissement of Paris, aged 84. She was buried at the Montparnasse Cemetery, after a funeral at the church of Saint-Pierre-du-Gros-Caillou attended by notable Vichy survivors Alphonse Juin, Maxime Weygand, Jean Decoux, Gabriel Auphan, and Pierre Héring..

== Bibliography ==
- Atkin, Nicolas. Petain. Routledge, 2014; ISBN 978-0582070370
- Buckingham, William F. Verdun 1916: The Deadliest Battle of the First World War. Amberley 2016.
