= Alphonse de Châteaubriant =

French writer (1877–1951)

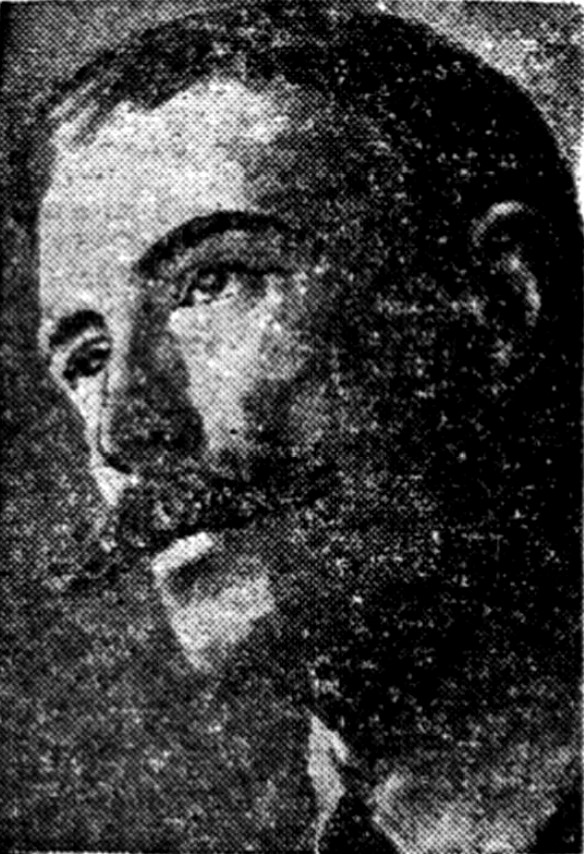
- de Châteaubriant in 1933
- Born: March 25, 1877; Rennes, France
- Died: 2 May 1951 (aged 74); Kitzbühel, Austria

Alphonse Van Bredenbeck de Châteaubriant (French pronunciation: [alfɔ̃s də ʃɑtobʁijɑ̃]; 25 March 1877 – 2 May 1951) was a French writer who received the Prix Goncourt in 1911 for his novel The Keynote and Grand prix du roman de l'Académie française for La Brière in 1923.

After a visit to Germany in 1935 he became an enthusiastic advocate for Nazism.

Along with other Breton nationalists he supported fascist and antisemitic ideas in opposition to the French state. In 1940 he founded the pro-Nazi weekly newspaper La Gerbe and served as President of the Groupe Collaboration. During World War II, he was a member of the central committee of the Légion des Volontaires Français contre le Bolchévisme, an organisation founded in 1941 by Fernand de Brinon and Jacques Doriot to recruit volunteers to fight alongside the Germans in the USSR. In 1945 he fled to Austria, where he lived under the alias Dr. Alfred Wolf until his death at a monastery in Kitzbühel.

== Works ==
- 1908: Le Baron de Puydreau (novella)
- 1909: Monsieur de Buysse (novella)
- 1911: The Keynote (Monsieur des Lourdines) (novel - Prix Goncourt)
- 1923: La Brière (novel - Grand prix du roman de l'Académie française)
- 1927: La Meute
- 1928: Locronan
- 1933: La Réponse du Seigneur
- 1937: La Gerbe des forces
- 1937: Le bouquet fané
- 1938: Les pas ont chanté
- 1953: ...Des saisons et des jours... Journal de l'auteur, 1911-1924
- 2004: Fragments d'une confession – La sainteté
