= List of ambassadors to Monaco =

This is a list of ambassadors to Monaco.

== Ambassadors to Monaco ==
List of ambassadors to Monaco by country and date of presentation of credentials:

First ambassador accredited from each country

Country	Ambassador	Presentation of credentials	Ref
Italy	Mario Polverini	2 January 2006	
France	Serge Telle	15 February 2006	
Holy See	André Dupuy	26 September 2006	
China	Jinjun Zhao	29 September 2006	
Switzerland	François Nordmann	10 October 2006	
Bosnia and Herzegovina	Željana Zovko	12 December 2006	
United States	Craig Roberts Stapleton	13 December 2006	
Ireland	Anne Anderson	9 January 2007	
Thailand	Thana Duangratana	9 January 2007	
Belgium	Pierre-Dominique Schmidt	16 January 2007	
Philippines	Jose Abeto Zaide	16 January 2007	
Dominican Republic	Guillermo Pina-Contreras	12 February 2007	
Morocco	Fathallah Sijilmassi	12 February 2007	
Argentina	Eric Calcagno	13 February 2007	
Qatar	Mohammed Jaham Al Kuwari	13 February 2007	
Israel	Daniel Shek	20 February 2007	
Russia	Aleksandr Avdeyev	16 April 2007	
Australia	Penelope Wensley	3 May 2007	
Netherlands	Hugo Hans Siblesz	3 May 2007	
Egypt	Nasser Kamel	31 May 2007	
Algeria	Missoum Sbih	14 June 2007	
South Korea	Il-hwan Cho	14 June 2007	
El Salvador	Joaquim Rodezno Munguia	11 July 2007	
Malta	Victoria Ann Cremona	11 July 2007	
Austria	Hubert Heiss	17 July 2007	
Japan	Yutaka Ilmura	17 July 2007	
France	Éric Danon	11 September 2007	
United Kingdom	Peter Westmacott	21 September 2007	
Montenegro	Milica Pejanović-Đurišić	17 October 2007	
Switzerland	Ulrich Lehner	17 October 2007	
Andorra	Xavier Espot Miro	7 November 2007	
Serbia	Predrag Šimić	7 November 2007	
Germany	Peter Ammon	13 December 2007	
Slovakia	Jàn Kuderjavy	13 December 2007	
Finland	Kaarlo Murto	21 March 2008	
Mexico	Carlos Alberto de Icaza Gonzalez	21 March 2008	
Jamaica	Marcia Gilbert-Roberts	4 April 2008	
Ukraine	Kostiantyn Tymoshenko	4 April 2008	
Canada	Marc Lortie	10 April 2008	
Poland	Tomasz Orłowski	10 April 2008	
Chile	Pilar Armanet	15 April 2008	
France	Odile Remik-Adim	15 April 2008	
Seychelles	Claude Morel	15 April 2008	
Belgium	Baudouin de la Kethulle de Ryhove	15 May 2008	
Romania	Teodor Baconschi	15 May 2008	
China	Kong Quan	5 June 2008	
Azerbaijan	Tarik Aliev	15 July 2008	
Lesotho	Makase Nyaphisi	15 July 2008	
Czech Republic	Pavel Fischer	16 September 2008	
Turkey	Osman T. Korutürk	16 September 2008	
Italy	Franco Mistretta	9 October 2008	
Bosnia and Herzegovina	Almir Sahovic	28 October 2008	
Bulgaria	Irina Georgieva Bokova	28 October 2008	
Australia	David Alexander Ritchie	25 November 2008	
Luxembourg	Georges Santer	25 November 2008	
Cuba	Rogelio Sánchez Levis	10 February 2009	
Germany	Reinhard Schäfers	10 February 2009	
India	Ranjan Mathai	5 March 2009	
Vietnam	Kinh Tai Le	5 March 2009	
Latvia	Jānis Kārkliņš	12 March 2009	
San Marino	Luciano Cardelli	12 March 2009	
Argentina	Luis Ureta Sáenz Peña	24 March 2009	
Russia	Alexander Orlov	24 March 2009	
Philippines	Rora Navarro-Tolentino	27 May 2009	
Venezuela	Jesus Arnaldo Perez	27 May 2009	
Equatorial Guinea	Federico Edjo Ovono	16 June 2009	
Uruguay	Alberto Lepra Loiodice	16 June 2009	
Senegal	Maïmouna Sourang	23 June 2009	
Dominica	Eric Torner	13 July 2009	
Georgia	Mamuka Kudava	13 July 2009	
Japan	Yasuo Saitō	17 July 2009	
Ireland	Paul Kavanagh	15 September 2009	
Sweden	Gunnar Lund	15 September 2009	
United States	Charles Rivkin	29 October 2009	
Finland	Pilvi-Sisko Vierros-Villeneuve	5 February 2010	
Portugal	Francisco Seixas da Costa	5 February 2010	
Greece	Constantin Chalastanis	16 March 2010	
Pakistan	Shafkat Saeed	16 March 2010	
Cuba	Orlando Requeijo Gual	8 April 2010	
Malta	Mark A. Miggiani	8 April 2010	
Estonia	Margus Rava	20 May 2010	
South Korea	Heung-shin Park	20 May 2010	
Kazakhstan	Nurlan Danenov	28 May 2010	
Timor-Leste	Joaquim Antonio Maria Lopes da Fonseca	28 May 2010	
Morocco	Mostapha Sahel	10 June 2010	
Thailand	Viraphand Vacharathit	10 June 2010	
Andorra	Liuis Viu Torres	29 June 2010	
Azerbaijan	Elchin Oktyabr oglu Amirbayov	29 June 2010	
Serbia	Dušan T. Bataković	6 July 2010	
Turkey	Tahsin Burcuoglu	6 July 2010	
Afghanistan	Omar Samad	13 October 2010	
Peru	Harry Belevan-McBride	13 October 2010	
Italy	Antonio Morabito	14 October 2010	
Mongolia	Altangerel Shukher	21 October 2010	
Slovakia	Marek Estok	21 October 2010	
Sovereign Military Order of Malta	Peter K. Murphy	29 October 2010	
Norway	Tarald Brautaset	8 February 2011	
Slovenia	Veronika Stabej	8 February 2011	
South Africa	Dolana Msimang	23 February 2011	
Gabon	Félicité Ongouori Ngoubili	18 April 2011	
Montenegro	Irena Radović	18 April 2011	
Cyprus	Kornelios Korneliou	10 May 2011	
El Salvador	Galindo Velez	10 May 2011	
Belgium	Vercauteren Drubbel	16 May 2011	
Chile	Jorge Edwards	16 May 2011	
Panama	Henry J. Faarup	16 May 2011	
Brazil	José Maurício de Figueiredo Bustani	13 September 2011	
Dominican Republic	Laura Faxas	13 September 2011	
Latvia	Sanita Pavļuta-Deslandes	13 September 2011	
Lithuania	Jolanta Balčiūnienė	8 November 2011	
Switzerland	Jean-Jacques de Dardel	8 November 2011	
Ukraine	Oleksandr Kupchyshyn	8 November 2011	
France	Hugues Moret	9 November 2011	
Philippines	Cristina G. Ortega	31 January 2012	
Austria	Ursula Plassnik	9 February 2012	
Denmark	Anne Dorte Riggelsen	9 February 2012	
Bosnia and Herzegovina	Nina Sajic	21 February 2012	
Djibouti	Rachad Farah	21 February 2012	
Japan	Ichirō Komatsu	21 February 2012	
Gabon	Boubacar Sidiki Touré	15 May 2012	
Mali	Germain Ngoyo Moussavou	15 May 2012	
Nepal	Mohan Krishna Shrestha	15 May 2012	
Albania	Ylljet Alicka	10 September 2012	
Malta	Pierre Clive Agius	10 September 2012	
Cyprus	Marios Lyssiotis	18 September 2012	
Malawi	Brave Rona Ndisale	18 September 2012	
Peru	Cristina Velita de Laboureix	18 September 2012	
Canada	Lawrence Cannon	30 October 2012	
Germany	Susanne Wasum-Rainer	30 October 2012	
Australia	Ric Wells	15 January 2013	
Iran	Ali Ahani	15 January 2013	
Kosovo	Muhamedin Kullashi	22 January 2013	
Netherlands	Everardus Kronenburg	22 January 2013	
Nigeria	Akin Fayomi	22 January 2013	
Egypt	Mohamed Moustafa Kamal	19 February 2013	
Jamaica	Vilma Kathleen McNish	19 February 2013	
Luxembourg	Paul Dühr	6 June 2013	
Thailand	Somsakdi Suriyawongse	6 June 2013	
Croatia	Ivo Goldstein	13 June 2013	
Albania	Dritan Tola	2 October 2013	
Morocco	Chakib Benmoussa	2 October 2013	
Seychelles	Bernard Shamlaye	2 October 2013	
Dominican Republic	Carlos de Icaza González	4 December 2013	
India	Arun Kumar Singh	4 December 2013	
Mexico	Laura Faxas	4 December 2013	
Georgia	Ecaterine Siradze-Delaunay	13 January 2014	
Japan	Yoichi Suzuki	13 January 2014	
Spain	Carlos Bastarreche	13 January 2014	
Equatorial Guinea	Mariola Bindang Obiang	30 January 2014	
Ireland	Rory Montgomery	30 January 2014	
Serbia	Rajko Ristic	30 January 2014	
Nigeria	Hakeem Olawale Sulaiman	27 March 2014	
Portugal	José Filipe Moraes Cabral	27 March 2014	
Senegal	Paul Badji	27 March 2014	
China	Jun Zhai	10 April 2014	
Rwanda	Jacques Kabale Nyangezi	10 April 2014	
Sudan	Nasreldin Ahmed Wali Abdeltif	10 April 2014	
Greece	Théodore M. Passas	24 June 2014	
Malaysia	Tan Sri Ismail Omar	24 June 2014	
Philippines	Domingo D. Lee	17 July 2014	
Burkina Faso	Eric Yemdaogo Tiare	19 September 2014	
Finland	Risto Piipponen	19 September 2014	
Turkey	Hakki Akil	19 September 2014	
France	Hadelin de La Tour du Pin	15 October 2014	
Malta	Anthony Miceli Demajo	22 October 2014	
Australia	Stephen Brady	3 February 2015	
Brunei	Dato Paduka Zainidi Sidup	3 February 2015	
Colombia	Federico Alonso Renjifo Velez	3 February 2015	
Bulgaria	Anguel Hristov Tcholakov	5 February 2015	
Guatemala	Marco Tulio Chicas Sosa	5 February 2015	
Spain	Ramon de Miguel y Egea	5 February 2015	
Mali	Cheick Mouctary Diarra	19 February 2015	
Mongolia	Mundagbaatar Batsaikhan	19 February 2015	
Timor-Leste	Marciano Octavio Garcia Da Silva	19 February 2015	
Ireland	Geraldine Byrne-Nason	24 February 2015	
Qatar	Meshal bin Hamad Al Thani	24 February 2015	
Sweden	Veronika Wand-Danielsson	24 February 2015	
Norway	Rolf Einar Fife	30 March 2015	
Paraguay	Emilio Gimenez Franco	30 March 2015	
Vietnam	Ngoc Son Nguyen	30 March 2015	
Chile	Patricio Hales Dib	24 April 2015	
Lesotho	Lineo Khechane-Ntoane	24 April 2015	
Poland	Andrzej Byrt	24 April 2015	
Bosnia and Herzegovina	Ivan Orlic	18 June 2015	
Italy	Massimo Lavezzo Cassinelli	22 June 2015	
San Marino	Sylvie Bollini	7 September 2015	
Costa Rica	Marco Vinicio Vargas Pereira	22 October 2015	
New Zealand	James Loudon Kember	22 October 2015	
South Africa	Rapu Molekane	22 October 2015	
Belgium	Patrick Renault	27 October 2015	
Brazil	Eduardo dos Santos	27 October 2015	
Mauritania	Abdoulaye Idrissa Wagne	27 October 2015	
South Korea	Chul-min Mo	27 October 2015	
Denmark	Kirsten Malling Biering	5 November 2015	
Malawi	Tedson Aubrey Kalebe	5 November 2015	
Slovenia	Andrej Slapničar	5 November 2015	
Greece	Dimitrios Paraskevopoulos	24 November 2015	
Lithuania	Gediminas Varvuolis	24 November 2015	
Germany	Nikolaus Meyer-Landrut	1 December 2015	
Israel	Aliza Bin-Noun	1 December 2015	
Estonia	Alar Streimann	11 February 2016	
Ivory Coast	Léon Kacou Adom	11 February 2016	
Montenegro	Zoran Janković	11 February 2016	
Togo	Calixte Batossie Madjoula	22 March 2016	
Djibouti	Ayeid Mousseid Yahya	21 April 2016	
Holy See	Luigi Pezzuto	25 May 2016	
France	Marine de Carné	19 September 2016	
Italy	Cristiano Gallo	19 September 2016	
Nepal	Ambika Devi Luintel	10 October 2016	
Mexico	Juan Manuel Gómez-Robledo Verduzco	10 October 2016	
Romania	Luca Niculescu	10 October 2016	
Japan	Masato Kitera	12 October 2016	
Moldova	Lilian Moraru	12 October 2016	
Sovereign Military Order of Malta	Umberto di Capua	12 October 2016	
United Arab Emirates	Maadhad Hareb Meghair Jaber Alkhyeli	12 October 2016	
Hungary	György Károlyi	16 October 2016	
Mauritania	Aichetou M’Haïham	16 October 2016	
Thailand	Sihasak Phuangketkeow	16 October 2016	
Argentina	Jorge Marcelo Faurie	15 December 2016	
Senegal	Bassirou Sene	15 December 2016	
Belarus	Pavel Latushka	25 April 2017	
Sri Lanka	Tilak Ranaviraja	25 April 2017	
Sudan	Daffa-Alla Elhag Ali Osman	25 April 2017	
United Kingdom	Edward Llewellyn	25 April 2017	
El Salvador	Marlon T. Tabora Muñoz	16 June 2017	
Latvia	Imants Viesturs Lieģis	16 June 2017	
Pakistan	Moin ul Haque	16 June 2017	
Czech Republic	Petr Drulák	22 June 2017	
Kosovo	Qëndrim Gashi	22 June 2017	
Qatar	Khalid Bin Rashid Salem Al-Mansouri	22 June 2017	
Uruguay	Guillaume Dighiero Arrarte	22 June 2017	
Iceland	Kristjan Andri Stefansson	13 July 2017	
Malaysia	Datuk Ibrahim Abdullah	13 July 2017	
Peru	Alvaro De Soto	13 July 2017	
Turkey	Ismail Hakki Musa	13 July 2017	
Chile	Marcia Covarrubias	12 October 2017	
Fiji	Deo Saran	12 October 2017	
Cyprus	Pantelakis D. Eliakes	19 October 2017	
New Zealand	Jane Coombs	19 October 2017	
Poland	Tomasz Mlynarski	19 October 2017	
Slovakia	Igor Slobodnik	19 October 2017	
Ireland	Patricia O'Brien	30 October 2017	
Netherlands	Pieter de Gooijer	30 October 2017	
Spain	Fernando Carderera Soler	30 October 2017	
Austria	Walter Grahammer	29 January 2018	
Australia	Brendan Berne	29 January 2018	
India	Vinay Mohan Kwatra	29 January 2018	
Luxembourg	Martine Schommer	29 January 2018	
Azerbaijan	Rahman Sahib oglu Mustafayev	13 March 2018	
Brunei	Datin Paduka Malai Hajah Halimah Yussof	13 March 2018	
Republic of the Congo	Rodolphe Adada	13 March 2018	
Russia	Alexey Meshkov	13 March 2018	
United States	Jamie McCourt	16 March 2018	
Burkina Faso	Alain Francis Gustave Ilboudo	24 April 2018	
Canada	Isabelle Hudon	24 April 2018	
Cuba	Elio Eduardo Rodriguez Perdomo	24 April 2018	
Moldova	Emil Druc	24 April 2018	
Croatia	Filip Vucak	29 May 2018	
Nigeria	Modupe E. Irele	29 May 2018	
Sri Lanka	Buddhi K. Athauda	29 May 2018	
Vietnam	Thiep Nguyen	29 May 2018	
Gabon	Favien Enongoue	27 June 2018	
Kazakhstan	Jean Galiev	27 June 2018	
Portugal	Jorge Ryder Torres-Pereira	27 June 2018	
Seychelles	Louis Sylvestre Radegonde	27 June 2018	
Algeria	Abdelkader Mesdoua	19 September 2018	
Finland	Teemu Tanner	19 September 2018	
Lesotho	Calvin Retselisitsoe Masenyetse	19 September 2018	
Tunisia	Abdelaziz Rassaa	19 September 2018	
Greece	Aglaia Balta	2 October 2018	
Jamaica	Sheila Sealy Monteith	2 October 2018	
Kuwait	Sami Mohammad Al-Sulaiman	2 October 2018	
South Korea	Jong-moon Choi	2 October 2018	
Antigua and Barbuda	Dario Item	28 February 2019	
Bahrain	Muhammad Abdul Ghaffar	28 February 2019	
Bosnia and Herzegovina	Kemal Muftic	28 February 2019	
Panama	José Alberto Fabrega Roux	28 February 2019	
Belgium	François de Kerchove d'Exaerde	14 May 2019	
Benin	Auguste C. Alavo	14 May 2019	
Lebanon	Rami Adwan	14 May 2019	
Switzerland	Livia Leu Agosti	14 May 2019	
Austria	Michael Linhart	10 September 2019	
Denmark	Michael Starbaek Christensen	10 September 2019	
Holy See	Antonio Arcari	10 September 2019	
France	Laurent Stefanini	19 September 2019	
Chile	Juan Salazar Sparks	5 November 2019	
Indonesia	Arrmanatha Christiawan Nasir	5 November 2019	
Norway	Oda Helen Sletnes	5 November 2019	
Qatar	Sheikh Ali Bin Jassim Al-Thani	5 November 2019	
Belarus	Igor Fissenko	6 December 2019	
Malaysia	Dato' Dr Azfar Mohamad Mustafar	6 December 2019	
Mali	Toumani Djimé Diallo	6 December 2019	
Brazil	Luis Fernando de Andrade Serra	21 January 2020	
China	Lu Shaye	21 January 2020	
Montenegro	Ivan Ivanisevic	21 January 2020	
Serbia	Natasa Maric	21 January 2020	
Niger	Ado Elhadji Abou	2 March 2020	
Slovenia	Metka Ipavic	2 March 2020	
Peru	Cristina Ronquillo De Blodorn	2 March 2020	
Angola	João Bernardo de Miranda	9 March 2020	
Andorra	Eva Descarrega Garcia	9 March 2020	
Cape Verde	Hércules do Nascimento Cruz	9 March 2020	
Estonia	Clyde Kull	9 March 2020	
Italy	Giulio Alaimo	16 September 2020	
Georgia	Tea Katukia	22 September 2020	
South Africa	Tebogo Seokolo	22 September 2020	
Thailand	Sarun Charoensuwan	22 September 2020	
Armenia	Hasmik Tolmajyan	20 October 2020	
Colombia	Viviane Aleyda Morales Hoyos	20 October 2020	
Ethiopia	Henok Teferra Shawl	20 October 2020	
Lithuania	Nerijus Aleksiejunas	20 October 2020	
Czech Republic	Michal Fleischmann	26 November 2020	
India	Jawed Ashraf	26 November 2020	
Japan	Junichi Ihara	26 November 2020	
Spain	José Manuel Albares	26 November 2020	
Cambodia	Sophann Ket	11 February 2021	
Germany	Hans-Dieter Lucas	11 February 2021	
Sweden	Hakan Akesson	11 February 2021	
Honduras	Ivonne Bonilla Medina	6 April 2021	
Iran	Bahram Ghasemi	6 April 2021	
Latvia	Eduards Stiprais	6 April 2021	
Argentina	Leonardo Daniel Costantino	29 April 2021	
Benin	Eusèbe Agbangla	29 April 2021	
Jordan	Makram Mustafa A. Queisi	29 April 2021	
Nepal	Dipak Adhikari	29 April 2021	
Gabon	Liliane Massala	14 October 2021	
Madagascar	Olivier Rija Rajohnson	14 October 2021	
Switzerland	Roberto Balzaretti	14 October 2021	
Turkey	Refik Ali Onaner	14 October 2021	
Algeria	Mohamed Antar Daoud	21 October 2021	
Burundi	Ernest Niyokindi	21 October 2021	
Namibia	Albertus Aochamub	21 October 2021	
South Korea	Dae-jong Yoo	21 October 2021	
Australia	Gillian Bird	8 March 2022	
Egypt	Alaaeldin Zakaria Youssef	8 March 2022	
Hungary	Georg von Habsburg	8 March 2022	
Ukraine	Vadym Omelchenko	8 March 2022	
Lesotho	Senate Barbara Masupha	15 March 2022	
Mauritania	Ahmed Bahiya	15 March 2022	
Bulgaria	Nikolay Milkov	26 April 2022	
Norway	Niels Engelschion	26 April 2022	
Philippines	Junever Mahilum-West	26 April 2022	
Timor-Leste	Maria de Lurdes Bessa	26 April 2022	
Cyprus	Georgios Chacalli	3 May 2022	
El Salvador	Lorena Sol de Pool	3 May 2022	
Mexico	Blanca Elena Jimenez Cisneros	3 May 2022	
Vietnam	Toan Thang Dinh	3 May 2022	
Ghana	Anna Bossman	10 May 2022	
Ivory Coast	Maurice Kouakou Bandaman	10 May 2022	
Malaysia	Dato' Mohd Zamruni Bin Khalid	10 May 2022	
United Kingdom	Menna Rawlings	10 May 2022	
Ecuador	Oscar José Orrantia Vernaza	17 May 2022	
Guinea-Bissau	Carlos-Edmilson Marques-Vieira	17 May 2022	
Indonesia	Mohamad Oemar	17 May 2022	
Spain	Victorio Redondo Baldrich	17 May 2022	
United States	Denise Bauer	29 September 2022	
Nigeria	Kayode Ibrahim Laro	18 October 2022	
Panama	Issamary Sanchez Ortega	18 October 2022	
San Marino	Giovanni Luca Ghiotti	18 October 2022	
United Arab Emirates	Hend Manea Saeed Al Otaiba	18 October 2022	
Malawi	Naomi Aretha Ngwira	20 October 2022	
Ireland	Niall Burgess	20 October 2022	
Mozambique	Alberto Maverengue Augusto	20 October 2022	
New Zealand	Caroline Bilkey	20 October 2022	
Greece	Dimitrios Zevelakis	5 May 2023	
Kosovo	Mehdi Halimi	5 May 2023	
Poland	Jan Emeryk Rosciszewski	5 May 2023	
Thailand	Tana Weskosith	5 May 2023	
Cuba	Otto Vaillant Frias	9 May 2023	
Estonia	Lembit Uibo	9 May 2023	
Jamaica	Symone Marie Betton-Nayo	9 May 2023	
Peru	Rolando Javier Ruiz-Rosas Cateriano	9 May 2023	
Bosnia and Herzegovina	Bojana Kondić-Panić	17 May 2023	
Iceland	Unnur Orradóttir Ramette	17 May 2023	
Netherlands	Jan Théophile Versteeg	17 May 2023	
Pakistan	Asim Iftikhar Ahmad	17 May 2023	
Bangladesh	Khondker M. Talha	13 June 2023	
Canada	Stéphane Dion	13 June 2023	
Kazakhstan	Gulsara Arystankulova	13 June 2023	
Mongolia	Ulambayar Nyamkhuu	13 June 2023	
France	Jean d'Haussonville	5 September 2023	
Algeria	Saïd Moussi	6 October 2023	
Georgia	Gocha Javakhishvili	6 October 2023	
Luxembourg	Marc Ungeheuer	6 October 2023	
Saudi Arabia	Fahad M. Al Ruwaily	6 October 2023	
Brunei	Abdul Ghani Maulana	6 November 2023	
Finland	Nina Vaskunlahti	6 November 2023	
Japan	Okada Kenichi	6 November 2023	
Sudan	Mohamed Abdalla Idris	6 November 2023	
Moldova	Corina Calugaru	7 November 2023	
Portugal	José Augusto de Jesus Duarte	7 November 2023	
Rwanda	François Nkulikiyimfura	7 November 2023	
South Korea	Jai Chul Choi	7 November 2023	
Azerbaijan	Leyla Abdullayeva	12 February 2024	
Brazil	Ricardo Neiva Tavares	12 February 2024	
Chile	Raúl Eduardo Fernández-Daza	12 February 2024	
Seychelles	Kenneth Jacques Gervais Racombo	12 February 2024	
Belgium	Jo Indekeu	12 March 2024	
Romania	Ioana Bivolaru	12 March 2024	
Slovakia	Jan Soth	12 March 2024	
Venezuela	Arturo Enrique Gil Pinto	12 March 2024	
Germany	Stephan Steinlein	11 April 2024	
Sovereign Military Order of Malta	Alberto di Luca	11 April 2024	
Turkey	Yunus Demirer	11 April 2024	
Italy	Manuela Ruosi	16 September 2024	
Angola	Guilhermina Prata	18 September 2024	
Colombia	Hernando Alfonso Prada Gil	18 September 2024	
Holy See	Martin Krebs	18 September 2024	
Uruguay	Jorge Luis Jure Arnoletti	18 September 2024	
Cambodia	David Luy	17 October 2024	
Cyprus	Pavlos Kombos	17 October 2024	
Ethiopia	Mahlet Hailu Guadey	17 October 2024	
Sri Lanka	Manisha Gunasekera	17 October 2024	
Burundi	Isaïe Kubwayo	25 October 2024	
Nepal	Sudhir Bhattarai	25 October 2024	
Serbia	Ana Hrustanovic	25 October 2024	
Gabon	Marie-Edith Tassyla-Ye-Doumbeneny	1 April 2025	
Jordan	Leena Al-Hadid	1 April 2025	
Paraguay	Cynthia Filártiga-Lacroix	1 April 2025	
Tunisia	Dhia Khaled	1 April 2025	
Austria	Barbara Kaudel-Jensen	3 April 2025	
Guinea	Senkoun Sylla	3 April 2025	
Honduras	Luis Alberto Posadas Alfaro	3 April 2025	
Malaysia	Datuk Eldeen Husaini Bin Mohd Hashim	3 April 2025	
Czech Republic	Jaroslav Kurfürst	30 May 2025	
Iran	Mohammad Amin Nejad	30 May 2025	
Thailand	Sarun Charoensuwan	30 May 2025	
Turkmenistan	Maksat Chariev	30 May 2025	
Andorra	Esther Rabasa Grau	3 June 2025	
China	Li Deng	3 June 2025	
Lithuania	Arnoldas Pranckevičius	3 June 2025	
Oman	Ahmed Mohamed Nasser Al Araimi	3 June 2025	
Australia	Lynette Margaret Wood	17 September 2025	
Latvia	Alise Balode	17 September 2025	
Slovenia	Renata Cvelbar Bek	17 September 2025	
Switzerland	Tania Cavassini	17 September 2025	
Denmark	Hanne Fugl Eskjaer	7 October 2025	
Mauritania	Mohamed Yahya Teiss	7 October 2025	
Pakistan	Mumtaz Zahra Baloch	7 October 2025	
Uzbekistan	Nodir Ganiev	7 October 2025	
Bahrain	Essam Abdulaziz Aljassim	14 October 2025	
Kenya	Betty Chebet Cherwon	14 October 2025	
Argentina	Ian Sielecki	21 October 2025	
Armenia	Armen Khachatryan	21 October 2025	
Israel	Joshua Zarka	21 October 2025	
Portugal	Bernardo Futscher Pereira	21 October 2025	
Timor-Leste	António da Conceição	21 October 2025	
Guatemala	Ricardo Estrada Samayoa	10 March 2026	
India	Sanjeev Singla	10 March 2026	
Liberia	Teeko Tozay Yorlay	10 March 2026	
United Kingdom	Peter Wilson	10 March 2026	
Finland	Kirsikka Lehto-Asikainen	12 March 2026	
Iceland	María Mjöll Jónsdóttir	12 March 2026	
Philippines	Eduardo José Atienza de Vega	12 March 2026	
Sovereign Military Order of Malta	Daniela Memmo d’Amelio	12 March 2026	
Sweden	Carole Vicini	12 March 2026	
Benin	Corinne Brunet	2 April 2026	
Estonia	Viljar Lubi	2 April 2026	
Hungary	Miklós Erik Tromler	2 April 2026	
Kuwait	Abdullah Suleiman Alshaheen	2 April 2026	
Norway	Vegar Sundsbø Brynildsen	2 April 2026	
Georgia	Irakli Kurashvili	7 April 2026	
Japan	Hideo Suzuki	7 April 2026	
Lesotho	Mafelile Christina Molala	7 April 2026	
Montenegro	Dubravka Lalović	7 April 2026	
Panama	Joanna Villarreal Rodriguez	7 April 2026	
France	Christophe Lemoine	17 September 2026	
Dominican Republic	David Emmanuel Puig Buchel	15 October 2026	
Egypt	Tarek Dahroug	15 October 2026	
Ecuador	Ana Maria Pesantes Salazar	15 October 2026	
Guinea-Bissau	Henrique Adriano da Silva	15 October 2026	
San Marino	Marta Fabbri	15 October 2026	
Gabon	Alfred Nguia Banda	22 October 2026	
Greece	Ioannis-Miltiadis Nicolaidis	22 October 2026	
Jamaica	Diedre Mills	22 October 2026	
New Zealand	Joanna Kempkers	22 October 2026	
Burundi	Spès-Caritas Njebarikanuye	27 October 2026	
Canada	Nathalie Drouin	27 October 2026	
El Salvador	Tania Camila Rosa	27 October 2026	
Lebanon	Rabih Chaer	27 October 2026	
South Korea	Kwon Hyuk-woon	27 October 2026	
Thailand	Nikorndej Balankura	27 October 2026	

== See also ==
- Foreign relations of Monaco
- List of diplomatic missions of Monaco
- List of diplomatic missions in Monaco
