= Balčiūnas =

Balčiūnas is the masculine form of a Lithuanian family name. Its feminine forms are: Balčiūnienė (married woman or widow) and Balčiūnaitė (unmarried woman).

The surname may refer to:

- Egidijus Balčiūnas (b. 1975), Lithuanian sprint canoe racer
- Eglė Balčiūnaitė, Lithuanian track and field middle-distance runner
- Gintaras Balčiūnas (b. 1964), Lithuanian lawyer, Minister of Justice
- Jolanta Balčiūnienė, (b. 1962), Lithuanian diplomat
- Linas Balčiūnas (b. 1978), Lithuanian road and track cyclist
- Valerijonas Balčiūnas, (1904–1984), Lithuanian footballer
- Valdas Balčiūnas, Lithuanian sailor
- Živilė Balčiūnaitė, Lithuanian Marathon runner
