= List of diplomatic missions in Monaco =

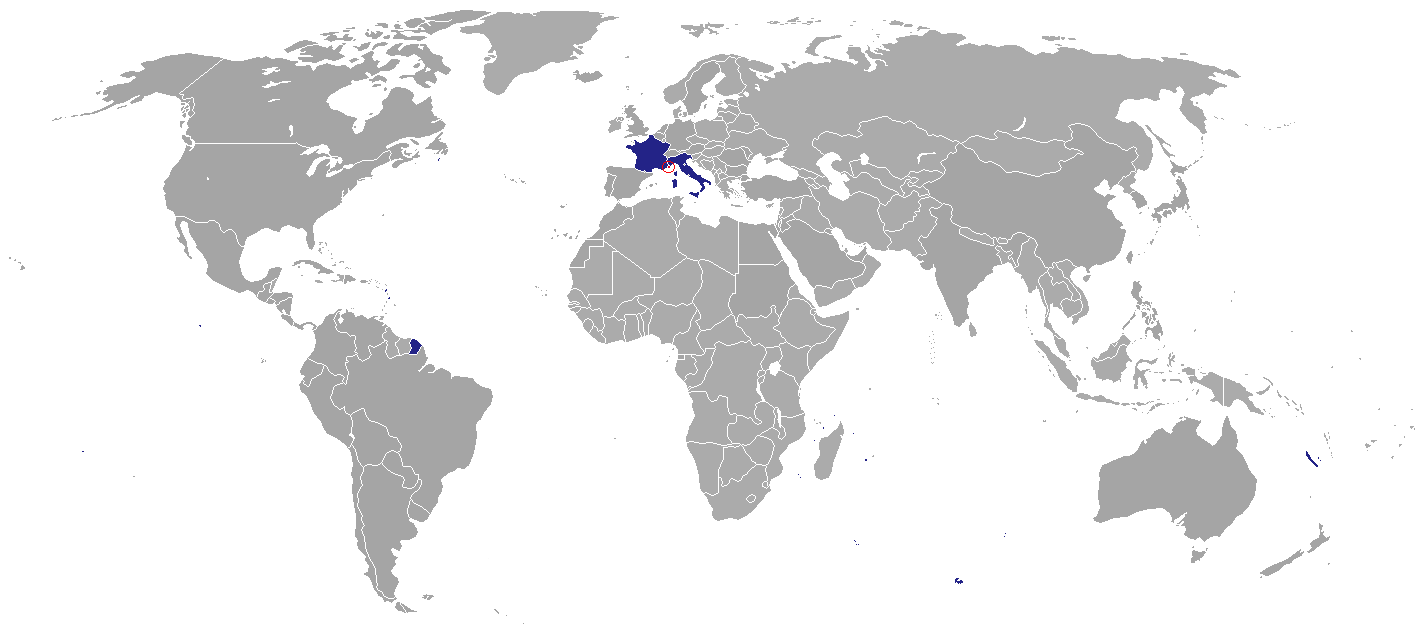
Diplomatic missions in Monaco

This article lists diplomatic missions resident in Monaco. At present, the Principality hosts three embassies. Some countries, while accrediting an ambassador from Paris, conduct day-to-day relations and provide consular services from consulates-general in nearby French cities, such as Marseille or Nice, or employ Honorary Consuls.

== Embassies ==
La Rousse

- France
- Italy

Monte Carlo

- Sovereign Military Order of Malta

== Non-resident embassies ==
Resident in Paris, France unless otherwise stated.

- Afghanistan
- Albania
- Algeria
- Andorra
- Angola
- Antigua and Barbuda (Madrid)
- Argentina
- Armenia
- Australia
- Austria
- Azerbaijan
- Bahrain
- Belarus
- Belgium
- Benin
- Bosnia and Herzegovina
- Brazil
- Brunei
- Bulgaria
- Burkina Faso
- Burundi
- Canada
- Central African Republic
- Chile
- China
- Colombia
- Republic of Congo
- Costa Rica
- Croatia
- Cuba
- Cyprus
- Czech Republic
- Denmark
- Djibouti
- Dominica (London)
- Dominican Republic
- East Timor (Geneva)
- Ecuador
- Egypt
- El Salvador
- Equatorial Guinea
- Estonia
- Fiji (Brussels)
- Finland
- Gabon
- Georgia
- Germany
- Greece
- Grenada (Brussels)
- Guatemala
- Guinea
- Haiti
- Holy See (Brussels)
- Honduras
- Hungary
- Iceland
- India
- Indonesia
- Iran
- Iraq
- Ireland
- Israel
- Japan
- Jamaica (Brussels)
- Kazakhstan
- Kenya
- Kosovo
- Kuwait
- Laos
- Latvia
- Lebanon
- Lesotho (Berlin)
- Liberia
- Libya
- Liechtenstein (Brussels)
- Lithuania
- Luxembourg
- Madagascar
- Malawi (Brussels)
- Malaysia
- Mali
- Malta (Valletta)
- Mauritius
- Mauritania
- Mexico
- Moldova
- Mongolia
- Montenegro
- Morocco
- Mozambique
- Nepal
- Netherlands
- New Zealand
- Nicaragua
- Niger
- Nigeria
- North Macedonia
- Norway
- Oman
- Pakistan
- Panama
- Paraguay
- Peru
- Philippines
- Poland
- Portugal
- Qatar
- Romania
- Russia
- Rwanda
- San Marino (San Marino)
- Saudi Arabia
- Senegal
- Serbia
- Seychelles
- Slovenia
- Slovakia
- South Africa
- South Korea
- Spain
- Sri Lanka
- Sudan
- Sweden
- Switzerland
- Tanzania
- Thailand
- Togo
- Tunisia
- Turkey
- Turkmenistan
- Uganda
- Ukraine
- United Arab Emirates
- United Kingdom
- United States
- Uruguay
- Uzbekistan
- Venezuela
- Vietnam

== Non-resident consulates-general ==
Resident in Marseille, France unless otherwise stated.

- Switzerland
- Turkey
- United Kingdom
- United States

== See also ==
- Foreign relations of Monaco
- List of diplomatic missions of Monaco
- List of ambassadors to Monaco
