= List of diplomatic missions of Monaco =

This is a list of diplomatic missions of Monaco. The Principality of Monaco, despite its small size, is a full member of the United Nations, and has its own embassies abroad, including 114 honorary consulates (not mentioned below) .

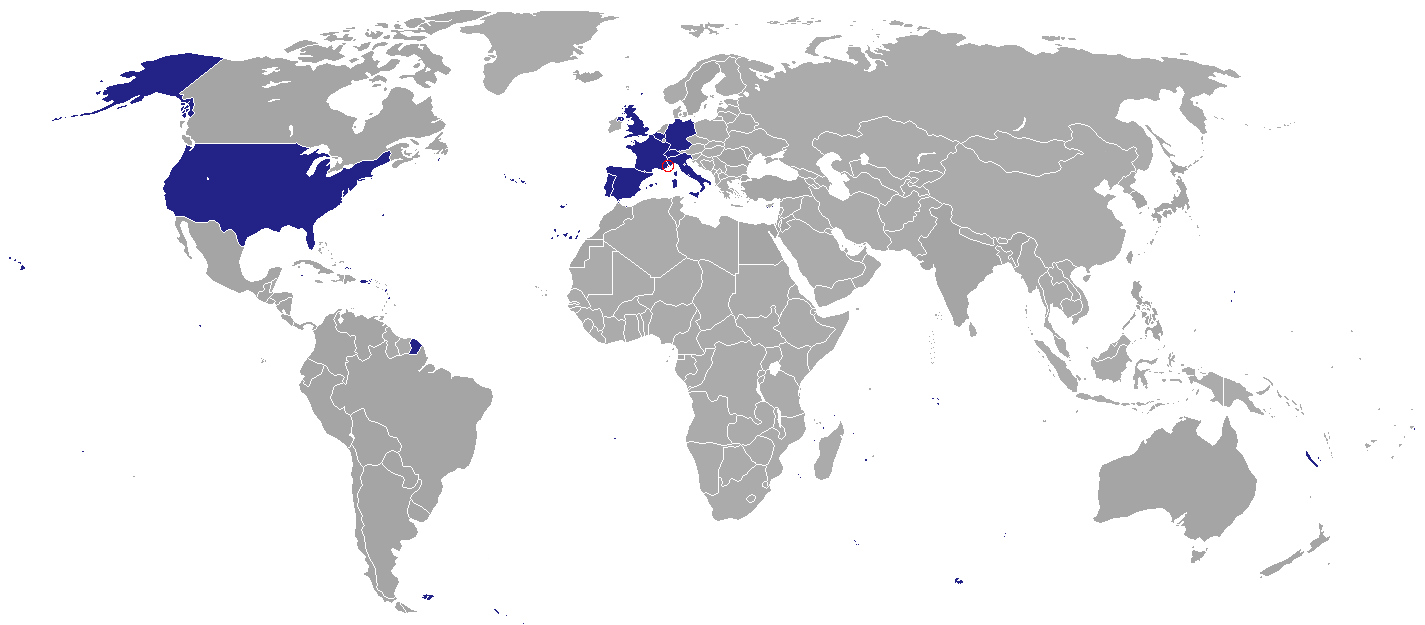
Diplomatic missions of Monaco

== Current missions ==
=== Americas ===
Host country	Host city	Mission	Concurrent accreditation	Ref.
United States	Washington, D.C.	Embassy	Countries: Canada; Mexico	
United States	New York City	Consulate-General	Countries: Canada; Mexico	

=== Europe ===
Host country	Host city	Mission	Concurrent accreditation	Ref.
Belgium	Brussels	Embassy	Countries: Luxembourg; Netherlands; International Organizations: European Union	
France	Paris	Embassy	Countries: Andorra; International Organizations: Francophonie	
Germany	Berlin	Embassy	Countries: Austria; Poland	
Holy See	Rome	Embassy	Countries: Sovereign Military Order of Malta	
Italy	Rome	Embassy	Countries: Croatia; Malta; Romania; San Marino; Slovenia; International Organizations: Food and Agriculture Organization	
Portugal	Lisbon	Embassy		
Spain	Madrid	Embassy		
Switzerland	Bern	Embassy	Countries: Liechtenstein	
United Kingdom	London	Embassy	Countries: Kazakhstan	

=== Multilateral organizations ===
Organization	Host city	Host country	Mission	Concurrent accreditation	Ref.
Council of Europe	Strasbourg	France	Permanent Representative		
United Nations	Geneva	Switzerland	Permanent Mission		
United Nations	New York City	United States	Permanent Mission	Countries: Guatemala	
UNESCO	Paris	France	Permanent Mission		

== Gallery ==
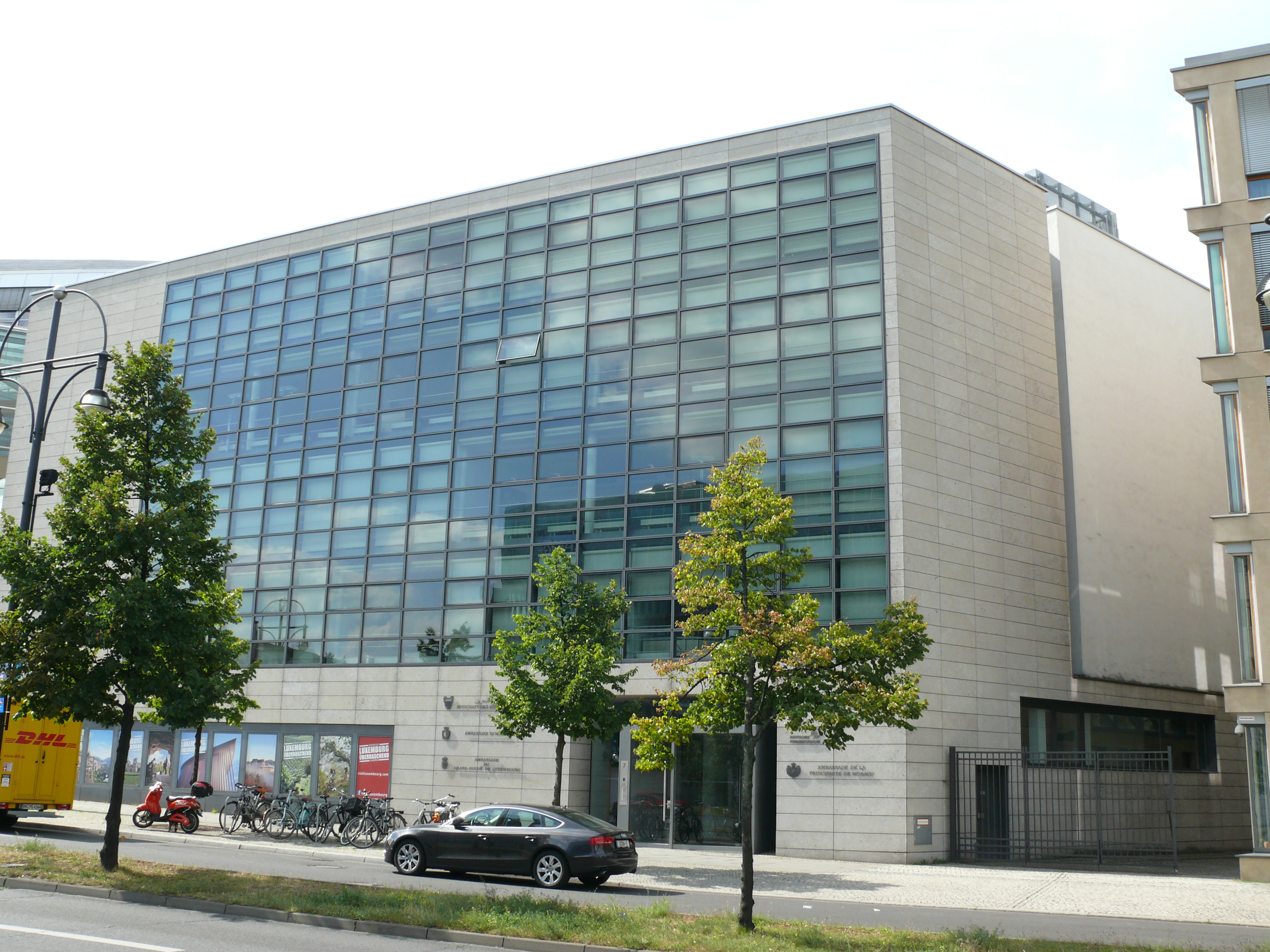
Embassy in Berlin

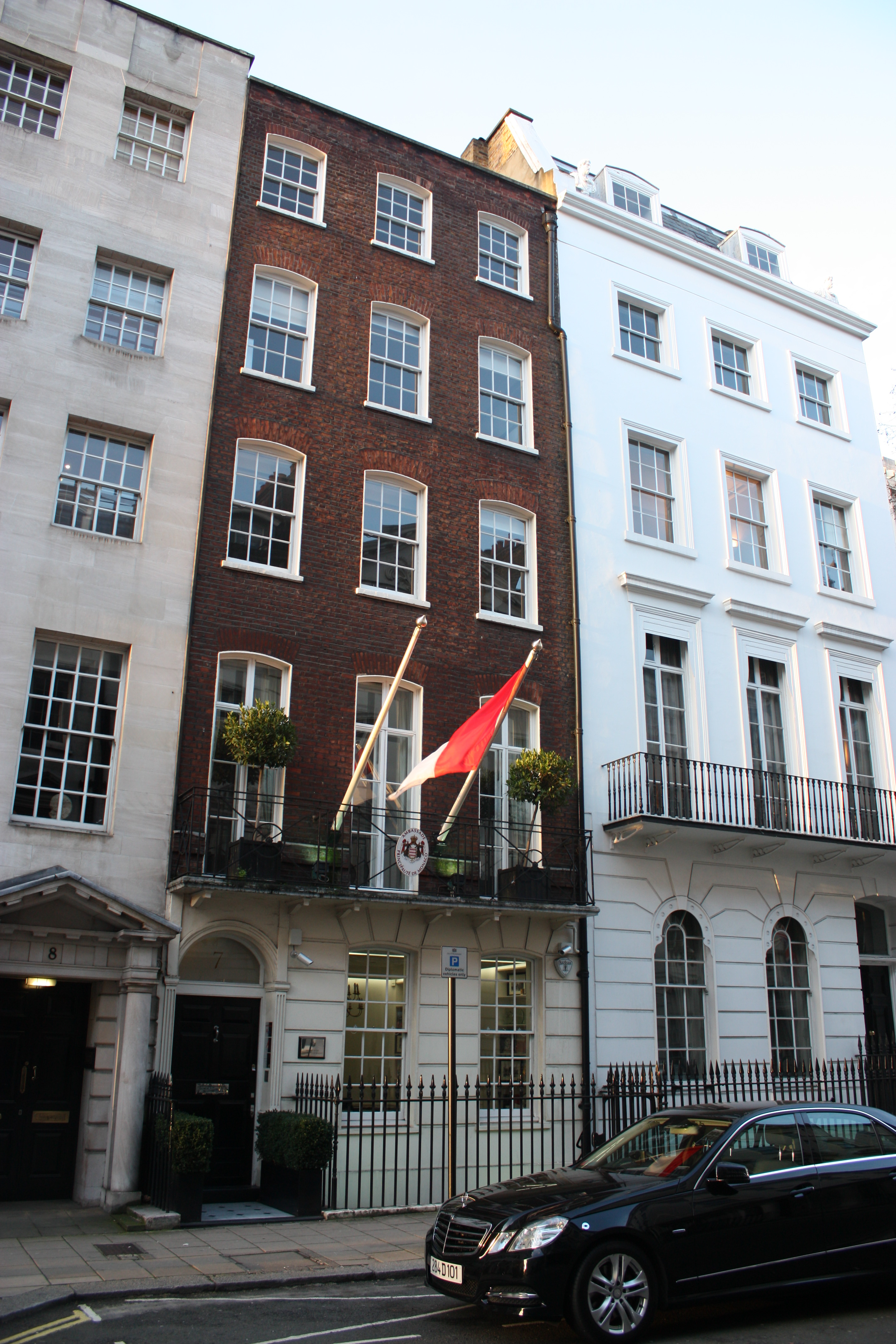
Embassy in London

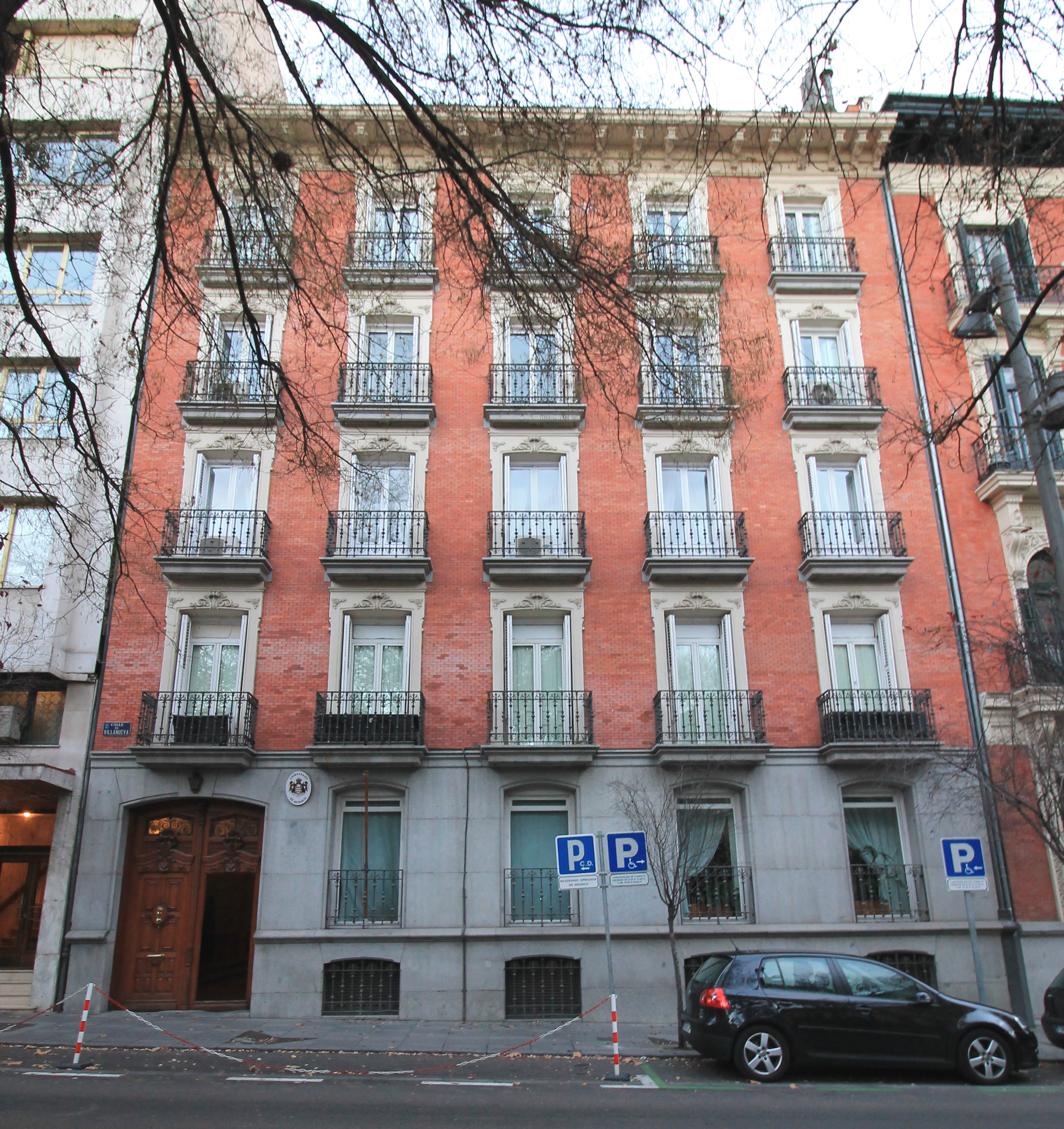
Embassy in Madrid

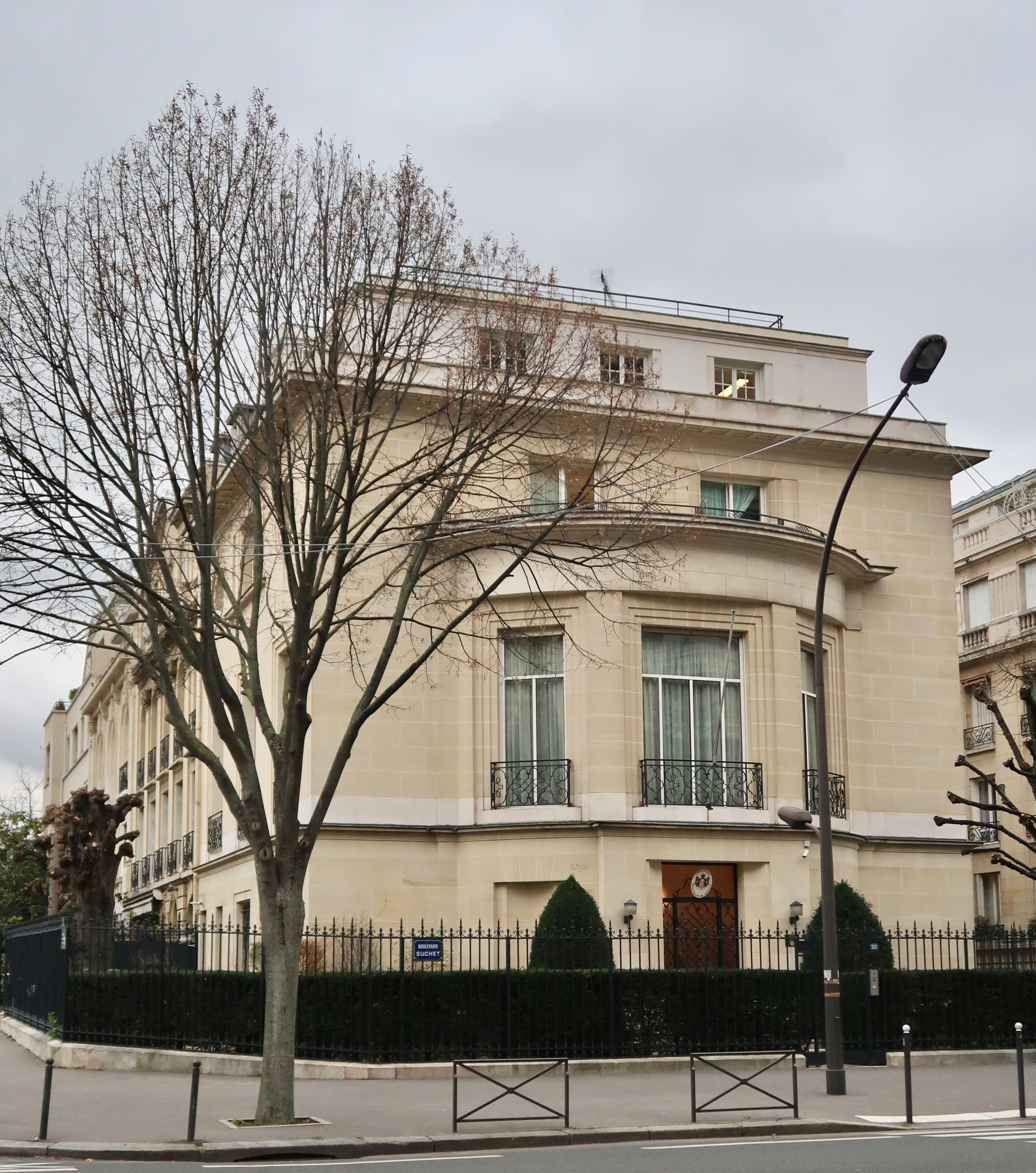
Embassy in Paris

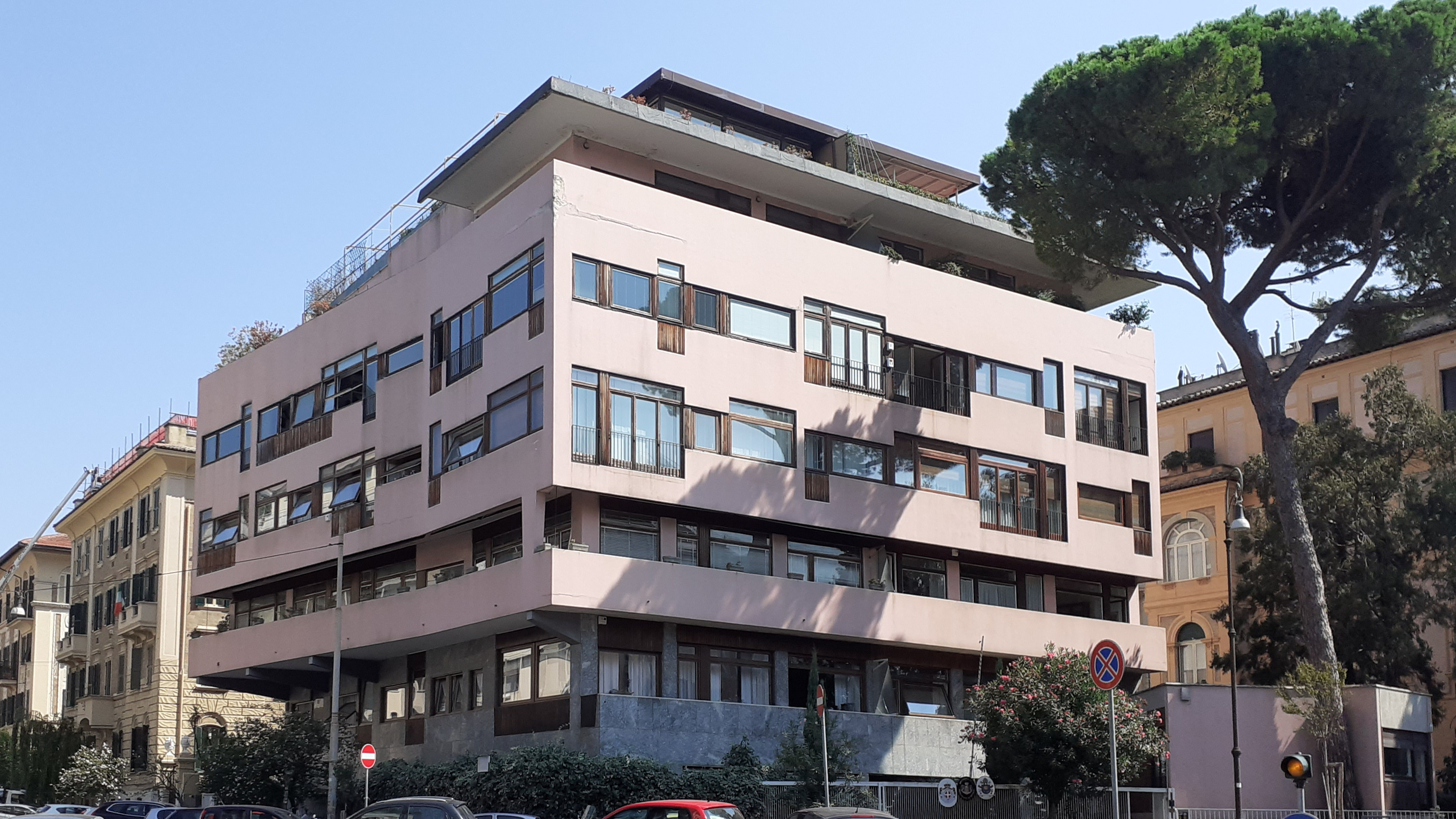
Embassy to the Holy See in Rome

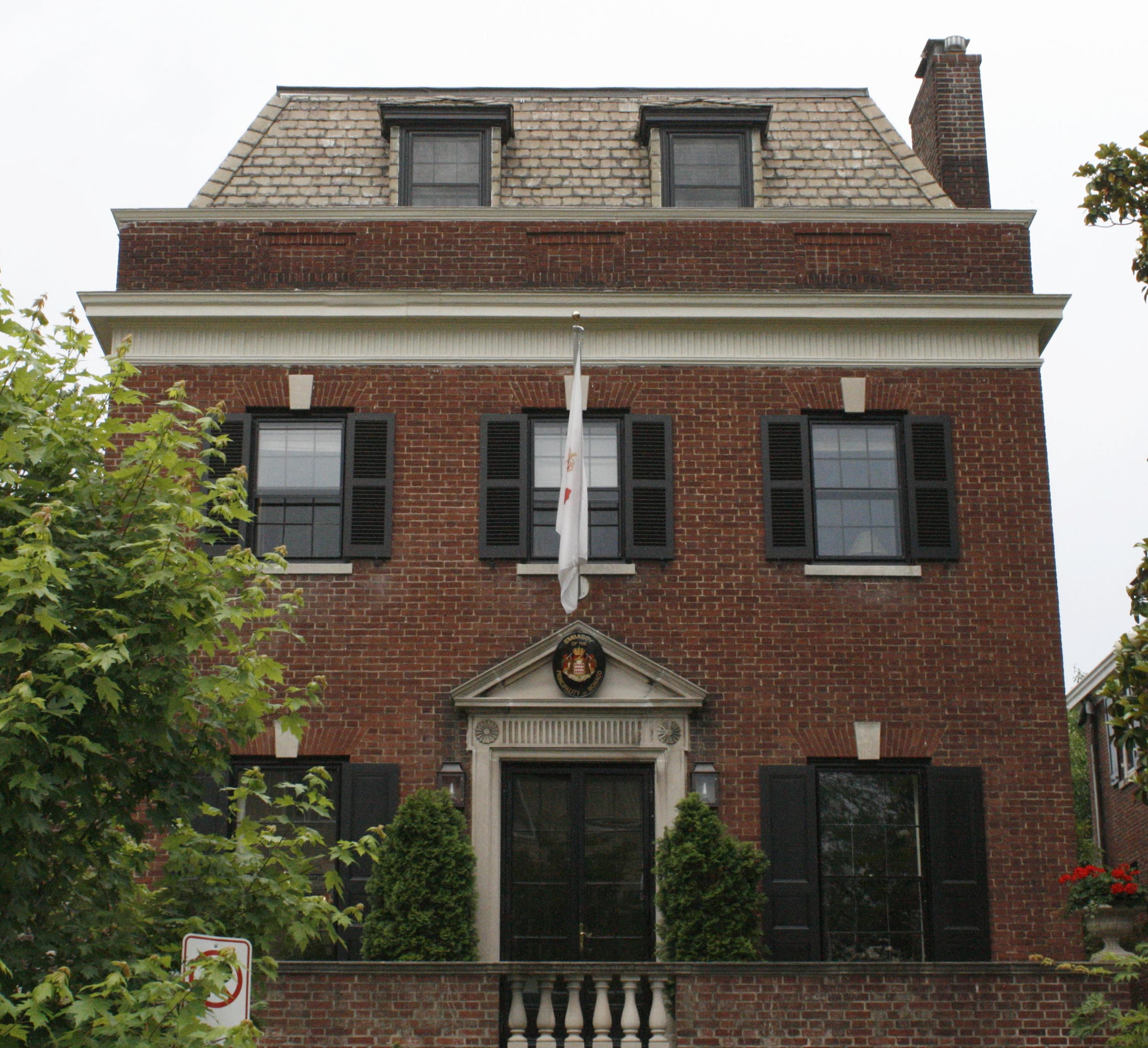
Residence of the Embassy in Washington, D.C.

== See also ==
- Foreign relations of Monaco
- List of diplomatic missions in Monaco
