= Eduards Stiprais =

Latvian diplomat

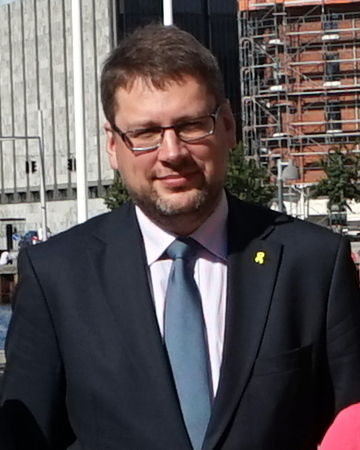

European Union Ambassador to Uzbekistan
- In office 2016–2020
- Preceded by: Yuri Sterk

Permanent Representative of Latvia to the European Union
- In office 2004–2007

Personal details
- Born: 19 February 1969 (age 57) Riga, Latvia
- Party: Latvian Way
- Education: University of Latvia
- Occupation: diplomat

Eduards Stiprais (born February 19, 1969, in Riga, Latvia) is a Latvian diplomat who served as Permanent Representative of Latvia to the European Union from 2004 until 2007. Between 2004 and 2009, he served as Head of EU Delegation to the Republic of Uzbekistan. He also served as Ambassador of the Republic of Latvia to the United Kingdom, and since 2020 he serves as Ambassador of the Republic of Latvia to France.

== Education and career ==
In 1993 Eduards Stiprais graduated from the Faculty of Economics of the University of Latvia. Since then he has worked in the Ministry of Foreign Affairs of Latvia.

From 1995 to 1998, he held the positions of Second and First Secretary of the Mission of the Republic of Latvia to the European Union.

In 2004 he was appointed Permanent Representative of Latvia to the European Union.

In 2009, he was the head of the Office of the President of the Republic of Latvia in Ukraine and was later appointed Ambassador of the Republic of Latvia to the United Kingdom.

Between 2013 and 2016, he served as Deputy State Secretary of the Ministry of Foreign Affairs.

From 2016 to 2020 he was the head of the EU delegation in Uzbekistan.

In 2020, he was appointed Ambassador of Latvia to France.

He is a member of the Latvian Way party since 1993.

Stiprais is Commander of the Three Stars Order of the Republic of Latvia. In 2009, he received an Order of Merit of Ukraine, Second Class.
