= Jolanta Balčiūnienė =

Lithuanian diplomat

Jolanta Balčiūnienė (born October 16, 1962) is a Lithuanian diplomat who currently serves as Lithuanian representative to United Nations Education, Scientific and Cultural Organization (UNESCO). She had served as Lithuanian ambassador to France and Italy.

== Education ==
Balčiūnienė studied philosophy majoring in literature and French language at Vilnius University 1988 and from 1990 to 1991 she studied international relations at the International Institute of Public Administration in Paris before proceeding to the French National School of Administration from 1993 to 1995.

== Career ==
Balčiūnienė worked as a translator from 1989 to 1990 and a consultant to the Chairman of the Supreme Council – Reconstituent Seimas between 1991 and 1992. From 1996 to 2000, she again was the adviser on foreign affairs to Chairman of Seimas Vytautas Landsbergis. In 1993, she joined the French Embassy in Lithuania as an economic consultant. She was appointed chief specialist of the policy and analysis department of the Ministry of National Defense of Lithuania in 1995 and served as adviser in the bilateral relations department of the Lithuanian Ministry of Foreign Affairs from 2000 to 2002 before her transfer to the Lithuanian Embassy in France as an adviser from 2002 to 2005. She was appointed minister plenipotentiary and served at the permanent representation of Lithuania to the European Union before her redeployment to Eastern neighborhood policy department of the Ministry of Foreign Affairs as a deputy director in 2008. She was appointed ambassador in 2009 and deployed to France and Morocco where served until 2014 (concurrently, she served as the ambassador to the Principality of Andorra since 2010). In 2014, she transferred to Italy and served there until 2017.

== Awards ==
Balčiūnienė received the following state awards:

- Royal Norwegian Order of Merit, 1998
- Order of the French Legion of Honor, 2001
- Commander's Cross of the Order for Merits to Lithuania, 2003
- French Ordre national du Mérite, 2014
