= Works of art in The Aesthetics of Resistance =

Works of art noted in The Aesthetics of Resistance

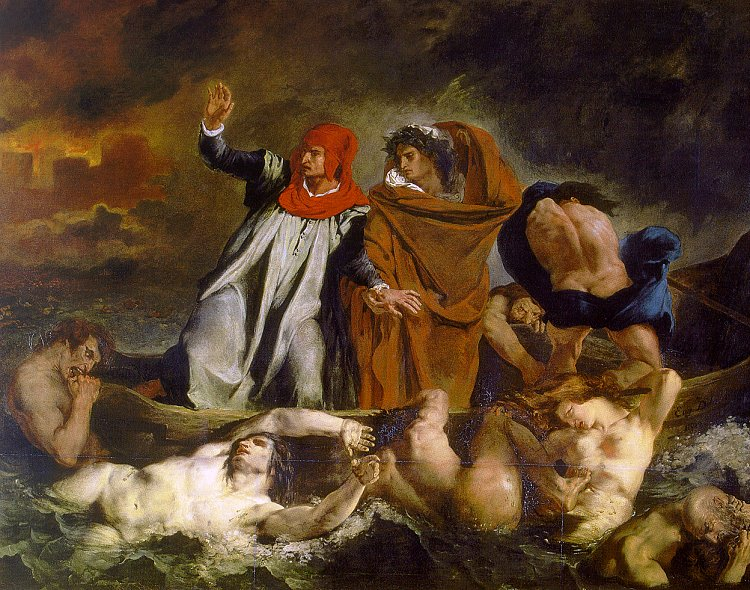
Eugène Delacroix The Barque of Dante, one of over 100 works of art mentioned and at the same time a symbol of the influence of Dante's Divine Comedy

The works of art in The Aesthetics of Resistance are those included in Peter Weiss' novel The Aesthetics of Resistance. They form a kind of musée imaginaire (imagined museum) with more than a hundred named artists and just as many artworks, mainly of the visual arts and literature, but also of music and the performing arts. Peter Weiss wrote the three-volume novel, which runs to around 1000 pages, between 1971 and 1981. The plot is set between 1936 and 1945, and is located in Nazi Berlin, Spain during the Civil War, Paris before World War II and Stockholm as one of the places of refuge for the German exiles. The characters are based on real personalities, the main protagonists organising themselves in the resistance group known as the Red Orchestra. Representations of artists, works of art, their contexts and backgrounds are included in the plot line and form a web of mutual interconnections. The reception takes place in multi-layered reflections by the protagonists of the novel, through the reference to historical and political events, to mythological set pieces, to artists' biographies, to dream images or in critical questioning.

== List of artworks ==
The following list contains about one hundred works of art in the visual arts, literature and music that are extensively discussed, named, enumerated or included in Aesthetics of Resistance. In addition, motifs of mythology as well as events and places directly related to Peter Weiss' reception of art are included in the list. The artworks and backgrounds are largely arranged in the order in which they appear in the book. Exceptions are motifs that receive a more detailed description after a brief mention on later pages. The hundred or so artists featured in the novel can be found in the list of artists in Aesthetics of Resistance.

By clicking on the arrow in the table headings, the list can be sorted differently; a detailed description of the sorting options can be found at the end of the table.

Illustration / Chronology
Artist / Origin
Work / Classification
Entry in the novel

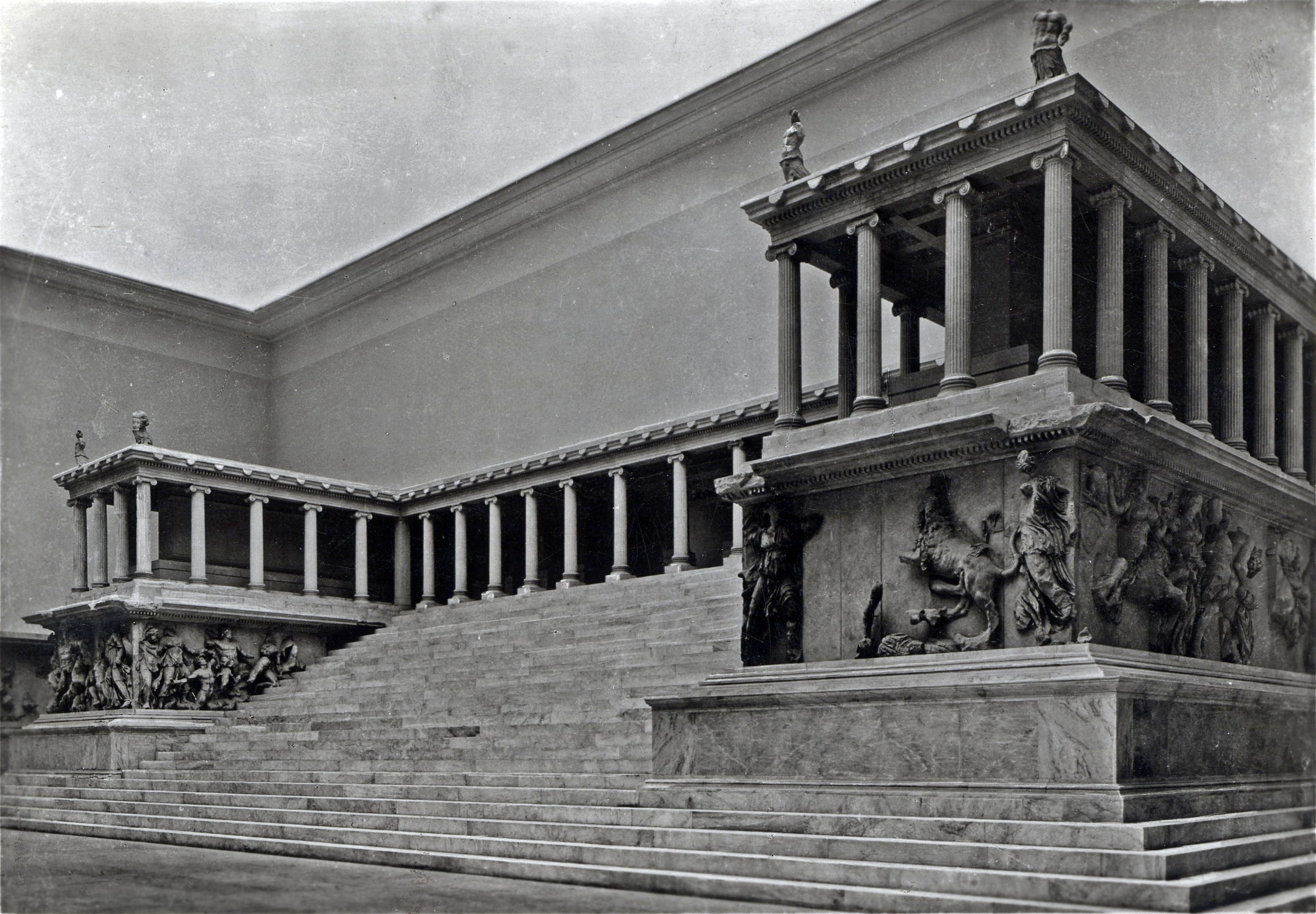

Ancient
Pergamon Altar first half of the 2nd century BC.
Berlin, Pergamon Museum

Building
The Pergamon Altar is a monumental altar that was erected under Eumenes II near the Asia Minor city of Pergamon. After excavations by the German engineer Carl Humann from 1878 onwards, it was brought to Berlin and exhibited in a specially constructed museum building. The altar is a good 35 metres wide and 33 metres deep; the base is surrounded by a high relief depicting the Battle of the giants against the Olympic gods.

- AedW I, pp. 7–15, 36–53, 316 f., 328;
- AedW III, pp. 20, 171 f., 187, 267 f.
The description of the Pergamon Altar and the gigantomachy it depicts forms the introduction to the novel. The protagonists question the viewpoint of the observer: they see the victorious gods as symbols of the rulers who had the monumental work of art created by exploited people, war is stylised into a myth. They themselves identify with the defeated children of the Gaia and discuss the role of Heracles. This is followed by reflections on the significance of the Pergamon Altar in the history of Pergamon, the excavation of the altar and the transfer of the art treasures to Germany. One conclusion of the first-person narrator is

that works such as those that come from Pergamon would have to be interpreted over and over again until a reversal was won and the earth-born awoke from darkness and slavery and showed themselves in their true appearance.

Further lines of thought on the Pergamon Altar are taken up in the course of the novel and conclude the work as a whole with the last chapter, so that this motif frames the novel, as it were.

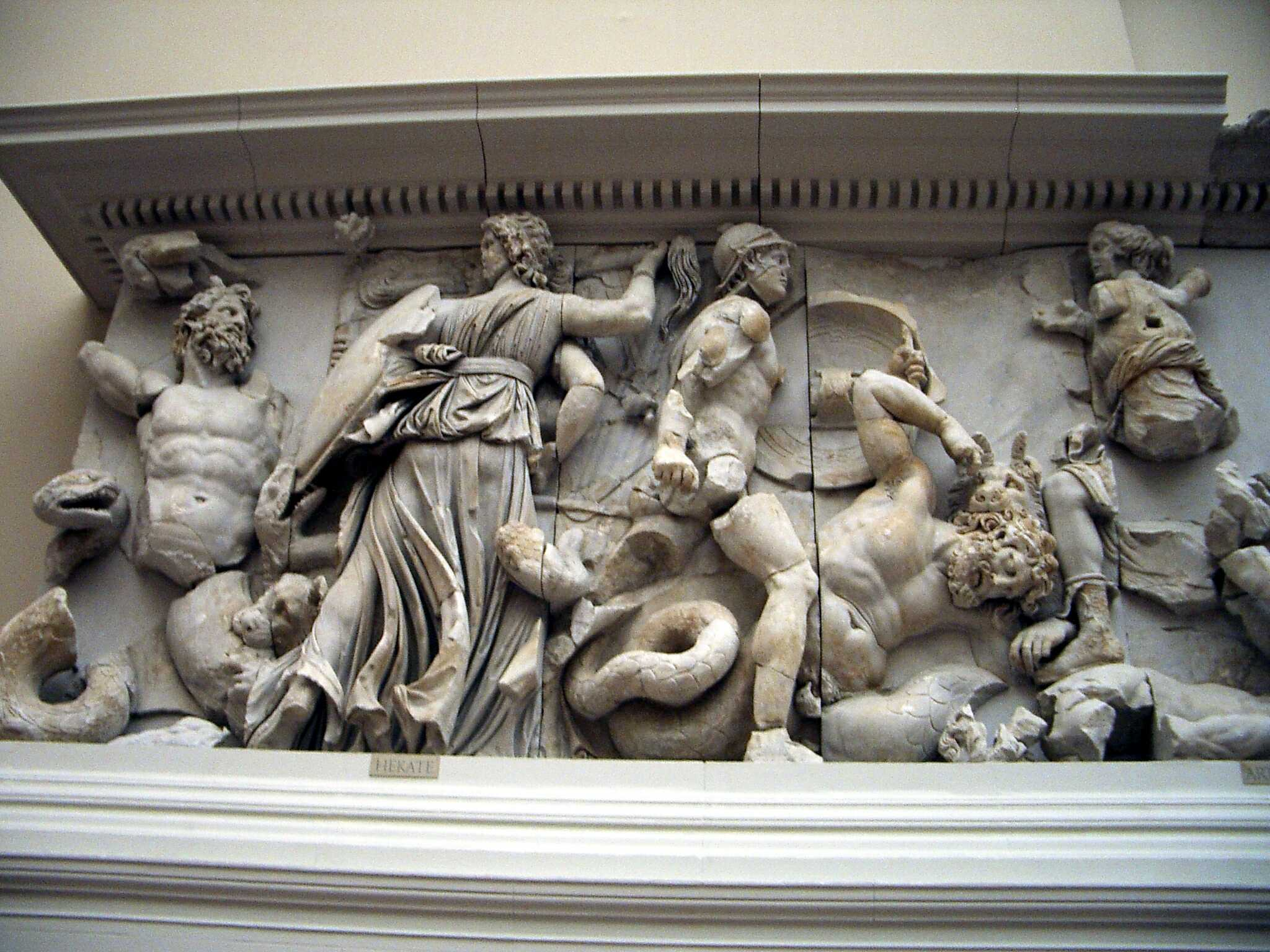

Greek mythology
Gigantomachy

Mythology
The Gigantomachy is the battle of the giants, the children of the earth mother Ge, against the Olympian gods described in Greek mythology by Homer, Apollodor and others. With the help of the mortal hero Heracles, the gods were victorious.

- AedW I, p. 7 ff.
The depiction and reception of the Gigantomachy occupies a central space with the description of the Pergamon Altar in the introduction and is taken up in detail several times in the course of the novel. It stands as a symbol for the struggle of the resisters against fascism.

With stones only (...) they can defend themselves against the armoured and heavily armed, they kneel, they crawl, they break and fall into the cracked pavement, exposed to water cannons, gas grenades and machine guns. She saw the battle in our occupied city, our occupied country, and it did not help that Ge begged for mercy for her son Alkyoneus, he was in Athena's power, the killing bite of the snake in his chest was not enough for her, she wanted complete destruction. Condemned to annihilation were the weaponless, who gathered behind barricades, from the chosen ones, who had acquired imposing names and spread the word all around that they were unbeatable, that they had the highest world order in mind.

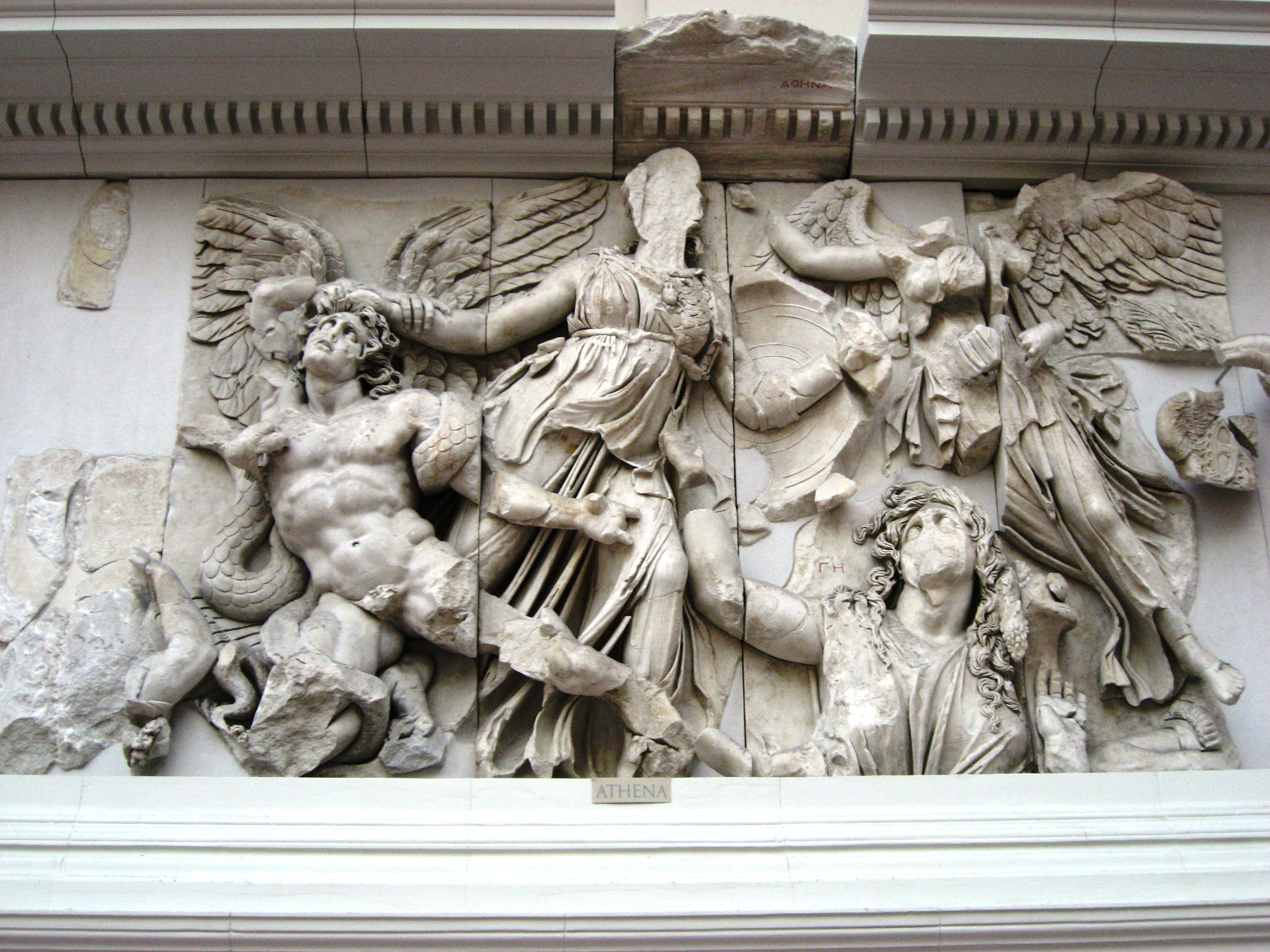

Greek mythology
Gaia

Mythology The goddess Gaia is the earth mother or personified earth of Greek mythology.

- AedW I, p. 10 ff.
- AedW III, p. 20
The motif of the Gaia becomes the figure of identification for the protagonists:

She had brought forth Uranus, the sky, Pontos, the sea, and all the mountains. She had given birth to the giants, Titans, Cyclopes and Erinyes. This was our race. We surveyed the history of the earthly.

The image is taken up again in Book 3, when the first-person narrator recognises the face of the Gaia on his sick mother.

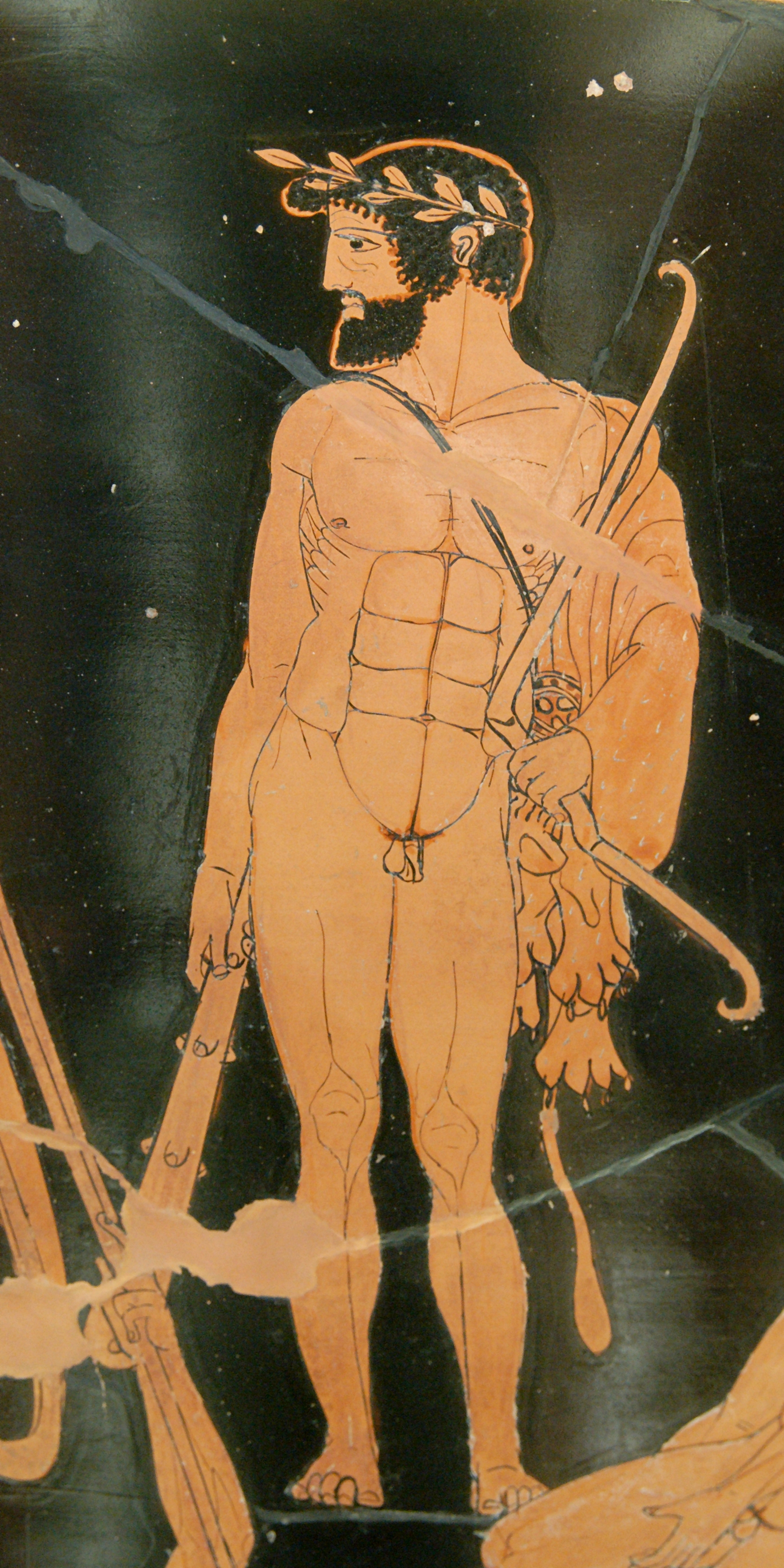

Greek mythology
Heracles

Mythology
Heracles or Hercules is a hero of Greek mythology famous for his strength, who was admitted to Olympus as an immortal. The attribute depicted with him, besides his club, bow and quiver, is the skin of the Nemean lion, which according to legend he defeated in battle.

- AedW I, pp. 18–25, 62, 314 ff.
- AedW III, pp. 169, 267 f. and others
The motif of Herakles is a central, recurring simile and stands as a critically questioned symbol for the oppressed or the working class. The absence of his figure from the Pergamon Altar leads to the recurring element of the quest for Heracles, which comes to a close at the end of the novel.

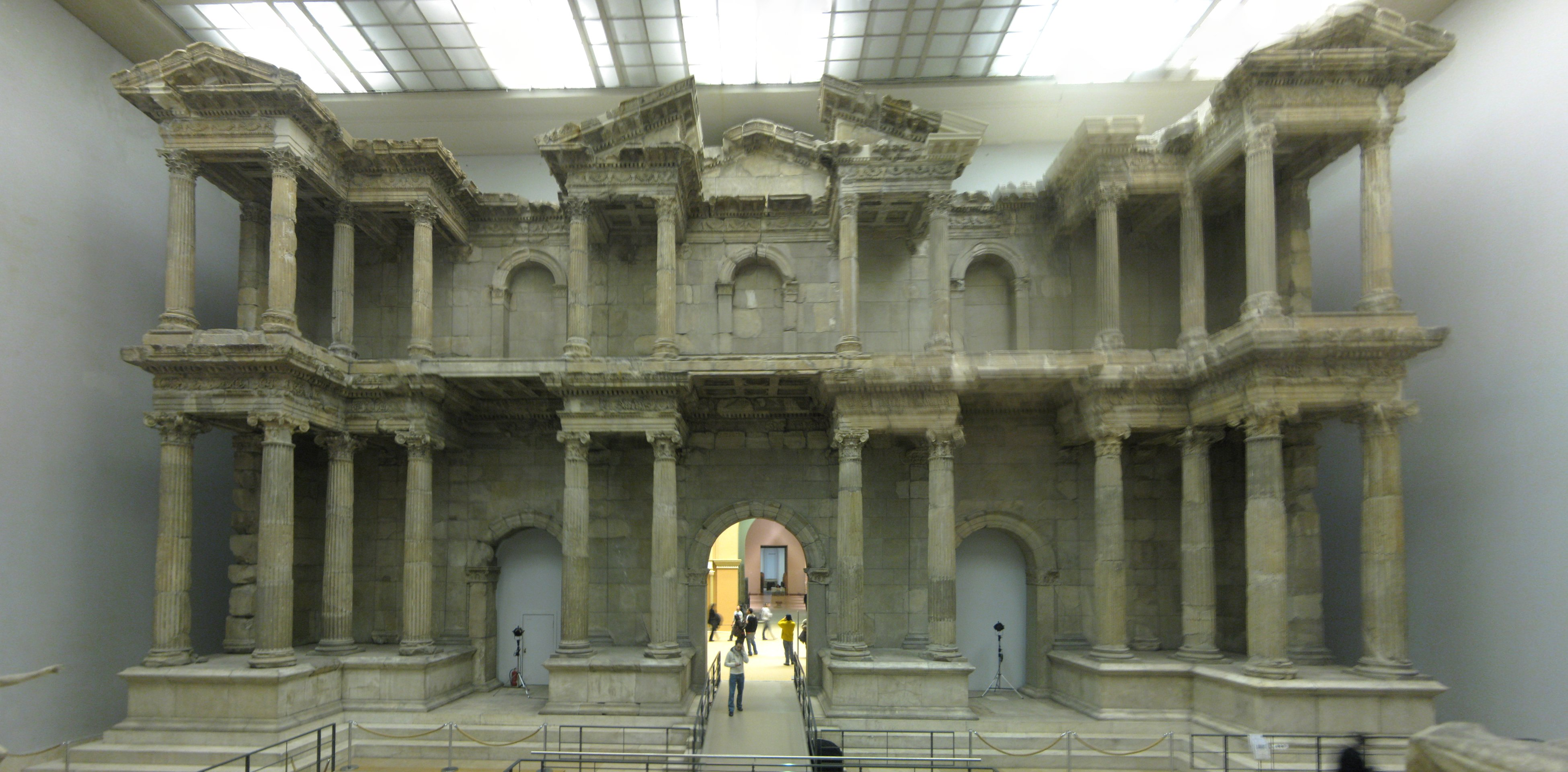

Ancient
Market Gate of Miletus, around 120 BC

Pergamon Museum,

Building
The gate building is a Roman gate building from the Asia Minor city of Miletus, which has been in the possession of the Antikensammlung Berlin since 1903.

- AedW I, p. 15, 324 f., 327
The protagonists also visit this structure during their visit to the Pergamon Museum. The story of the city of Miletus is taken up again elsewhere in the novel in the portrayal of antiquity as a wealth-accumulating slaveholding society.

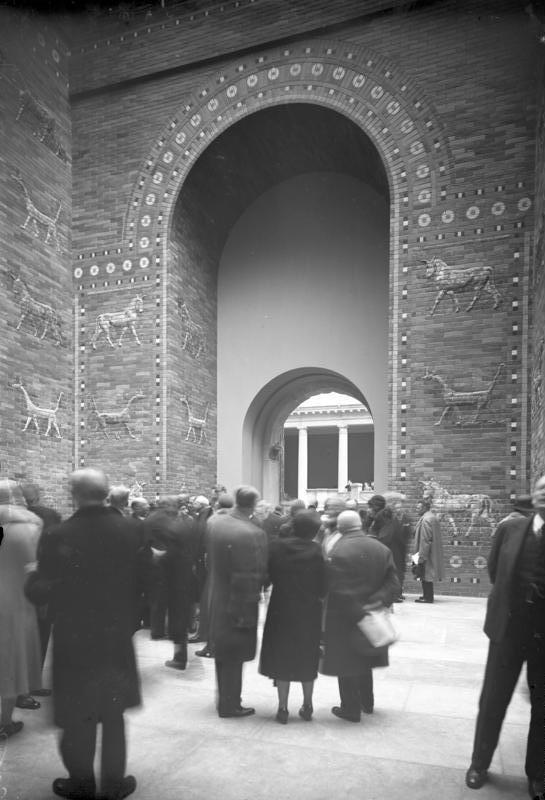

Antiquity
Ishtar Gate

6th century BC Berlin, Pergamon Museum

Building
The Ishtar Gate was one of the gates in the city wall of Babylon, one of the most important cities of antiquity, and was built under Nebuchadnezzar II. It has been in the collection of the Vorderasiatisches Museum Berlin in the south wing of the Pergamon Museum since 1930.

- AedW I, p. 15
During the visit to the Pergamon Museum, the protagonists walk along this building, going down a few more centuries.

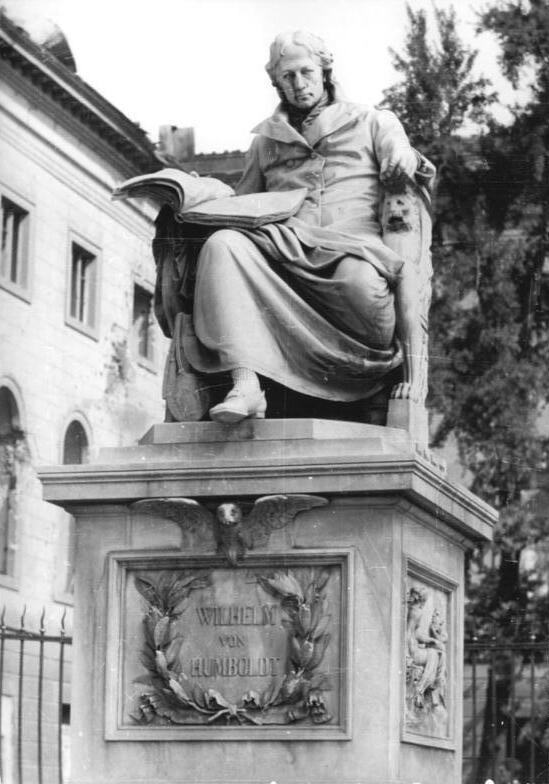

Paul Otto
Wilhelm von Humboldt Monument, 1883

marble statue
Unter den Linden, Berlin,

Fine arts Monument to Wilhelm von Humboldt (1765-1835), polymath who is regarded as a pioneer in cultural studies and education.

- AedW I, p. 15
As they walk through Berlin, the protagonists point to "the Humboldt brothers enthroned high in armchairs with griffin's feet, poring over open books".

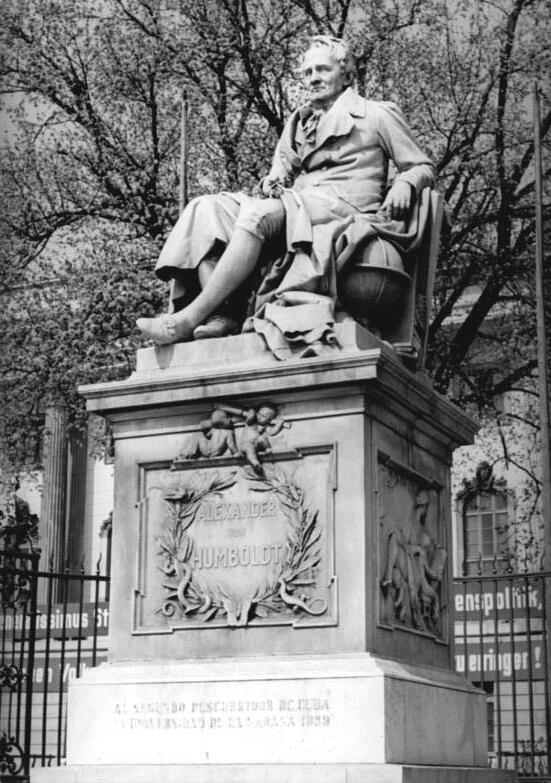

Reinhold Begas
Alexander von Humboldt Monument

1883, marble statue
Berlin, Unter den Linden

Fine arts Monument to Alexander von Humboldt (1769-1859), natural scientist, who was also called "world scientist" because of his erudition and extensive travels.

- AedW I, p. 15
As they walk through Berlin, the protagonists point to

the Humboldt brothers enthroned high in armchairs with griffin's feet, poring over open books

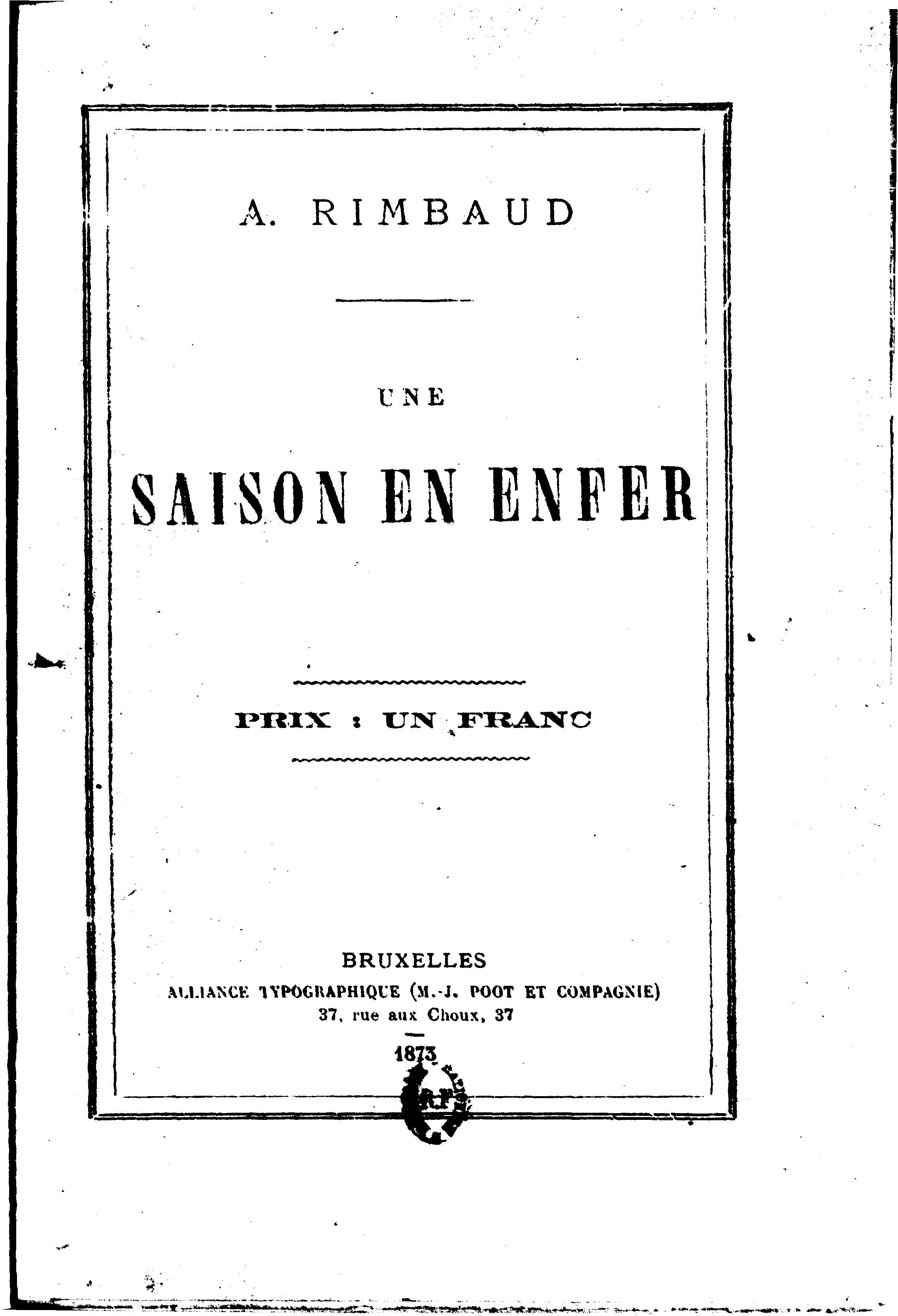

Arthur Rimbaud
A Season in Hell,1873

Collection of poems

Literature
This collection of poems is considered a highly poetic final reckoning with Rimbaud's own philosophy at the age of 19 when it was written, but it is also linguistically dense and difficult to access. Rimbaud's work strongly influenced 20th-century literature and art, particularly Expressionism and Surrealism.

- AedW I, p. 58; AedW II, p. 68
In the novel's questioning of what possibilities the poorly educated working class has to appropriate culture, the protagonists discuss the intelligibility of language in relation to its banalisation, using Rimbaud as an example:

Both are right (...), both the grip that tears the ground from under our feet and the endeavour to establish solid ground for the investigation of simple facts.

The work is mentioned once more in the second volume, when the first-person narrator seeks to get to know the city of Paris in the footsteps of various artists.

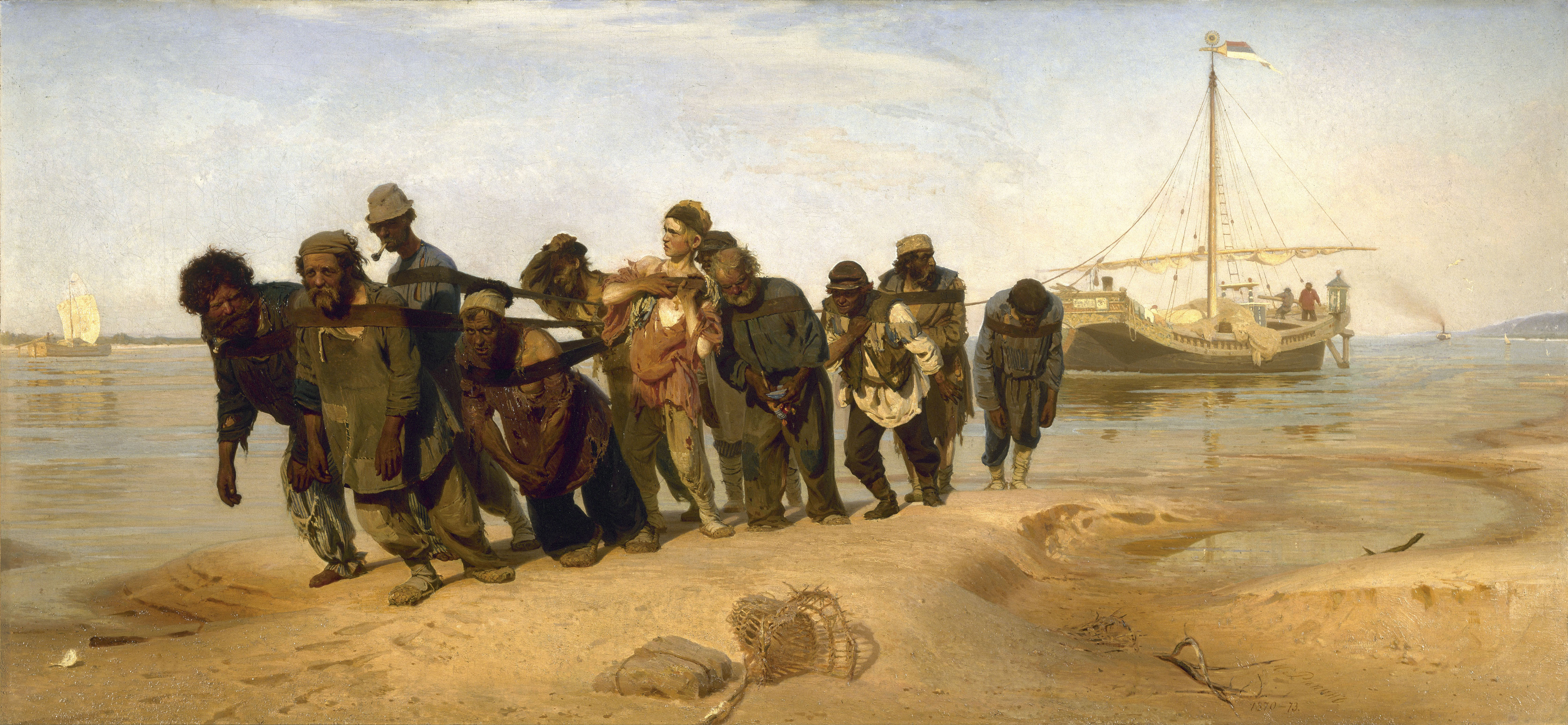

Ilya Repin
Barge Haulers on the Volga 1870

State Russian Museum, Saint Petersburg

Fine Arts

- AedW I, p. 60
- Motif group: Work
as an example of Russian realism:

The faces of the ragged, bearded serfs, stomping barefoot or in torn sandals and straw boots through the shore sand, were extinguished, devoid of hope.

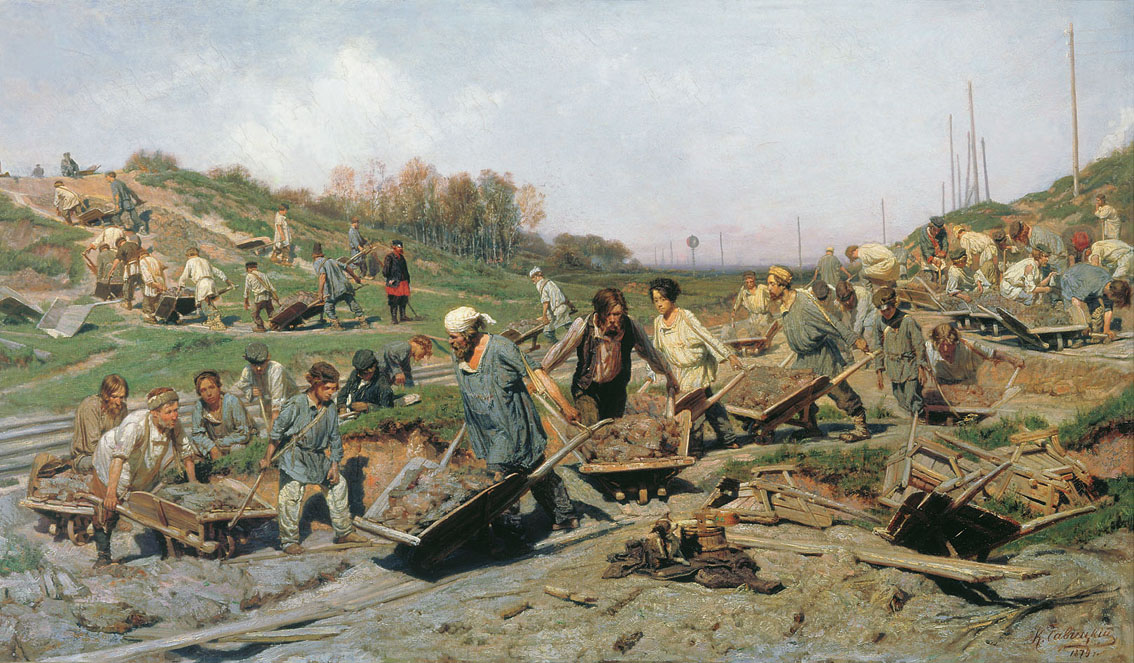

Konstantin Savitsky
Repairing the Railway 1874

Tretyakov Gallery, Moscow

Fine arts

- AedW I, p. 60
- Motif group: Work
as an example of Russian realism:

It was the year eighteen hundred seventy-four, when the road workers on the dusty embankment, watched over by soldiers, braced themselves over the fully laden carts. In the bleakness, the devaluation of their lives, they had never heard of the revolutions in France, of the Commune.

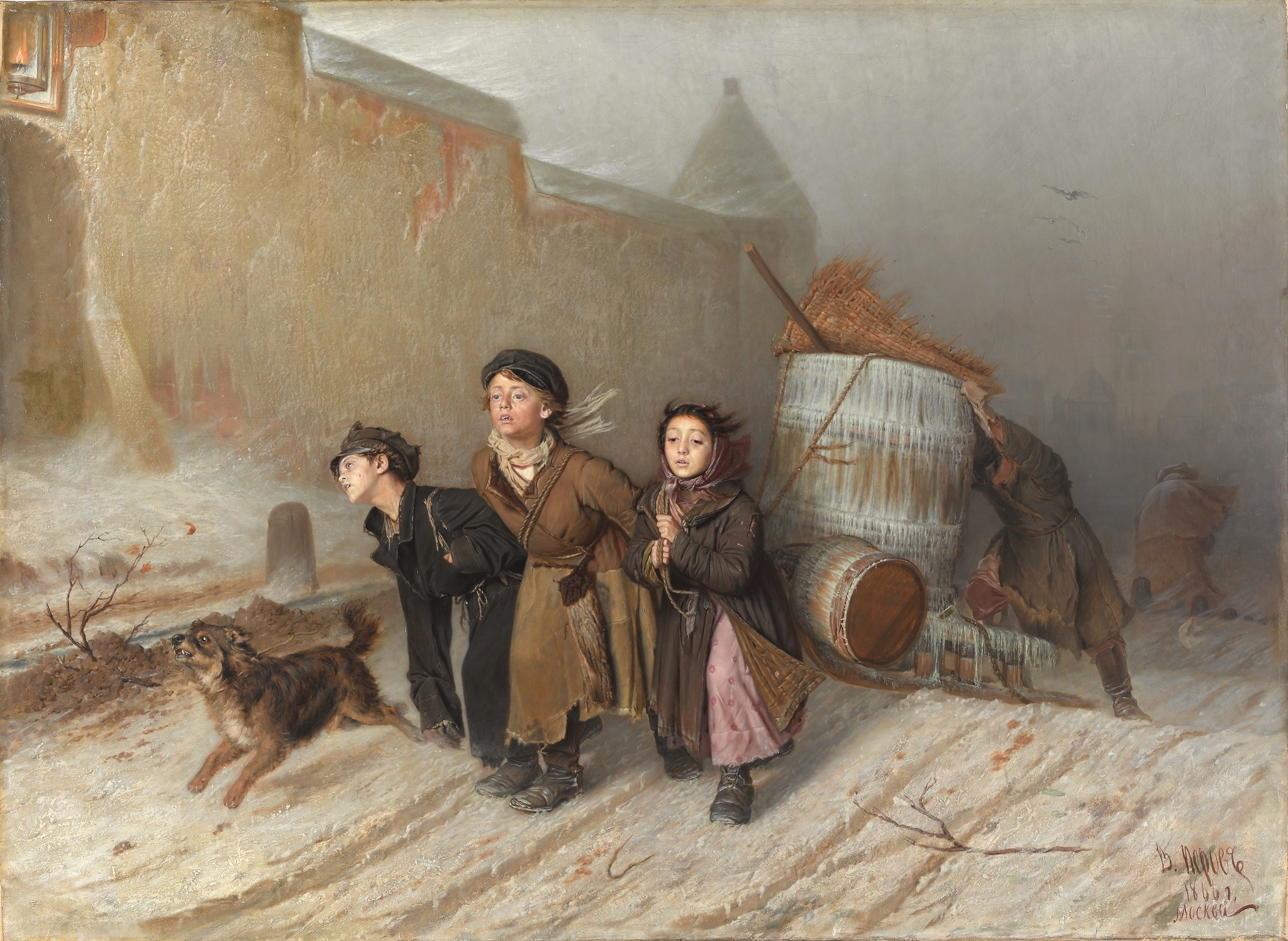

Wassili Perow
Troika 1866

Tretyakov Gallery, Moscow

Fine arts

- AedW I, p. 60
- Motif group: Work
as an example of Russian realism:

The children in front of the sleigh were emaciated, their features waxen, dull with exhaustion.

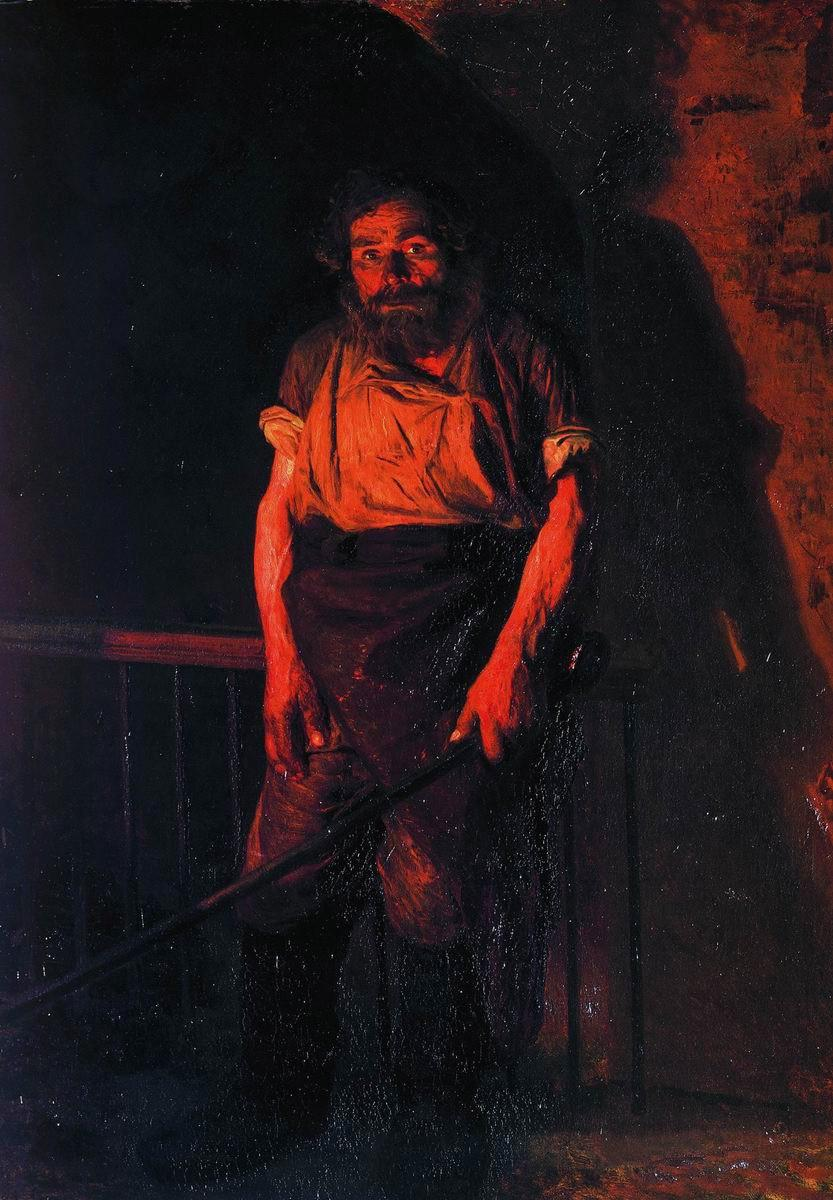

Nikolai Yaroshenko
The Stoker, 1878

Tretyakov Gallery, Moscow

Fine Arts

- AedW I, p. 60
- Motif group: Work
as an example of Russian realism:

(...) there was Yarosenko's stoker, scorched with red embers, slumped over, locked in the low furnace room, holding the poker in his swollen thick-veined hands.

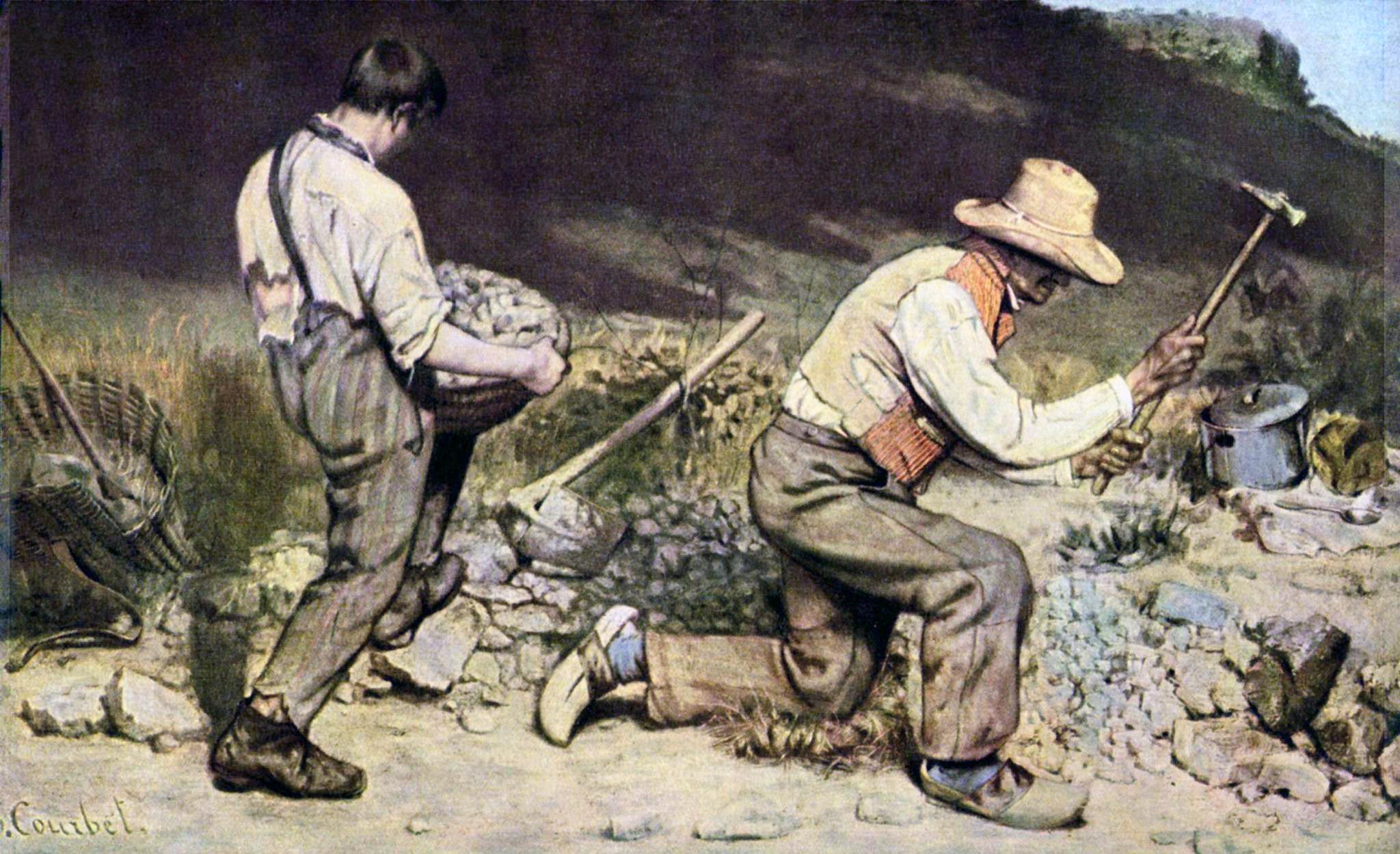

Gustave Courbet
The Stone Breakers 1849-50

formerly Dresden, Picture gallery; burnt

Fine arts

- AedW I, p. 60f.
- Motif group: Work
As an example of French realism:

Courbet's stone knockers were not granted relief either, but their work in the rubble was no longer marked by hopelessness.

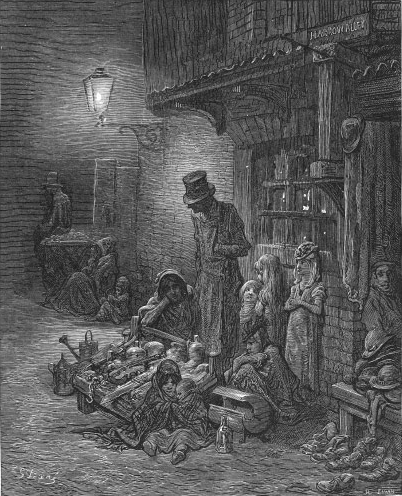

Gustave Doré
London: a pilgrimage

Illustrations in William Blanchard Jerrold's London: a Pilgrimage (1872), 180 wood engravings in all
Fine arts

- AedW I, p. 61
- Motif group: Work
representation of workers and their lives:

'... they were not, however, exposed to abandonment by the wet, but toiled in a living circle.

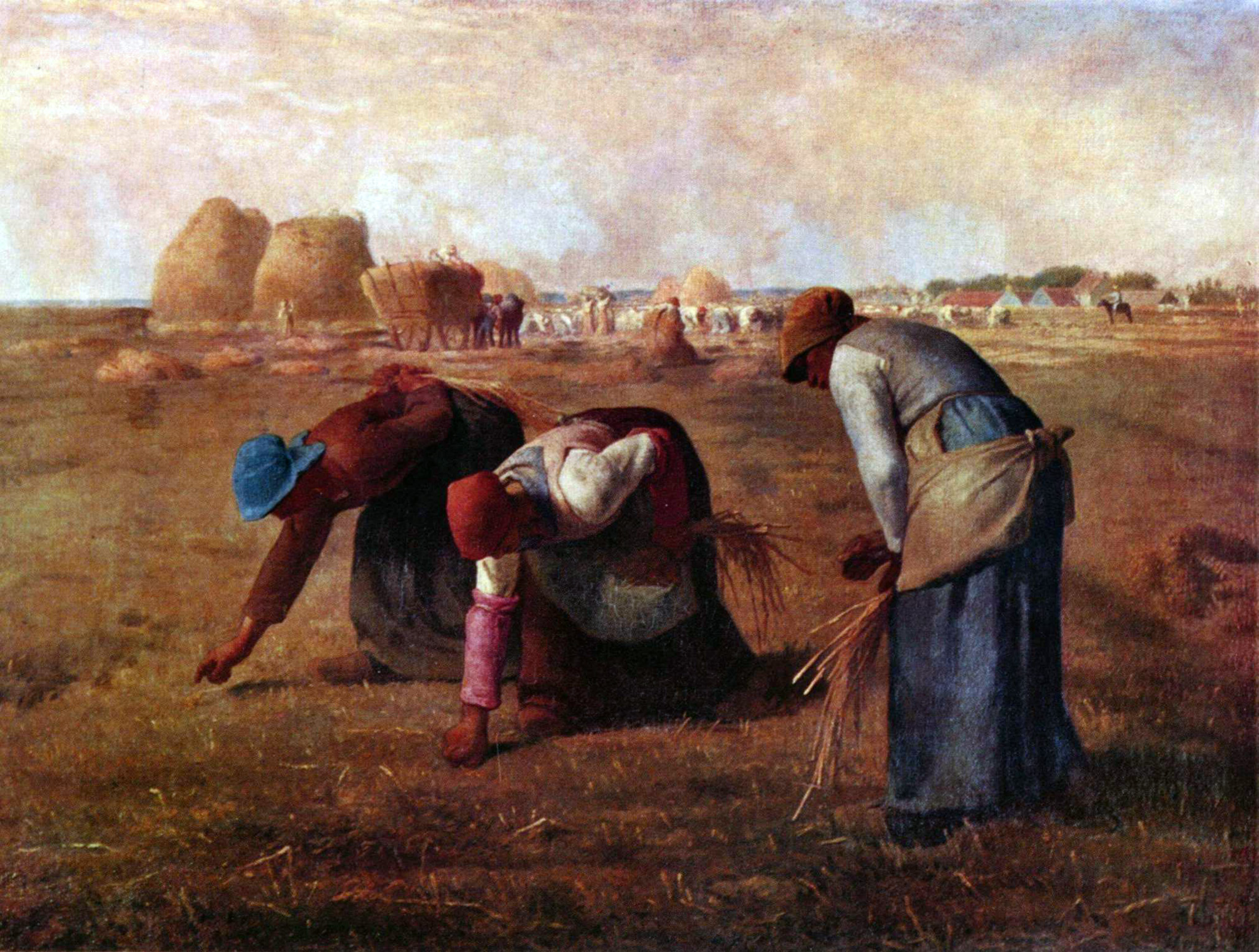

Jean-François Millet
The Gleaners, 1857

Musée d'Orsay, Paris

Fine arts

- AedW I, p. 61f.
- Motif group: Work
Description and interpretation of the painting as well as of the motif's background in connection with remarks on realism, in which working people are depicted in works of art and their images are elevated to the salons of society:

by taking the sweaty figures, with their earthy features, their loamy weight, away from where they had hitherto persevered anonymously, and placing them among the well-groomed portraits, the nymphs and shepherdesses, he did something that was tantamount to a revolutionary cause.

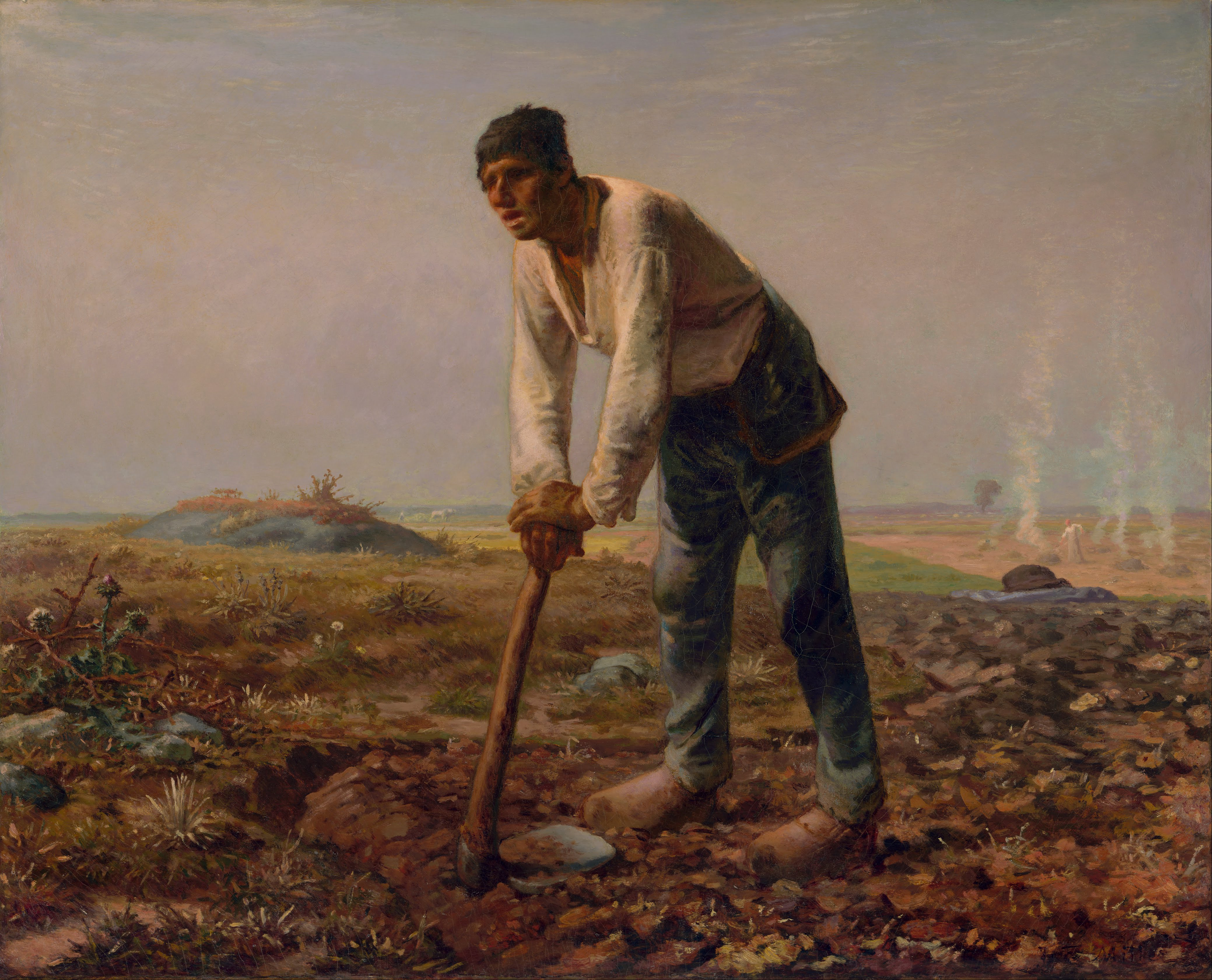

Jean-François Millet
Man with a Hoe, circa 1860 and circa 1862

J. Paul Getty Museum, Los Angeles

Fine arts

- AedW I, p. 62.
- Motif group: : Work
Description and interpretation of the painting as well as of the motif's background in connection with remarks on realism, in which working people are depicted in works of art and their images are elevated to the salons of society:

by taking the sweaty figures, with their earthy features, their loamy weight, away from where they had hitherto persevered anonymously, and placing them among the well-groomed portraits, the nymphs and shepherdesses, he did something that was tantamount to revolutionary concern.

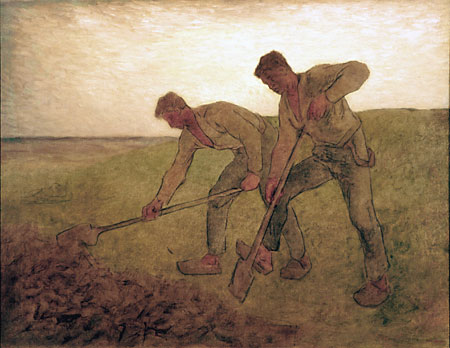

Jean-François Millet
the Digger 1850

Duluth Tweed Museum of Art, Minnesota

Fine arts

- AedW I, S. 62
- Motif group: : Work
Interpretation of the painting in connection with remarks on realism, in which working people are depicted in works of art and their likenesses are elevated to the salons of society.

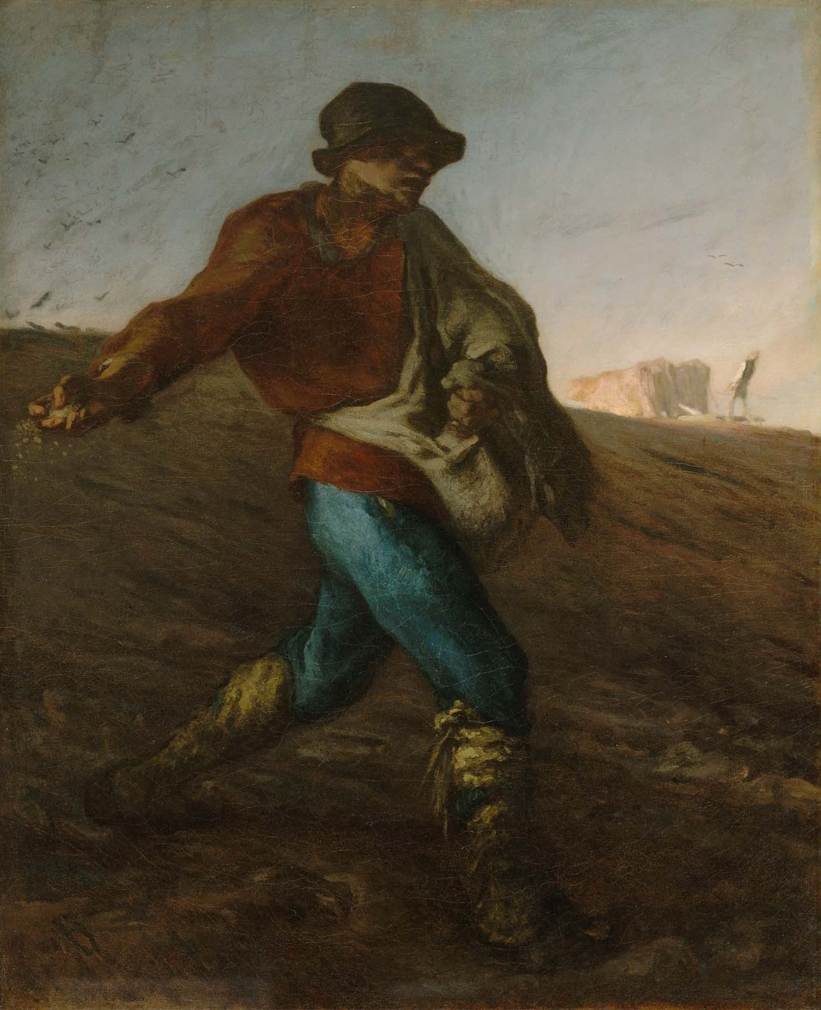

Jean-François Millet
The Sower, 1850

Museum of Fine Arts, Boston

Fine Arts

- AedW I, p. 62
- Motif group: Work
Interpretation of the painting in the context of remarks on realism, in which working people are depicted in works of art and their likenesses are elevated to the salons of society.

Jean-François Millet
The Angelus, 1857/1859

Louvre, Paris

Fine Arts

- AedW I, p. 62
- Motif group: Work
Interpretation of the painting in the context of remarks on realism, in which working people are depicted in works of art and their likenesses are elevated to the salons of society.

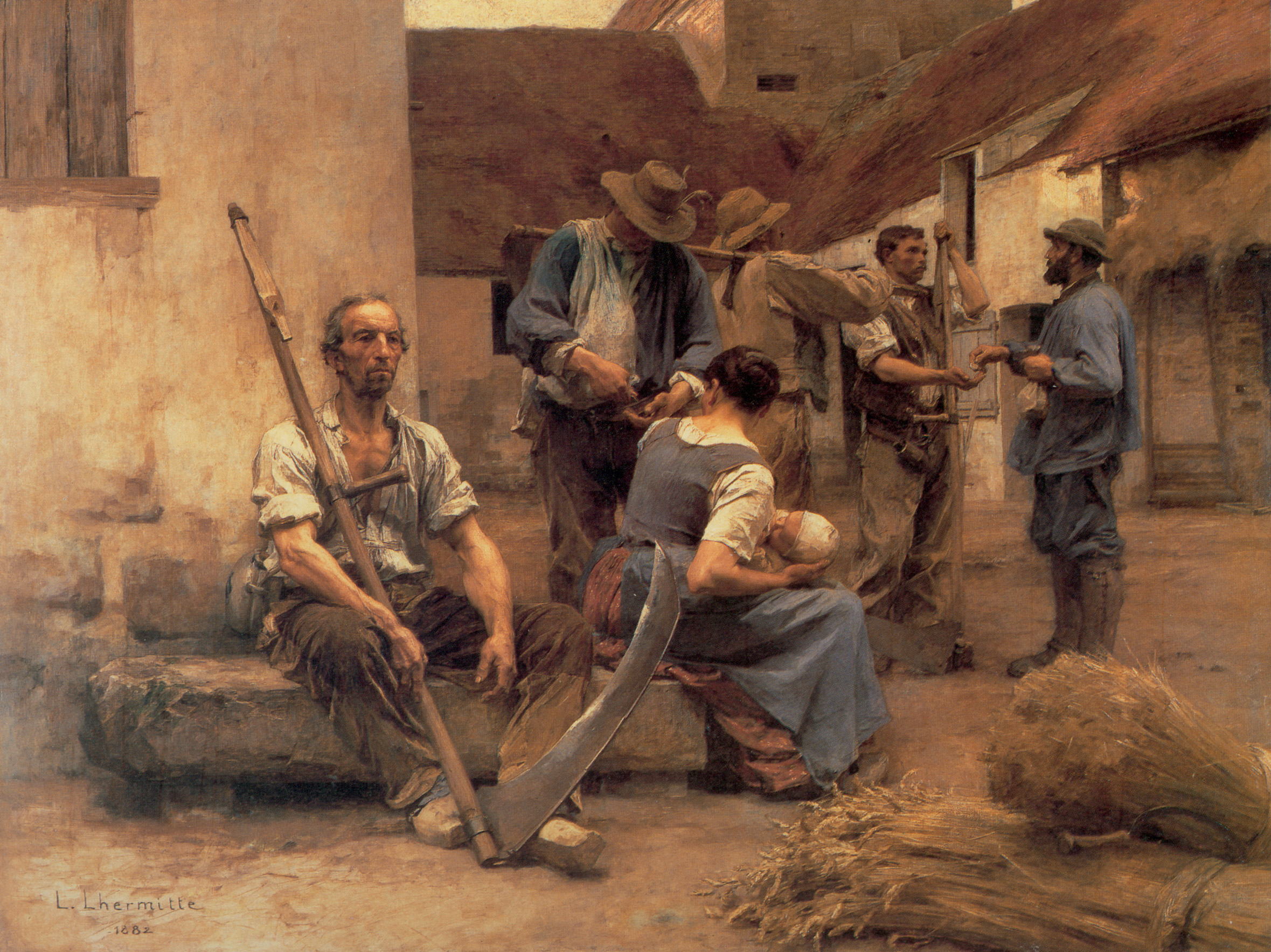

Léon Augustin Lhermitte
Paying the Harvesters, 1892

Musée d'Orsay, Paris

Fine arts

- AedW I, p. 63
- Motif group: Work
Listed as an example of the representation of the self-confidence of the working class in France after the Revolution:

The harvesters in Lhermitte's painting were paid their daily allowance by the steward, standing upright, without humility.

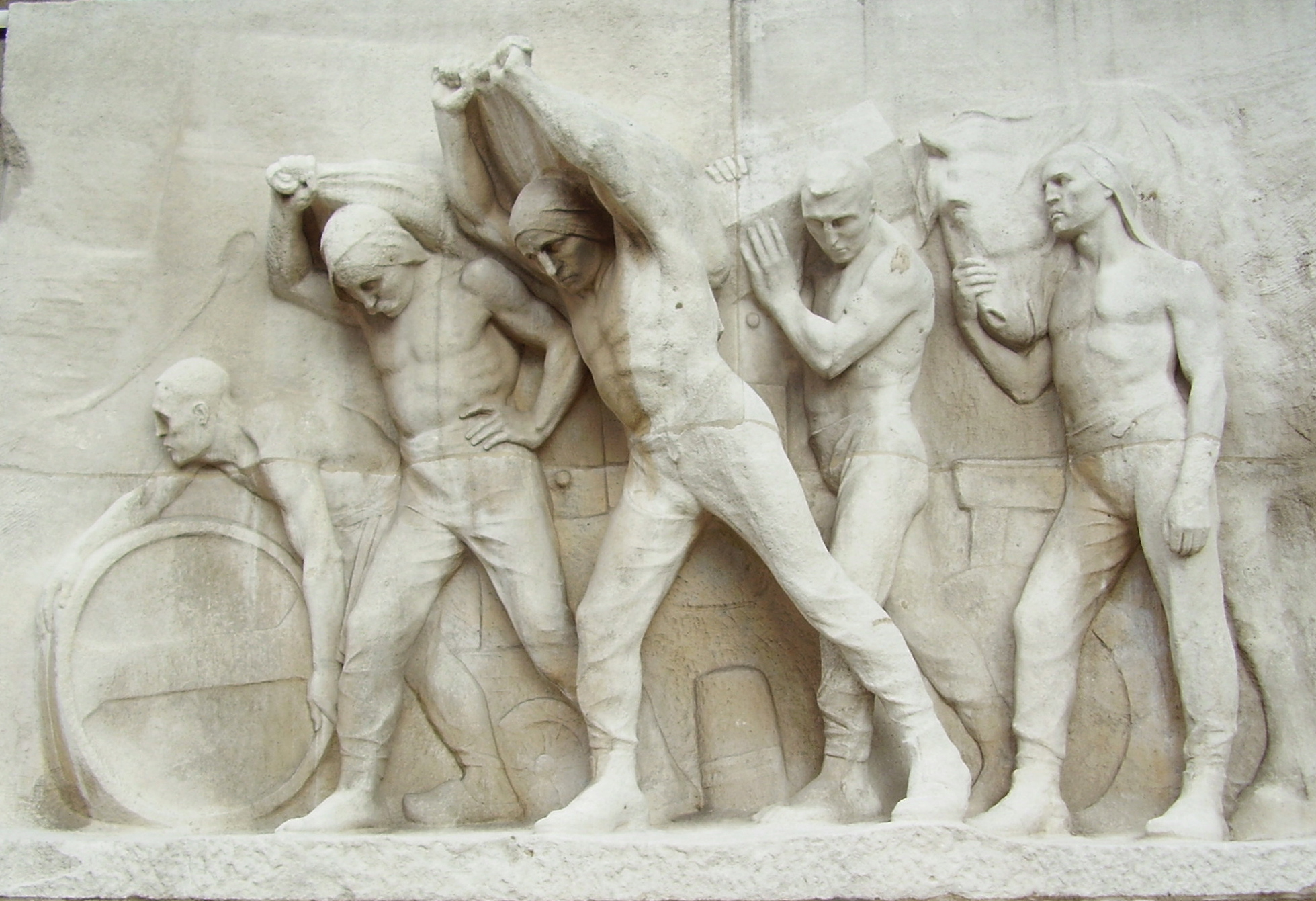

Constantin Meunier
Monument to Labour, Brussels - The Dockers, 1880

Quartier de Laeken, Brussels

Fine arts
Consisting of five sculptures and four reliefs (L'Industrie, La Mine, La Moisson et Les Dockers), this work of art remained unfinished until Meunier's death in 1905 and was completed in 1930 by the architect Mario Knauer.

- AedW I, p. 63
- Motif group: Work
Listed as an example of the representation of the self-confidence of the working class in France after the revolution:

Meunier's miners, dockers stood up in motionlessness, in deep earnestness, strength pervaded them, but they did not raise their hands.

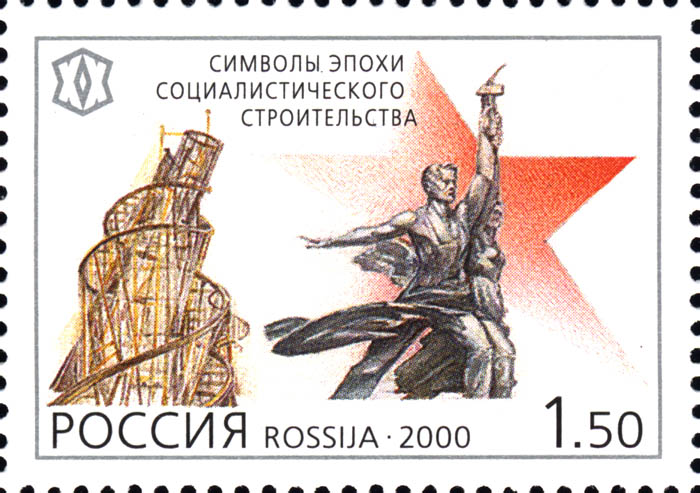

Vladimir Tatlin
Monument to the Third International (Tatlin Tower), 1917

Tatlin Tower and Worker and Kolkhoz Woman by Vera Mukhina 2000

Building
The design was intended as a symbol of the new Soviet society and envisaged a 400-metre-high tower as a machine-driven structure whose axis was to be able to align itself with the stars. The five-metre-high model caused a sensation at the World Exhibition of Decorative Arts in Paris in 1925, but was never realised. It is considered an architectural icon.

- AedW I, p. 66f.
In the protagonists' discussion of the significance of the Russian avant-garde for the revolution, this design is an example of the limits it encountered that is not explicitly mentioned:

It was a revolt of art, a revolt against the norms. The unrest in society, the latent violence, the urge for an upheaval was well expressed, but the workers and soldiers, in November Seventeen, had never seen or heard of these artistic parables.

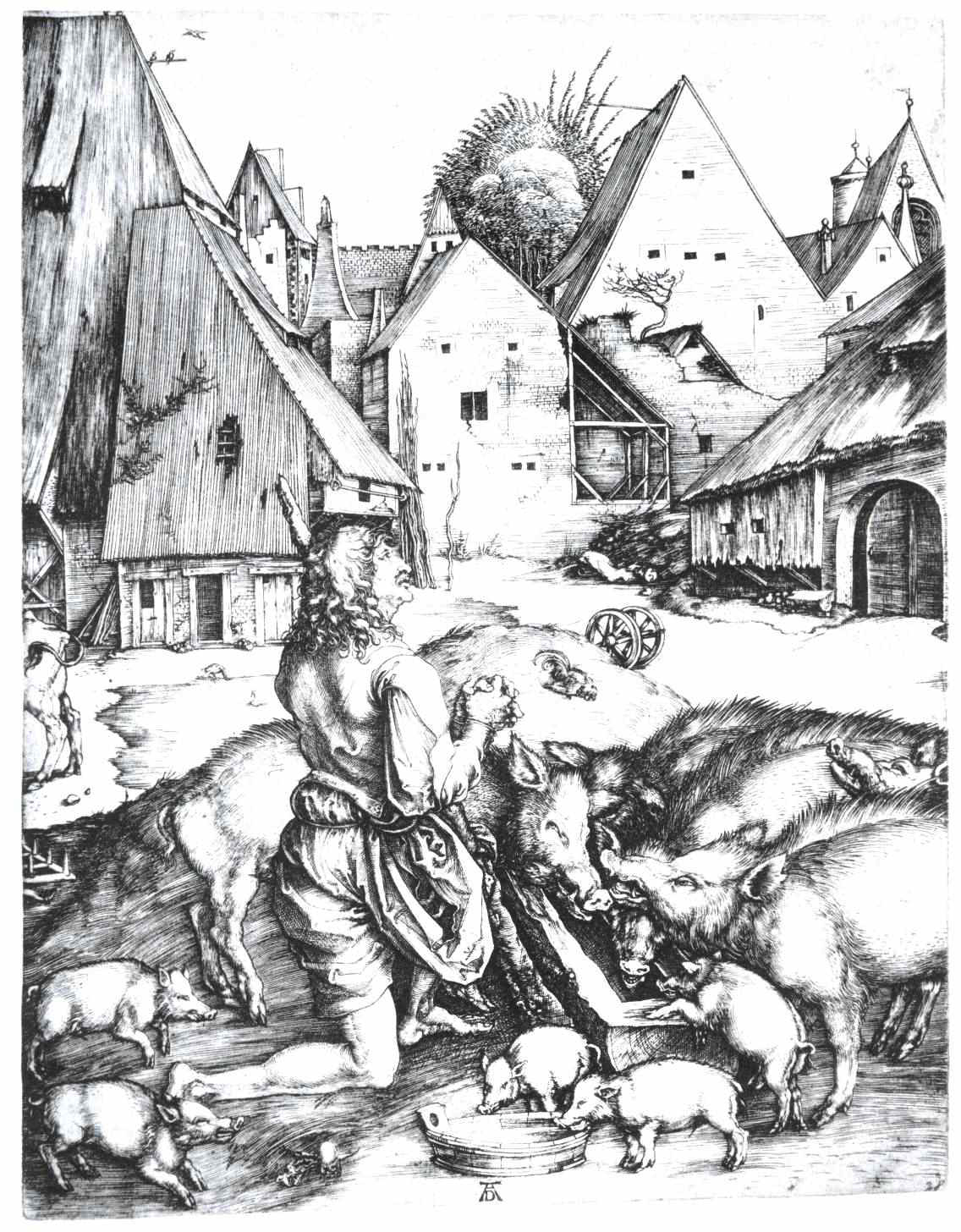

Albrecht Dürer
The Prodigal Son 1496

Copper engraving

Fine arts

- AedW I, p. 76
Comparison with Dürer's engraving of the Melencolia, which the latter created in 1514, it:

clearly indicated the separation between hierarchical art and that which was entirely of its own accord and had to make its choice entirely on its own.

In this context, The Prodigal Son is assigned to Christian iconography, while the Melencolia is assigned to Neoplatonic ideas. The image of the Melencolia is taken up again in the third volume of the novel. ff.

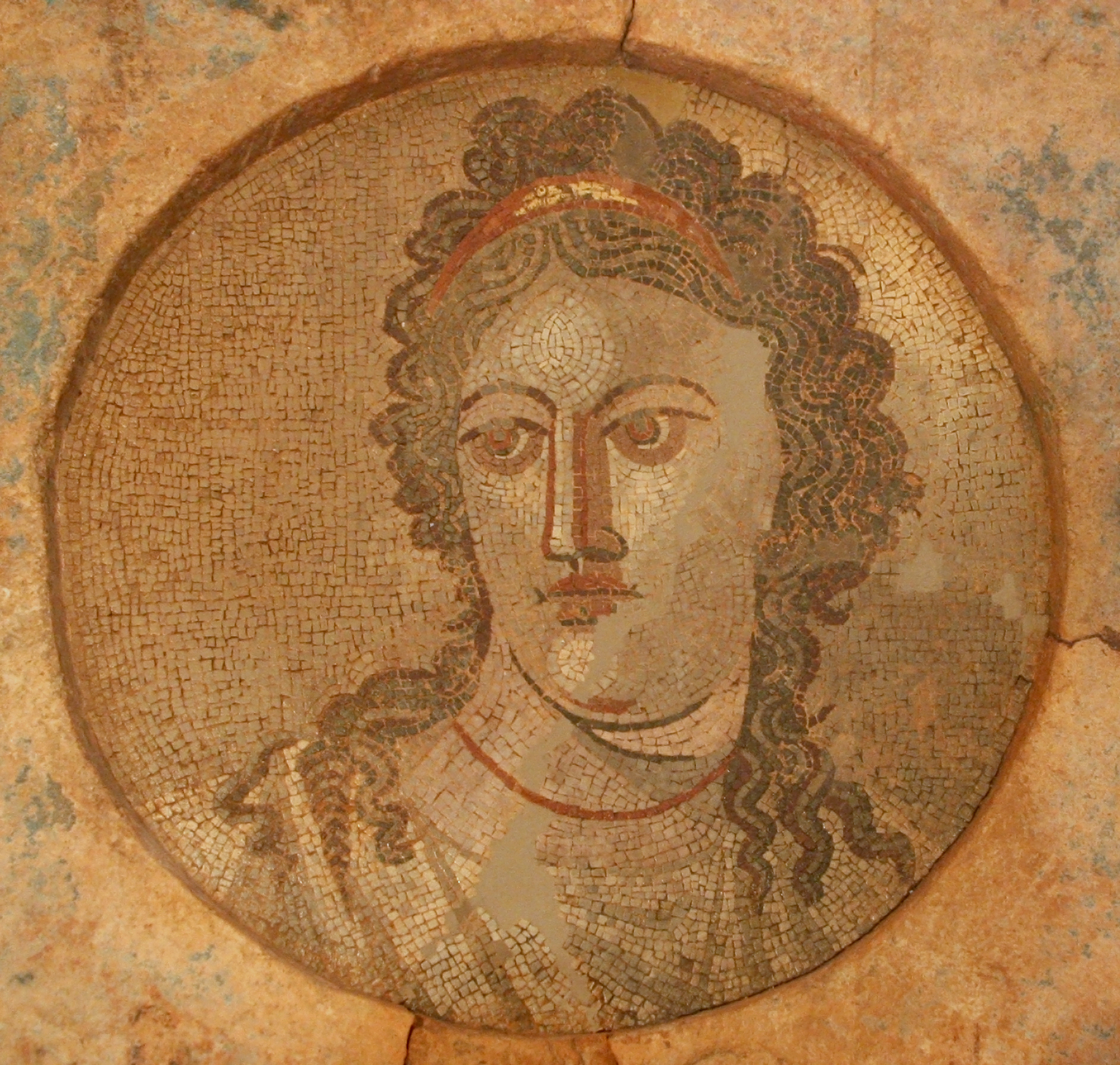

Greek mythology
Mnemosyne, 2nd Century AD

National Archaeological Museum of Tarragona

Mythology Mnemosyne is considered the goddess of memory and mother of the new muses.

- AedW I, p. 77;
- AedW III, p. 134
It is contrasted with the fascist iconoclasts and book burnings:

It protects what our own knowledge contains in the overall achievements. She whispers to us what our emotions desire. Whoever presumes to cultivate, to chastise, this stored good is attacking us and condemning our discernment.

Towards the end of the novel, the protective character of memory and its importance for art is taken up again:

Mneme, protected by the goddess Mnemosyne, guides us in artistic activities, and the more we have absorbed the phenomena of the world, to the richer combinations we could bring them, to the diversity, from which the state of our culture can be read

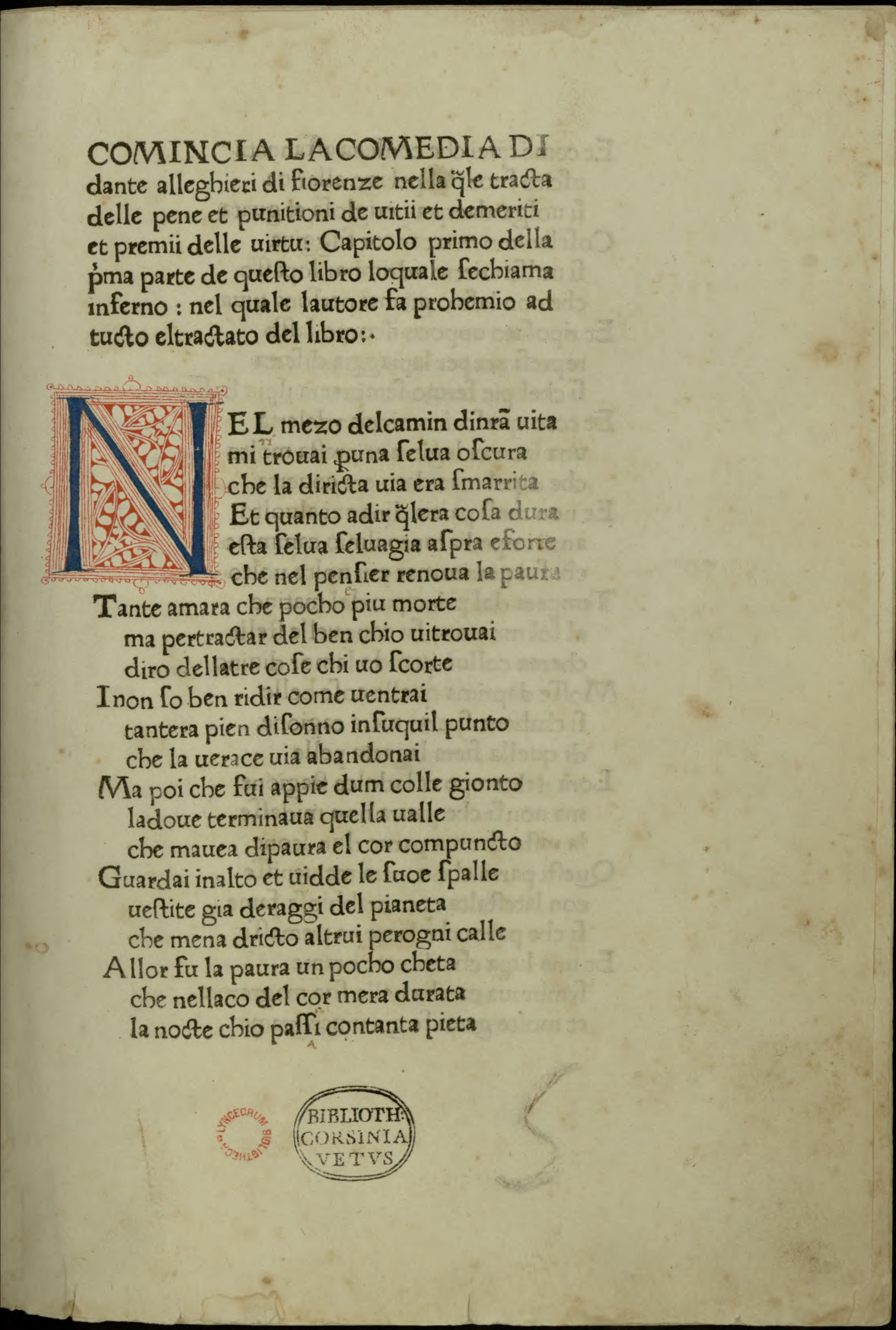

Dante Alighieri
Divine Comedy, 1307-1321

Verse narrative

Literature
The Divine Comedy is considered one of the major works of world literature. It is about the journey of a first-person narrator through the three realms of the dead: hell, purgatory to paradise.

- AedW I, p. 79 ff.
The Divine Comedy occupies a central position, as it is not only discussed in detail, but Peter Weiss' novel itself is reminiscent in parts of a wandering through worlds. The protagonists reflect on the insights and worlds that open up to them with Dante and thus on the importance of education for the working class:

It was not enough to draw attention to the fact that the libraries were open, first you had to overcome the generational obsession that the book was not there for you.

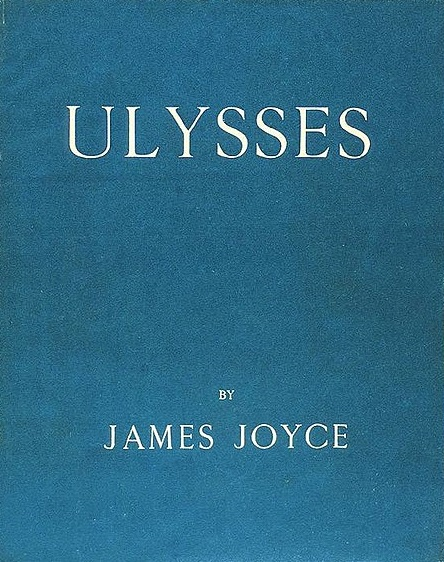

James Joyce
Ulysses 1914-1921

novel

Literature
Considered one of the most important works of Irish literature, this novel describes in 18 episodes 16 June 1904, a day in the life of Leopold Bloom, an advertising canvasser. In the style of Homer's Odysseus in the Odyssey, the protagonist wanders through Dublin.

- AedW I, p. 79
Ulysses is classified by the protagonists as just as disturbing, rebellious, formally and thematically alien as Dante's Divina Commedia and thus placed in relation to it.

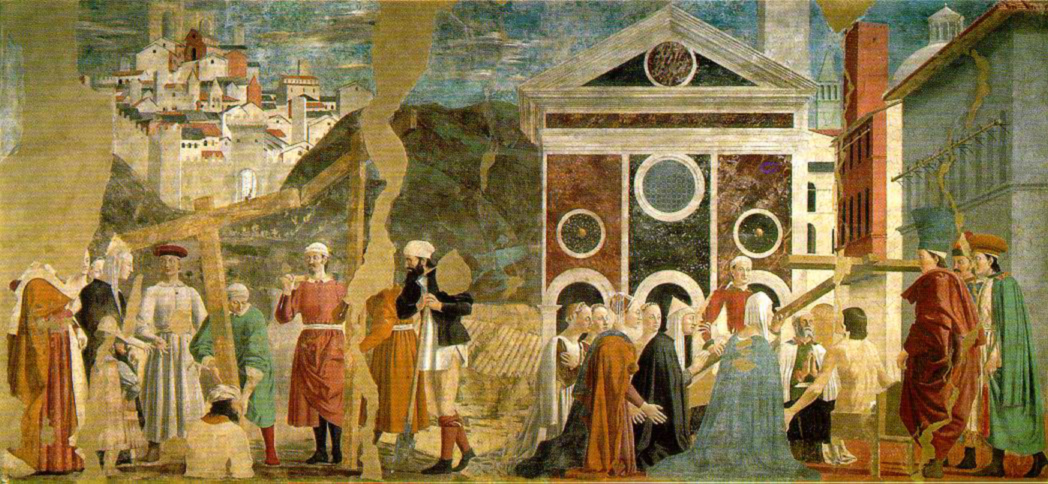

Piero della Francesca
Finding and testing the true cross from the cycle

The History of the True Cross, c. 1466
Basilica of San Francesco, Arezzo

Visual arts
The ten-part cycle depicts the story of Christ's cross according to the Golden Legend by Jacobus de Voragine. Three of the ten scenes are singled out. This one depicts the presumed excavation of the crosses of Golgotha in 324, which was relocated to Arezzo. The cross of Christ can be identified by the fact that it brings a dead man back to life.

- AedW I, p. 84
The protagonists reflect on the segregation of classes that is inherent in the paintings and question what lessons they themselves, as seekers, can learn from the exclusive, sophisticated art of the rulers and the privileged. In this one, it is the "geometrically fancy walls" of the city view of Arezzo, "the green-blue of the sky taken up by the strangely unspoiled ground, all this was of a vision that eschewed all emotion."[19]

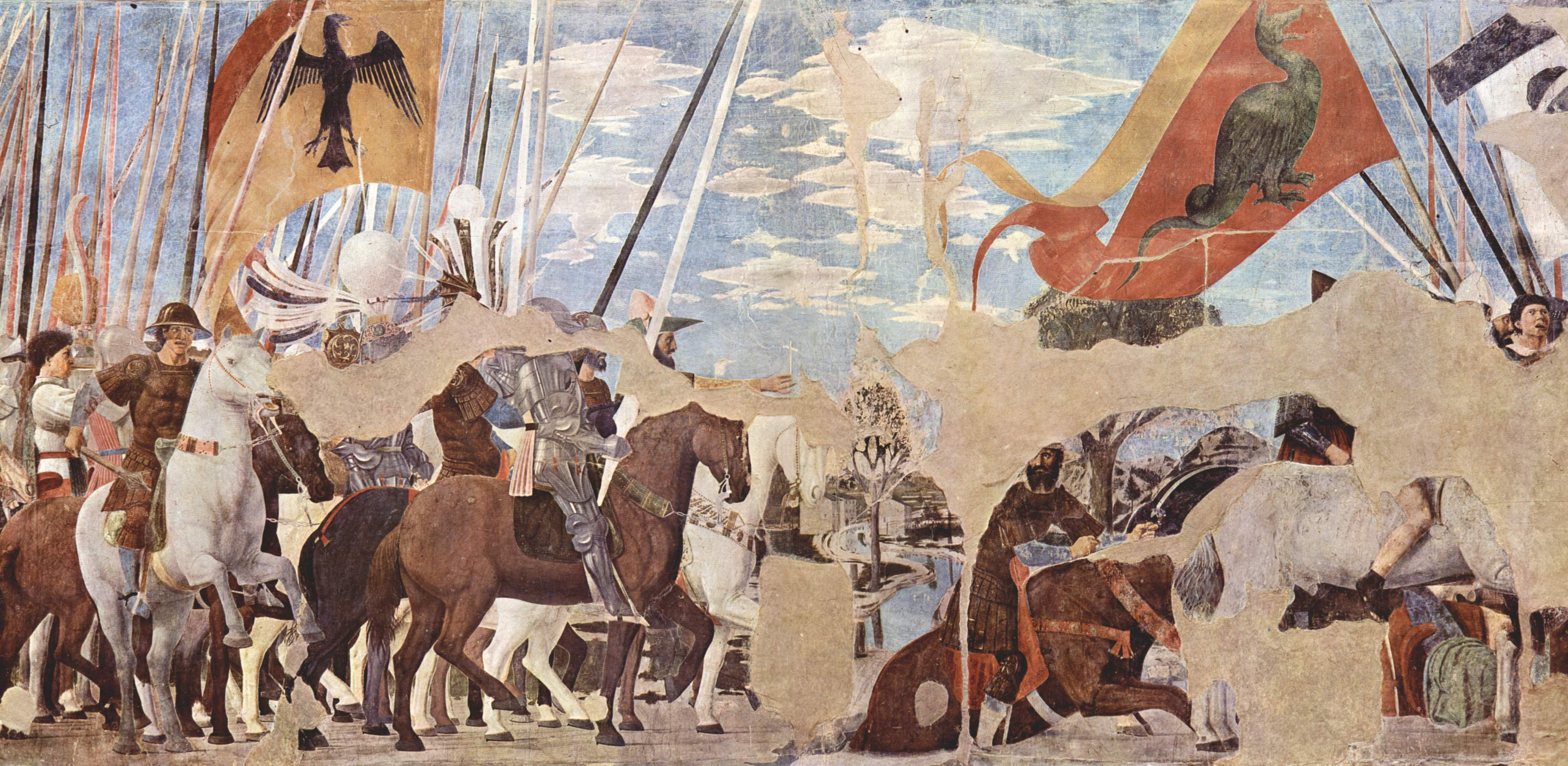

Piero della Francesca
The Victory of Constantine over Maxentius from the cycle

The Legend of the True Cross, c. 1466
Basilica of San Francesco, Arezzo

Visual arts
The ten-part cycle depicts the story of the Cross of Christ according to the Golden Legend by Jacobus de Voragine. Three of the ten scenes are singled out. This one depicts the Battle of Milvian Bridge in 312, in which the Roman Emperor Constantine the Great defeats his rival Maxentius. It is regarded as the introduction of the Constantinian shift, with which Christianity began to rise.

- AedW I, p. 84
- Motif group: War
The protagonists reflect on the class segregation that is inherent in the paintings and question what teaching material the exclusive, sophisticated art of the ruling and privileged can offer for themselves as seekers. In this context, it is especially the two battle paintings of the cycle and the constructed depiction of the soldiers that receive their attention.

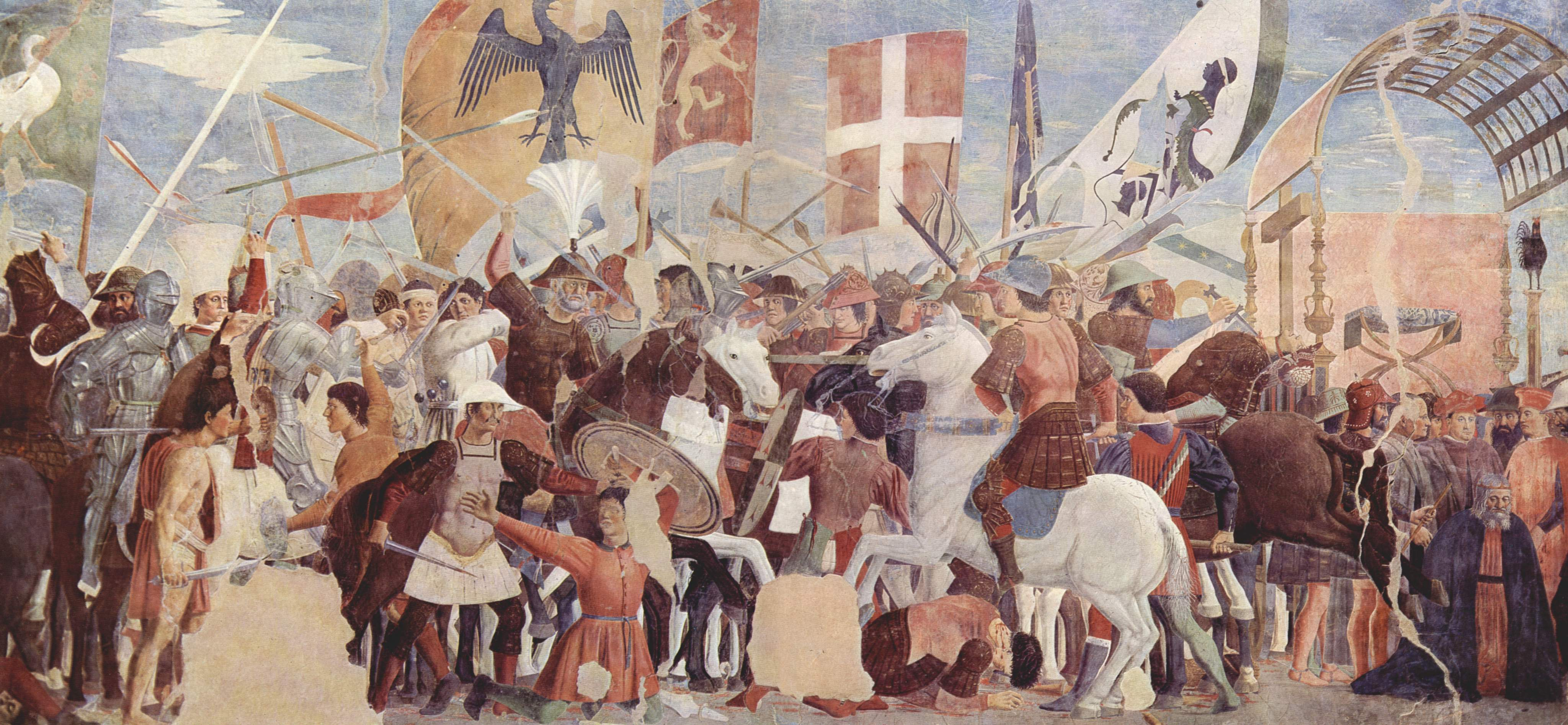

Piero della Francesca
The Battle between Heraclius and Chosroes from the cycle

The Legend of the True Cross, c. 1466
Basilica of San Francesco, Arezzo

Visual arts The ten-part cycle depicts the story of the Cross of Christ according to the Golden Legend by Jacobus de Voragine. Three of the ten scenes are singled out. This one depicts a battle for the Christian cross in the year 627, in which the Persian king Chosrau II is defeated by the Eastern Roman emperor Heraclius.

- AedW I, p. 85
- Motif group: War
The protagonists reflect on the class segregation that is inherent in the paintings and question what teaching material the exclusive, sophisticated art of the ruling and privileged can offer for themselves as seekers. In this context, it is especially the two battle paintings of the cycle and the constructed depiction of the soldiers that receive their attention

Hieronymus Bosch
The Haywain Triptych, c. 1490

Museo del Prado

Fine arts

- AedW I, p. 86
Example of a list in which Peter Weiss explains how the faces of the servants and maids stood out in the works that were nevertheless dedicated to the favoured:

"In Mantegna and Masaccio, Grien, Grünewald and Dürer, in Bosch, Brueghel and Goya, the working people already came to the fore".

Bosch's haywain is not explicitly mentioned, the background arises from the epitaph on Hodann's life, the monument that Peter Weiss wanted to set to the doctor and sex educator Max Hodann in the novel, but which was not included in the published version.

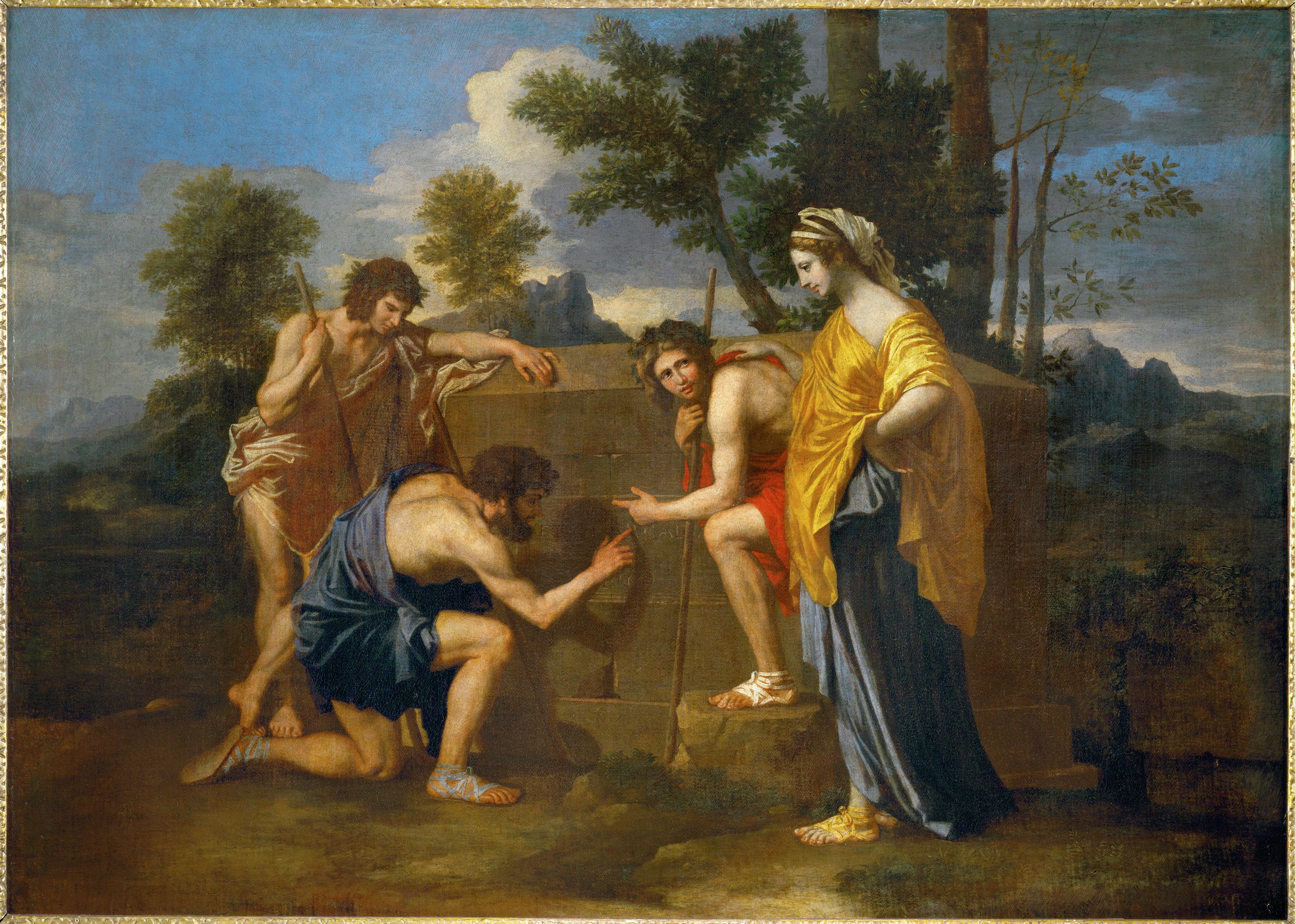

Nicolas Poussin
Et in arcadia ego, 1637-1638

Louvre, Paris

Visual arts
The motif, taken up many times in art, in which the shepherds of Arcadia are confronted with death, is translated by the phrase Also I was in Arcadia and amounts to the further phrase Memento mori.

- AedW I, p. 86
- AedW II, p. 31
Example of an enumeration in which Peter Weiss explains how the faces of the servants and maids stood out in works that were nevertheless dedicated to the favoured:

"The shepherds and fishermen, who had accepted their decorative functions, suddenly lost, in pictures by Poussin, their simplicity and gentleness (...)."

In a later place, Peter Weiss develops the influence of Géricaults from the interpretation that the Golden Age already contains the moment of terror, the discovery of the tomb and the resigned experience of natural law. Later, Peter Weiss, from the interpretation that the Golden Age already contains the moment of terror of the discovery of the tomb and the resigned experience of the law of nature, develops the influence on Théodore Géricault's painting Raft of the Medusa.

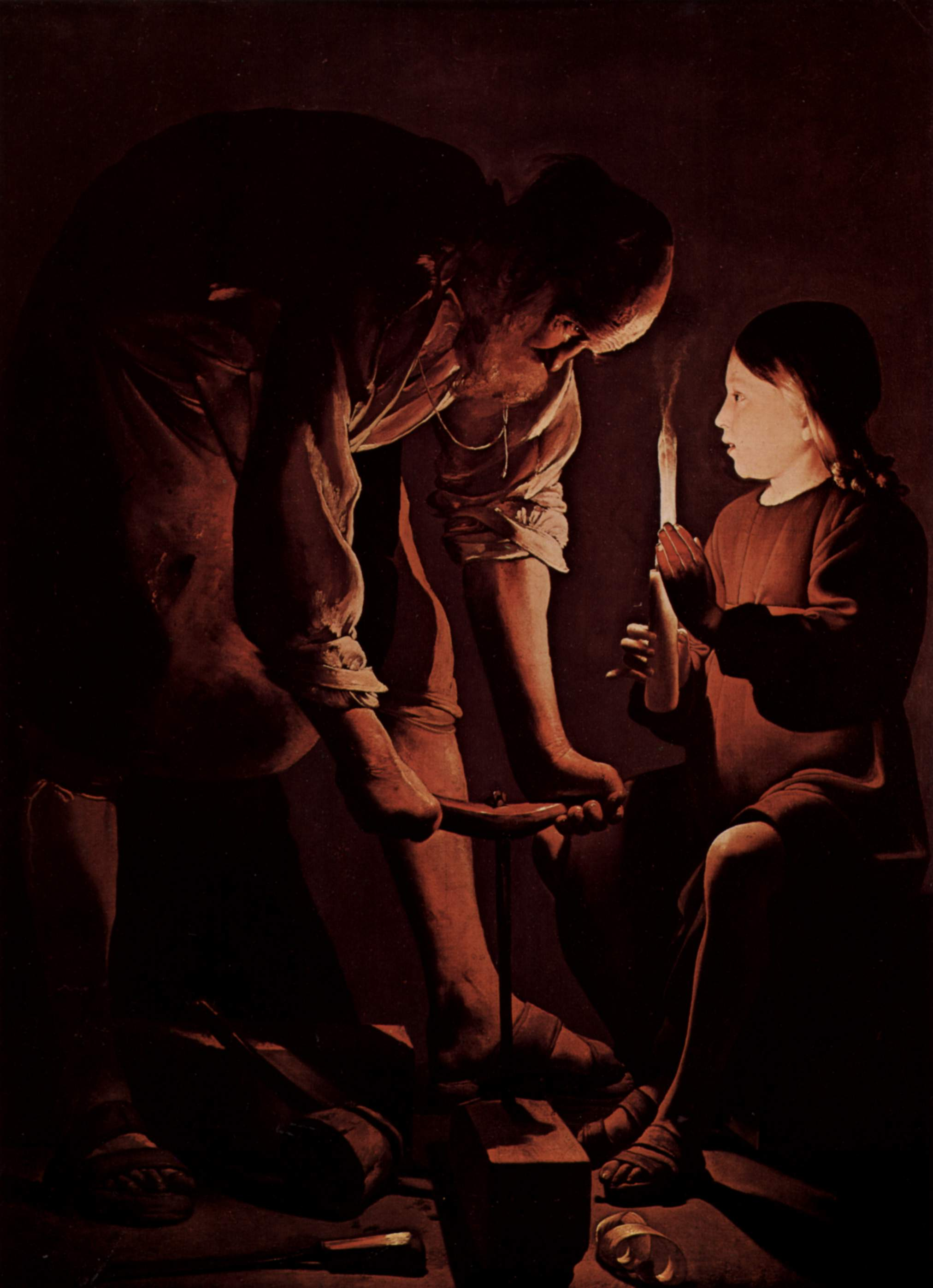

Georges de La Tour
Saint Joseph the carpenter, c. 1640

Louvre, Paris

Fine arts

- AedW I, p. 86
- Motif group: Work
Example of a list in which Peter Weiss explains how the faces of the servants and maids stood out in the works that were nevertheless dedicated to the favoured:

"A blacksmith, a carpenter became so outstanding with their work at La Tour that they took up the picture space alone (...)".

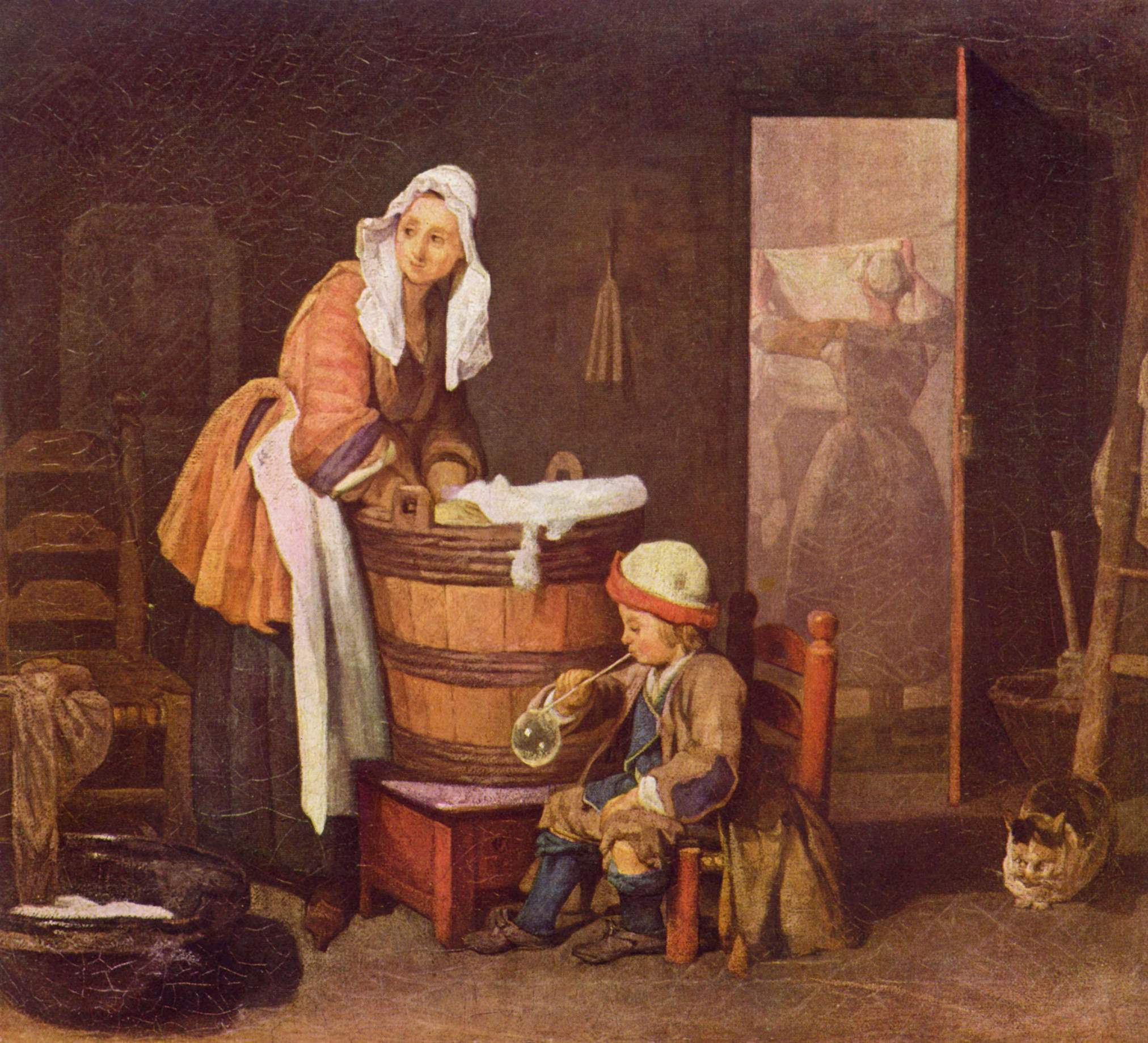

Jean Siméon Chardin
The Laundress, 1733

St. Petersburg, Hermitage Museum

Fine arts

- AedW I, p. 86
- Motif group: Work
Example of a list in which Peter Weiss explains how the faces of the servants and maids stood out in the works that were, after all, dedicated to the favoured:

"Vermeer, Chardin did not reserve maturity, beauty for the superiors, but gave them to the seamstress, the washerwoman, the maid".

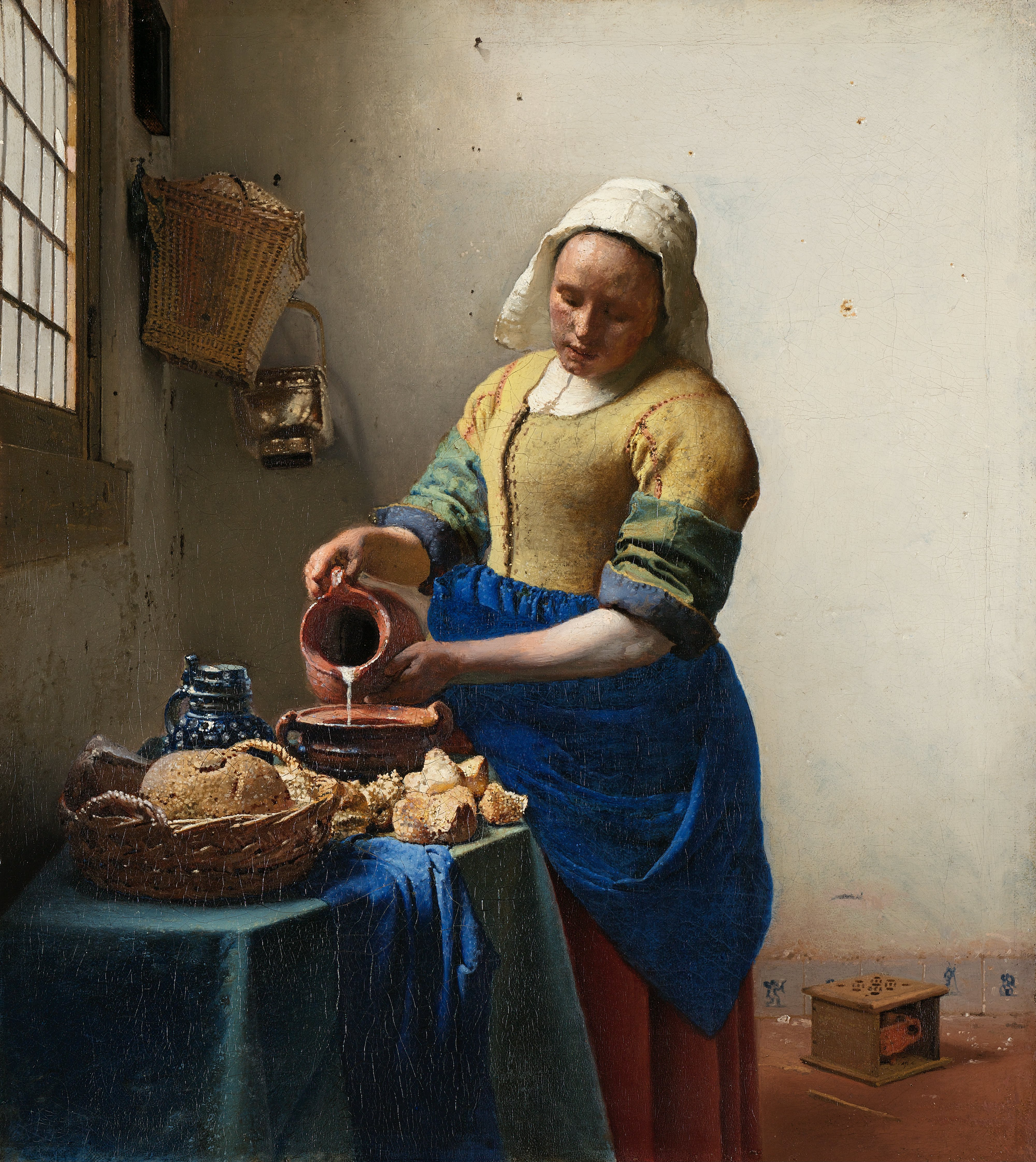

Jan Vermeer
The Milkmaid (Vermeer), c. 1660

Amsterdam, Rijksmuseum

Visual arts

- AedW I, p. 86
- Motif group: Work
Example of a list in which Peter Weiss explains how the faces of the servants and maids stood out in the works that were, after all, dedicated to the favoured:

"Vermeer, Chardin did not reserve maturity, beauty for the superiors, but gave them to the seamstress, the washerwoman, the maid".

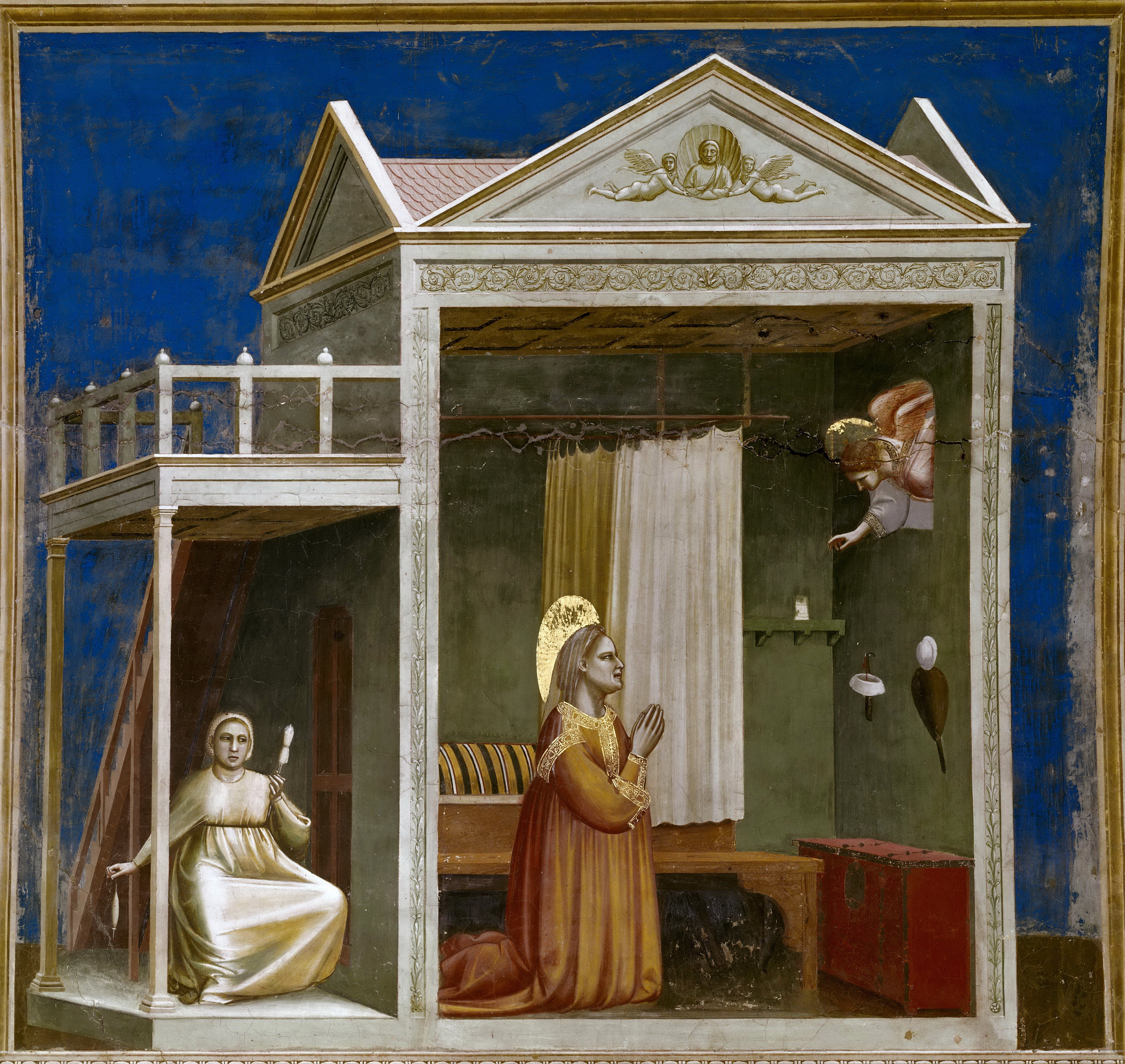

Giotto di Bondone
Annunciation to Saint Anne 1304-1306

Cycle of the Life of Joachim
Padua, Scrovegni Chapel

Fine arts

- AedW I, p. 88 f.
An allegory in the first-person narrator's dream, in which he matches the images of his barren flat with Bondone's cycle and a surreal scene emerges. In the memories of his parents, the father appears as Joachim and the mother as Anna:

"My mother knelt, in a long brown petticoat, like Anna, to whom something was announced through the wall, on the floor, in front of the wooden frame that was my bed.

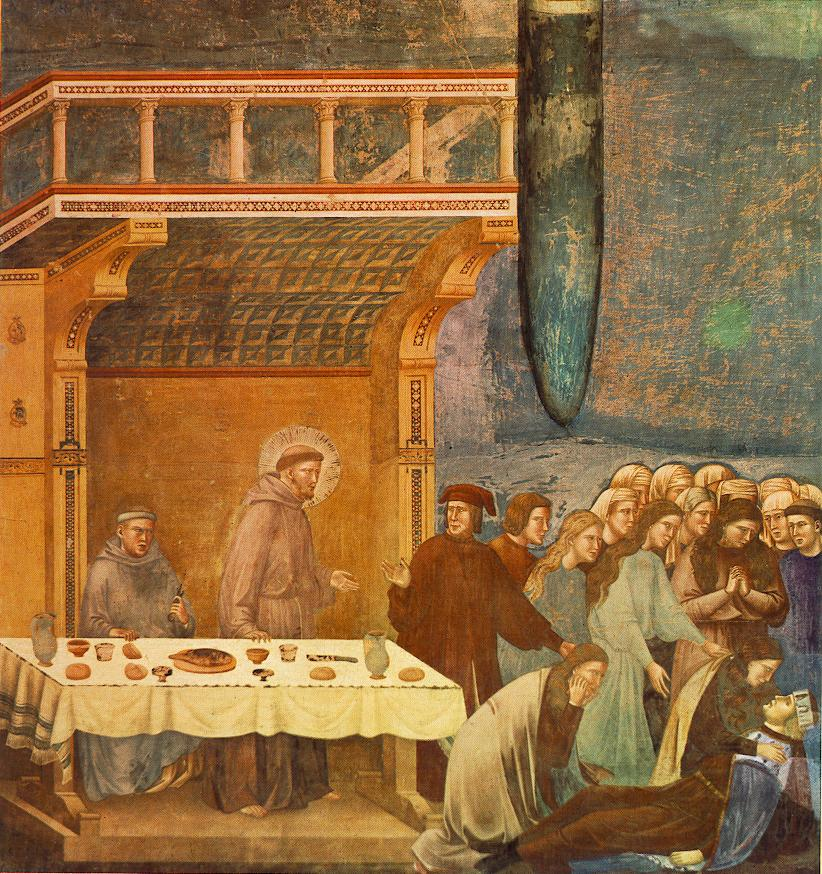

Giotto di Bondone
Death of the Knight of Celano, 1295

Assisi, Upper Basilica of San Francesco d'Assisi

Visual arts

- AedW I, S. 88 f.
Symbolism in the dream of the first-person narrator, in which various frescoes flow into the images of the first-person narrator, here the sparse empty flat transitions to a projection of the laid table.

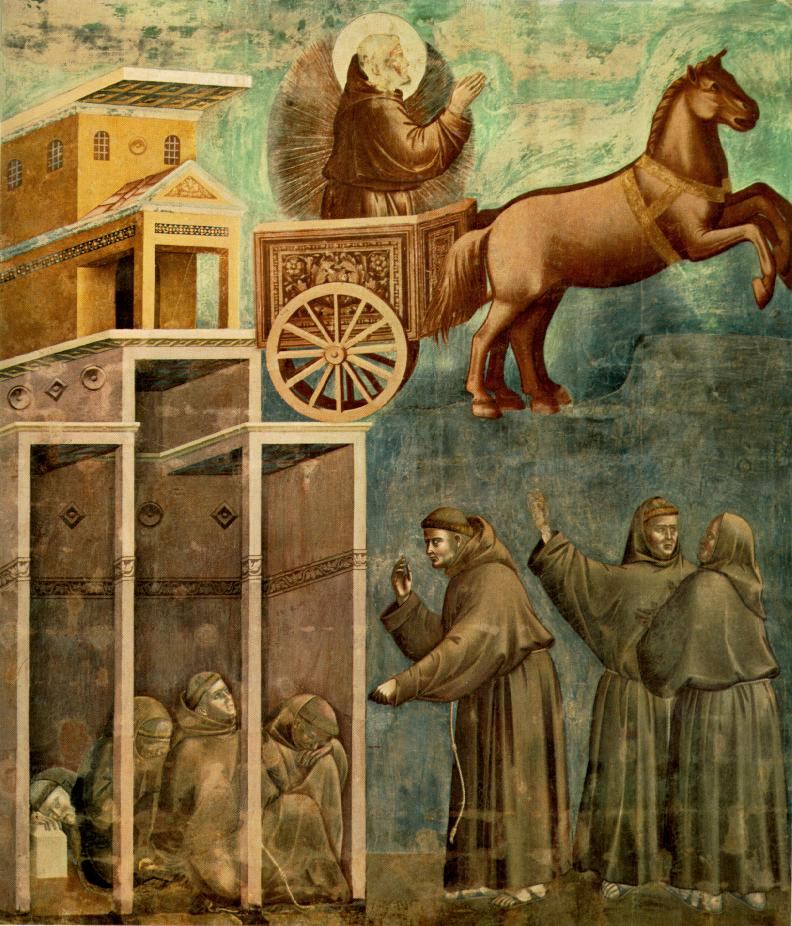

Giotto di Bondone
Legend of St Francis, Vision of the Flaming Chariot, 1297-1300

Assisi, Basilica of San Francesco d'Assisi

Fine arts

- AedW I, pp. 89, 92
Symbol in the first-person narrator's dream with a surreal resurrection image of the father from the kitchen floor and a vision of flight:

"From the first crack I already knew that someone was buried there, and when the plank that had broken loose opened sideways, I also immediately recognised my father's hand, dusty all over, with the broad joint, the strong knuckles, his arm emerging from the mortar, his face still in the tow stuffed between the planks, I wanted to help him, but I was hanging so far out of the window that the next movement would throw me out.

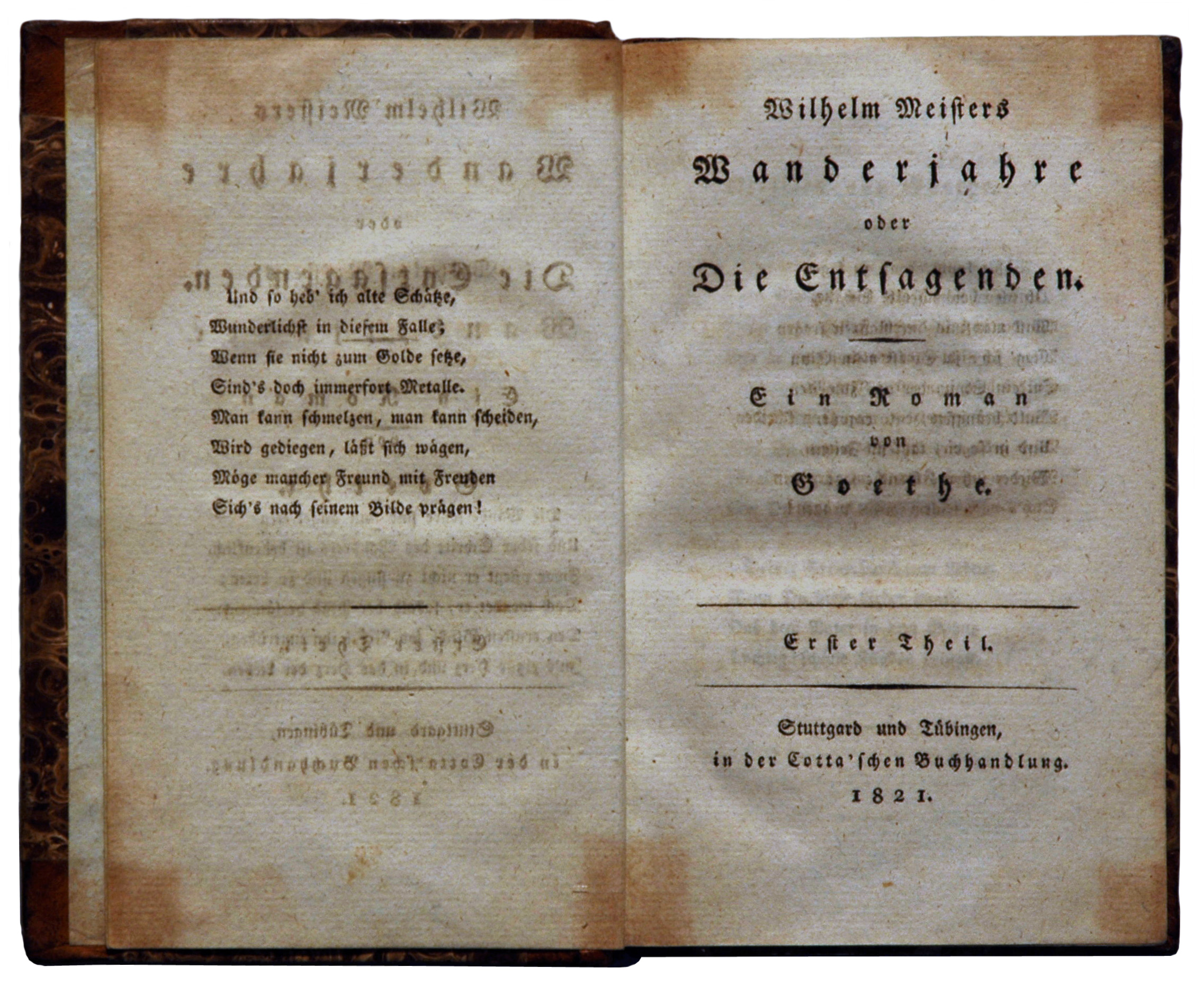

Johann Wolfgang von Goethe
Wilhelm Meister's Journeyman Years, 1821–29

novel

Literature

- AedW I, p. 134
Example of the range of the social novel in which the educated bourgeoisie is represented:

"Because from Wilhelm Meister onwards to the Buddenbrooks, the world that set the tone in literature was seen through the eyes of those who owned it, the household could be encompassed with such attention to detail and the personality in the richness of all stages of development".

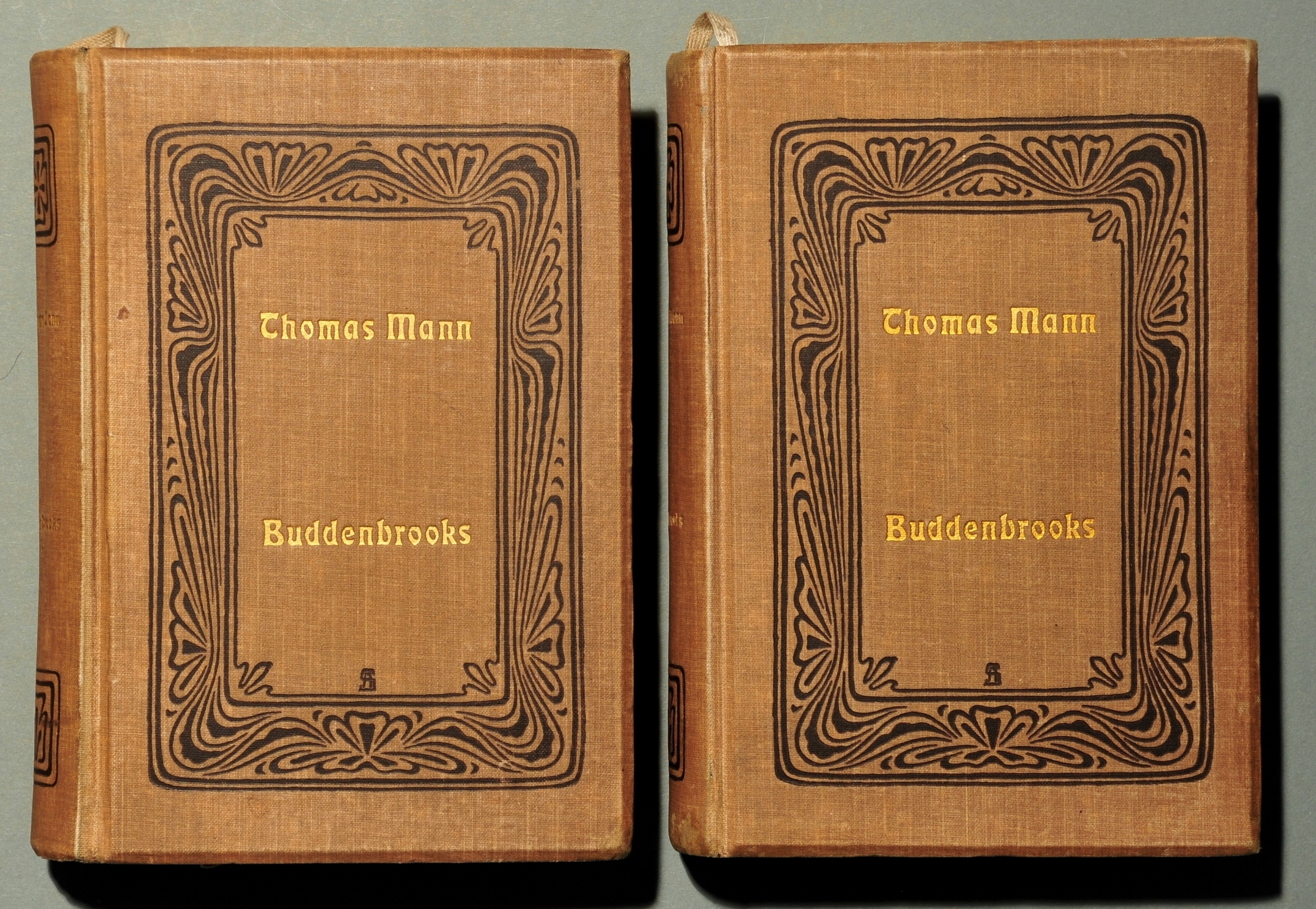

Thomas Mann
Buddenbrooks, 1901

Literature

- AedW I, S. 134
::"Because from Wilhelm Meister onwards to the Buddenbrooks, the world that set the tone in literature was seen through the eyes of those who owned it, the household could be encompassed with such attention to detail and the personality in the richness of all stages of development".

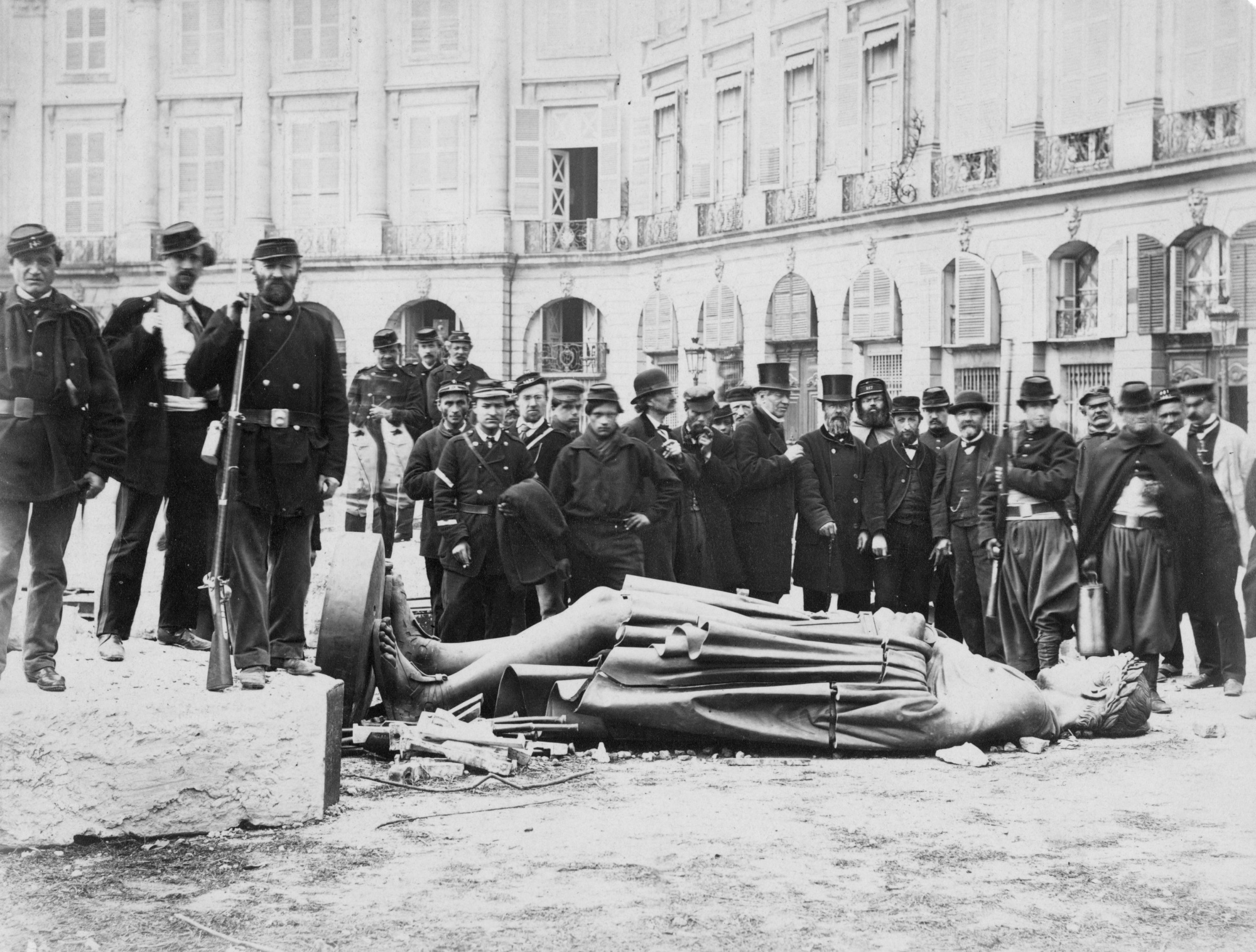

Pierre-Nolasque Bergeret
Colonne Vendôme, 1806-1810

Victory Column Place Vendôme, Paris

Fine Arts
The 44-metre-high column with a statue of Napoleon I was toppled during the Paris Commune uprising on 16 May 1871.

- AedW I, p. 152f.
- Motif group: Resistance / Uprising
"In the rubble, in a cloud of dust, lay the emperor, toga and laurel wreath. His betrayal of the revolution had been atoned for."

John Heartfield
The meaning of the Hitler salute, Motto: Millions stand behind me, 1932

Rotogravure

Visual arts

- AedW I, p. 158
Example of the cultural contributions in the Arbeiter Illustrierte (AIZ) magazine.

Background
Urgent Call for Unity,1932

Appeal

With the Urgent Appeal in June 1932, well-known personalities called for tactical cooperation between the SPD and the KPD against the strengthening NSDAP.

- AedW I, p. 158 f.
Enumeration of artists who supported the urgent appeal and inclusion of later appeals initiated by Willi Münzenberg, editor of the AIZ.

Background
Lutetia Circle,1935-1937

Association

The Lutetia Circle was a committee of artists and politicians of various currents, mainly from the SPD and KPD groups, who met for several conferences at the Hôtel Lutetia in Paris between 1935 and 1937 in order to find an anti-fascist consensus against the Nazi regime.

- AedW I, p. 159, p. 167 f.
Weiss describes a list of artists who participated in the Lutetia Circle and allusion to Heinrich Heine's essay Lutetia.

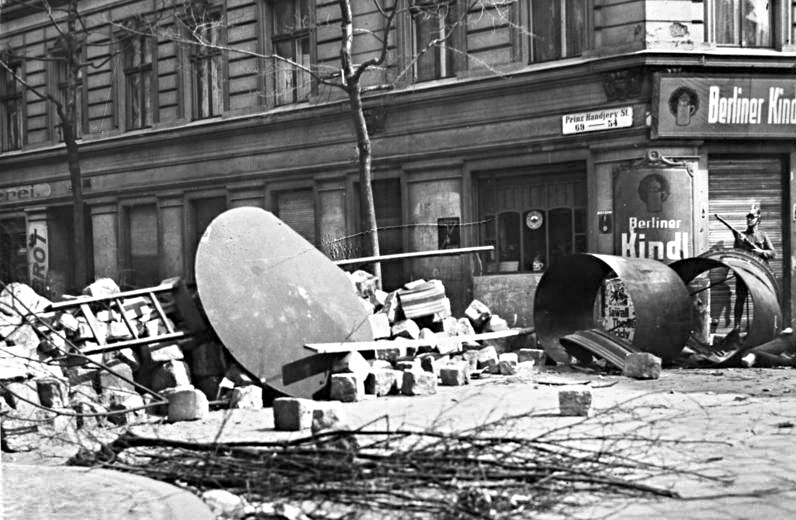

Klaus Neukrantz
Barrikaden am Wedding,1931

Novel of a street from the Berlin May Days
Literature

Novel about the May riots of 1 to 3 May 1929 in Berlin

- AedW I, p. 161, 182
In Peter Weiss' book, Neukrantz's book "Barrikaden am Wedding" is extensively acknowledged. The first-person narrator juxtaposes it with Franz Kafka's novel, The Castle and reflects extensively on the potential value of both works for the workers' movement. The latter is a purposeful depiction of a historical event, whereas Kafka thinks the subject through in a labyrinthine way. The books "clearly showed how the diversities were dependent on each other, how they complemented each other and could not get along without each other.

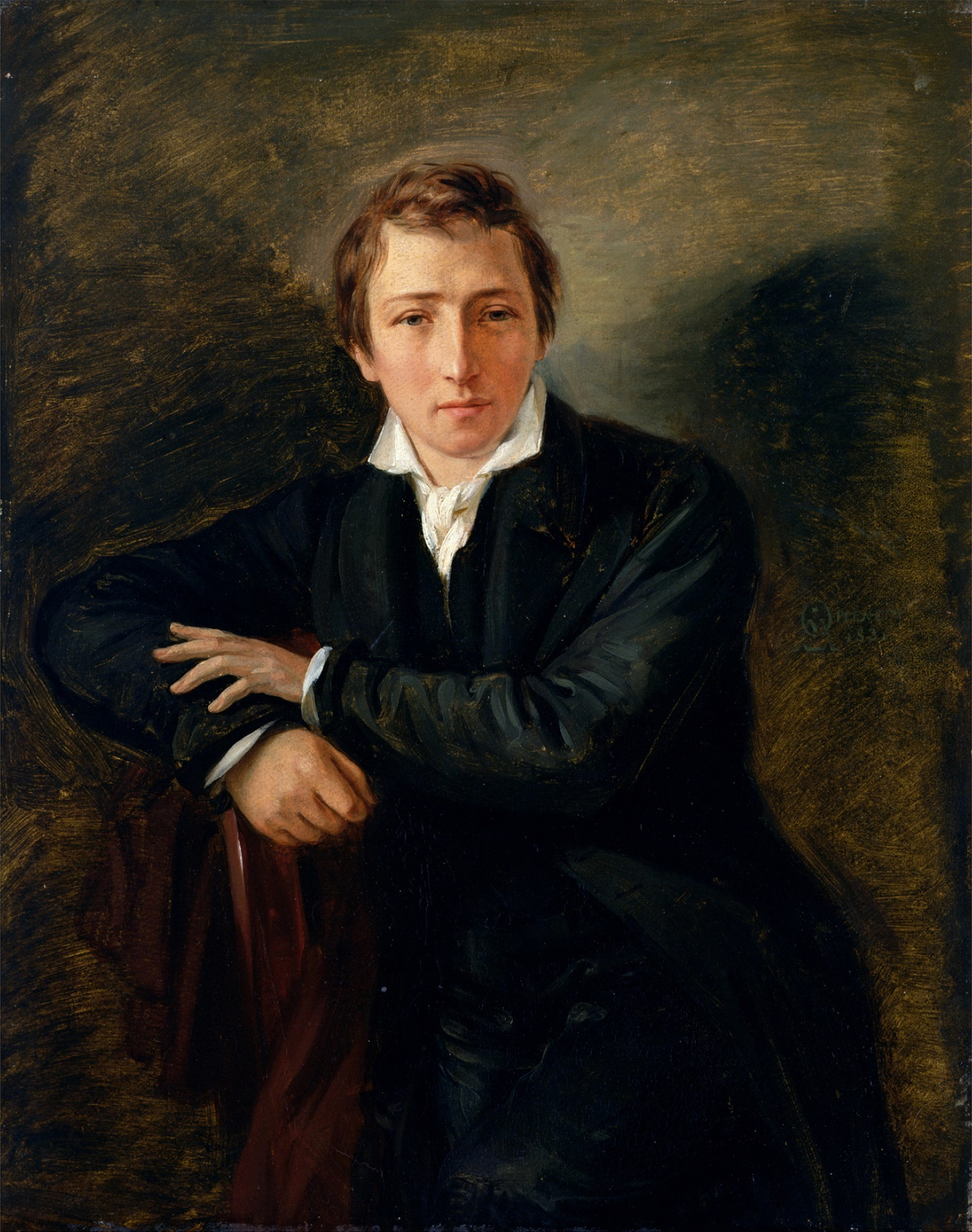

Heinrich Heine
Lutetia, 1854

Essay on Politics, Art and Popular Life
Literature
In this essay, Heine describes his ambivalent relationship to Marxist philosophy, whose concerns he acknowledges and yet through which he fears the destruction of his cultural values.

- AedW I, p. 164
Excerpt from Heine's work as an ironic allusion to the participants of the Lutetia Circle:

"Now once assembled under the best of intentions, they would have heard, had they been clairaudient, what Heine had to say to them, (...) referring to the epoch in which the sinister iconoclasts, the Communists, would come to rule, break all the marble statues of beauty, smash all the tinsel of art, cut down the poet's laurel groves and plant potatoes there, and turn his poetry books into bags to keep coffee in them and shove tobacco. "

George Grosz
Café, 1919

Fine arts

- AedW I, p. 169f.
Example of art that could express the feelings of the first-person narrator, the hatred of greed and selfishness, the murderous loathing of exploitation, subjugation and torture:

"Only rarely did we find this sentiment expressed in art, in literature; it appeared in rudimentary form in the paintings of Grosz and Dix, Heartfield's collages came closest to it, and then it confronted us in a clearly defined way in Lenin's April Theses."

Otto Dix
Triumph of Death, 1934

Staatsgalerie Stuttgart

Fine Art

- AedW I, p. 170
- Motif group: Images of horror
Example of art that could express the feelings of the first-person narrator.

John Heartfield
War and corpses - The last hope of the rich, 1932

Photomontage

Visual arts

- AedW I, p. 170
- Motif group: War
Example of art that could express the feelings of the first-person narrator.

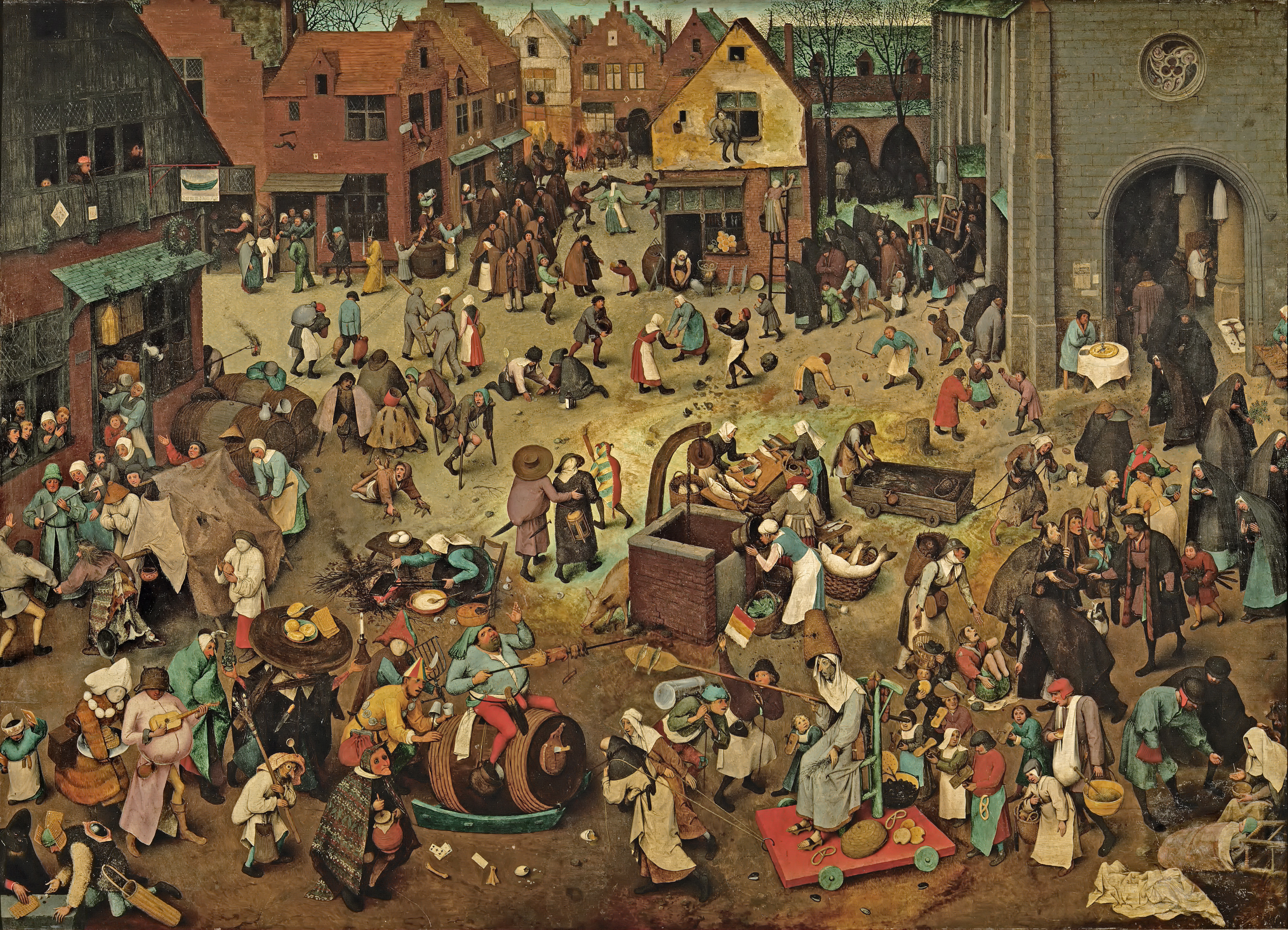

Pieter Bruegel the Elder
The Fight Between Carnival and Lent, 1559

Kunsthistorisches Museum

Fine arts

- AedW I, p. 172
Description of the painting in many details, content as a poor dream of gluttony with the conclusion:

"There was not a trace of pleasure and conviviality in the paintings depicting folk life".

Peter Weiss draws an arc from a total of seven paintings by Pieter Brueghel to Franz Kafka's novel The Castle and introduces this comparison with the statement:

"Brueghel and Kafka had painted world landscapes, thin, transparent, yet in earth tones, their pictures were simultaneously luminous and dark, they seemed massive, heavy as a whole, glowing, overly clear in their details".

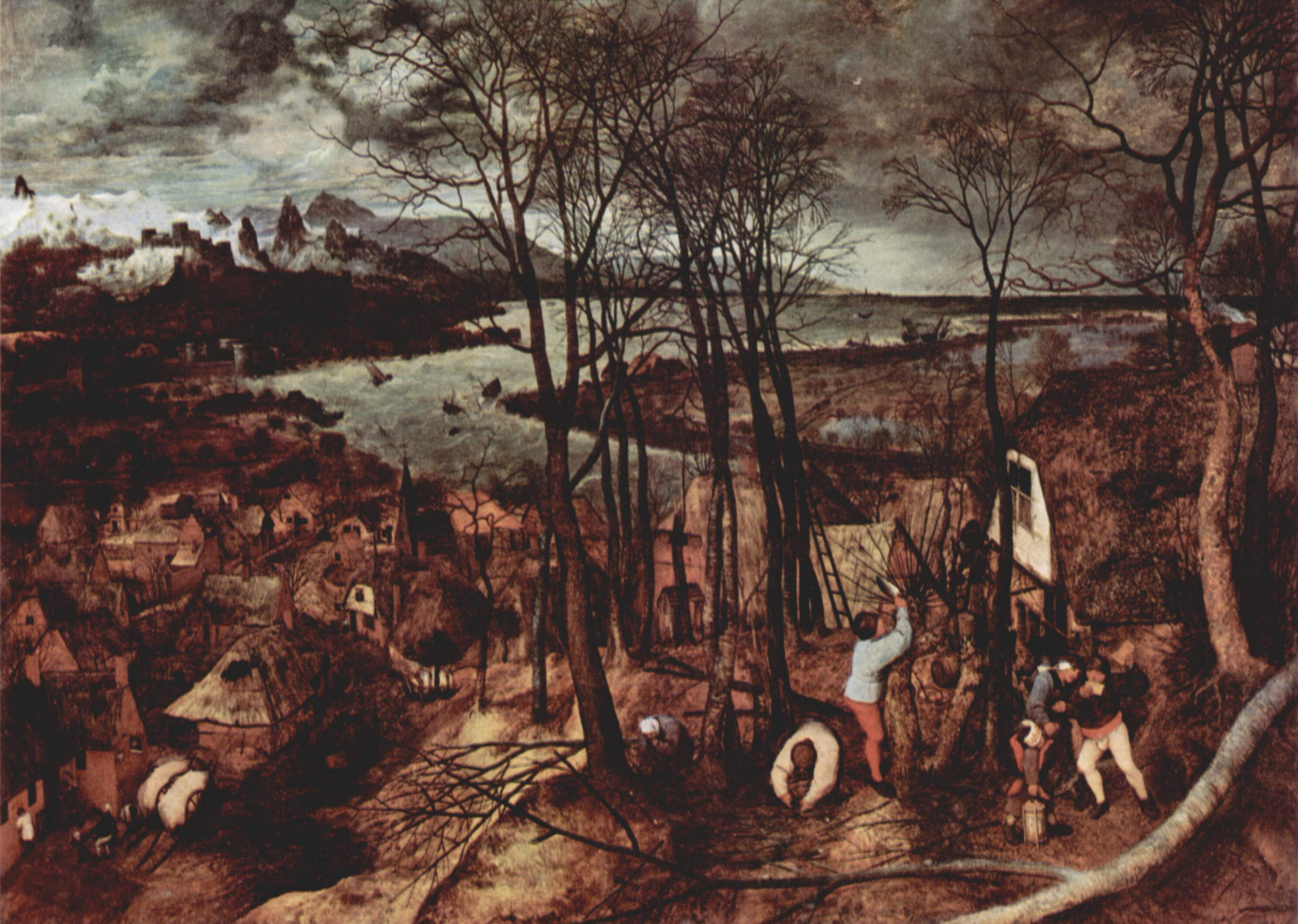

Pieter Bruegel the Elder
The Gloomy Day, 1565

Kunsthistorisches Museum

Fine Art

- AedW I, p. 174
Listed as an example of Brueghel's depictions of farm workers, artisans, peasants and others, all of whom are joyless and drawn with "almost stupid dullness" in all their activities

"whether, under stormy skies, they were cutting crops from the willow trees (...)".

Pieter Bruegel the Elder
The Tower of Babel 1563

Kunsthistorisches Museum

Fine Art

- AedW I, S. 174
Listed as an example of Brueghel's depictions of farm workers, craftsmen, peasants,

"(...) whether they, built the monstrous enclosure of the Tower of Babylon around the rocky peaks."

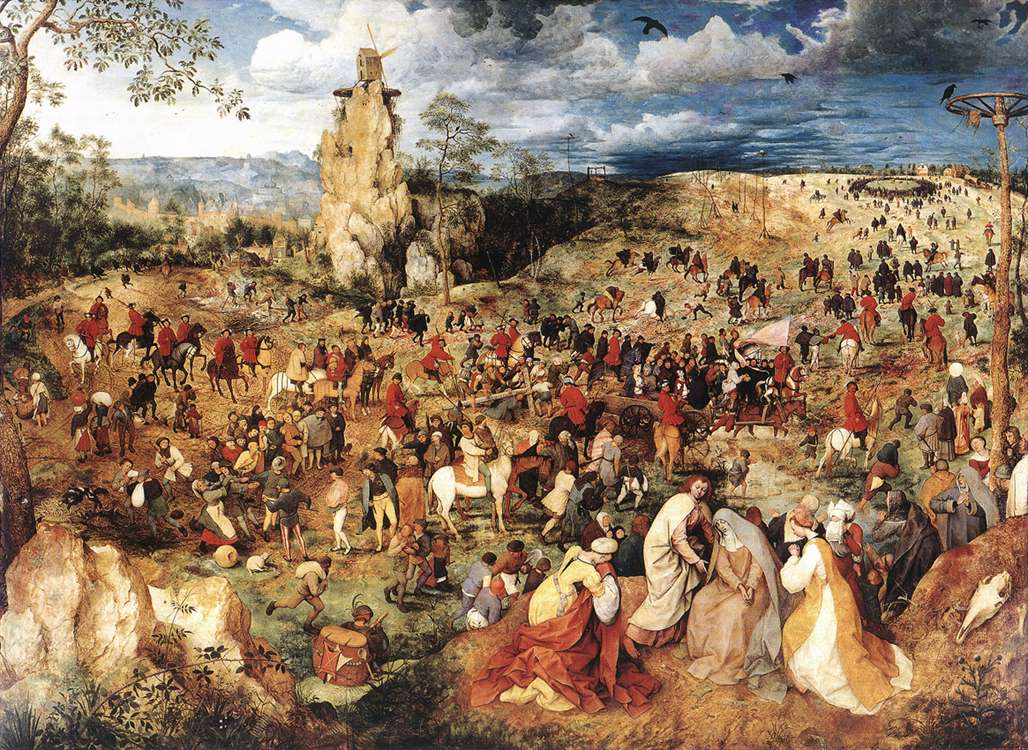

Pieter Bruegel the Elder
The Procession to Calvary, 1564

Kunsthistorisches Museum

Fine arts

- AedW I, p. 174
Listed as an example of Brueghel's depictions of farm workers, craftsmen, peasants, "(...) whether they, led Jesus to crucifixion,"

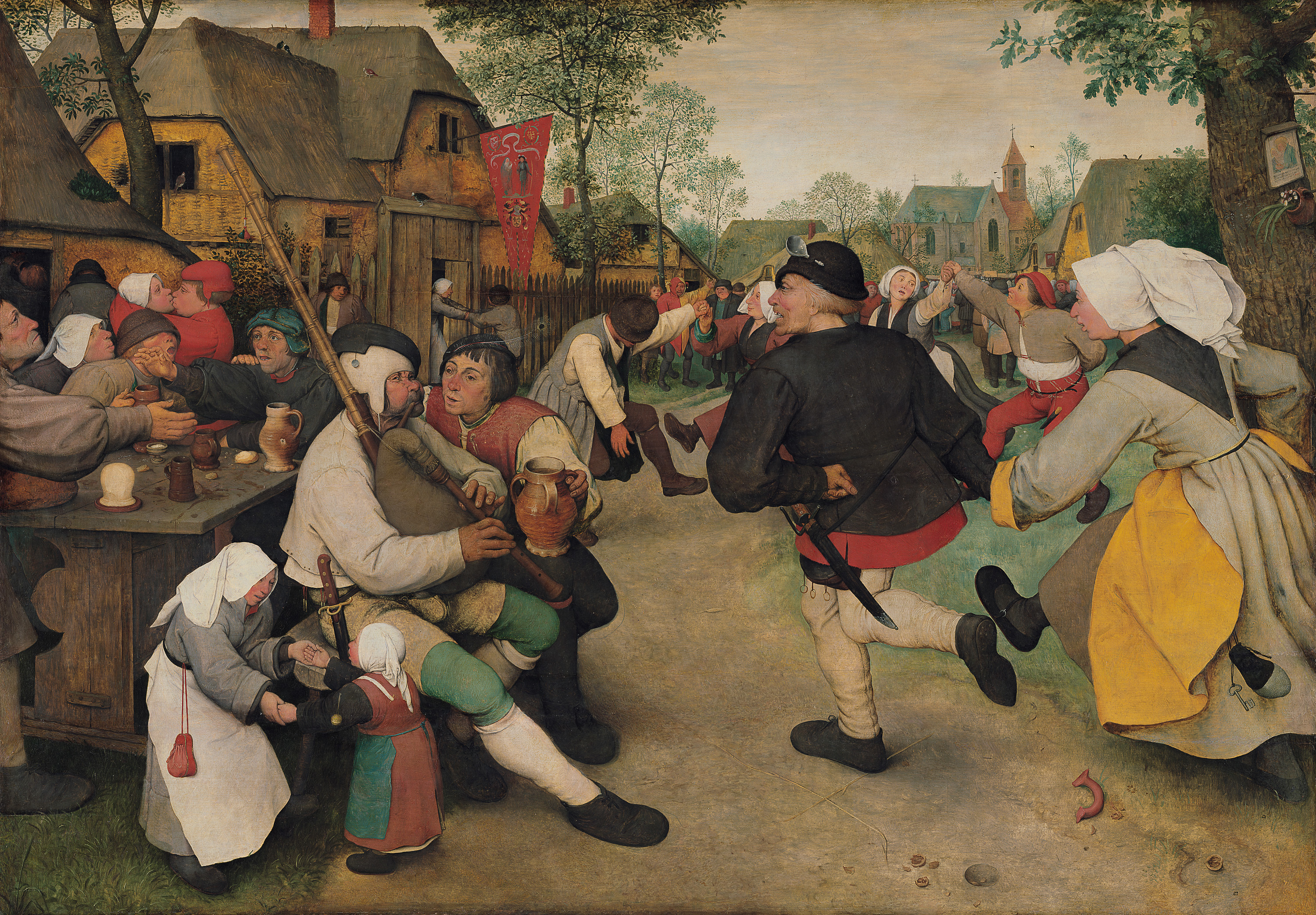

Pieter Bruegel the Elder
The Peasant Dance, 1568

Kunsthistorisches Museum

Fine arts

- AedW I, p. 174
Listed as an example of Brueghel's depictions of farm workers, craftsmen, peasants, "(...) or whether they were spinning in the round dance at the fair."

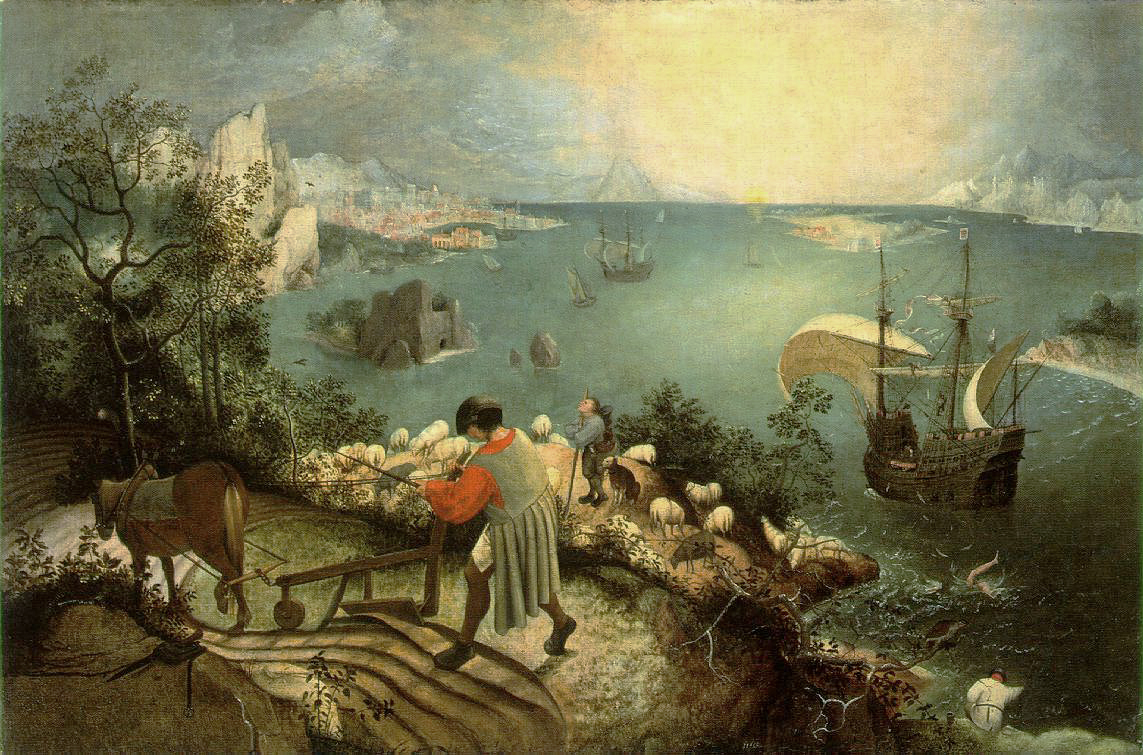

Pieter Bruegel the Elder
Landscape with the Fall of Icarus,1558

Royal Museums of Fine Arts of Belgium

Fine arts

- AedW I, p. 174
Description of the painting with reference to the indifferent attitude of the persons in the picture and the depiction of the aphorism:

"Kein Pflug bleibt stehn um eines Sterbenden willen. (...) The interwoven motif of the proverb was directed at the steadfastness of earthly work, but also held to its heaviness and joylessness."

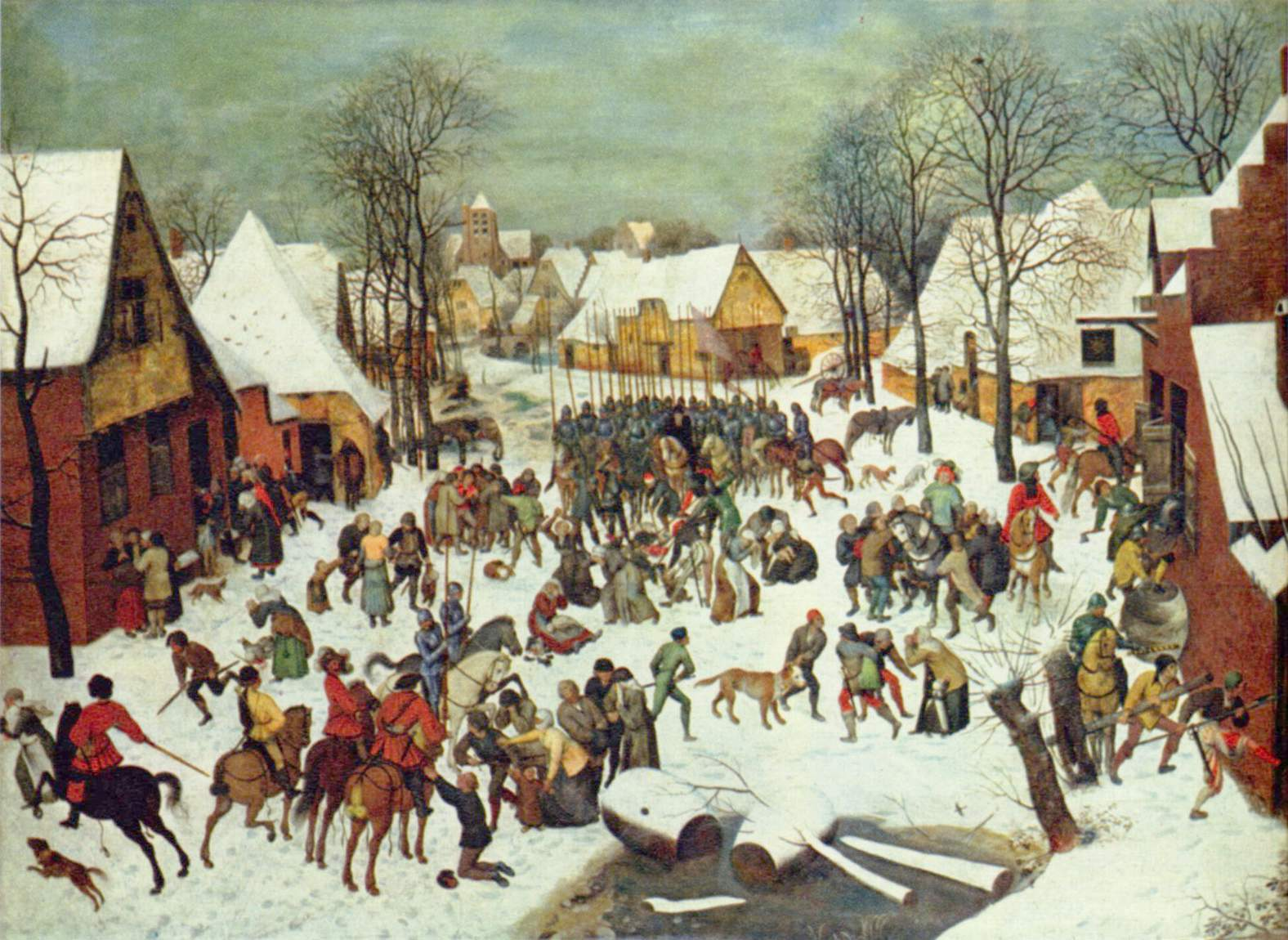

Pieter Bruegel the Elder
Massacre of the Innocents, 1565-1567

Kunsthistorisches Museum

Fine arts

- AedW I, p. 174f.
- Motif group: Massacre of the innocent
Description of the painting with reference to the nameless despair and the inescapability of the horrific:

"What took place between the inhabitants and the mercenaries, who were their equals, who were only, as always, carrying out the orders of their superiors, was unbearable, and yet it stood, in its constant gesture of horror, of cold slaughter, stamped forever in the iconic white surface".

This train of thought is continued in the following description of Franz Kafka's novel The Castle:

"This being taken by surprise under supposed shelter, this sudden irruption of the unimaginable had also become something existing in the story of the surveyor."

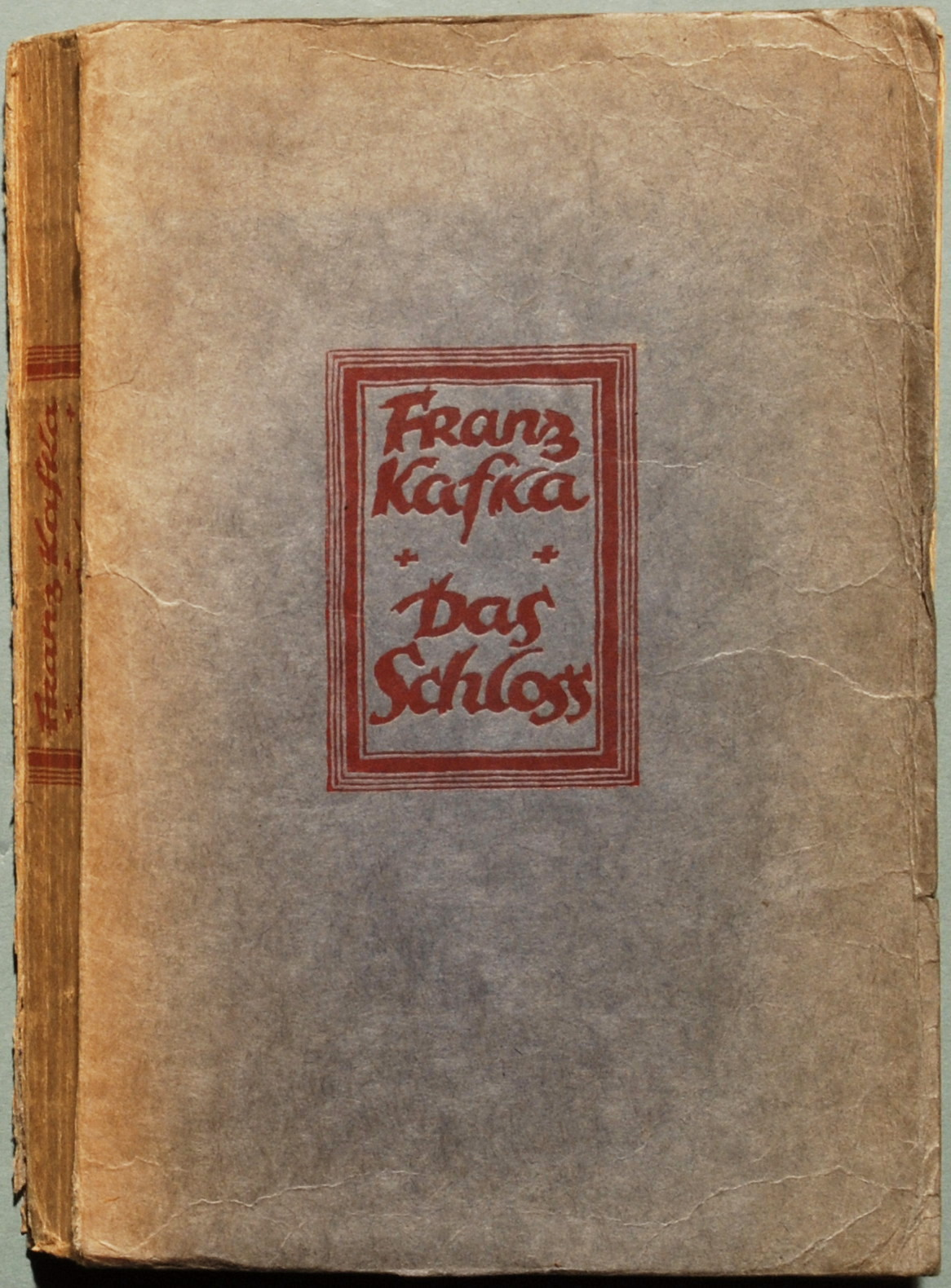

Franz Kafka
The Castle, 1922

unfinished novel

Literature The novel depicts the futile struggle of the surveyor K. for recognition, through a mysterious system represented by an all-dominating castle and its representatives.

- AedW I, p. 178 ff.
Description and explanations of what the first-person narrator learns from the novel. In particular, he sees parallels to the reality of the oppressed and exploited in the non-questioning of domination and the resulting hopelessness, and that it is precisely this that creates the situation in which the position that everyone occupies in society is not questioned, but only fought for its recognition, even if it is to do unrelated work:

"It was only suddenly felt that something important, momentous was going on, an immense, worldwide operation that we, as tiny components of the machinery, had to serve. This is how the voice of imperialism sounded to those who had hitherto been too weak to acquire knowledge about the interrelationships of economic processes. But even when we had gained an insight, we too remained equally far removed from this whirring, although we were involved in it as stokers, mechanics, load carriers, cart pushers."

Romain Rolland
Jean Christophe,1904–1912

Novel
Literature

- AedW I, S. 185
For example, in the development of workers' education:

"the language that was related to our everyday dealings had expanded, suddenly we understood poems that seemed to have nothing to do with our time cards, our inventory lists, our wage negotiations and union meetings".

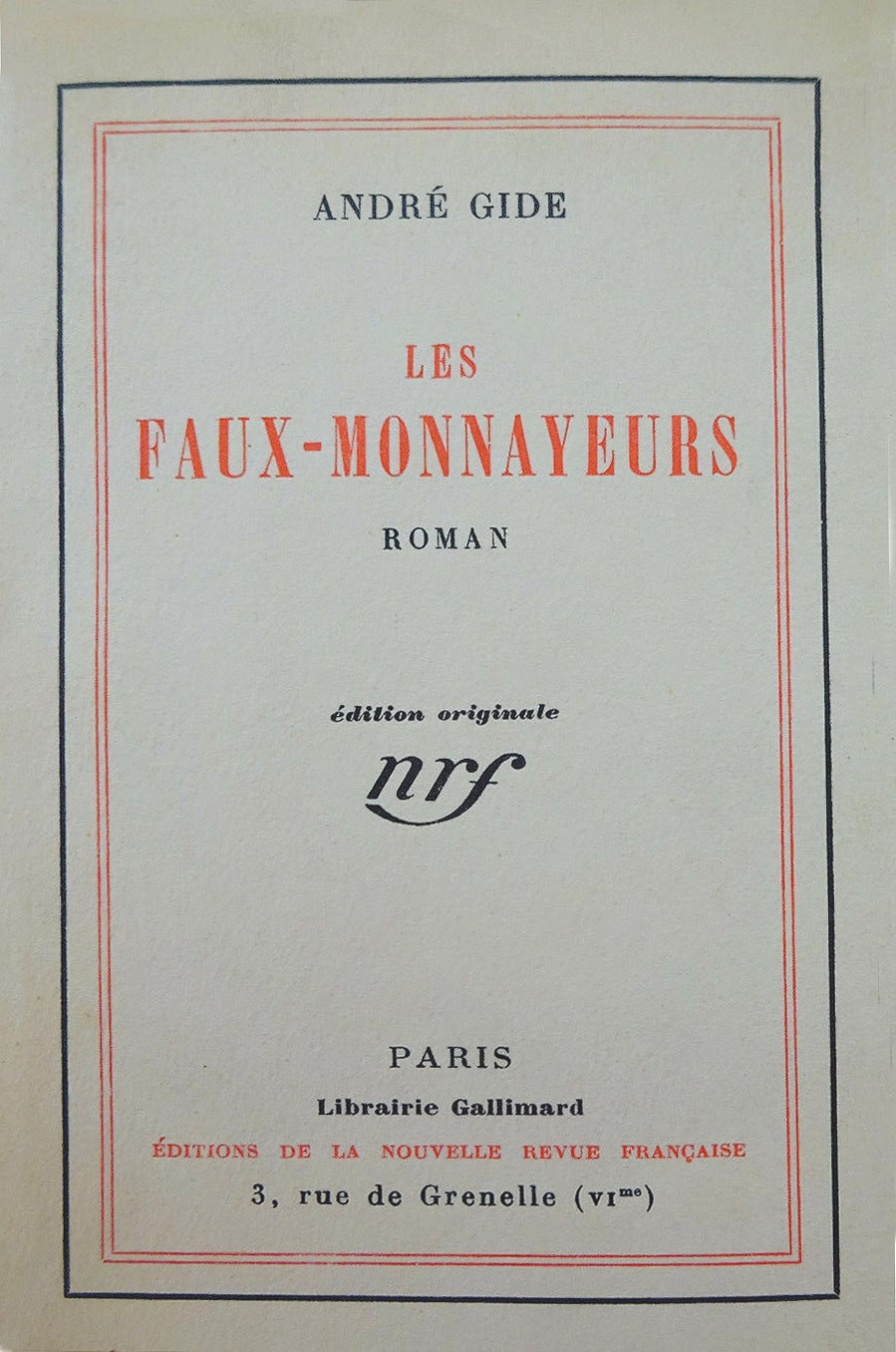

André Gide
Counterfeiters, 1925

Novel

Literature

- AedW I, p. 185
Used as an example in the development of workers' education.

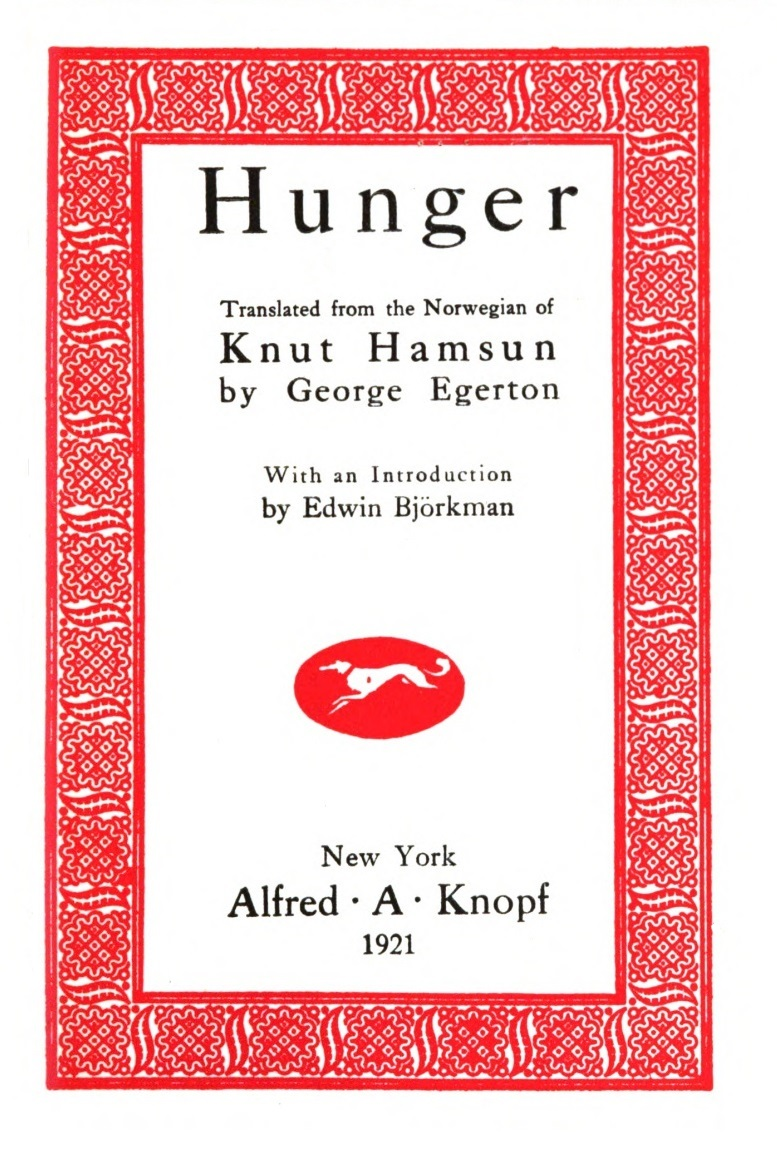

Knut Hamsun
Hunger, 1890

Novel

Literature

- AedW I, S. 185
Used as an example in the development of workers' education.

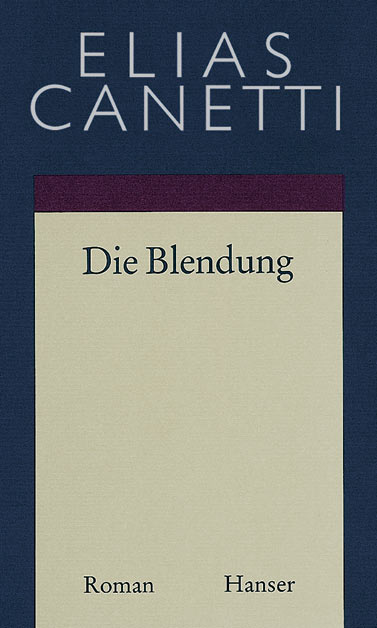

Elias Canetti
Die Blendung,1931-1932

novel
Literature
The main character of this novel, the book collector Peter Kien, lives in his 25,000-volume library. Confronted with the meanness of life, he falls into madness and burns himself and his world of books in a kind of auto-da-fé.

- AedW I, p. 186
Used in the development of workers' education:

"We had begun stammering, and in reading (...) we always returned to the zero point where our own lives had begun. (...) If the building blocks were books for us, however, Prefessor Kien, Canetti's book man, got around between literature."

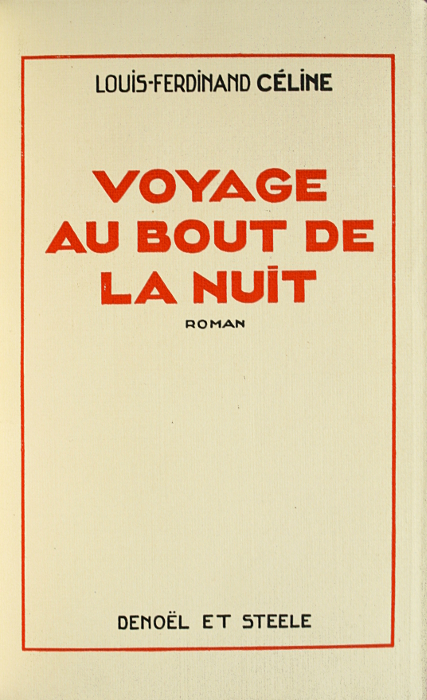

Louis-Ferdinand Céline
Journey to the End of the Night,1932

Novel

Literature

- AedW I, p. 186
Used in the development of workers' education:

"When artists who came from the bourgeoisie expressed their weariness, their unbelonging, they might still be stuck in their origins by digging in their individual pain, but by writing they were nevertheless drawing closer to those who saw their activity as an unnecessary, luxurious expense."

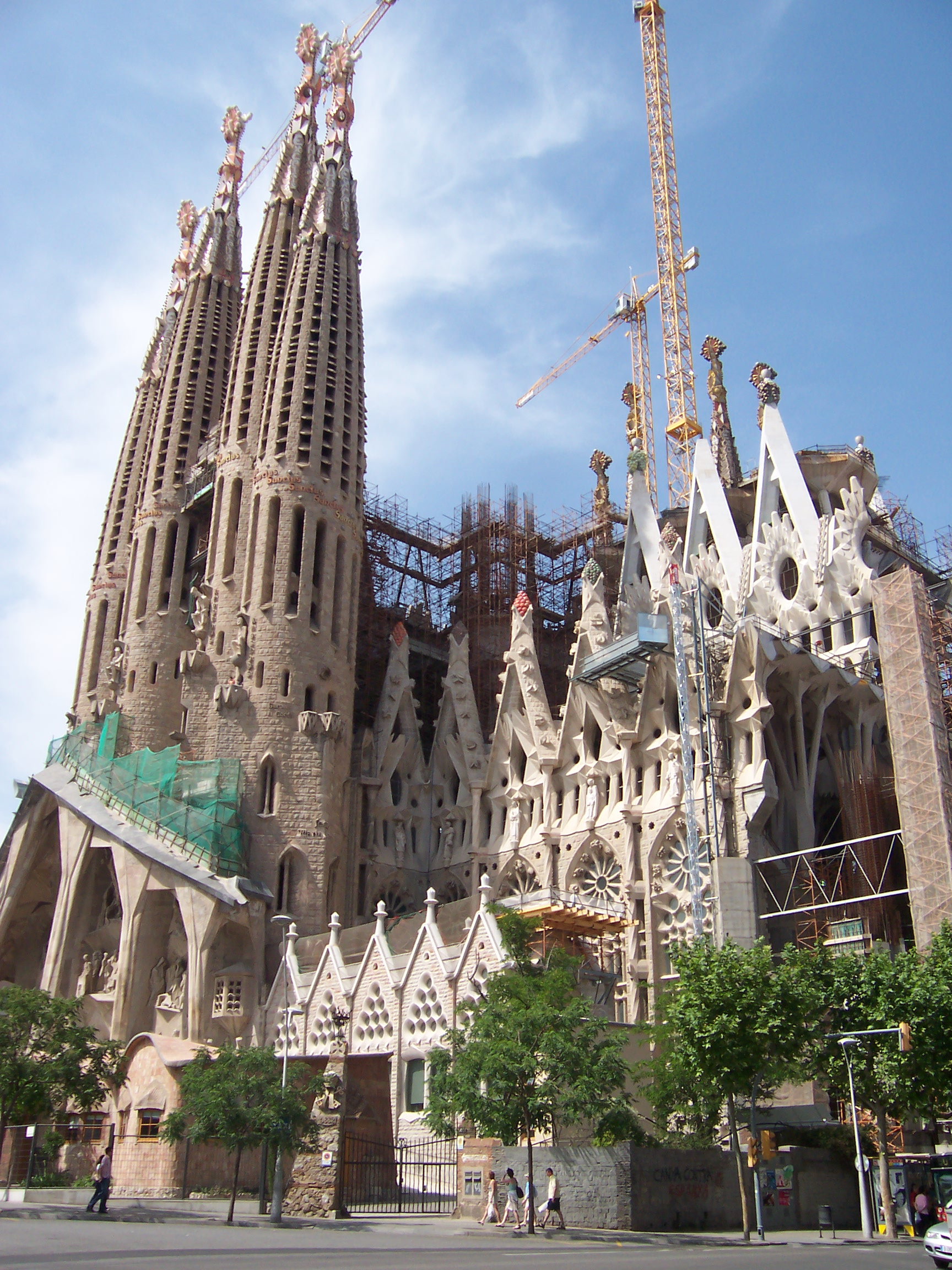

Antoni Gaudí
Sagrada Família, begun in 1882

unfinished basilica, Barcelona

Building Construction of the basilica was begun by the architect Francisco del Villars in the neo-Gothic style. At the end of 1883, Antoni Gaudí took over the construction management and completely redesigned the plans. Instead of flying buttresses and supporting pillars, he developed a hyperbolic-parabolic vault system in a complex structure supported by tree-like branching columns. Gaudí died in 1926 as a result of a tram accident. The building remains unfinished to this day.

- AedW I, pp. 193–197, 199 f., 208
Description of the building and discussion of the political contradictions that the first-person narrator reflects on during the visit. The cathedral stands as a symbol of the "banality of an empty mendacious religion" and is comparable to the tendencies of the revolutionary movement, which is held down by its leadership in petty-bourgeois idealism.

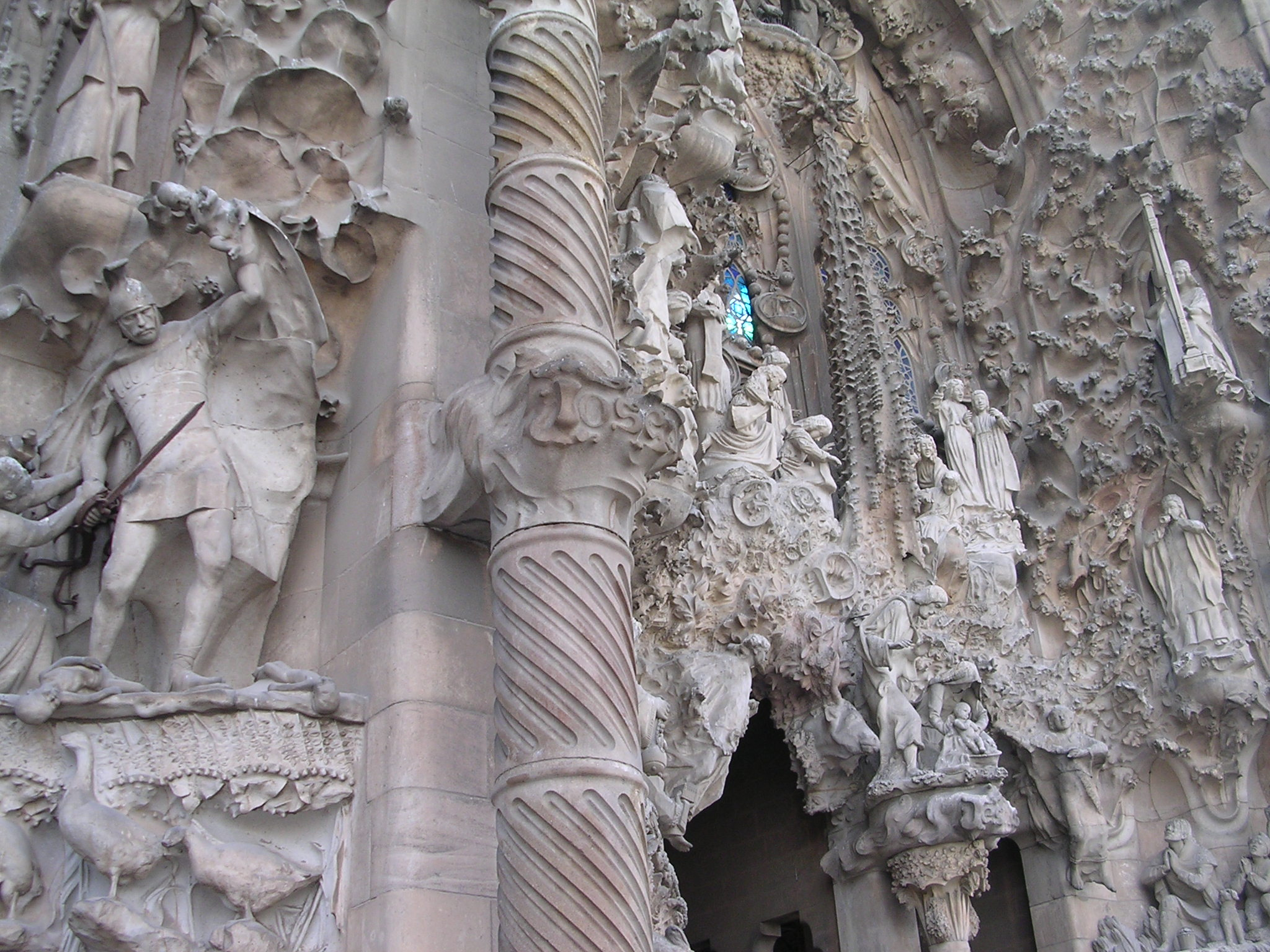

Antoni Gaudí
Portal of Hope, 1891-1900

East façade of the Sagrada Família Barcelona

Fine arts

- AedW I, p. 208
- Motif group: Bethlehemite infanticide
The motif of the Bethlehemite infanticide, discussed several times in the novel, is also found at the Sagrada Família in a sculptural group:

"the armoured warrior, with the cast-iron sword in one hand, flinging up the stolen child with the other, the woman pleading for a halt next to the child's corpse hanging down to the cackling geese."

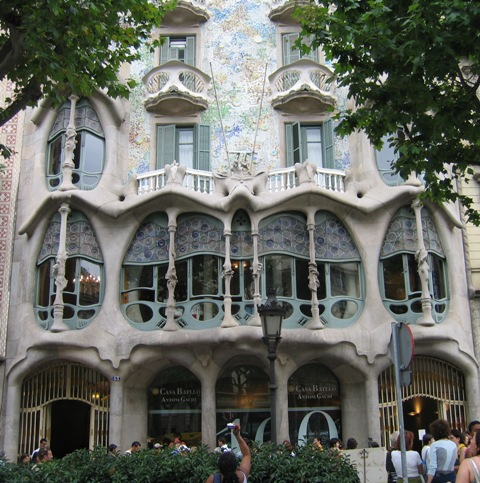

Antoni Gaudí
Casa Batlló, 1877

Building Barcelona, Passeig de Gràcia

Building

- AedW I, p. 195
The building is also visited by the protagonists during their stay in Barcelona.

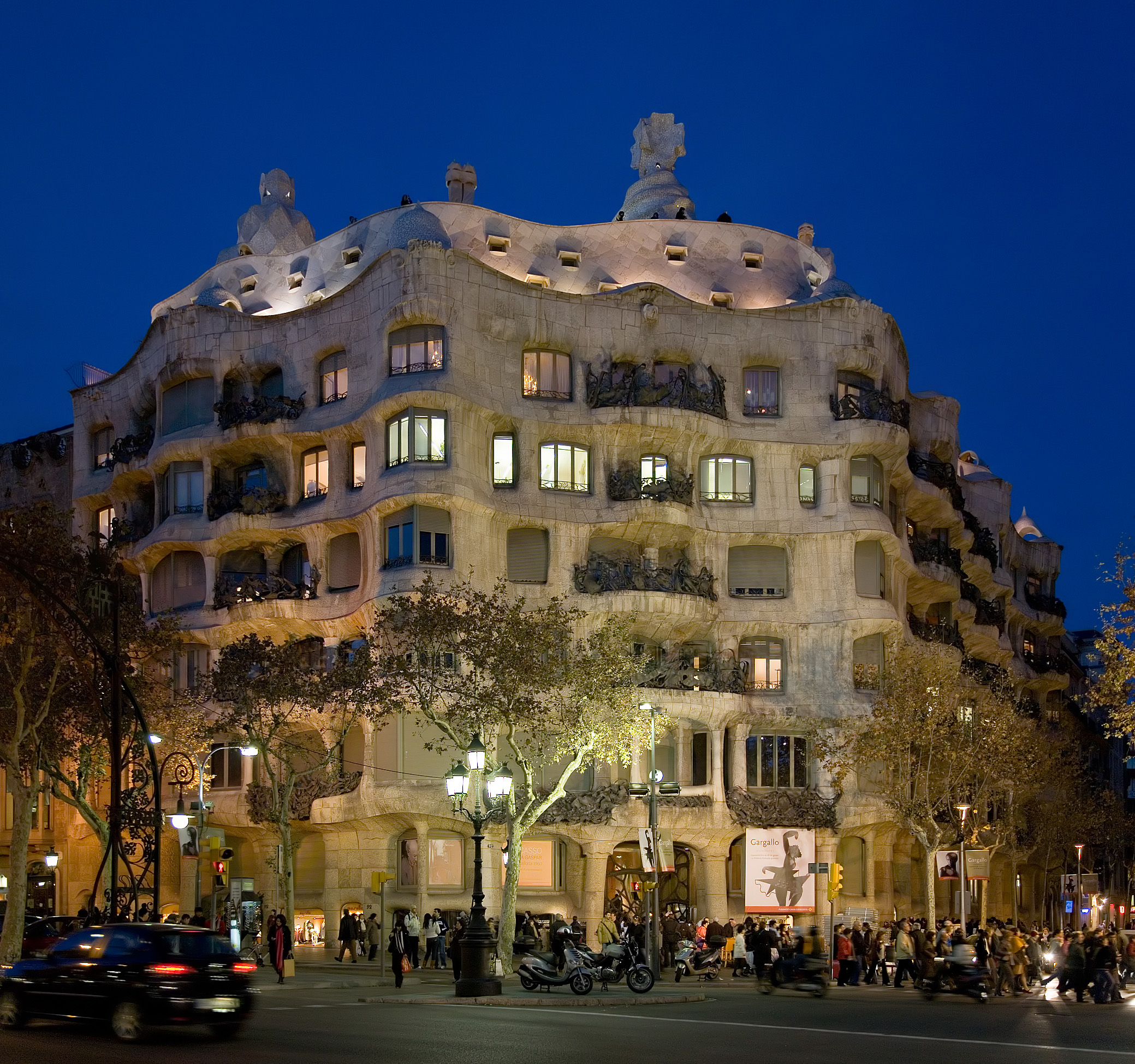

Antoni Gaudí
Casa Milà, 1906-1910

Building Barcelona, Passeig de Gràcia

Building

- AedW I, p. 195
The building is also visited by the protagonists during their stay in Barcelona.

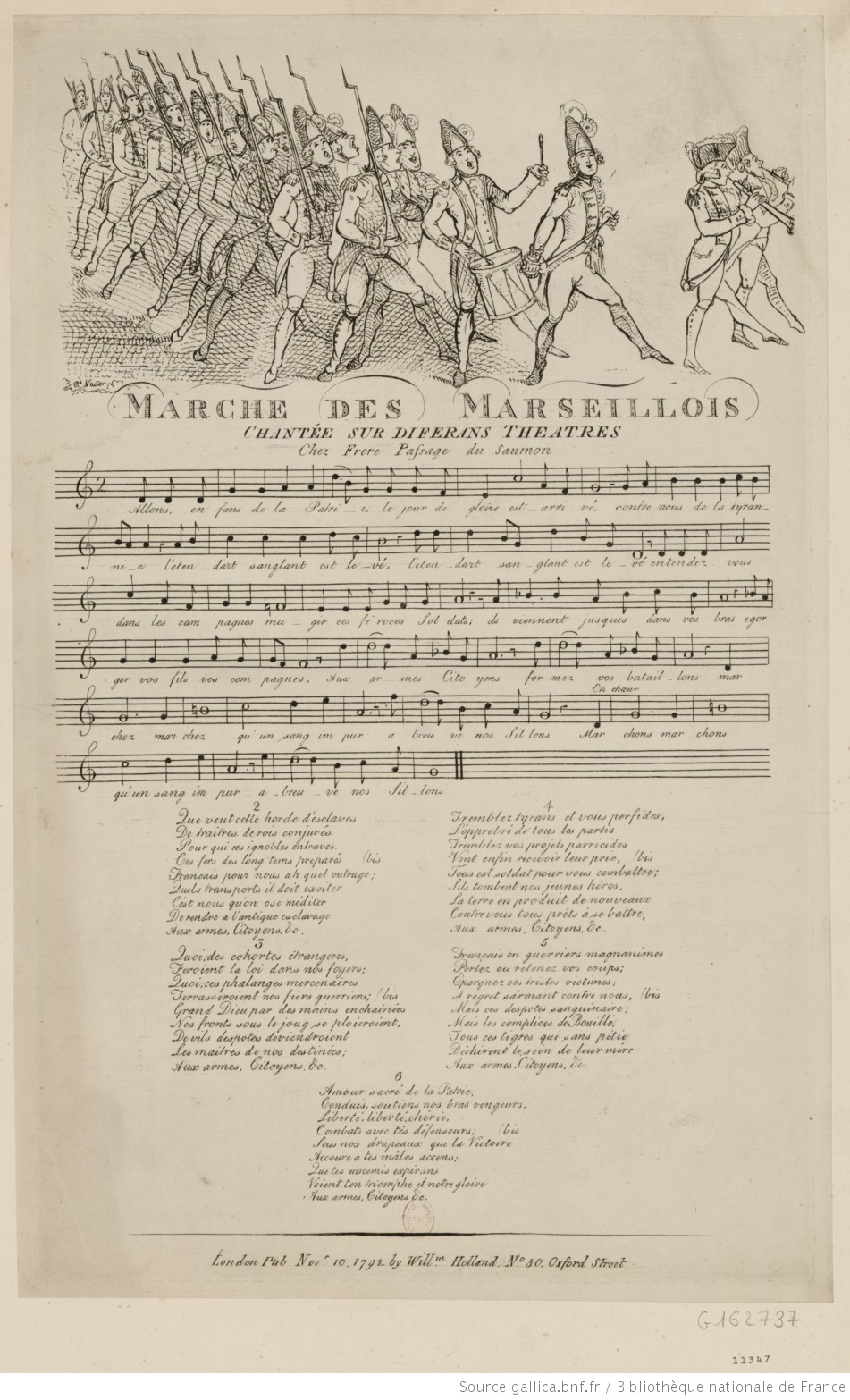

Claude Joseph Rouget de Lisle
La Marseillaise, 1792

Song
French National Anthem

Music

- AedW I, p. 208
A discussion about the necessity of slogans and the banality of contexts, compared to Gaudí's Sagrada Família:

"Every movement needed its simplifications and summaries, also the text of the Marseillaise, the Internationale had words for those concerned that they had long known by heart and yet wanted to hear again and again".

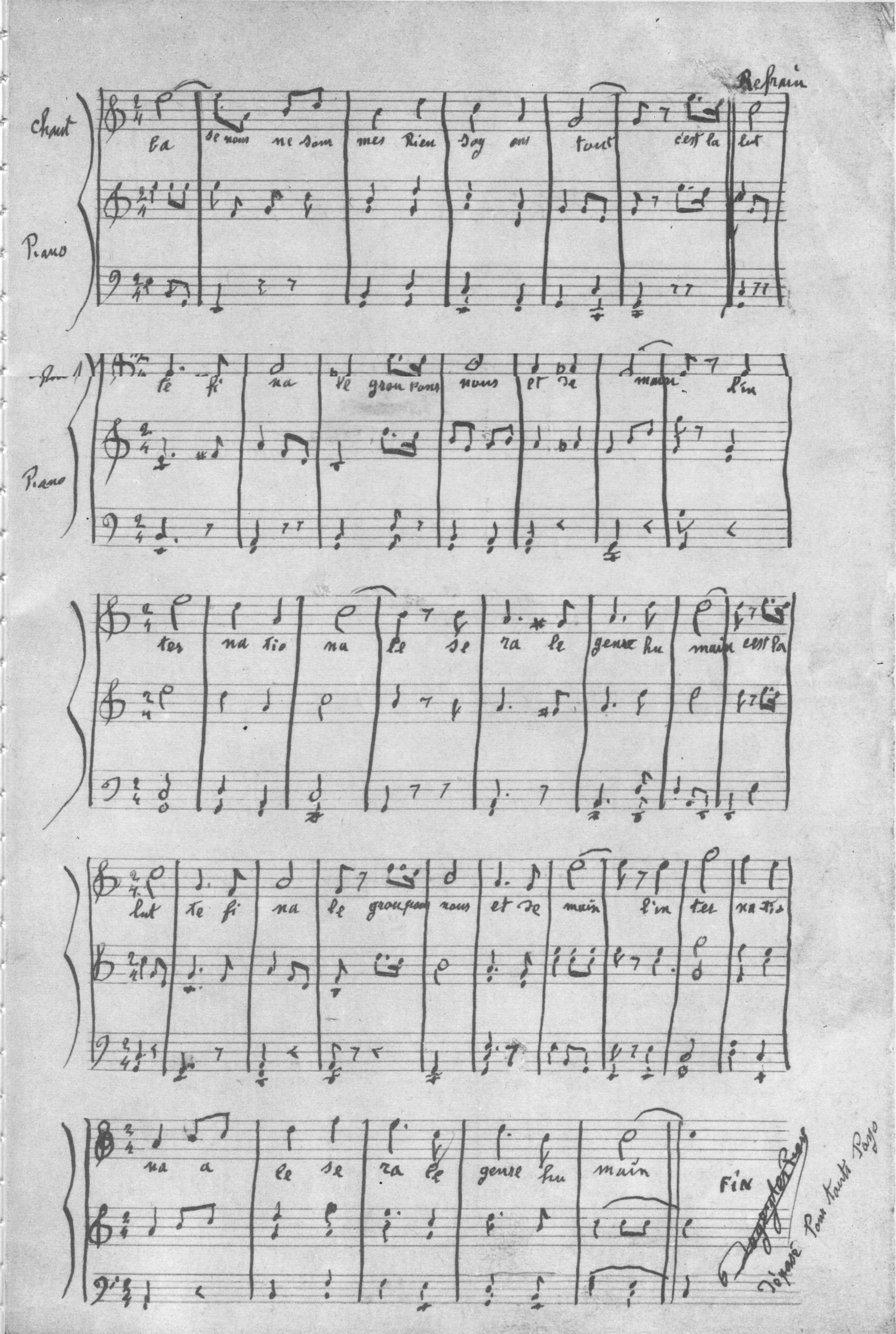

Eugène Pottier (Text),

Pierre Degeyter (Melody)

The Internationale, 1871-1888

Song
Hymn of the Socialist Workers' Movement

Music

- AedW I, p. 208
A discussion about the necessity of slogans and the banality of contexts, compared to Gaudí's Sagrada Família:

"Every movement needed its simplifications and summaries, also the text of the Marseillaise, the Internationale had words for those concerned that they had long known by heart and yet wanted to hear again and again".

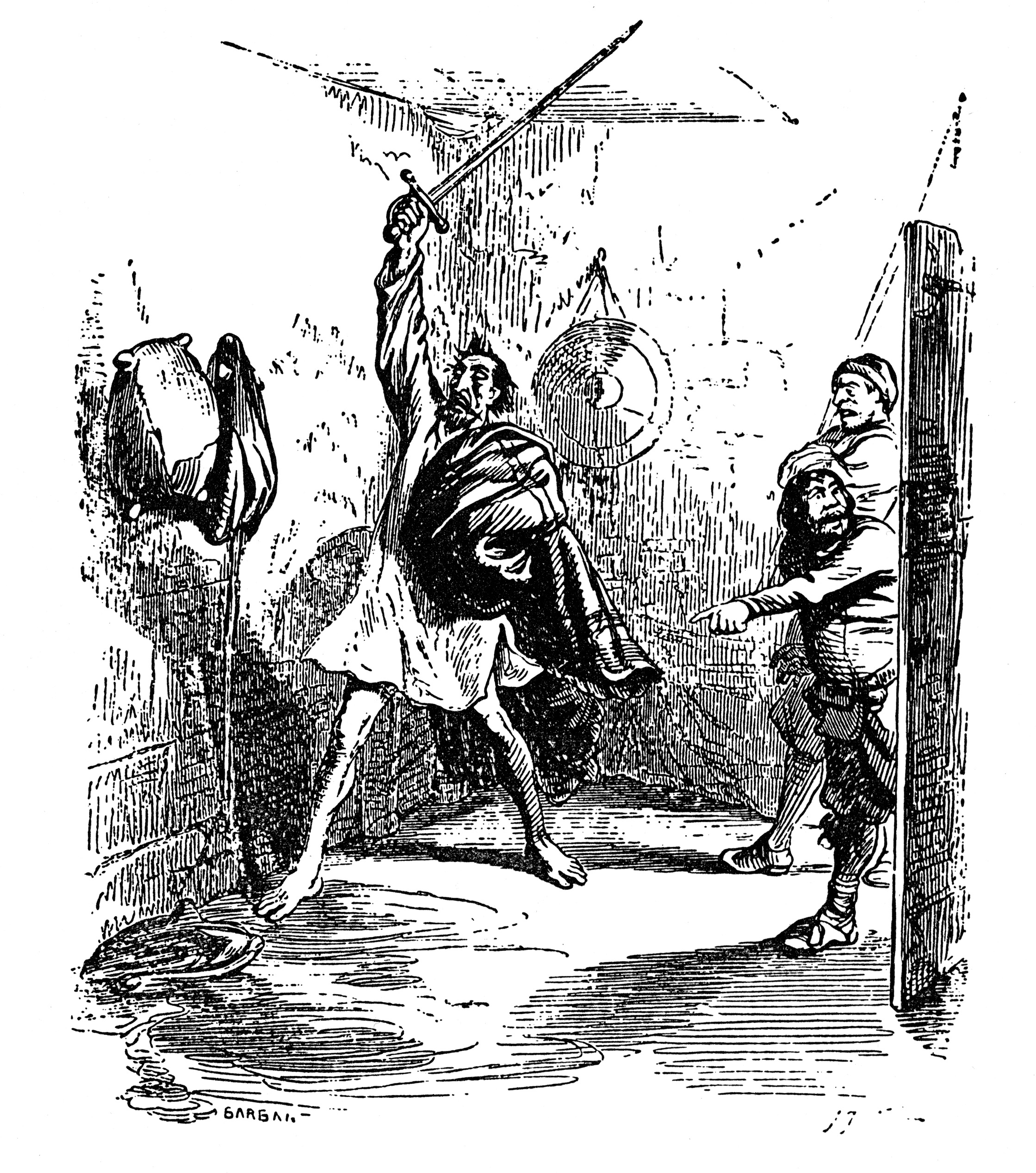

Miguel de Cervantes
Don Quixote, 1605-1615

Novel

Literature With the sensuous Squire Don Quixote of La Mancha, Cervantes parodies the contemporary popular romances of chivalry with the admonition of how their excessive reading could rob the mind.

- AedW I, pp. 208f., 242, 257
The figure of Don Quixote is performed repeatedly, especially during the first-person narrator's stay in Spain: as an epic of Spain

"in which there was a frenetic search for overcoming evil, for justice, for human dignity, and in which the failure of falsehood, wickedness, deceit always prevailed"

as the motif of a mural in Albacete, in trains of thought on heroic productions.

Background
International Brigades

The International Brigades were volunteer units that fought on the side of the Spanish Republic against the Franco-led fascist units of the National Spanish Coalition during the Spanish Civil War from 1936 to 1938.

- AedW I, p. 224
List of artists who joined or supported the International Brigades.

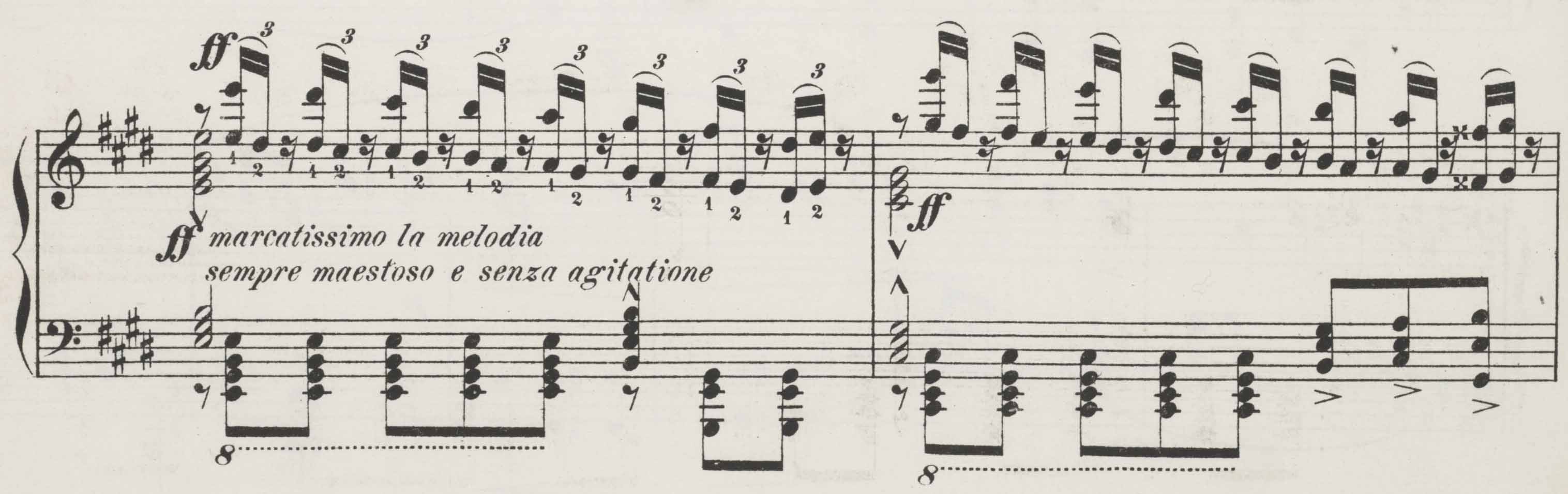

Richard Wagner
Tannhäuser, 1842-1845

Opera

Music

- AedW I, p. 225
Emblematic of a gathering of internationalists in a former palace in Albacete that served as an infirmary. The role music by Wagner and others who were there was played on a pianola:

“The red flag that hung from the glass roof high up to the gallery on the first floor (...) was part of the attempt to bring about a change in the nature of the requisitioned building, but the perforated rolls that had been pushed into the piano case at the beginning of the meeting (...) had rather hammered in the ghostliness.”

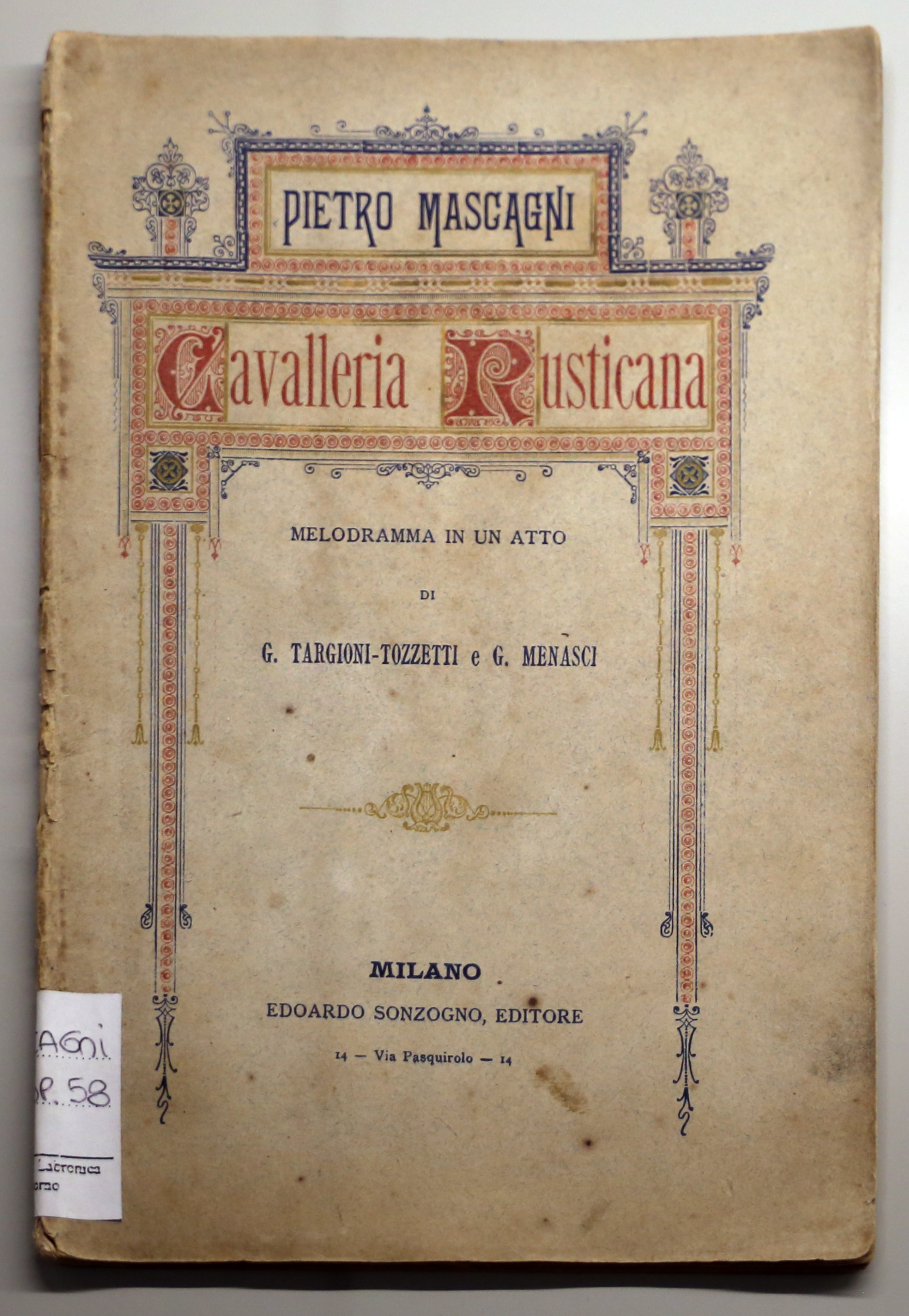

Pietro Mascagni
Cavalleria rusticana, 1890

Opera

Music

- AedW I, p. 225
Emblematic of a gathering of internationalists in a former palace in Albacete that served as an infirmary. The role music by Mascagni and others who were there was played on a pianola.

Jean Sibelius
Valse triste, 1904

Waltz

Music

- AedW I, p. 225
Emblematic of a gathering of internationalists in a former palace in Albacete that served as an infirmary. The role music by Mascagni and others who were there was played on a pianola.

Giuseppe Verdi
March from Aida, 1871

Opera

Music

- AedW I, p. 256
Emblematic of a gathering of internationalists in a former palace in Albacete that served as an infirmary. The role music by Mascagni and others who there was played on a pianola.

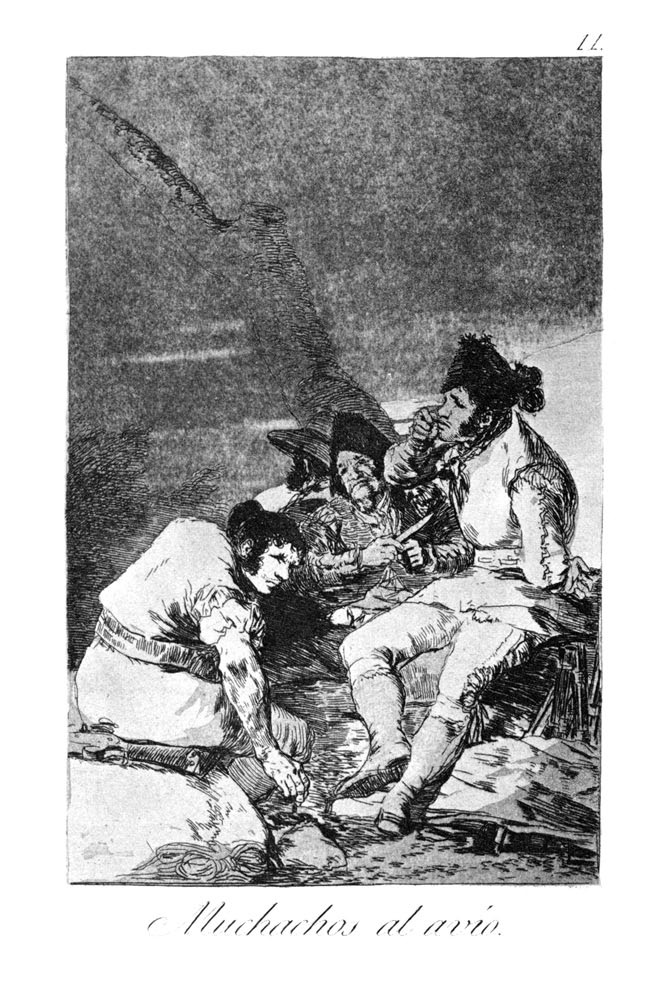

Francisco de Goya
Los caprichos, 1796-1797

80 aquatint etchings

Fine Arts This series of prints with numerous portraits is a critique of Spanish social life, especially of the nobility and the clergy.

- AedW I, p. 271
The first-person narrator describes his ideas about the country and the republic of Spain as influenced, among other things, by Goya's satirical works, the Caprichos.

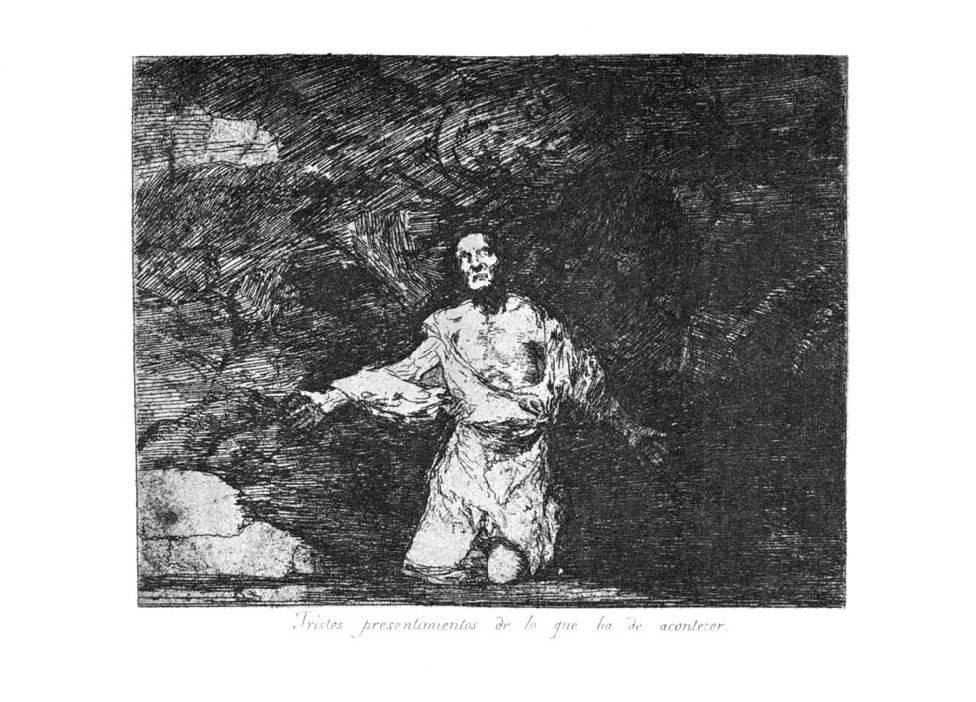

Francisco de Goya
The Disasters of War,1810-1814

82 etchings

Fine Arts The etchings from the series Schrecken des Krieges (Horrors of War) depict the atrocities of Napoleon's soldiers in the fight against the rebellious Spanish population.

- AedW I, p. 271
- Motif group: War
The first-person narrator's ideas about the country and the republic of Spain are influenced, among other things, by Goya's graphic series of disasters. They are used in the novel as a metaphor in the sense of the title of the first sheet in the series "Sad Forebodings of What is Going to Happen".

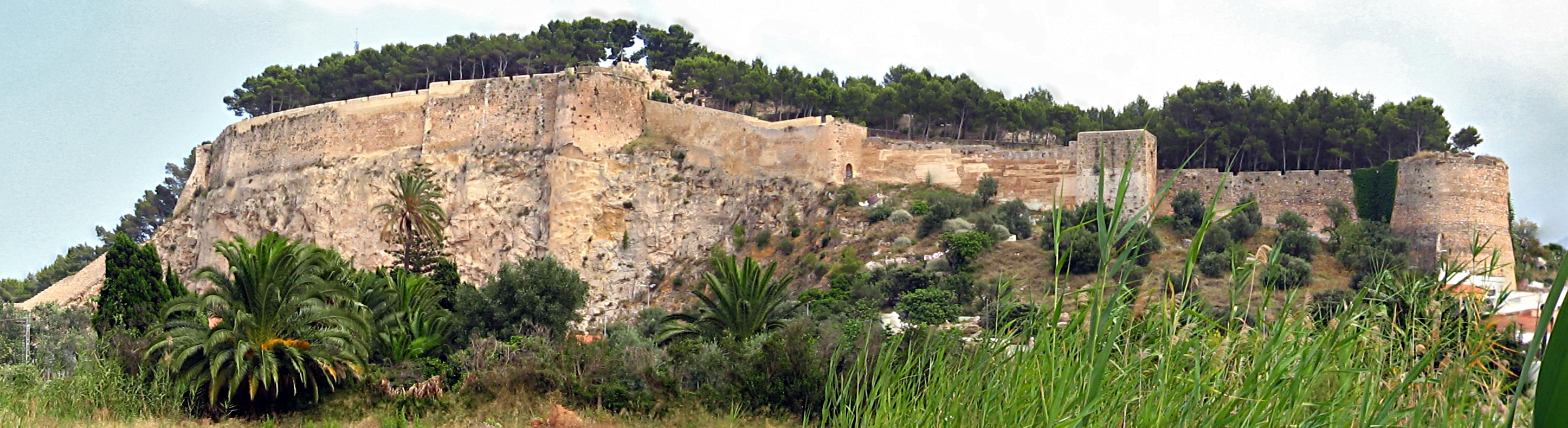

Middle Ages
Castillo de Denia, 11th and 12th century

Dénia

Building The Castillo is the ruin of a fortress on the castle hill of Dénia dating from the Arabic period. The early history of Dénia, with influences from Phoenician, Greek, Carthaginian and Roman settlers, is not proven. Equally controversial is the assumption that Dénia is identical with the city of Hēmeroskopeion or that the name derives from a Phoenician temple of Diana.

- AedW I, p. 314, 320 ff
Description and examination of the Spanish history of colonialism from antiquity through the Reconquista to the Spanish Civil War.

Pablo Picasso
Guernica, 1937

Madrid, Museo Reina Sofía

Fine Art
The painting was made in reaction to the destruction of the Spanish town of Guernica by the air raid of the German Condor Legion on 26 April 1937.

- AedW I, pp. 332–337, 339 f., 343, 348;
- AedW II, pp. 38, 57, 299
- Motif group: Bethlehemite infanticide
- Motif group: War
- Motif group: Images of horror
Discussion and interpretation of the painting, both on the basis of the process of creation documented photographically by Dora Maar, the art-historical debate of the contemporary novel, and in detailed comparison with myths, motifs and in the context of other works of art.

"Picasso had most clearly expressed the impossibility of doing justice to the experience of other people, relying only on his own perceptions, his subjective associations. He was not interested in naming the number of bombs dropped, the number of houses destroyed, the number of wounded and dead. That could be read elsewhere. He waited until the clouds of smoke and dust had dispersed, until the moaning and screaming had died down, and only then, alone in the room with the painting surface, did he ask himself what Guernica was, and when it took shape before him, as an open city, as a city of the homeless, did it become a tremendous warning of the kind of visitations that could still come. Guernica was the beginning of a series whose end was not yet in sight".

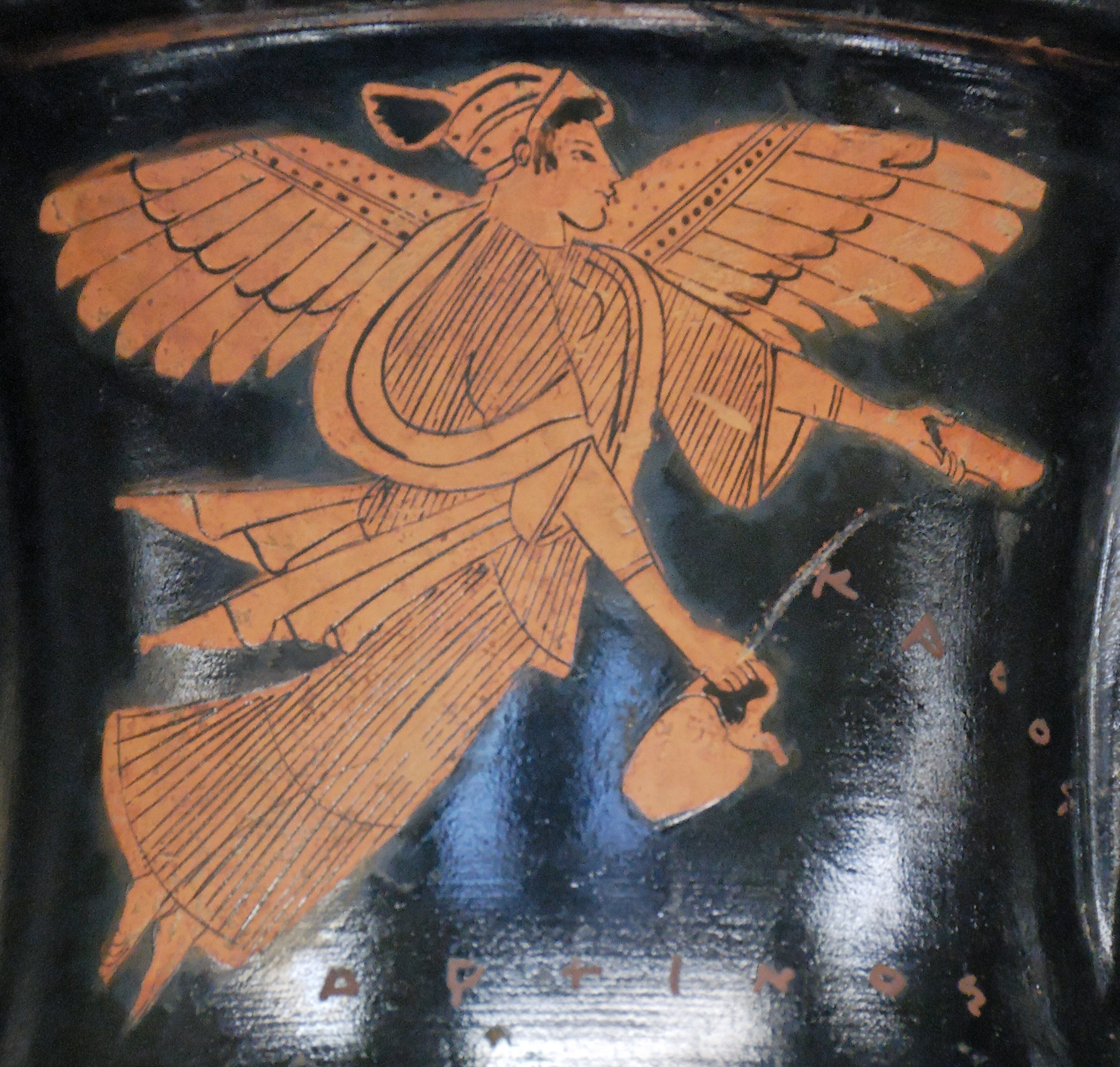

Greek mythology
Nike

Mythology

The goddess of victory Nike is almost invariably depicted with wings in art.

- AedW I, p. 333, 341
The goddess Nike is recognised in the novel both in Picasso's Guernica,

"Towards the waving mane stretched this clump of hands on the cloud-like arm, bearing the poor paraffin candlestick, (...) and there was something peculiar about this ancient light, which with such sweeping gesture was pierced in through the narrow hatch by a Nike whose other hand rested in the shape of a star between the breasts."

as in the figure of the femme du peuple in Delacroix's Liberty Leads the People:

"... with her face turned to one side, resembling the Nike who stretched her immense profile into Picasso's pictorial space. In her fleshy fullness, her fist clenched around her shanked gun, her heavy thigh thrust forward, she indicated the stage at which idea becomes material violence."

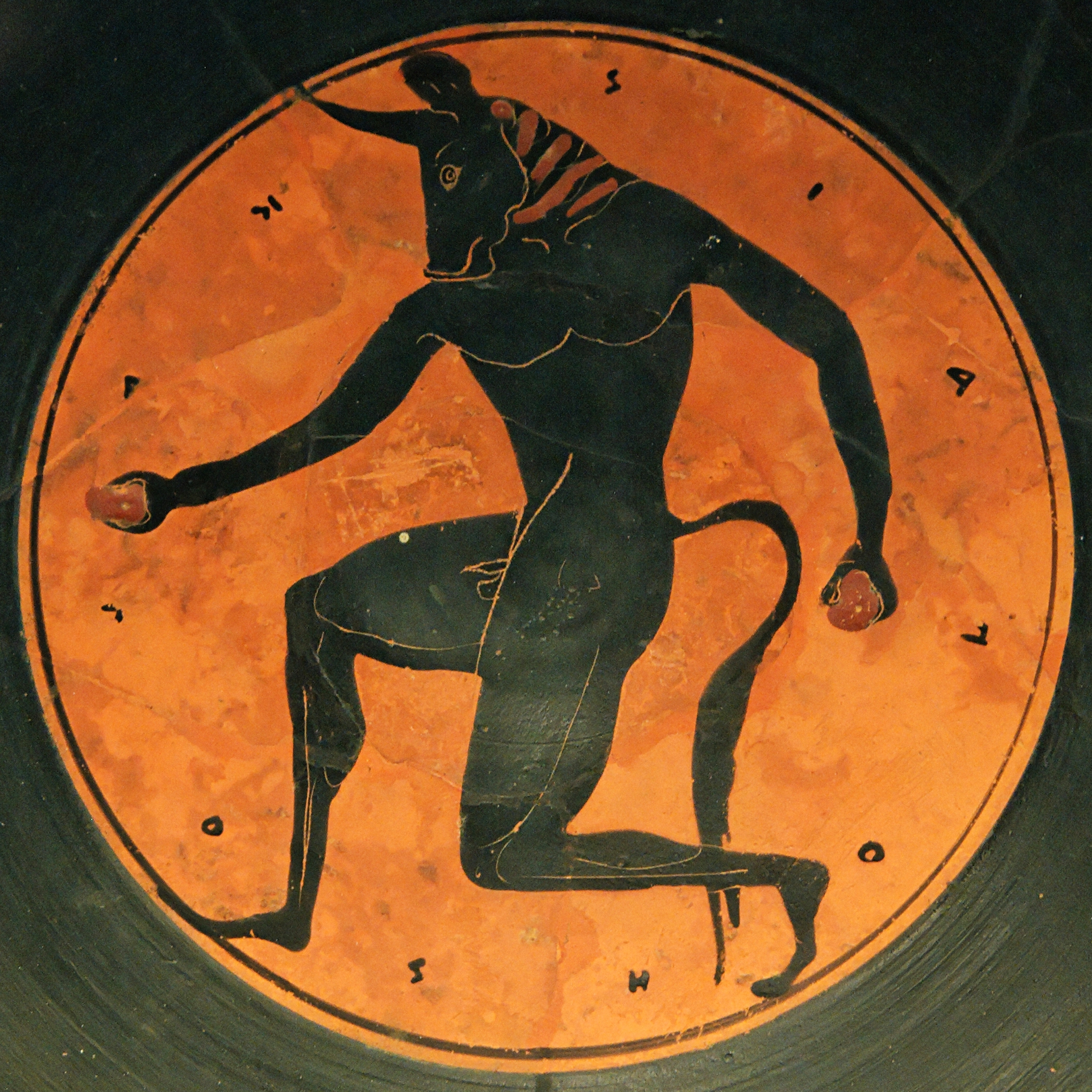

Greek mythology
Minotaur

Mythology

Son of Queen Pasiphae of Crete and the Cretan bull, born with the body of a man and the head of a bull.

- AedW I, p. 334 ff.
In the discussion about Picasso's Guernica, the depiction of the bull is equated with the mythological hybrid of the Minotaur:

"And since the bull became more and more human, (...) we thought we saw the durability of the Spanish people represented in the Taurus."

Furthermore, its importance in Picasso's world of motifs is questioned and his etching Minotauromachy is used for further comparison.

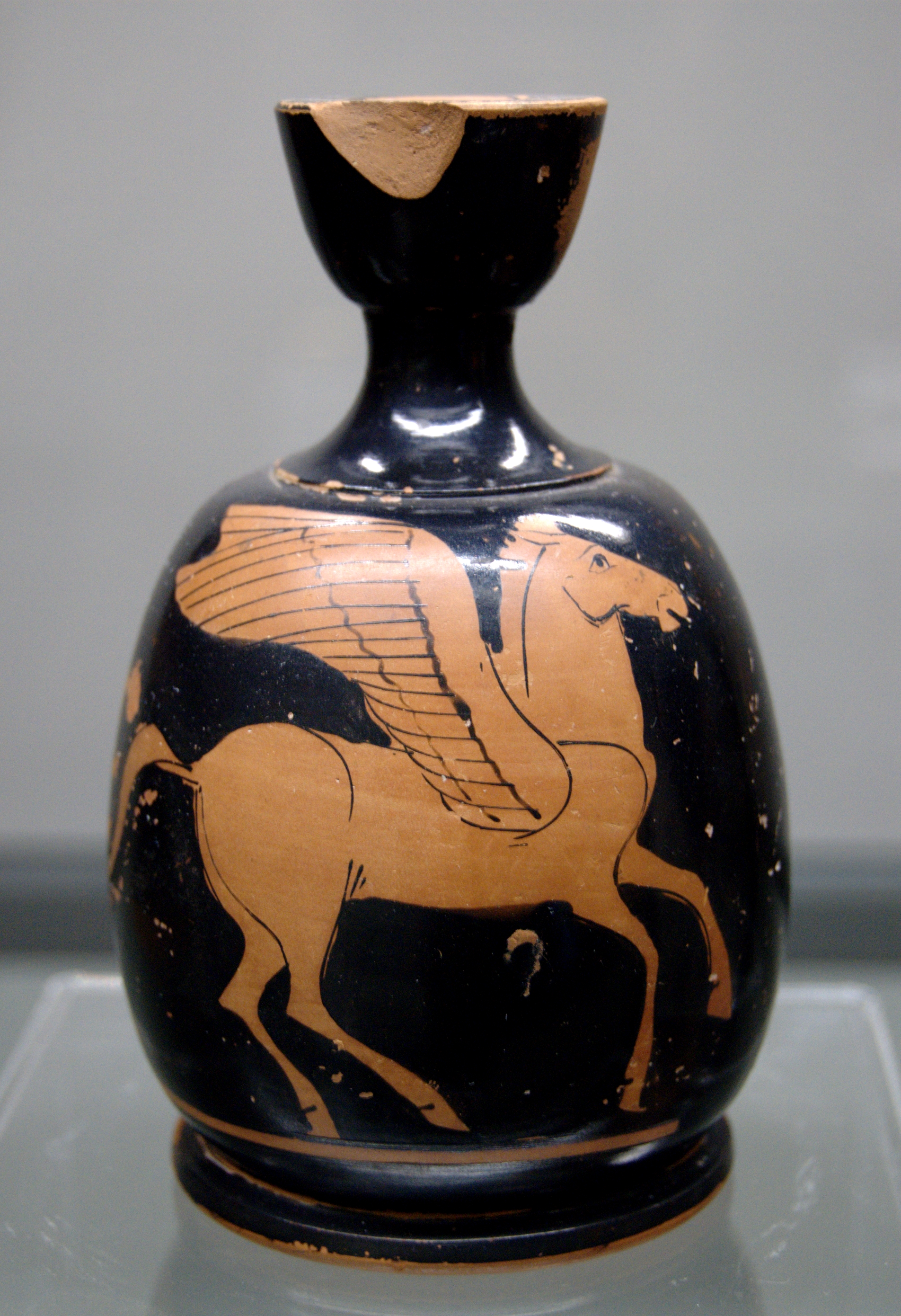

Greek mythology
Pegasus

Mythology

Pegasus, the child of the sea god Poseidon and the gorgon Medusa, he sprung from Medusa's neck when she was beheaded by the hero Perseus. But Perseus could only kill Medusa, whose gaze turned everyone to stone, by only looking at her in a mirror.

- AedW I, p. 334, 339
In the first versions of Picasso's Guernica, Pegasus initially occupied a central representation; in the final version he is finally missing. The protagonists discuss the significance of this absence and develop it further on mythology:

"Turning away from the Gorgo, only catching her grimacing face in a mirror, Perseus had killed her, and this evasion was also Picasso's. The attacking violence remained invisible in his painting. (...) Perseus, Dante, Picasso remained whole and handed down what their mirror had caught, the head of Medusa, the circles of the Inferno, the blasting of Guernica."

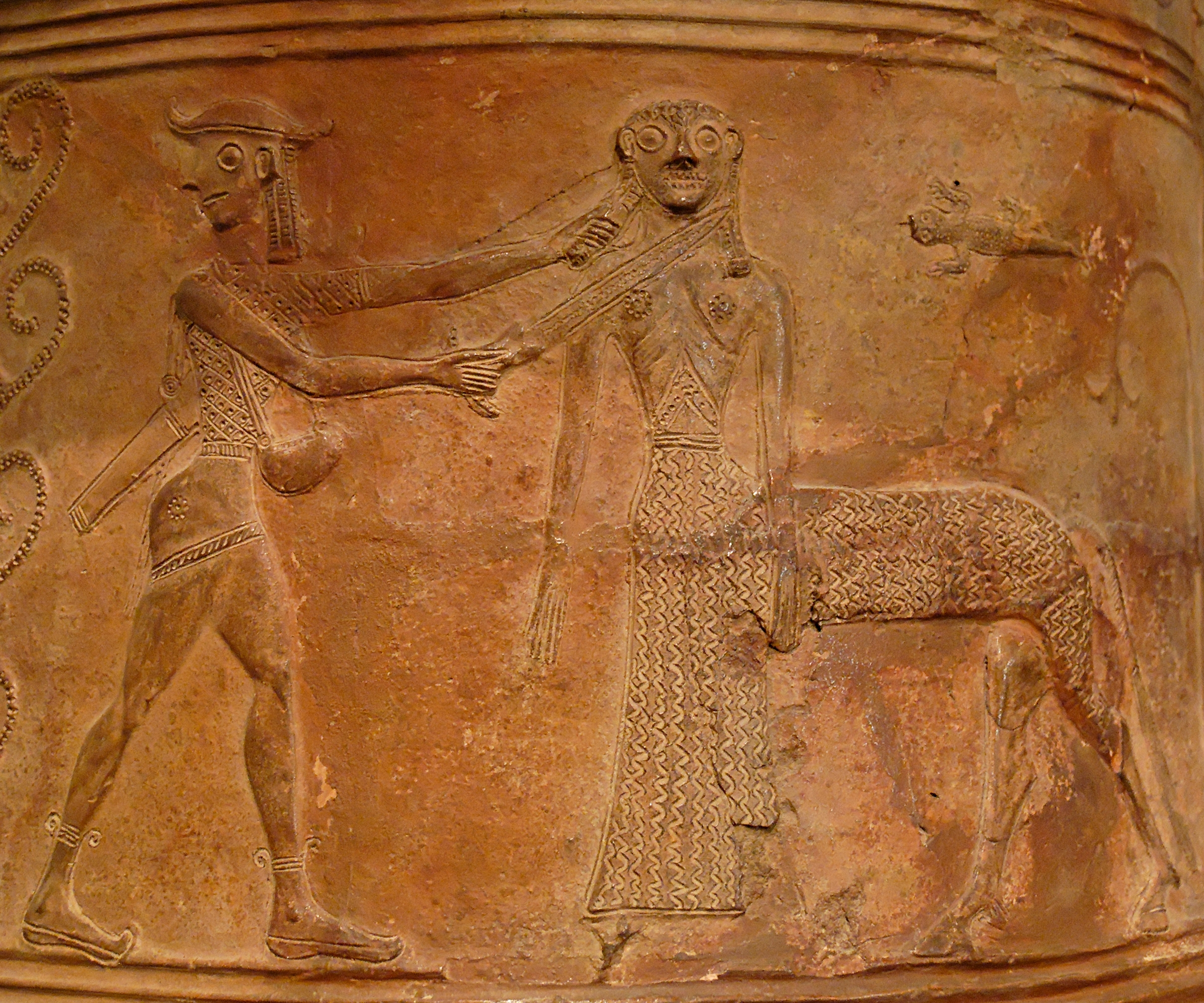

Greek mythology
Medusa

Mythology
Medusa is the daughter of the sea deities Phorcys and Ceto. She was transformed out of jealousy by Athena into a Gorgon, a winged monster with serpentine hair, scaly armour, glowing eyes and a tongue hanging out. The sight of Medusa turned everyone to stone as protection against enemies who could have killed her because of her mortality.

- AedW I, p. 339
- AedW II, p. 14, p. 65
The myth of Medusa, taken up in the discussion of the Pegasos painting, has further references throughout the novel, for example in the title of the painting by Géricault and in the 2nd volume in the description of the city of Paris.

Pablo Picasso
The Dream and Lie of Franco, 1937

etchings, picture plates with 18 pictures on 2 plates

Fine arts

- AedW I, p. 335
Description and inclusion of the etchings in the interpretation of the painting Guernica:

"In the sequence of images (…) the mollusc-like, trunk-covered caudillo first attacked the image of the arts with a pickaxe and, surrounded by barbed wire, offered sacrifices to the idol of money, then the bull furiously took his horn, and the tears streamed down them People's faces rose towards the stations of the duel of life and death, until in the end only the squatting woman remained, in front of the burning ruins of the house, with the corpse of the child in her arms."

Pablo Picasso
Mother with dead child, 1937

Madrid, Museo Reina Sofía

Fine arts

- AedW I, p. 335
- Motif group: (Bethlehemite) infanticide
The motif of a mother with a dead child, particularly in the horrific images of the Massacre of the Innocents in Bethlehem, is taken up repeatedly in the novel. In the discussion of the painting Guernica, it forms an iconographic transition to the painting of the Minotauromachy. Elsewhere in the novel, the motif can be found in Pieter Brueghel, as a fresco by Giotto di Bondone in the Arena Chapel, and in sculptural groups on Antoni Gaudí's Sagrada Família.

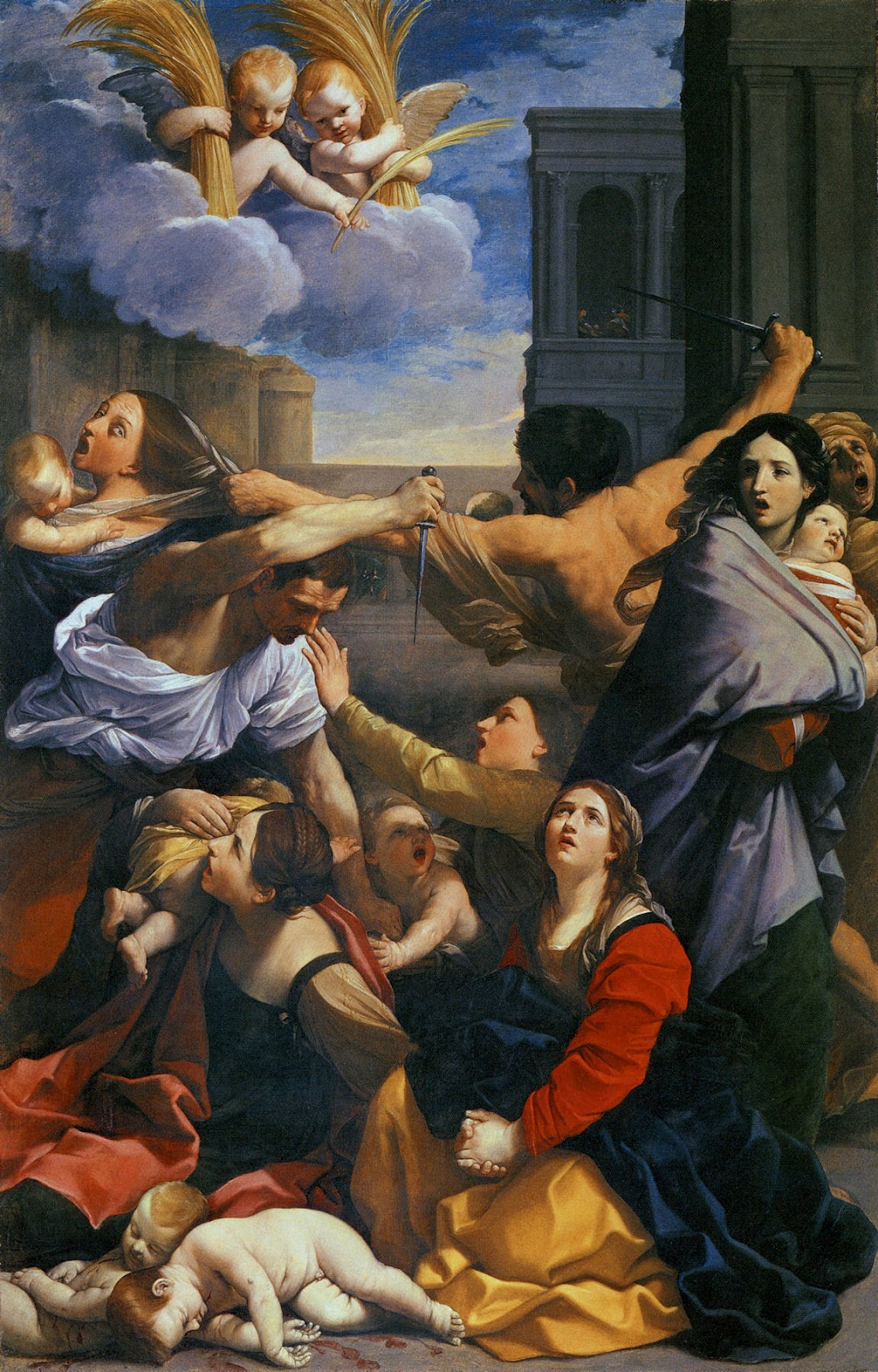

Guido Reni
Massacre of the Innocents, 1611–1612

Bologna, Pinacoteca Nazionale di Bologna

Fine arts

AedW I, p. 335 Motif group: Bethlehemite infanticide

The motif of a mother with a dead child, particularly in the horrific images of the Massacre of the Innocents in Bethlehem, is taken up repeatedly in the novel. In the discussion of the painting Guernica, it forms an iconographic transition to the painting of the Minotauromachy. The painting by Reni serves as an example here, as do the works of art by Breughel and the sculptural group by Gaudí mentioned earlier.

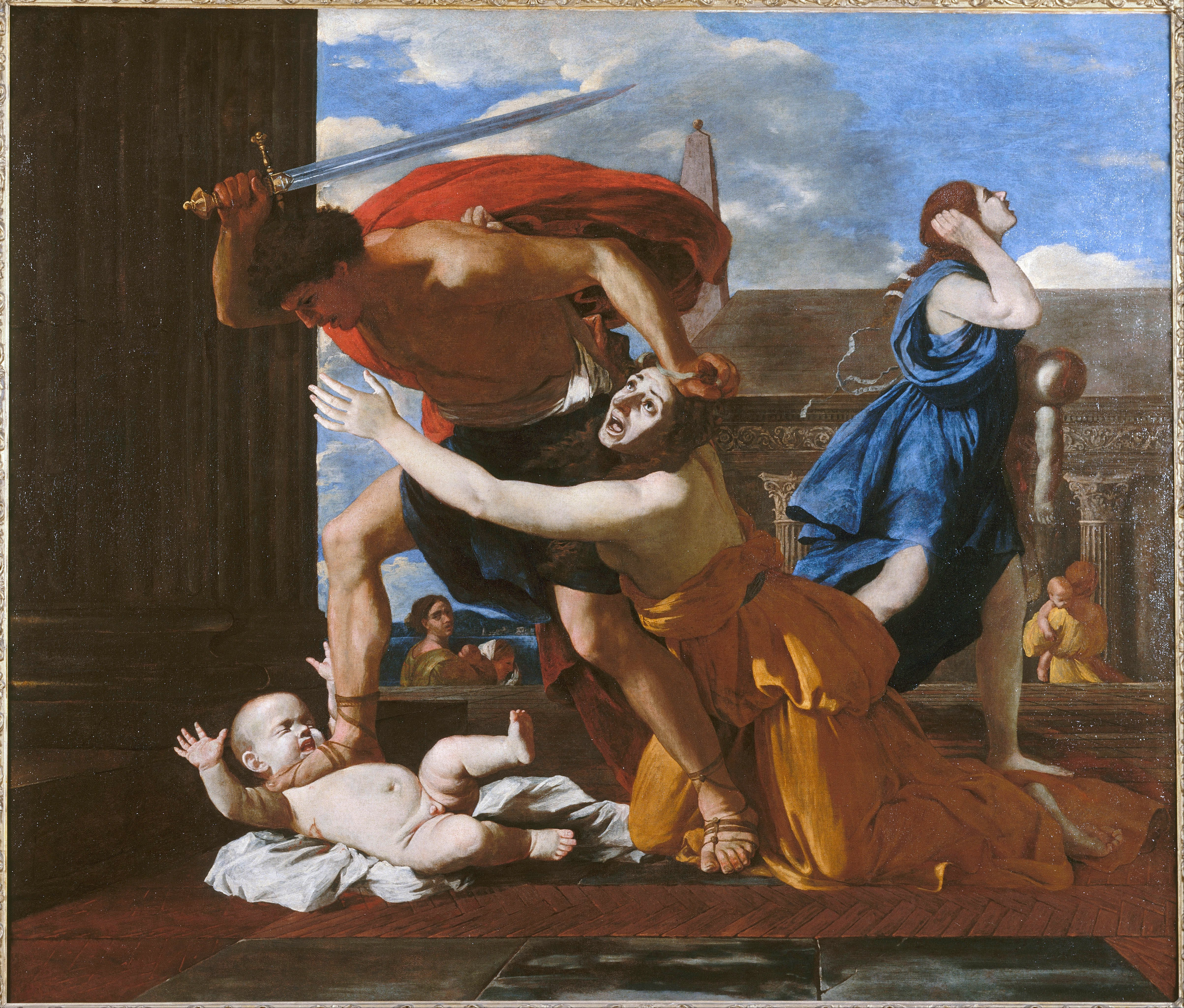

Nicolas Poussin
Massacre of the Innocents, 1625–1629

Musée Condé, Chantilly

Visual arts

- AedW I, p. 335
- Motif group: Bethlehemite infanticide
The motif of a mother with a dead child, particularly in the horrific images of the Massacre of the Innocents in Bethlehem, is taken up repeatedly in the novel. In the discussion of the painting Guernica, it forms an iconographic transition to the painting of the Minotauromachy. The painting by Reni serves as an example here, as do the works of art by Breughel and the sculptural group by Gaudí mentioned earlier.

Fernand Léger
Nudes in the forest, 1909–1911

Otterlo, Rijksmuseum Kroller-Muller

Fine arts

- AedW I, p. 336
Inclusion in the interpretation of the painting Guernica, especially the formal language forces the viewer to build and combine. The gaze is awakened.

Lyonel Feininger
The Cathedral of Socialism, 1919

Etching

Fine Art

- AedW I, p. 336
Not explicitly mentioned in the description of Picasso's Guernica, yet listed as an example of how our gaze is awakened:

"Thus the vanishing lines of the contours on Feininger's houses opened up an entire city".

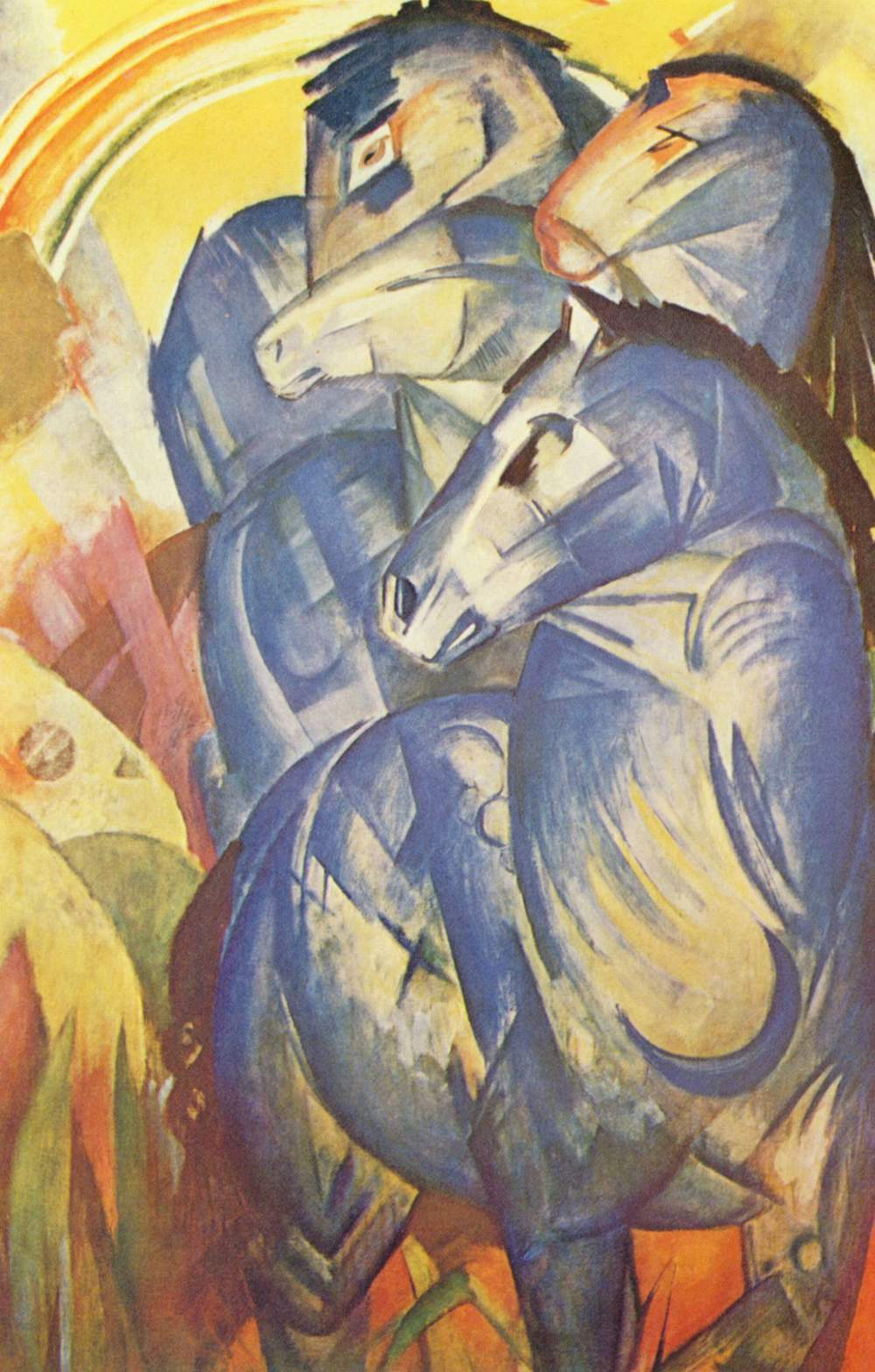

Franz Marc
Tower of the Blue Horses, 1913

formerly Berlin, Kronprinzenpalast; lost since 1945

Fine arts

- AedW I, p. 336
Listed comparatively in the description of Picasso's Guernica as an example of how our gaze is awakened, "The meteoric spraying of forms at the Tower of the Blue Horses allowed a vitality to appear that conventional means of depiction could never achieve.

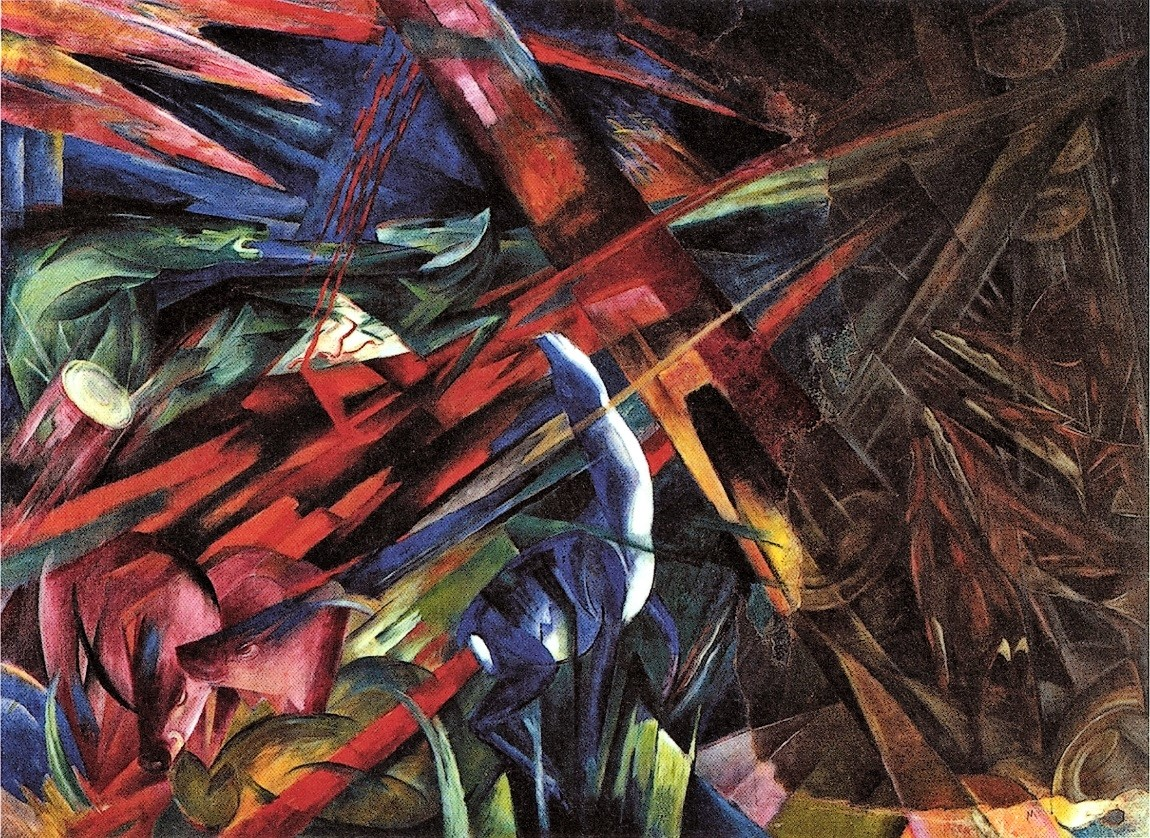

Franz Marc
Fate of the Animals, 1913

Basel, Art Museum

Fine Art

- AedW I, p. 336
The "meteoric spraying forms" attributed to the Tower of Blue Horses in the novel, as well as the reference to Picasso's painting, apply increasingly to the fates of animals.

Pablo Picasso
Minotauromachy, 1935, Etching

Fine arts

- AedW I, p. 336
Inclusion of the etching in the interpretation of the painting Guernica, the motif world of the minotauromachy stands here for the personal-sexual reference in contrast to the representation in the painting with the public-political background. However, it is recognised as "the well from which the Guernica image had risen".

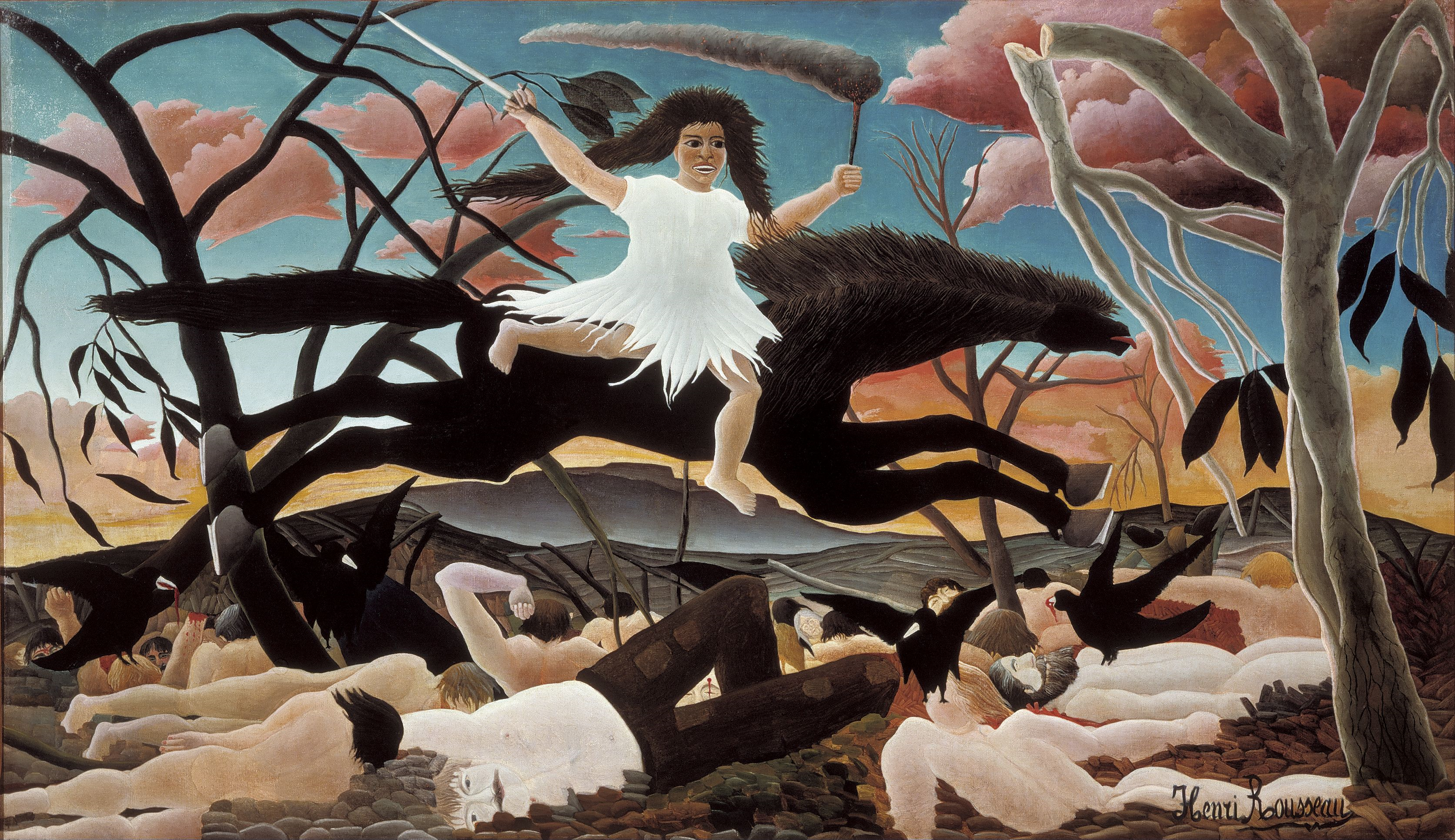

Henri Rousseau
The War - Ride of Discord, 1894

Paris, Musée d'Orsay

Fine arts

- AedW I, p. 340
- Motif group: War
Inclusion in the interpretation of the painting Guernica:

"The painting screamed and recalled all the past stages of oppression. It was close to another visualisation, in the centre of which flew a long black horse, with a rider in a torn flowing dress, carrying a sword and torch, and underneath, broken, lay the naked fallen.

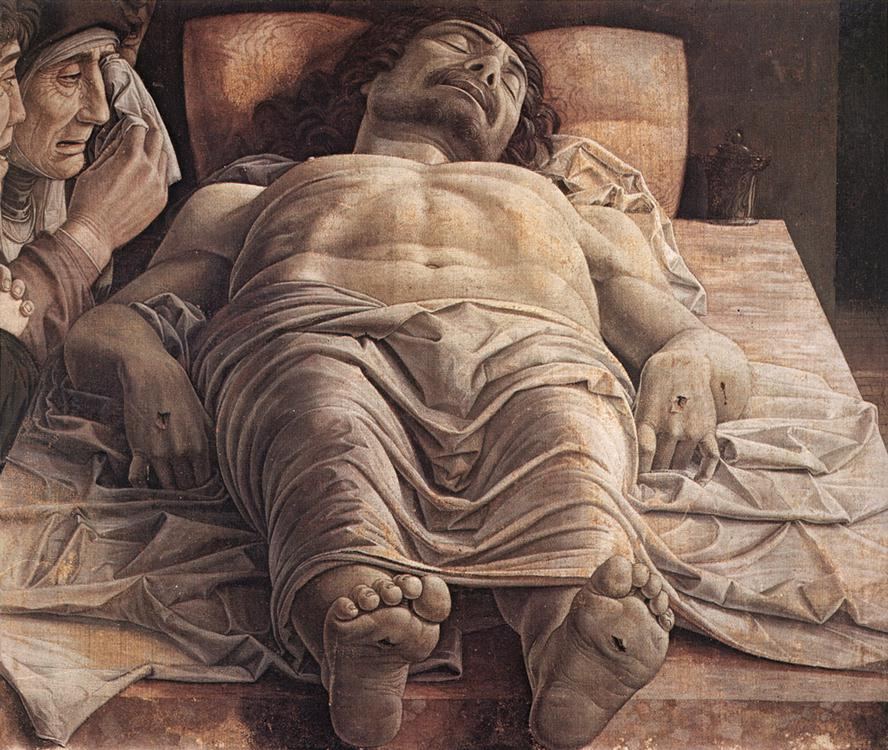

Andrea Mantegna
The lamentation of Christ, circa 1470 to circa 1474

Fine arts

- AedW I, p. 341
Naming the root of Picasso's Guernica in the motif of the Lamentation of Christ:

"Picasso's work led back as far as the Pietà of Mantegna and the Master of Avignon, to the Apocalypse of Beatus of Libana and the cave drawings of the Stone Age".

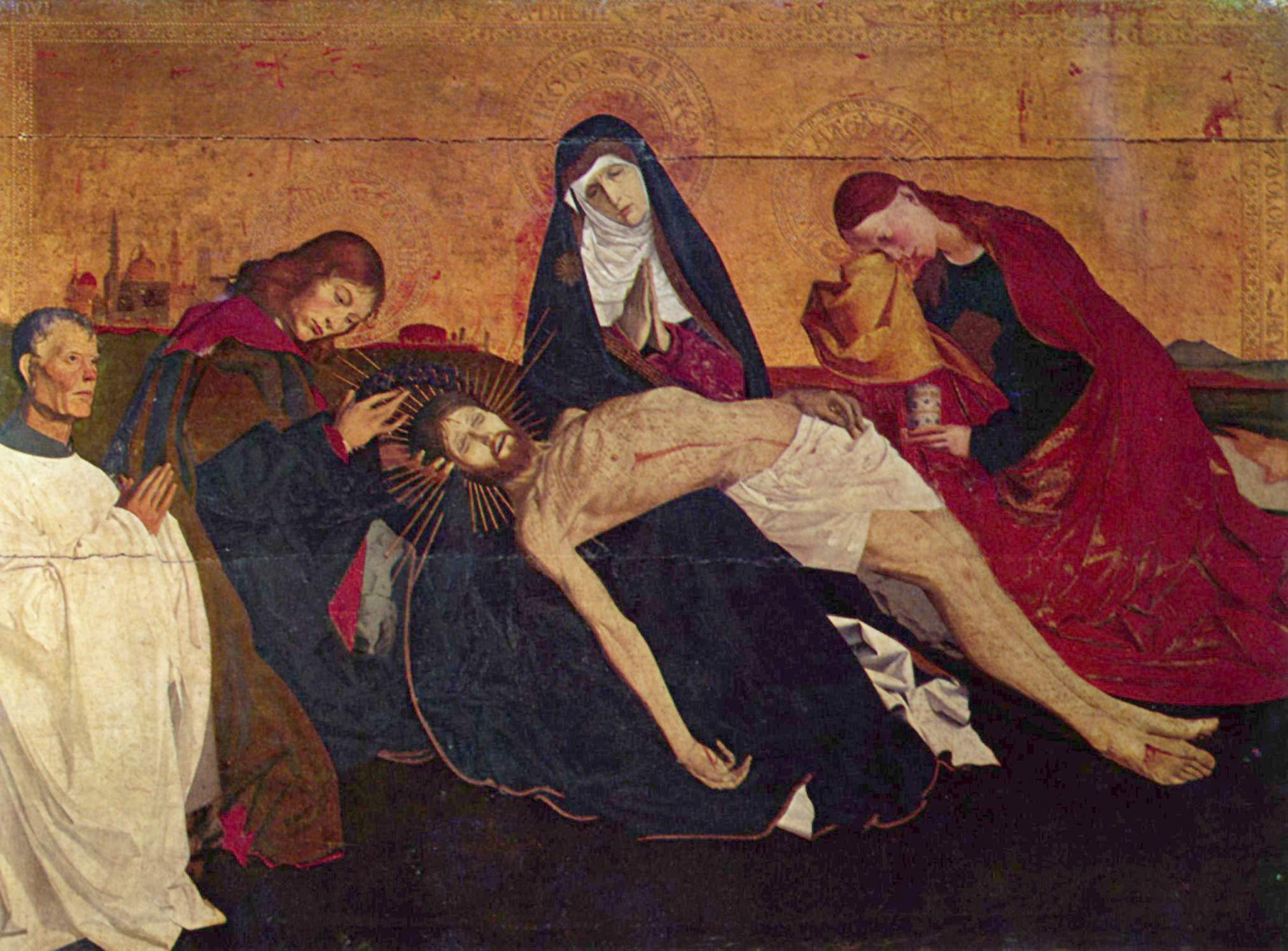

Enguerrand Quarton

(Meister des Pietà von Avignon)

Pietà of Villeneuve-lès-Avignon, c. 1455

Louvre, Paris

Fine arts

- AedW I, p. 341
Naming the root of Picasso's Guernica in the motif of the Lamentation of Christ:

"Picasso's work led back as far as the Pietà of Mantegna and the Master of Avignon, to the Apocalypse of Beatus of Libana and the cave drawings of the Stone Age".

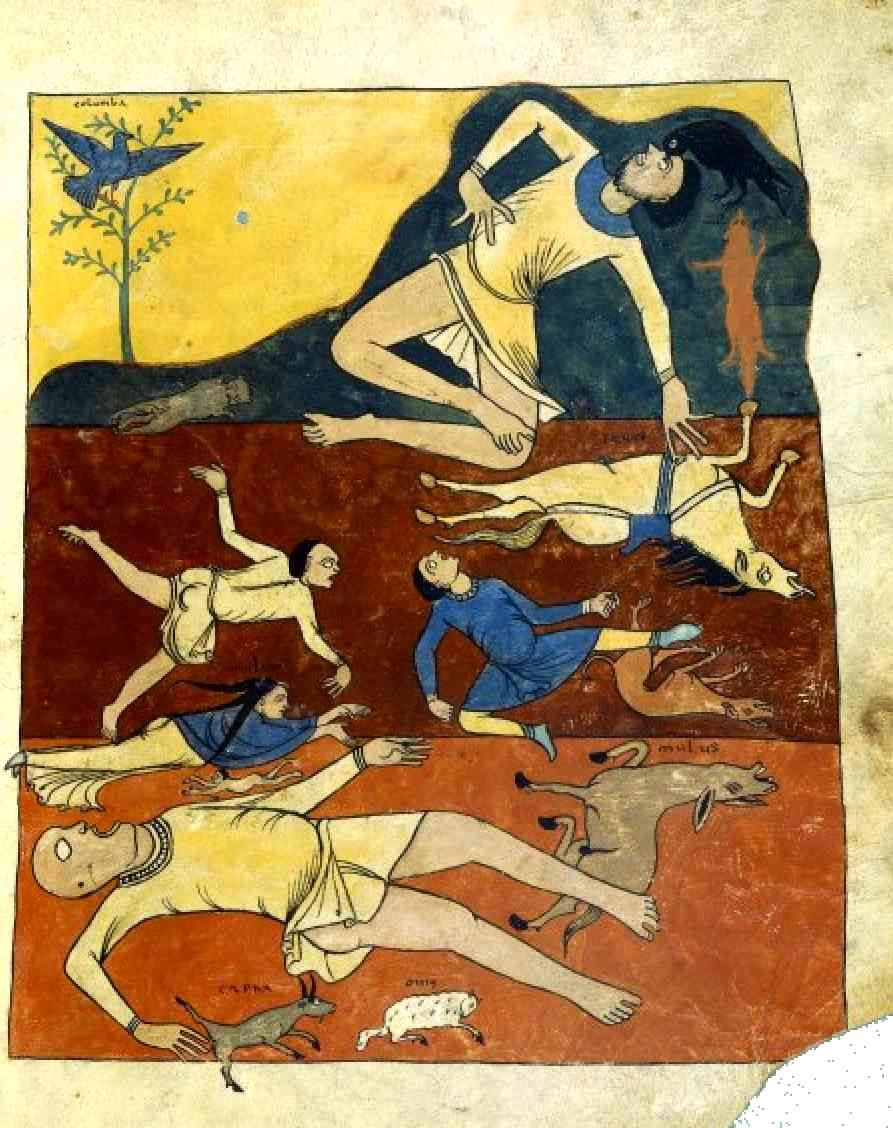

Beatus of Liébana
Saint-Sever Beatus, Mid-11th century

book illumination

Fine arts

- AedW I, p. 341
- Motif group: Images of horror
Description of the apocalypse depicted here as one of the roots of Picasso's Guernica:

"The miniature of Beatus, from the eleventh century, featured the components of composition used by Picasso in a still undisguised landscape.

Eugène Delacroix
Liberty Leading the People, 1830

Louvre, Paris

Fine Art The painting is an allegorical representation of the July Revolution of 1830, which finally overthrew the Bourbon regime in France and brought the bourgeoisie to power.

- AedW I, pp. 341–344, 347-349
- AedW II, pp. 19, 27, 40
- Motif group: Resistance / Uprising
Description and interpretation of the painting, iconographic classification and comparison with Picasso's Guernica and Géricault's Raft of the Medusa. The protagonists see the terrible thing in the painting in knowing what followed July 1830:

"The people, gathered under the ideal of freedom, were already deceived, the craft of insurrection had executed it as four decades before, with its sacrifices it had paved the way for higher classes."

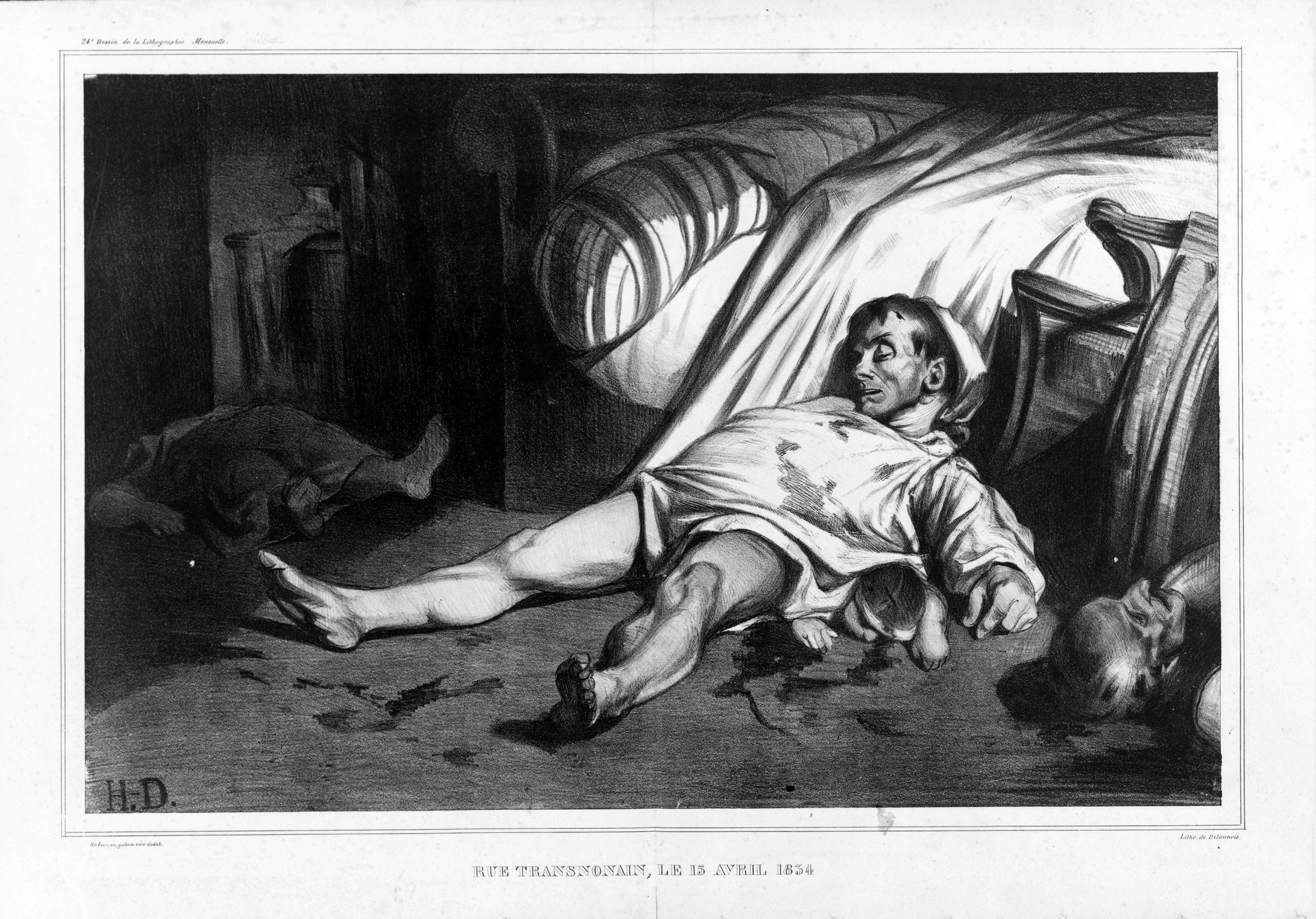

Honoré Daumier
Rue Transnonain, 15 April 1834

Fine art This print also depicts a scene from the July Revolution of 1830.

- AedW I, p. 343
- AedW II, p. 33
- Motif group: Resistance / Uprising
Discussed as a counterpart to Delacroix's Liberty Leads the People and as influenced by Géricault's Raft of the Medusa.

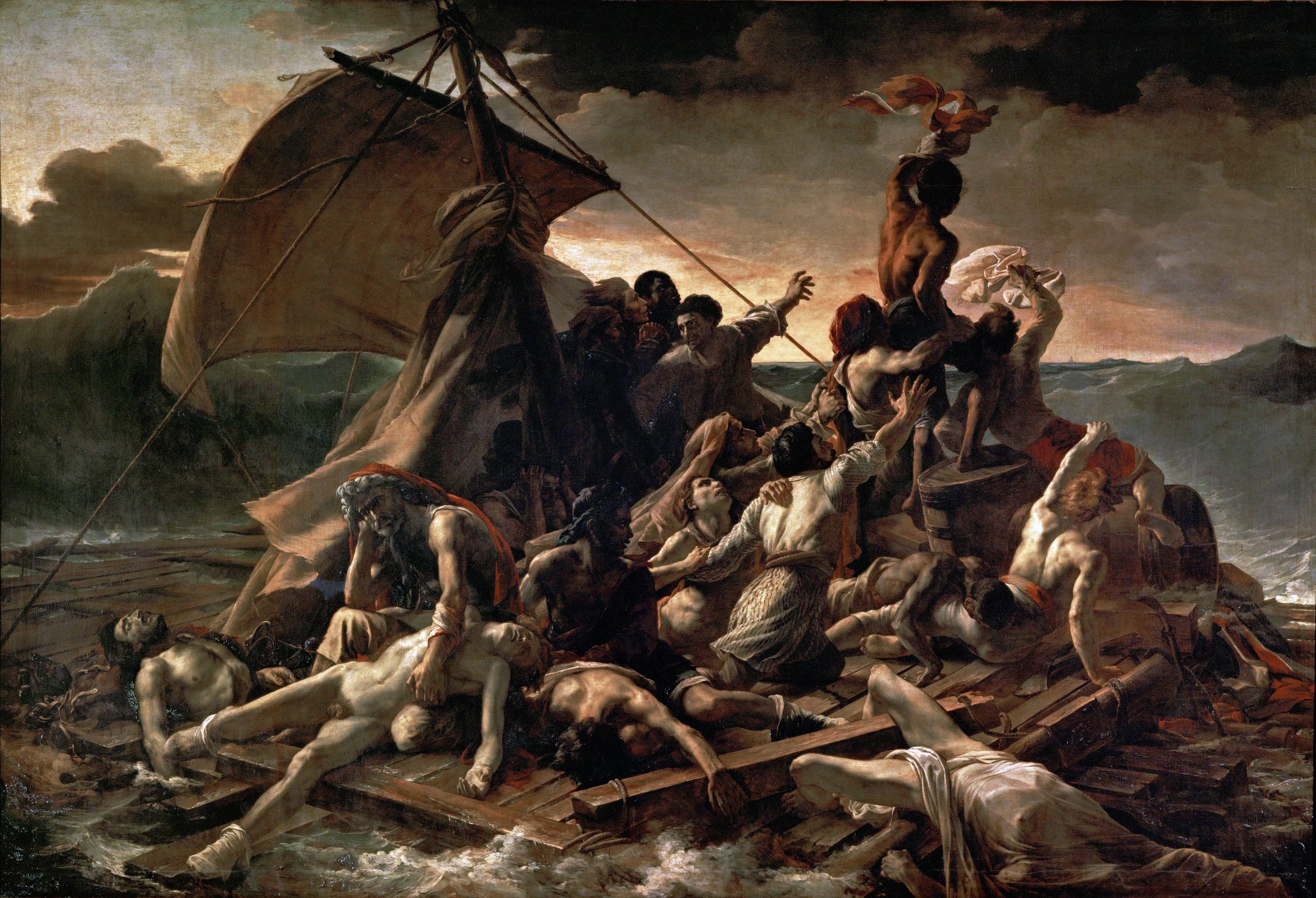

Théodore Géricault
The Raft of the Medusa, 1818–19

Louvre, Paris

Fine Arts The painting relates to the events surrounding the French frigate Méduse, which ran aground on the West African coast in June 1816. A makeshift raft was constructed for 147 passengers and crew members, which drifted in the open sea for over ten days, insufficiently equipped with water and food. Only 15 people survived. The disaster attracted attention throughout Europe and led to a government scandal due to the poorly executed rescue operation.

- AedW I, pp. 343–345, 347-350
- AedW II, pp. 7–19, 21-23, 26-33, 41, 66f., 119f., 122f.
- Motif group: Images of horror
Intensive examination, description and interpretation as well as illumination of the background of the painting. It is set in relation to Picasso's Guernica as a depiction of terror and compared to Delacroix's The Liberty Leads the People in historical representation. "Géricault's painting, however, had been a dangerous attack on established society."

The biography of the artist and the political background of the Méduse affair are also discussed, as are the personal accounts of survivors. In the second volume of the novel, Peter Weiss revisits the artist and his work and describes the creative process with a multitude of studies and drafts. From the initially political reading of the painting, various narrative levels, some of which overlap, are directed to a personal level of experience; the political catastrophe turns into a personal-existential crisis.

Francisco de Goya
The Third of May, 1814

Madrid, Museo del Prado

Fine arts On 2 May 1808, there was a popular uprising in Napoleonic-occupied Spain. 45 insurgents were rounded up and shot on the hill of Principe Pio during the night of 2 to 3 May.

- AedW I, pp. 313, 340, 345-350
- AedW II, pp. 153, 155, 299
- Motif group: Resistance / Uprising
- Motif group: Images of horror
Discussion and interpretation of the painting, initially set in relation to Picasso's Guernica and compared with Géricault's Raft of the Medusa, the painting is taken up many times in later chapters. In describing and interpreting the painting, the protagonists engage in an argument about martyr-like death:

"Does he not express (...) all that can be achieved in this span between birth and death, is his gesture not full of pride and superiority, as he lets go of everything and offers his whole body to the end, certain that he has not lived uselessly."

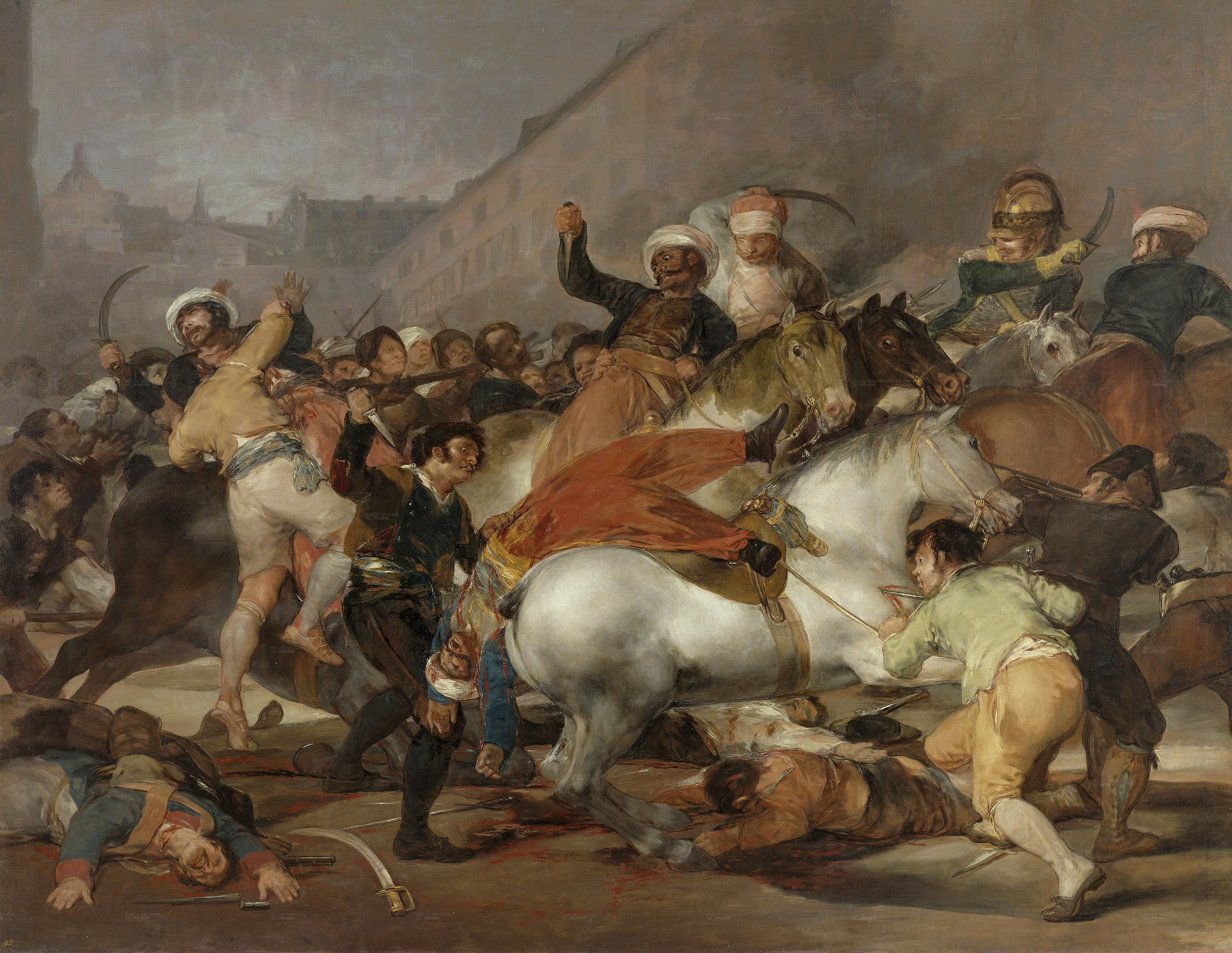

Francisco de Goya
The Second of May 1808, 1814

Madrid, Museo del Prado

Fine arts On 2 May 1808, there was a popular uprising in Spain occupied by Napoleonic troops.

- AedW I, p. 345
- Motif group: Resistance / Uprising
This painting, which is not explicitly mentioned in the novel, forms the counterpart to the shooting of the insurgents and depicts the events that preceded the executions, the struggle of the people of Madrid against the Napoleonic troops. Both paintings were intended by Goya as an ensemble, the concrete historical statement is seen as a testimonial impulse, which is also inherent in Peter Weiss' novel itself.

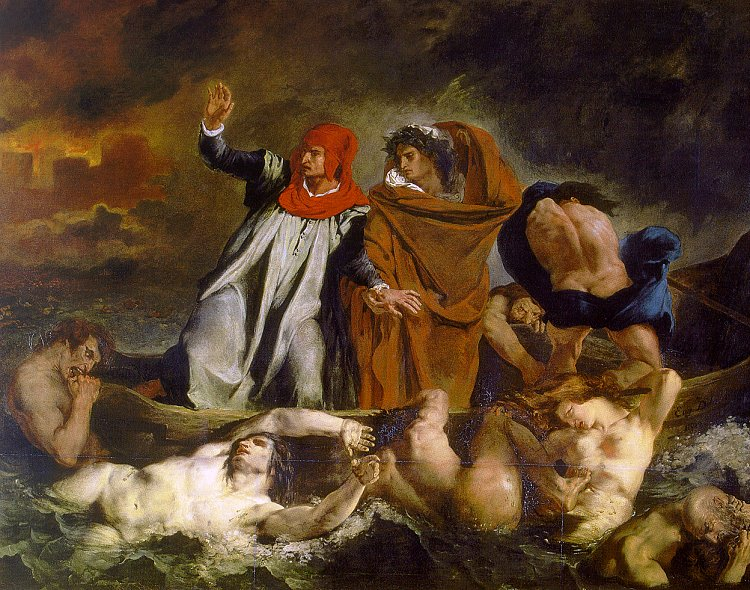

Eugène Delacroix
The Barque of Dante, 1822

Louvre, Paris

Visual arts The painting depicts the eighth canto of Hell from the Divina Commedia, depicting Dante and Virgil crossing the River of the Damned in the narrow yacht of the ferryman Phlegyas.

- AedW I, p. 347
In Delacroix's interpretation of The Liberty, the people list it as a comparison to previously created paintings:

"Hitherto he had set his dissolute fantasies in infernal journeys and slaughter".

The mention of this painting simultaneously contains a recourse to the discussion of Dante's Divine Comedy.

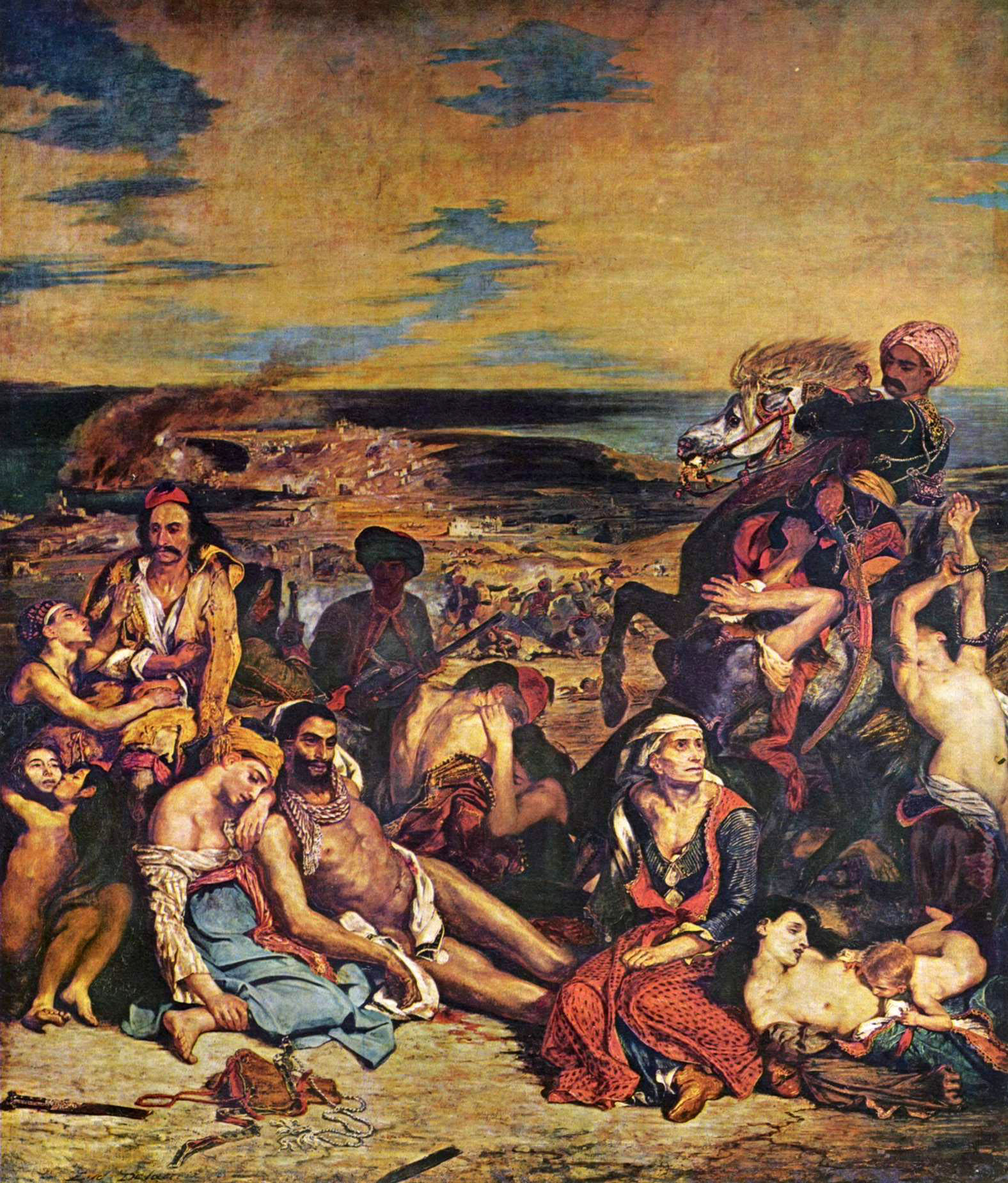

Eugène Delacroix
Chios massacre, 1824

Louvre, Paris

Fine art The painting depicts the Chios massacre perpetrated by the Ottomans during the Greek Revolution in April 1822.

- AedW I, p. 347
- Motif group: Images of horror
The painting is placed in relation to Picasso's Guernica, moreover, in Delacroix's interpretation The Liberty Leads the People is listed as a comparison to previously created paintings:

"Hitherto he had set his dissolute fantasies in infernal journeys and slaughter".

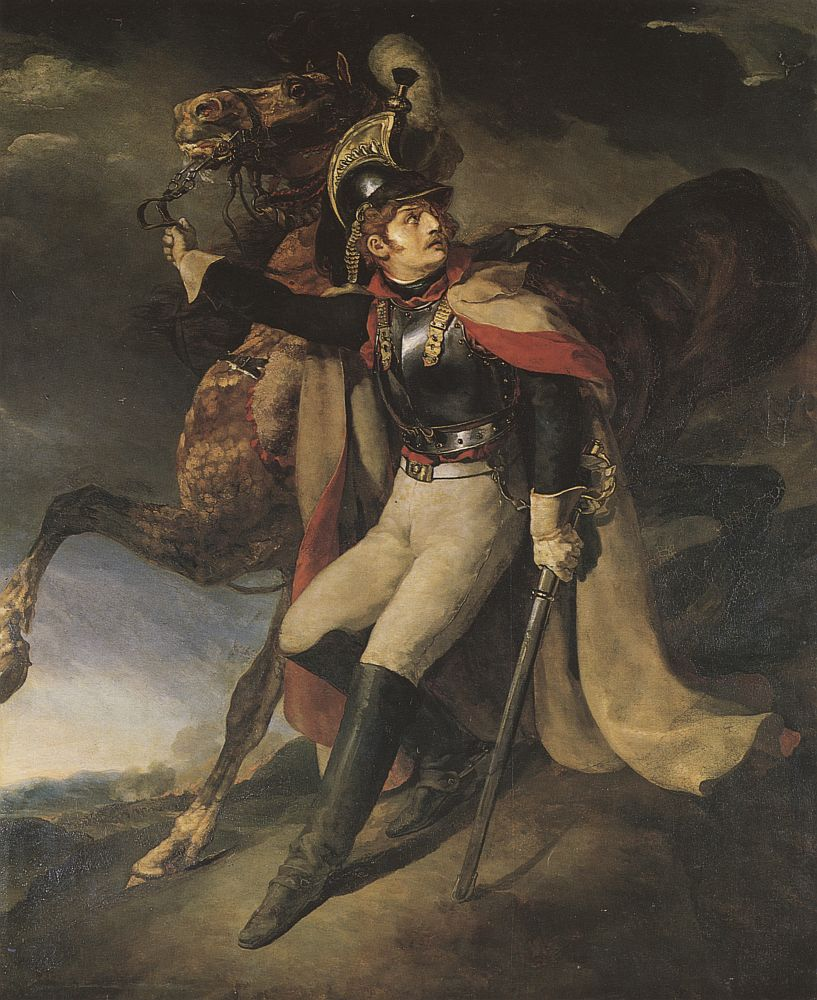

Théodore Géricault
Wounded Cuirassier Leaving the Field of Battle, 1814

Louvre, Paris

Fine arts

- AedW I, p. 347
Example of Géricault's paintings before the Raft of the Medusa:

"Similarly, Géricault's vision emerged from a harried, disturbed life in which unruliness, the constant flight from oneself, initially found expression in the military campaigns and the collapse of the Napoleonic empire (...)."

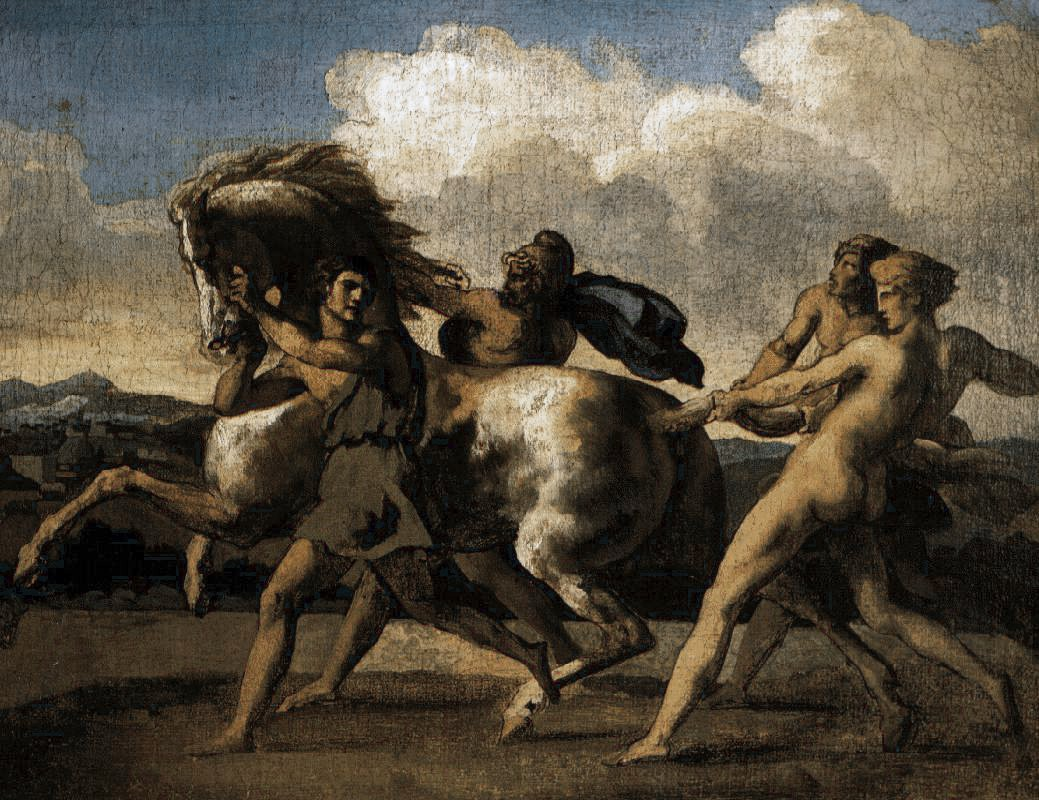

Théodore Géricault
Horse Stopped by Four Young People, 1817

Rouen, Musée des Beaux-Arts de Rouen

Fine arts

- AedW I, p. 347
Example of Géricault's paintings before the Raft of the Medusa:

"Similarly, Géricault's vision emerged from a harried, disturbed life in which unruliness, the constant flight from oneself, initially found expression (...) in broadly and violently painted martial scenes.

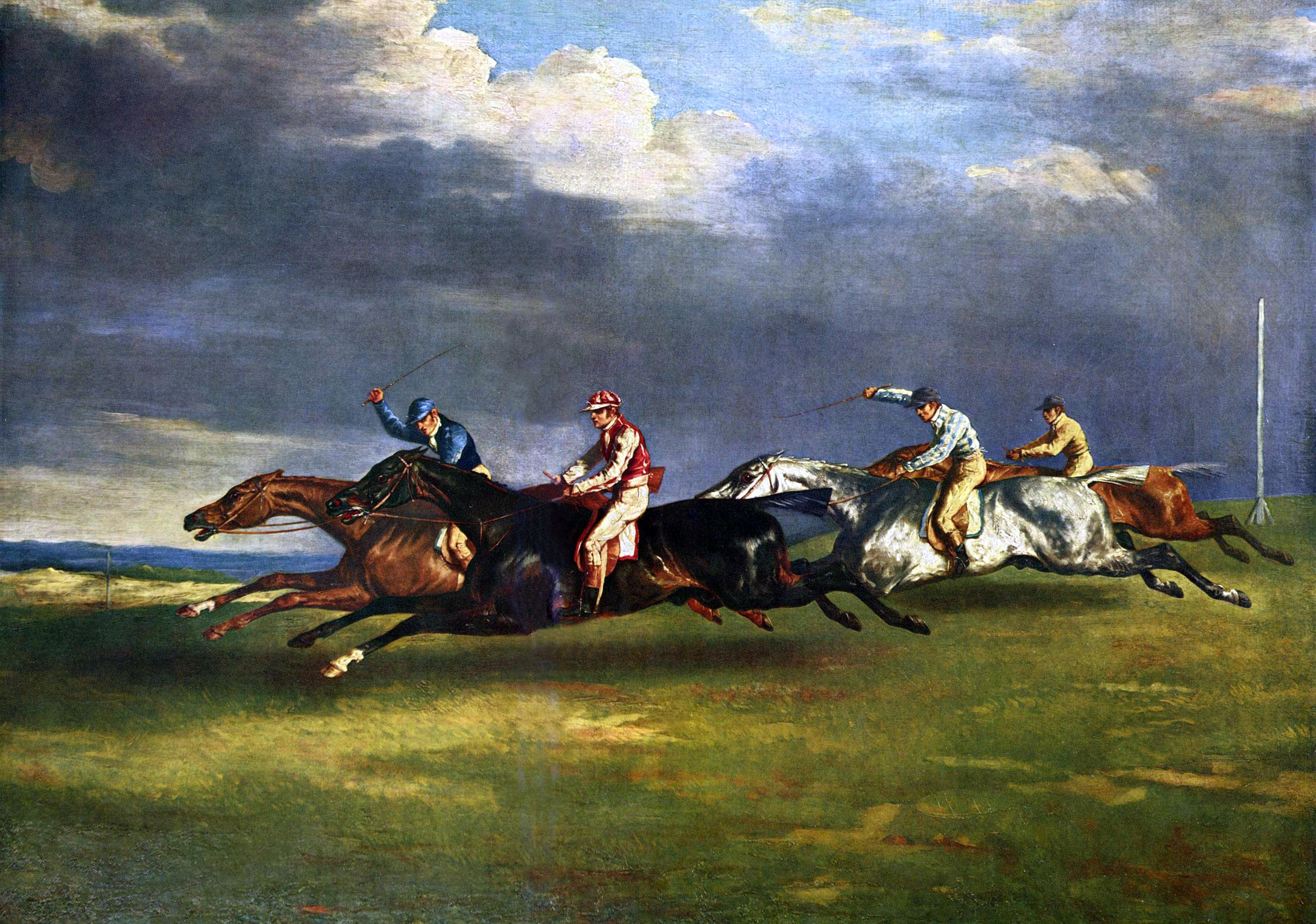

Théodore Géricault
The 1821 Derby at Epsom, 1821

Louvre, Paris

Fine arts

- AedW I, pp. 347, 349
Example of Théodore Géricault's personal background:

"Likewise, Géricault's vision emerged from a harried, disturbed life, in which the unruliness, the constant flight from oneself (...) then later in wildly chasing horses." At the same time, the first-person narrator notes that the painter painted the dream of his death in this picture.

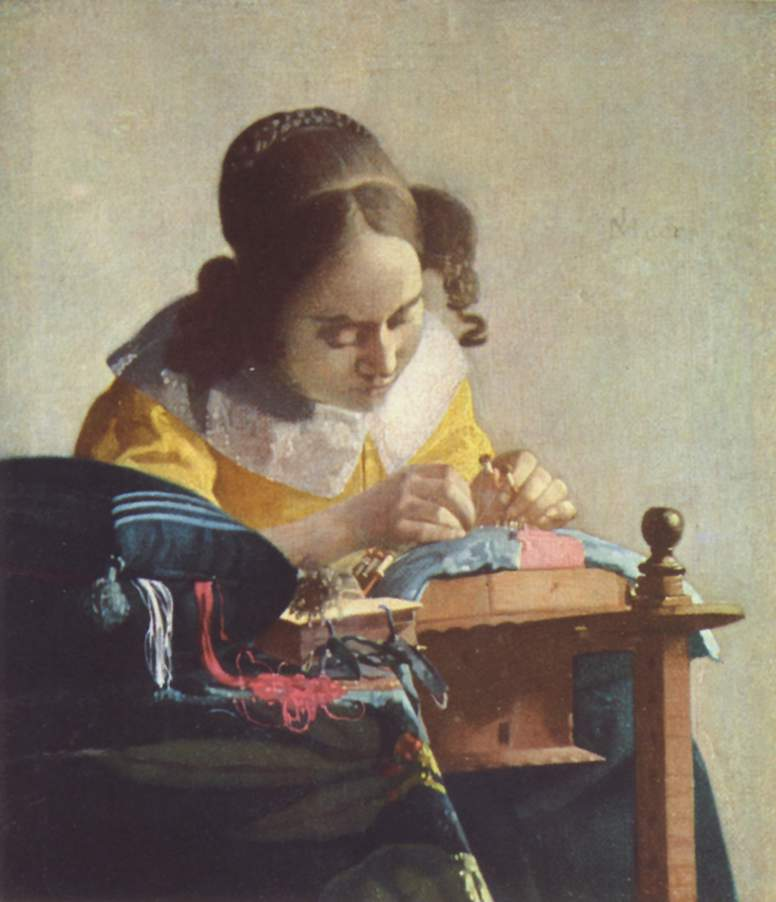

Jan Vermeer
The Lacemaker, c. 1665

Louvre, Paris

Fine arts

- AedW I, p. 353
Resumption of the theme of work in the performing arts with the idea

"that only the artistic depiction of a seamstress, a lace-maker, a mower or thresher, a maid harvesting grapes or a blacksmith gives our work a value. Only in the work of art would labour have cultural significance, there it had become art".

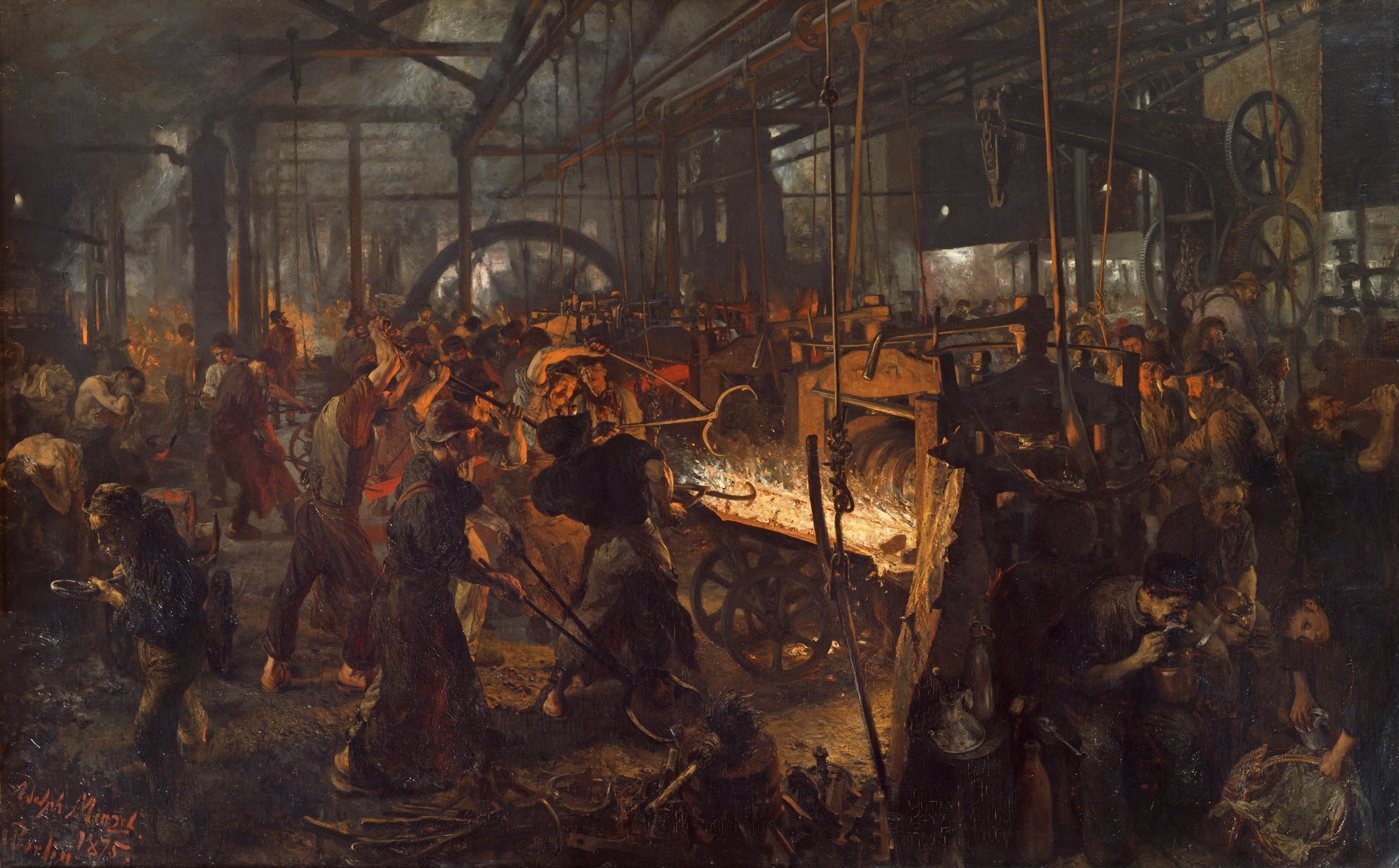

Adolph Menzel
The Rolling Mill, 1875

Berlin, Old National Gallery

Fine Arts

- AedW I, pp. 353–358
- Motif group: Work
Description and interpretation of the painting in the context first of all of the first-person narrator's thoughts on the culture of the workers and the fascination that this representation exudes. With further contemplation, he develops a critique of the painting's entrenchment of conditions:

"the men, with their furrowed faces and their bodies clenched in front of the embers, their fists clenched around their tools, had nevertheless been detached from social knowledge, documentation and organisations (... I saw) whom Menzel's mastery had placed before an admiring public, the German working man from Bismarck's and Wilhelm's empires, unchallenged by the Communist Manifesto, in his sole authority to be valiant and faithful."

Rather, the painting symbolises the expansion of industrial imperialism; Peter Weiss relates it to two other paintings by Menzel to form a triptych of recent German history: in the Nationalgalerie exhibition, it is flanked by the paintings King Wilhelm's Departure for the Army in 1870 and Das Ballsouper.

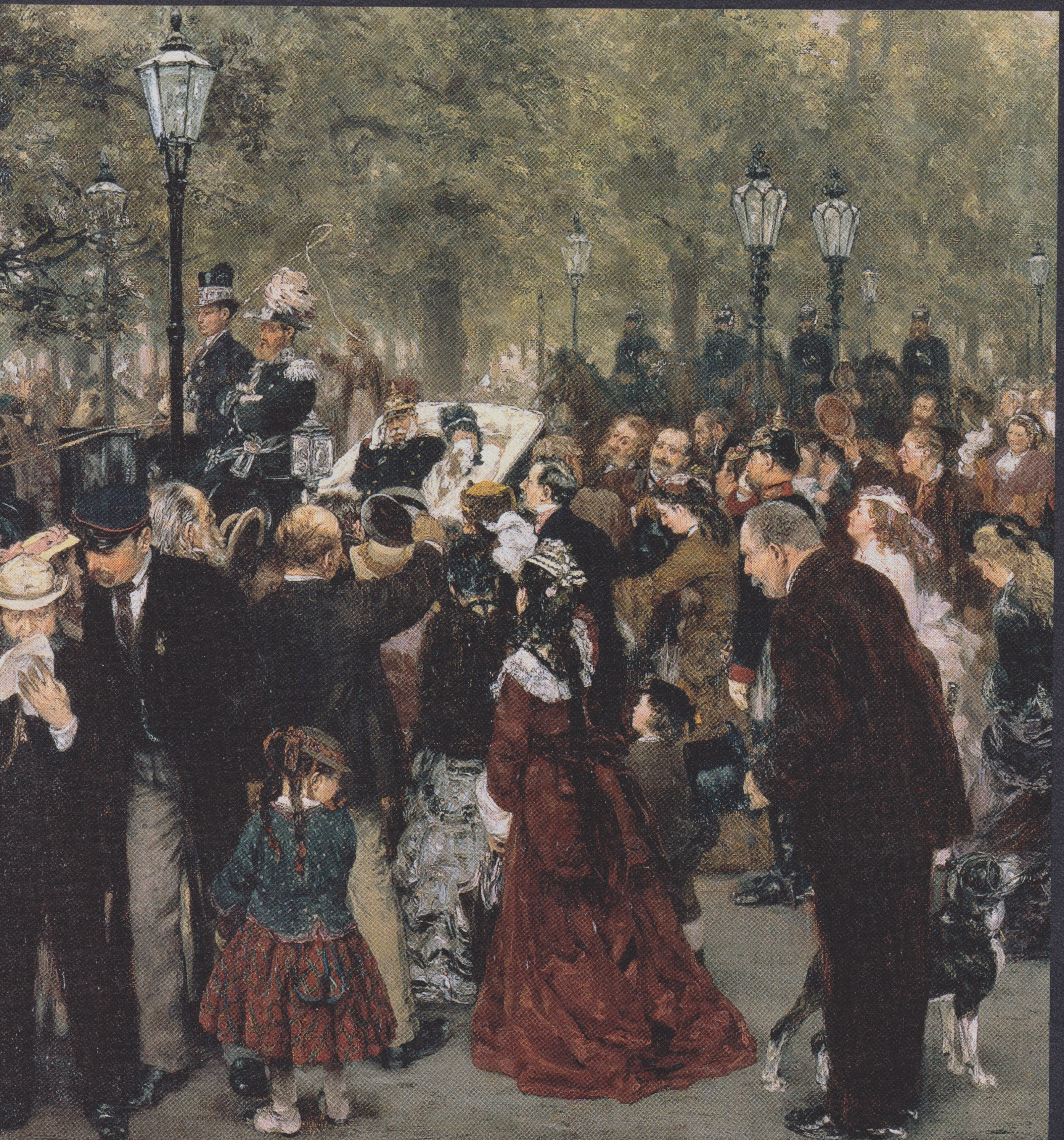

Adolph Menzel
Departure of King Wilhelm I. to the Army on 31 July 1870, 1871

Berlin, Old National Gallery

Fine Art The painting represents the prelude to the Franco-Prussian War of 1870.

- AedW I, p. 355 f.
Left part of the triptych on German history that the first-person narrator recognises in the arrangement of Menzel's three paintings in the National Gallery, it represents the prelude to the Franco-Prussian War of 1870:

"On the left, the event of which it was said that the heartbeat of the nation was expressed in it."

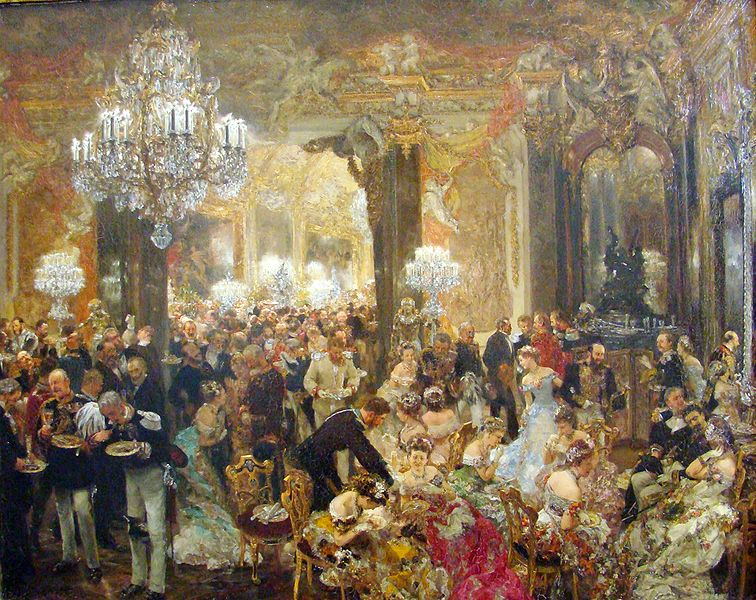

Adolph Menzel
The Dinner at the Ball, 1878

Berlin, Old National Gallery

Fine Art

- AedW I, p. 355 f.
Right part of the triptych on German history that the first-person narrator recognises in the arrangement of Menzel's three paintings in the National Gallery:

"On the one side, the enthusiastic welcome of war, the education to kowtow, to lick one's lips; on the other, the glorification of pompous splendour. In the middle, the hardest toil to create wealth for those on the right and left. (...) The central piece with the men in leather aprons, wielding heavy poles and tongs, showed all the fraud perpetrated on the working class."

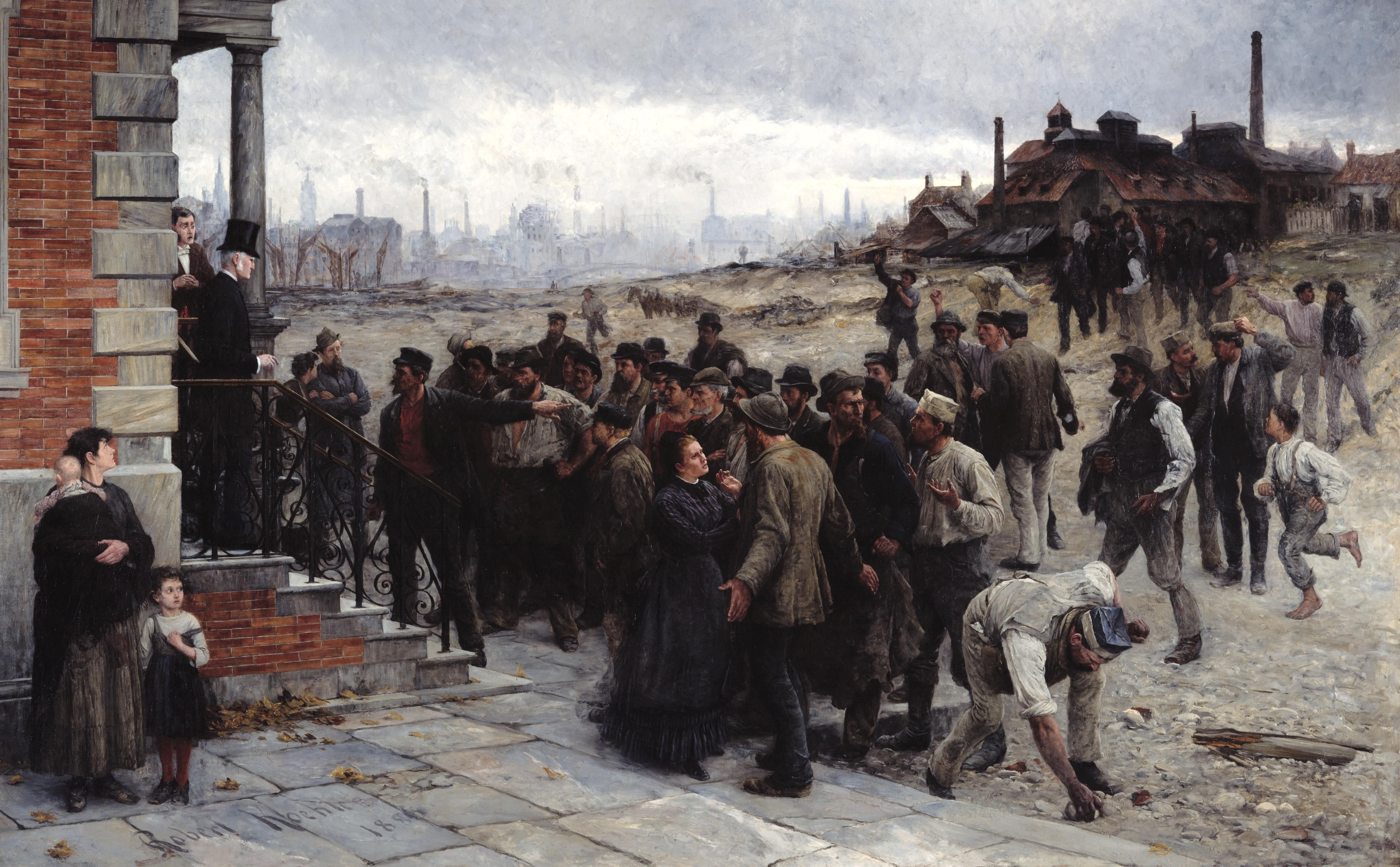

Robert Koehler
The Strike in the region of Charleroi, 1886

Berlin, Deutsches Historisches Museum

Fine arts

- AedW I, pp. 357–359
- Motif group: Labour
- Motif group: Resistance / Revolt
Description and discussion of the painting as a counterpart to Menzel's Iron Rolling Mill, which depicts the workers as acting subjects.

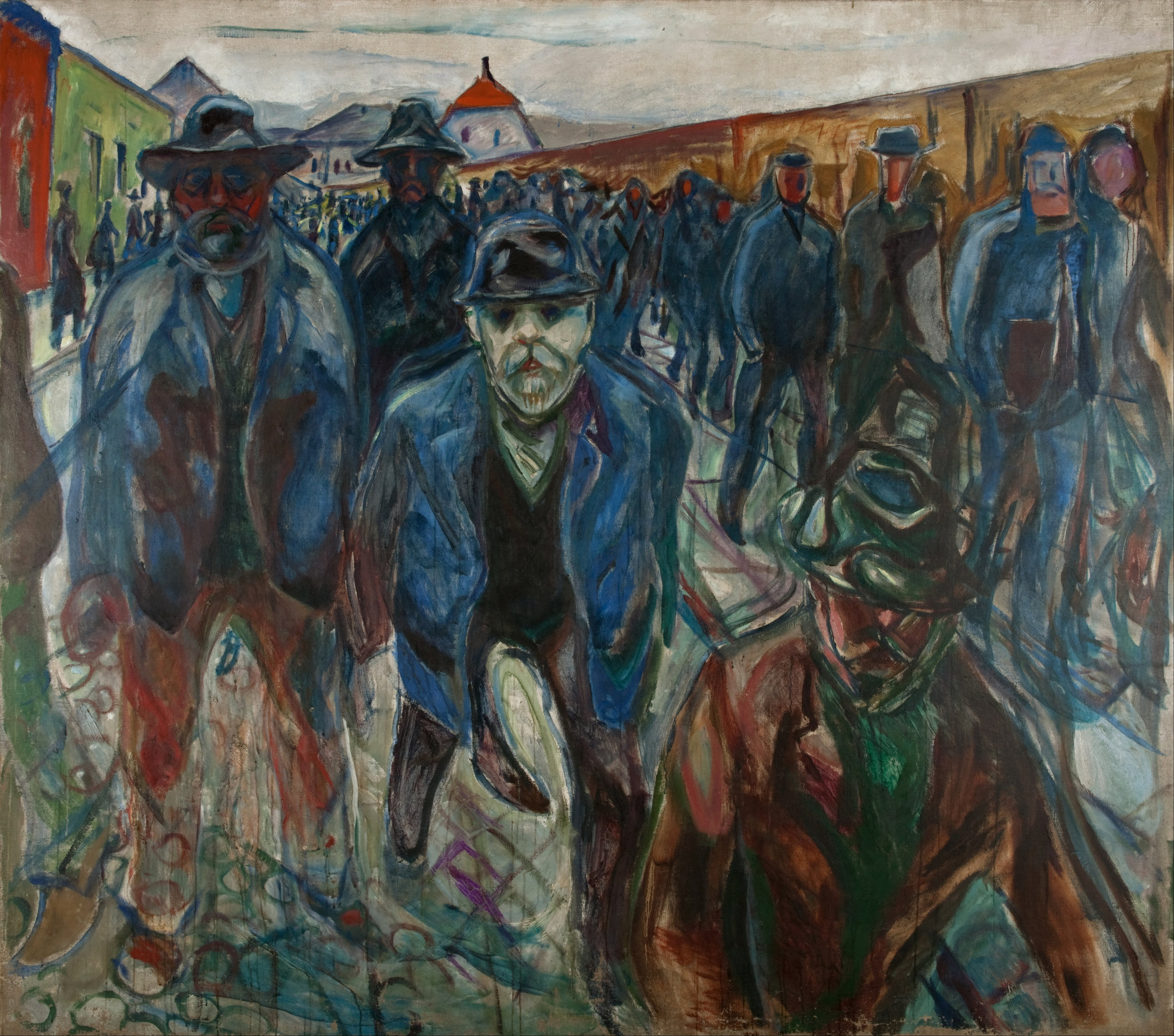

Edvard Munch
Workers on their Way Home, c. 1914

Copenhagen, Statens Museum for Kunst

Fine arts

- AedW I, p. 360
- Motif group: Work
Described and presented as an allegory of a way of life,

"because it contained everything I had experienced in my own body, the weary trudge to the factory in the morning, the extinguished retreat after the shift, the bondage to work, the hatred of this bondage and of the compulsion to take the work that offered itself, the stifled sausage of having to work for others, and the fear of losing this work."

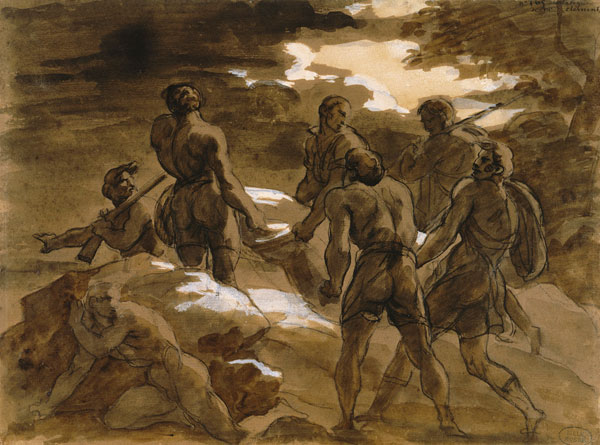

Théodore Géricault
The murderers carry the body of Fualdès to Aveyron, c. 1818

From the series The Murder of Antoine-Bernardin Fualdès, Paris, Musée des Beaux-Arts

Fine arts Series of drawings relating to the murder of the administrative official Antoine-Bernardin Fualdès in 1817, which was followed by a judicial scandal and a contemporary media spectacle in 1818.

- AedW II, p. 10
In the second volume of the novel, Peter Weiss takes up the discussion of Géricault's painting "The Raft of the Medusa" and deals intensively with the creative process. The process is introduced with a series of drawings on the murder of Antoine-Bernardin Fualdès, with which Géricault fitted a daily political event of the sensational press of the time into artistic form.

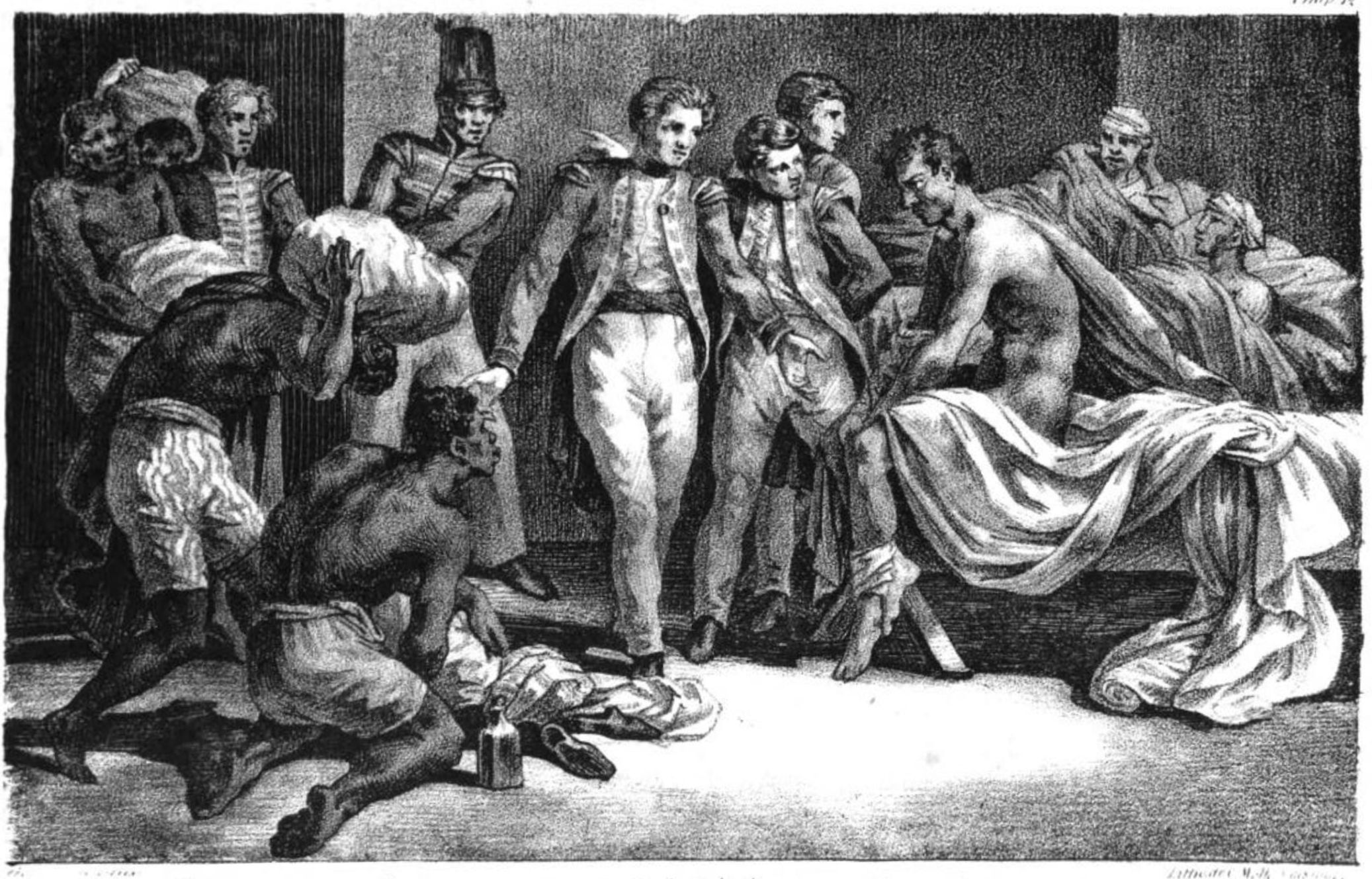

Jean-Baptiste Henri Savigny and Alexander Corréard
The Shipwreck of the Frigate Medusa, 1821

Report Paris

Literature Savigny and Corréard were survivors of the Méduse disaster who published a detailed report five years after the events.

- AedW II, pp. 9–13
The report by Savigny and Corréard is included in the creative process for Géricault's painting Raft of the Medusa. Due to the partly verbatim reproduction, the narrative levels overlap. The first-person narrator's description of the shipwreck represents Géricault's confrontation with the background.

Both the book and the painting draw the narrator into the events.

"The dismay and despair, the confusion and numbness were portrayed with such tangibility that the reader felt himself in the midst of those stranded."

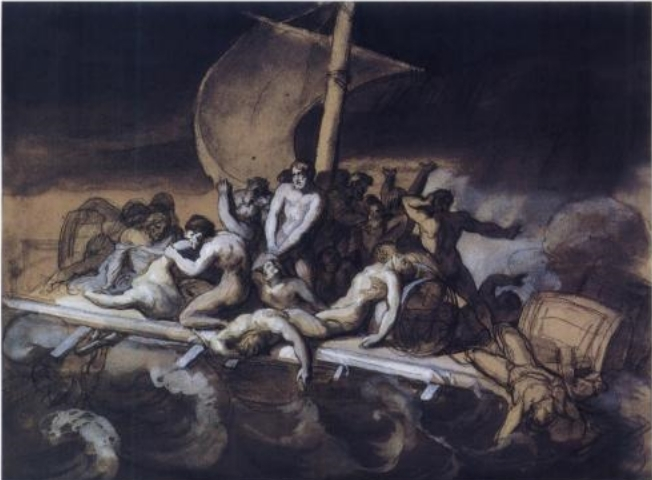

Théodore Géricault

Cannibalism on the Raft of the Medusa, 1818-1819 Louvre, Paris

Fine arts

- AedW II, p. 14ff.
Géricaults Arbeitsprozess wird anhand der fünf Kompositionsstudien besprochen, die die Themen Meuterei, Kannibalismus, Sichtung der Brigg, Begrüßung eines Rettungsboots und die Rettung bearbeiten.

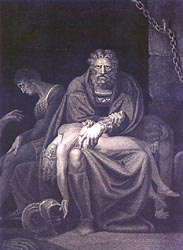

Johann Heinrich Füssli
Ugolino and his Sons Starving to Death in the Tower,1809

Steel engraving by Moses Haughton after the painting by J.H. Füssli (1806) Kunsthaus Zürich

Fine Arts Ugolino della Gherardesca (1220-1289) was a Tuscan nobleman of Sardinian origin and one of the leading politicians of the city republic of Pisa. At the instigation of his political rival, Archbishop Ruggieri, he was imprisoned in 1289 together with two sons and two grandsons in what later became known as the Tower of Hunger in Pisa and left to starve to death. Ugolino is included as a character in Dante's Divine Comedy, banished together with Ruggieri to the ice of the second ring in the ninth and deepest circle of Hell.

- AedW II, p. 16
- Divina, Canto XXXII, 124-140 and XXXIII, 1-90
The first-person narrator sees the portrayal of Count Ugolino as a model for the sketch of cannibalism on Géricault's Raft of the Medusa. The novel thus makes a further reference to Dante's Divine Comedy.

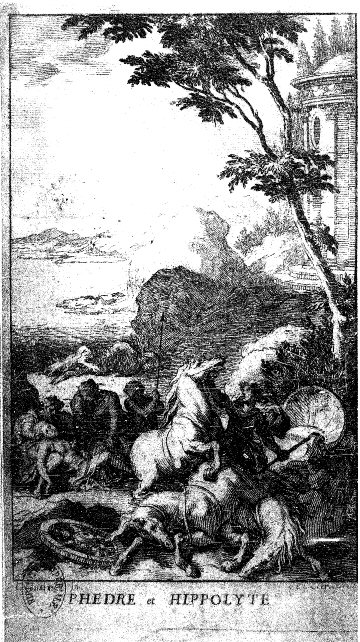

Greek Mythology
Hippolytus

Son of the hero Theseus and the Amazon queen Hippolyta

Literature Phaedra, the second wife of Theseus, is enchanted by Aphrodite so that she falls in love with her stepson Hippolytus. When he rejects her love, she commits suicide, but leaves behind the false accusation that Hippolytus has been stalking her. When Theseus finds Phaedra dead, he curses Hippolytus. He flees, but Poseidon sends a sea monster and the horses on Hippolytus' chariot shy away. He falls from the chariot, gets caught in the reins and is dragged to death.

- AedW II, p. 17 ff.
In an allegorical correspondence with the myth, Géricault's relationship with his stepmother is described and woven into the process of working on the Raft of the Medusa, which is accompanied by hallucinations.

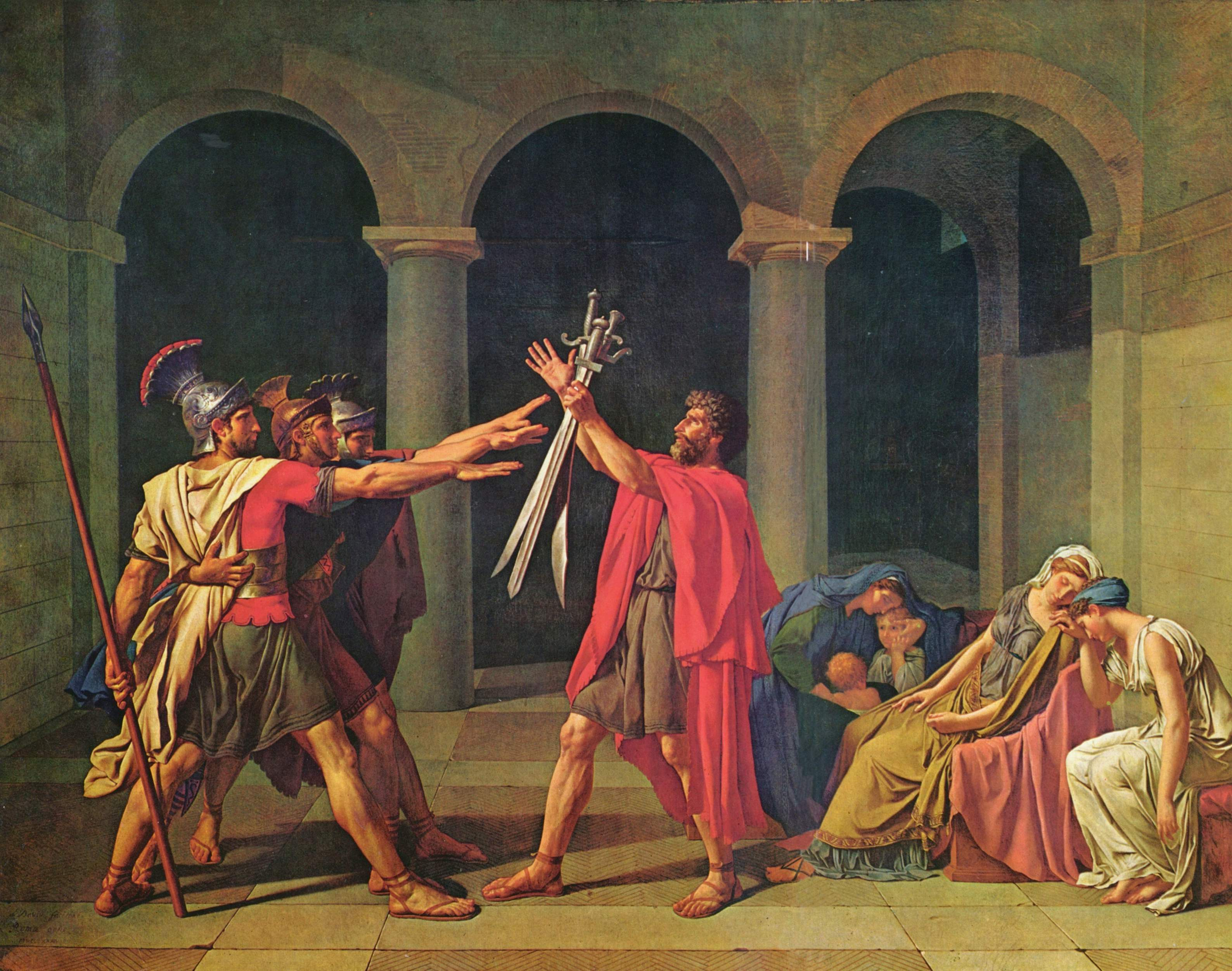

Jacques-Louis David
Oath of the Horatii, 1784

Louvre, Paris

Fine Art The painting of the Horatii, created in the pre-revolutionary crisis years, is regarded as the introduction to revolutionary classicism.

- AedW II, p. 23
In the sequence of David's pictures it becomes clear "how, after the classicist spirit of the revolution, after the idealistic flight of fancy, the approach to the megalomania of imperialism could be found immediately.

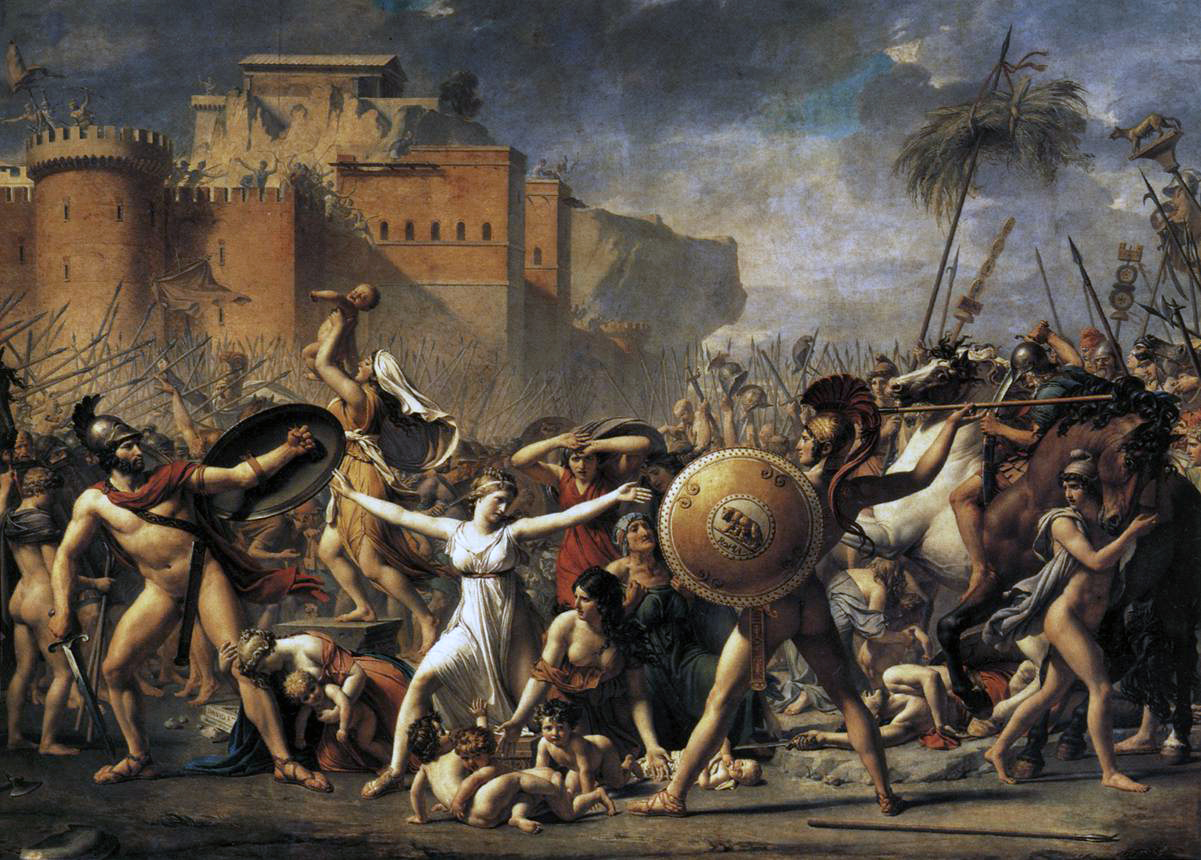

Jacques-Louis David
The Intervention of the Sabine Women,1799

Louvre, Paris

Fine arts

- AedW II, p. 23
- Motif group: War
In the sequence of David's pictures it becomes clear "how after the classicist spirit of the revolution, after the idealistic flight of fancy, the approach to the megalomania of imperialism could immediately be found."

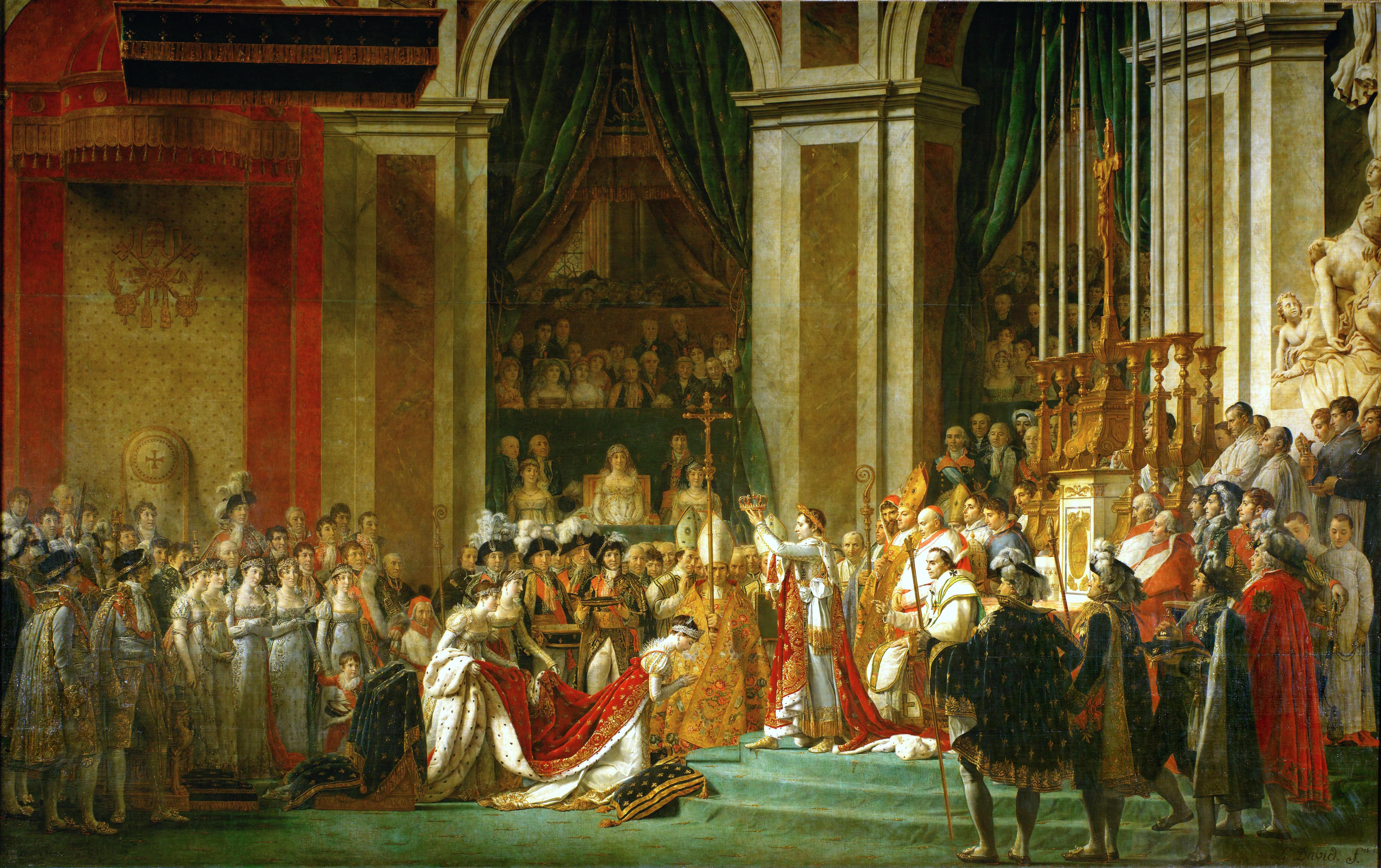

Jacques-Louis David
The Coronation of Napoleon, 1805-1807

Louvre, Paris

Fine arts

- AedW II, p. 23
In the sequence of David's pictures it becomes clear "how after the classicist spirit of the revolution, after the idealistic flight of fancy, the approach to the megalomania of imperialism could immediately be found."

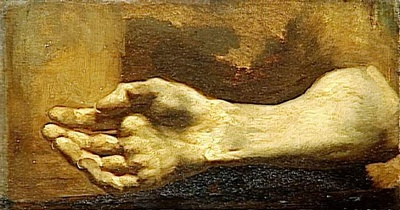

Théodore Géricault
Studies of Severed Limbs,1818

oil study Paris, Louvre

Fine arts

- AedW II, p. 23
- Motif group: Images of horror
Example of one of Géricault's numerous studies of anatomical models whose genesis was incorporated into the novel.

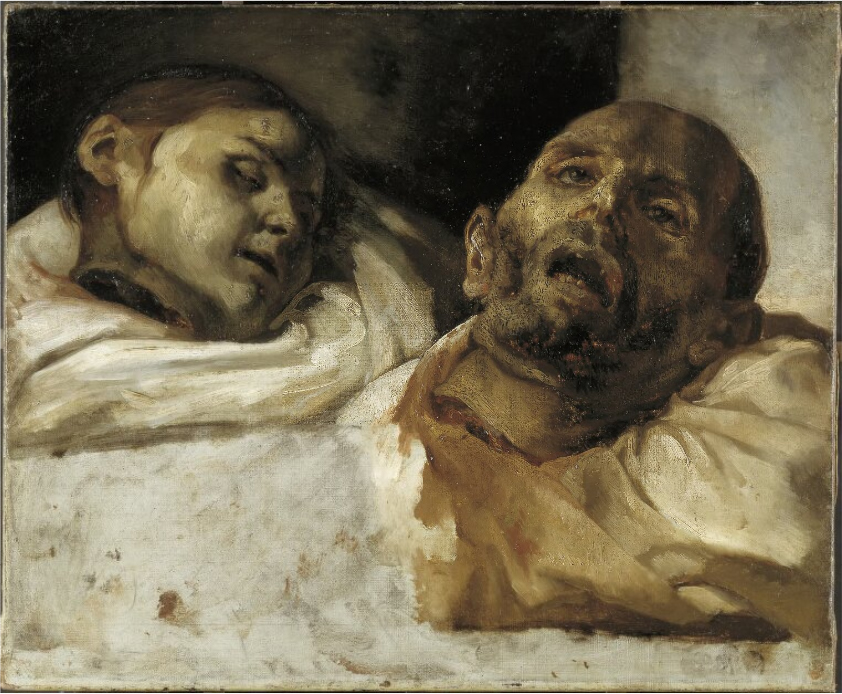

Théodore Géricault
Studies after decapitated persons,1818

Stockholm, National Museum

Fine arts

- AedW II, pp. 23, 119 f.
- Motif group: Images of horror
The painting is first used as an example for further studies by Géricault. A description of the depiction of the Guillotined follows a few chapters later, in connection with the "Studies of the Definitive" and the work of Charles Meryon.

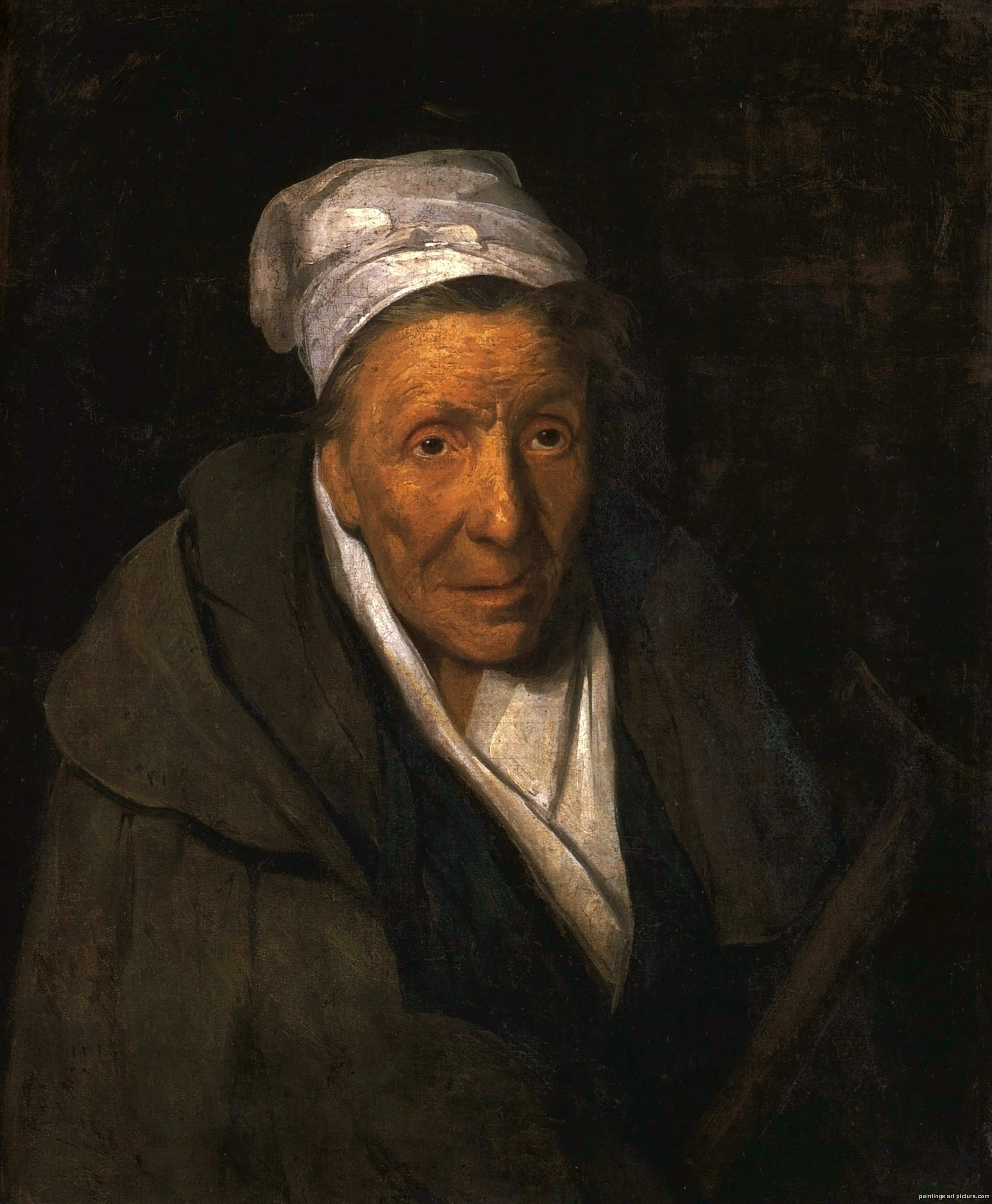

Théodore Géricault
A Madwoman and Compulsive Gambler, 1822

Louvre, Paris

Fine arts

- AedW II, p. 23
Example of Géricault's works created after the creation of the Raft of the Medusa:

"What was vital in Géricault was on the side of renewal, this was expressed in his choice of subjects, in his painting style, in the application of colour, the treatment of forms, but his life was that of a cornered, encapsulated one, hatred of the arrogance, the vanity of society drove him to collapse, when at last he spent almost all his time in prisons, asylums and mortuaries."

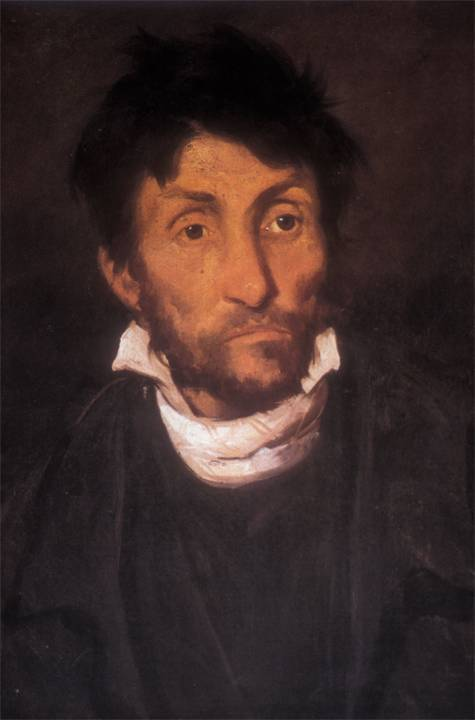

Théodore Géricault
Insane Kleptomaniac, 1822

Louvre, Paris

Fine arts

- AedW II, p. 23
Example of Géricault's works created after the creation of the Raft of the Medusa:

"What was vital in Géricault was on the side of renewal, this was expressed in his choice of subjects, in his painting style, in the application of colour, the treatment of forms, but his life was that of a cornered, encapsulated one, hatred of the arrogance, the vanity of society drove him to collapse, when at last he spent almost all his time in prisons, asylums and mortuaries."

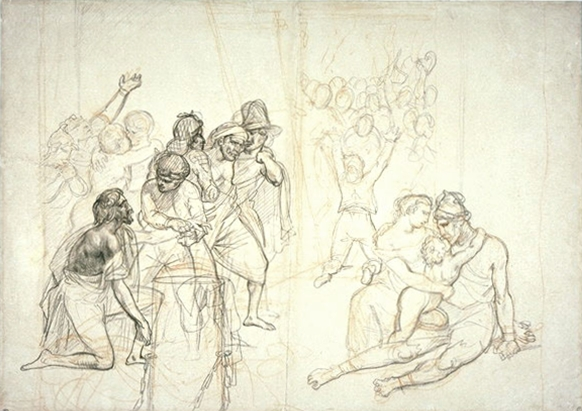

Théodore Géricault
Liberation of the Inquisition Victims, 1823

Louvre, Paris

Fine Arts Sketch for a planned painting, which Géricault could not realise due to illness.

- AedW II, p. 27
Mention in the account of Géricault's dying:

"And yet, until his last hours, he planned great compositions dealing with the horrors of slavery, the liberation of the victims of the Inquisition."

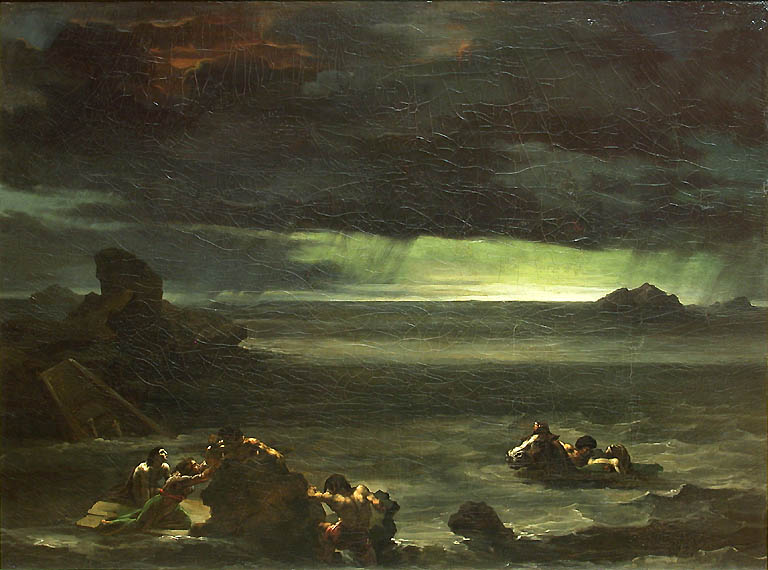

Théodore Géricault
The Flood, 1815-1816

Louvre, Paris

Fine arts

- AedW II, p. 31f.
Description and interpretation as symptomatic of Géricault's life: there is no saving ark in the picture.

"Géricault dismayed us by allowing us to glimpse the process of a passionate psychic event."

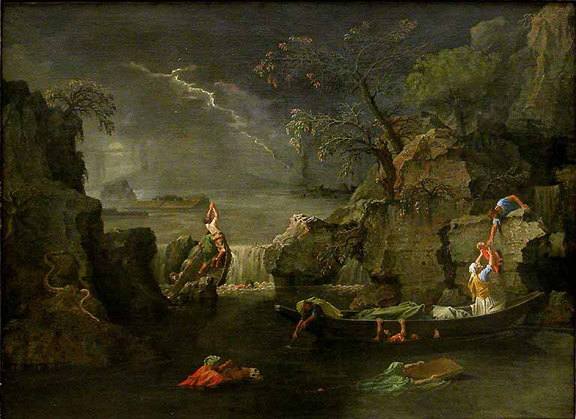

Nicolas Poussin
Winter, 1660-1664

Louvre, Paris

Fine arts

- AedW II, p. 31f.
Description and comparison with Géricault's painting Flood. Poussin's painting served as a model for the latter.

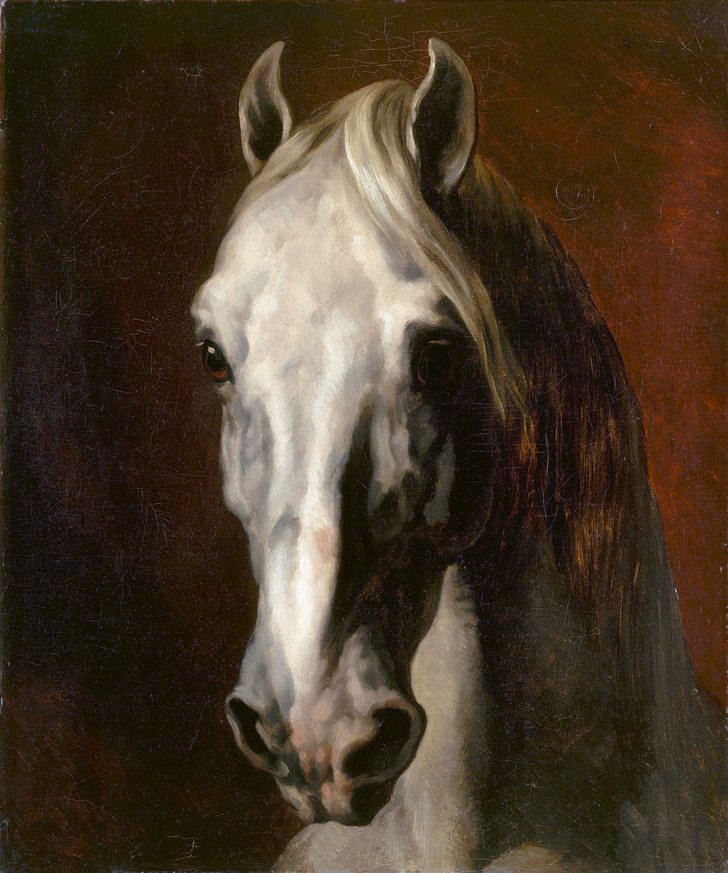

Théodore Géricault
Head of a White Horse (Tete de cheval blanc), c. 1815

Louvre, Paris

Fine arts

- AedW II, p. 32
Mentioned and described as having been painted in the same period as The Flood, with reference to the tenderness unfolded in this painting.

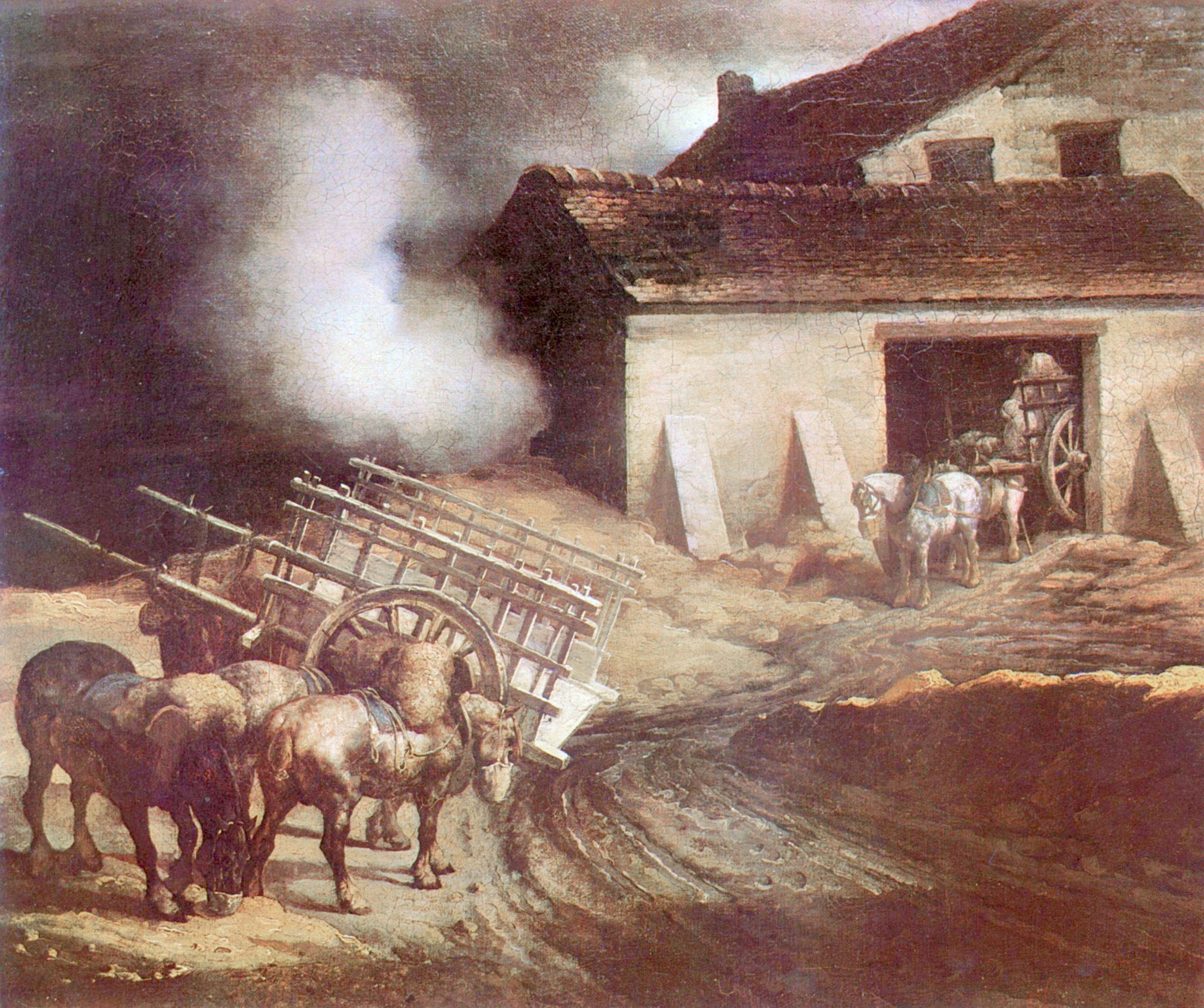

Théodore Géricault
The lime kiln, 1822-1823

Louvre, Paris

Fine arts

- AedW II, p. 32
Description and interpretation of the painting in the context of the last year of Géricault's life and the observation that it does not show a decisive course of development:

"There was no help, no salvation for him; the unheard-of energies stored up in him could only find temporary relief in the paintings he produced; during his brief existence here, painting was the instrument with which he met his inner overpressure; madness hung constantly over him as a rebellion against torpor".

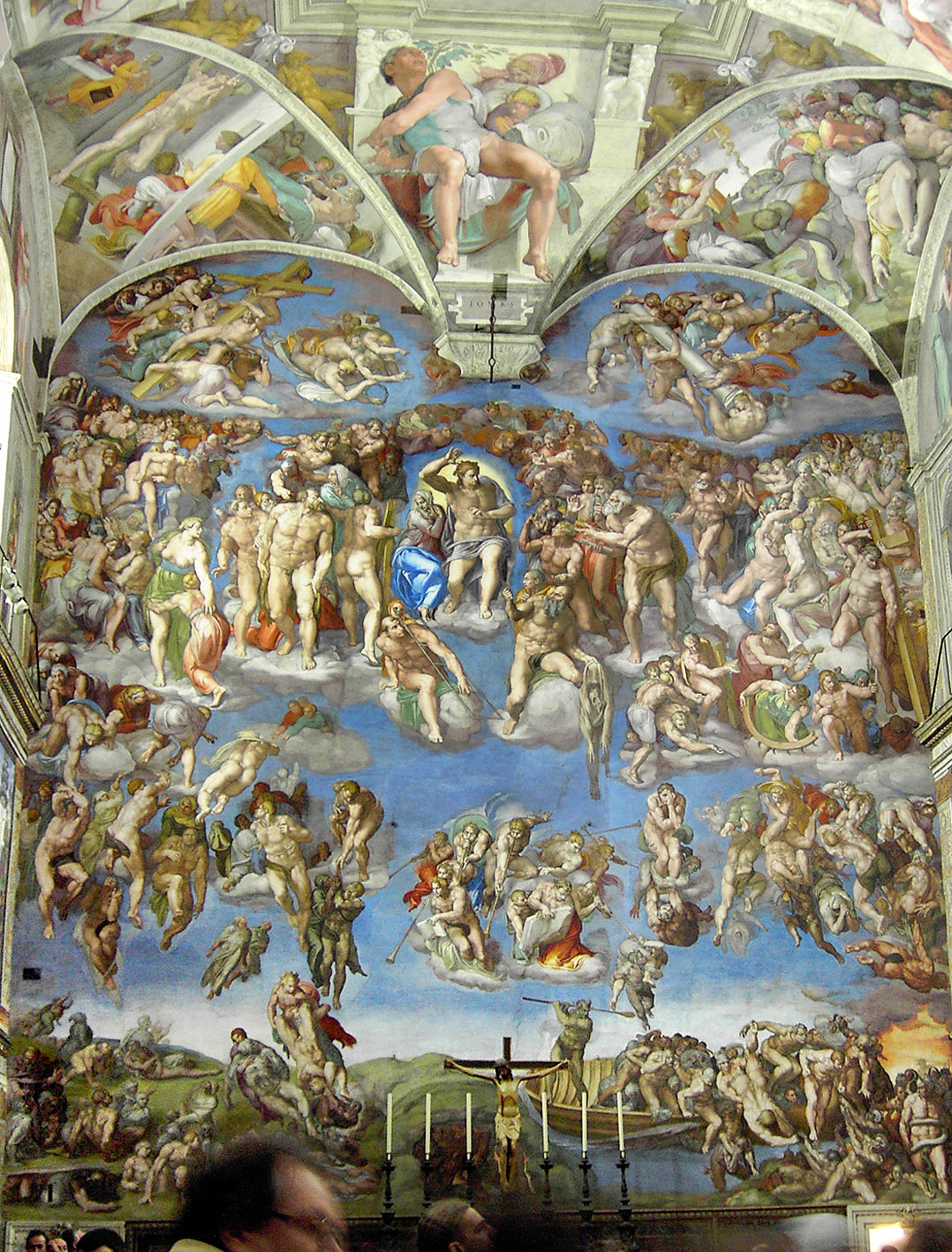

Michelangelo
The Last Judgement, 1534-1541

Sistine Chapel, Rome

Fine arts

- AedW II, p. 33
In Michelangelo's work, the influence on Géricault's Raft of the Medusa is recognised and at the same time the integration into art history:

"Just as he himself had continued lines that had emanated from Michelangelo, Tintoretto, Caravaggio, so Daumier, Courbet, Degas, in his manner also of Gogh, pointed to Géricault with the stroke of their brushes. (...) With his give and take, he stood in the universal relations and connections that constitute the ground of artistic activity."

The direct influence of the painting The Last Judgement, which art historians have recognised, is not named in the novel.

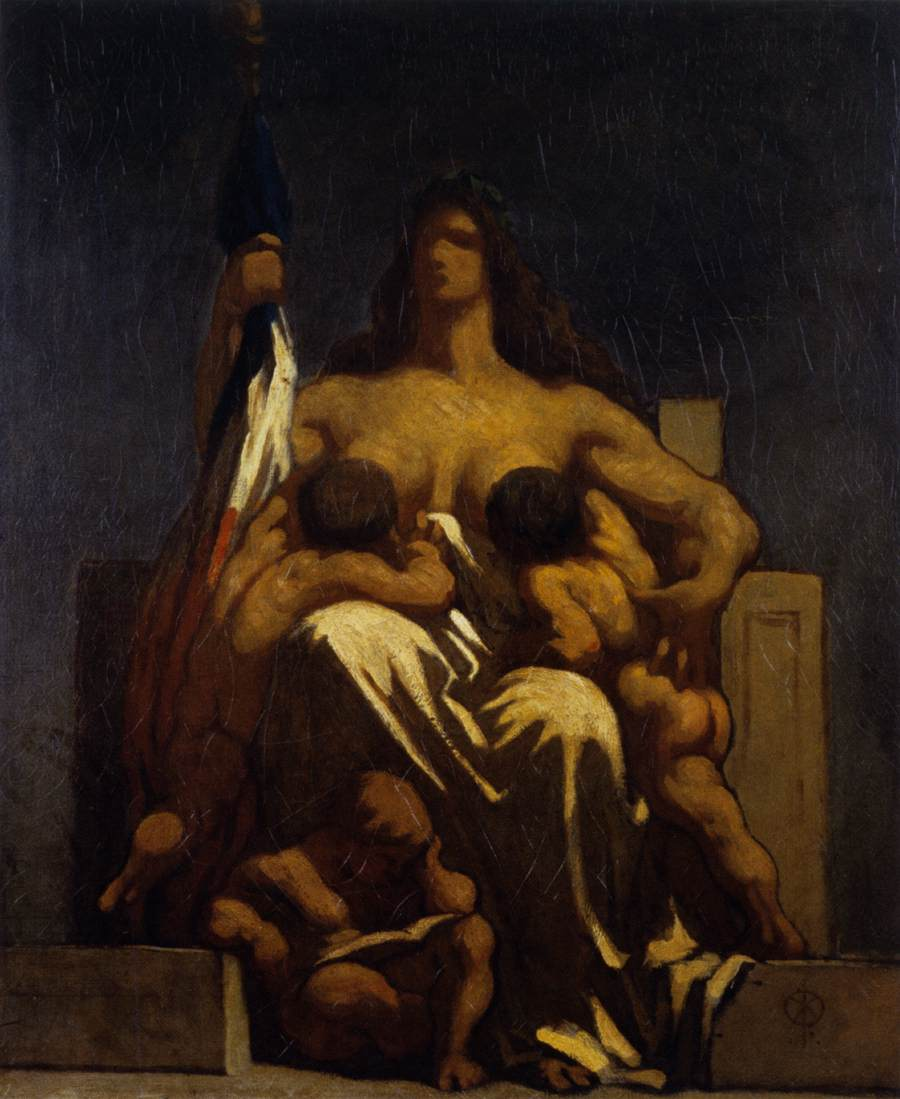

Honoré Daumier
Allegory of the Republic, 1848

Bildende Kunst

Fine Arts

- AedW II, S. 33
Discussion as a continuation of Géricault's Raft of the Medusa and classification in the sequence of art history:

Just as he himself had continued lines that had emanated from Michelangelo, Tintoretto, Caravaggio, so Daumier, Courbet, Degas, in his manner also from Gogh, pointed to Géricault with the stroke of their brushes. (...) With his give and take, he stood in the universal relationships and connections that constitute the ground of artistic activity.

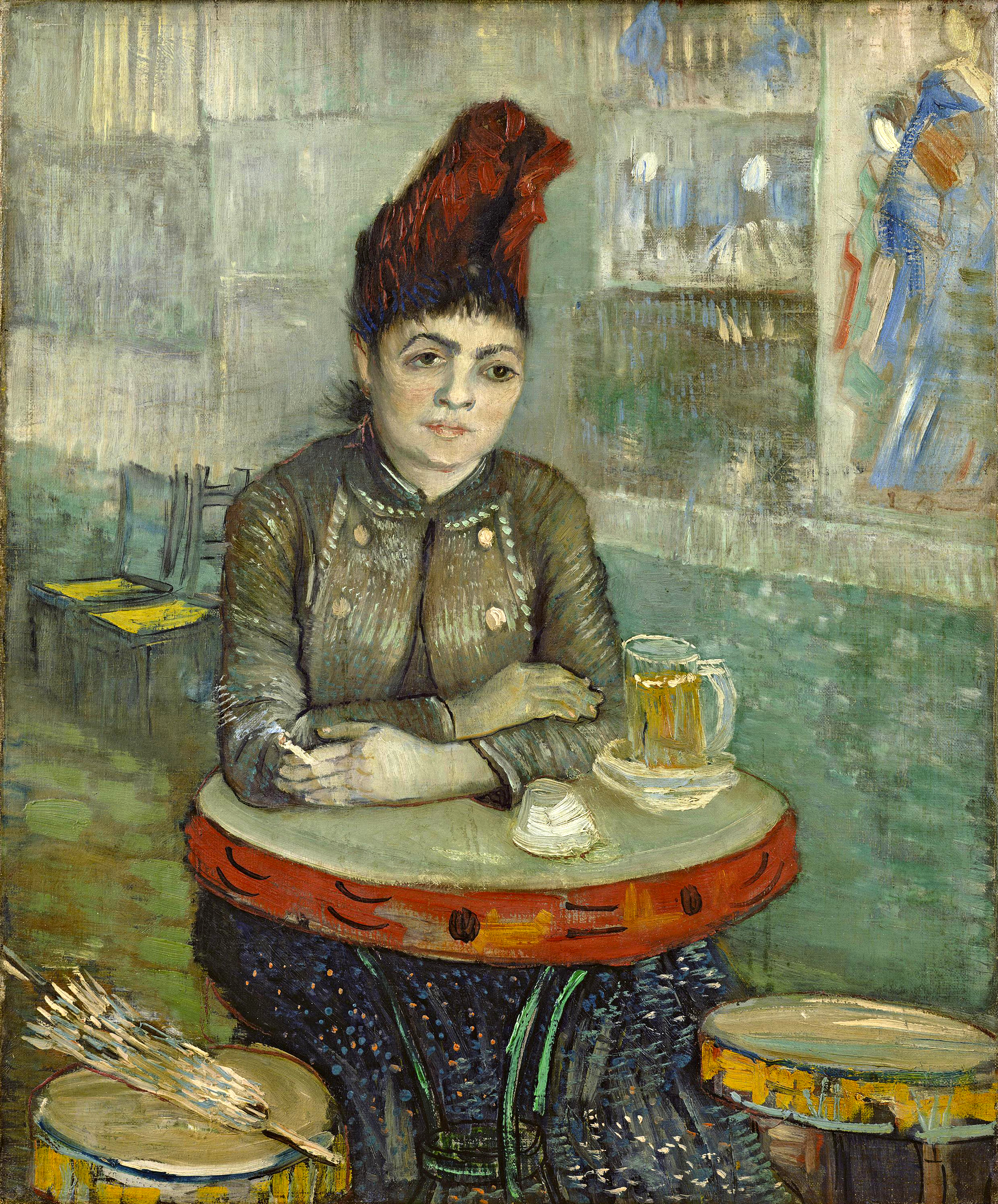

Vincent van Gogh
Agostina Segatori Sitting in the Café du Tambourin, 1887

Rijksmuseum, Amsterdam

Fine Arts
Agostina Segatori was the owner of the Café du Tambourin, patroness and temporary mistress of Van Gogh.

- AedW II, p. 34 f.
In the depiction of an imaginary scene in which the protagonists meet the artist in Montmartre, the café Le Tambourin is mentioned:

He came towards us from a steep alley, in his coat of sheepskin, with his cap of rabbit fur, with a shaggy red beard, under his arm a paint-damp picture that he had painted that morning in Place Pigalle, and for which he still wanted to find a place on the crowded walls of the Café Tambourin

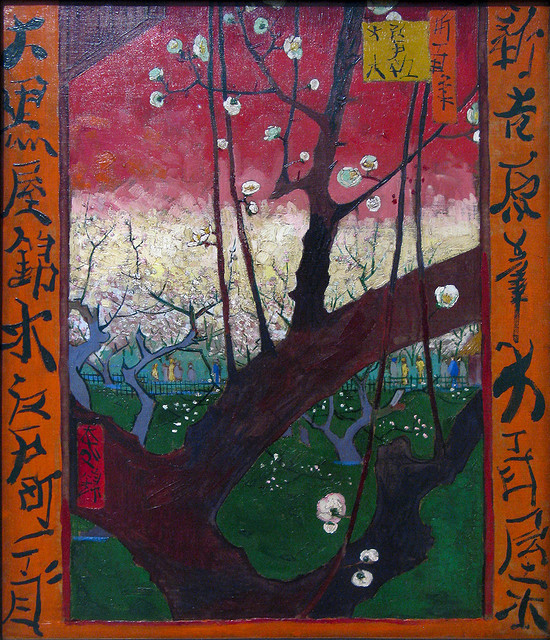

Vincent van Gogh
Flowering plum tree, after Hiroshige, 887

Van Gogh Museum, Amsterdam

Fine arts

- AedW II, p. 35
Example of a painting by Van Gogh painted from a woodcut by the Japanese artist Utagawa Hiroshige; in the novel, while depicting an imaginary scene, the Japanese woodcuts hanging in the Café Tambourin next to numerous paintings by Van Gogh are mentioned.

Camille Corot
The Italian Agostina, 1866

National Gallery of Art, Washington

Fine Arts

- AedW II, p. 34f.
In the depiction of an imaginary scene of meeting Van Gogh in Montmartre, the latter meets "Corot, Monet, Seurat, whom he did not recognise". A relationship is established through Agostina Segatori, the owner of Café Le Tambourin, who was painted by Corot in 1866 and who was Van Gogh's patron some twenty years later.

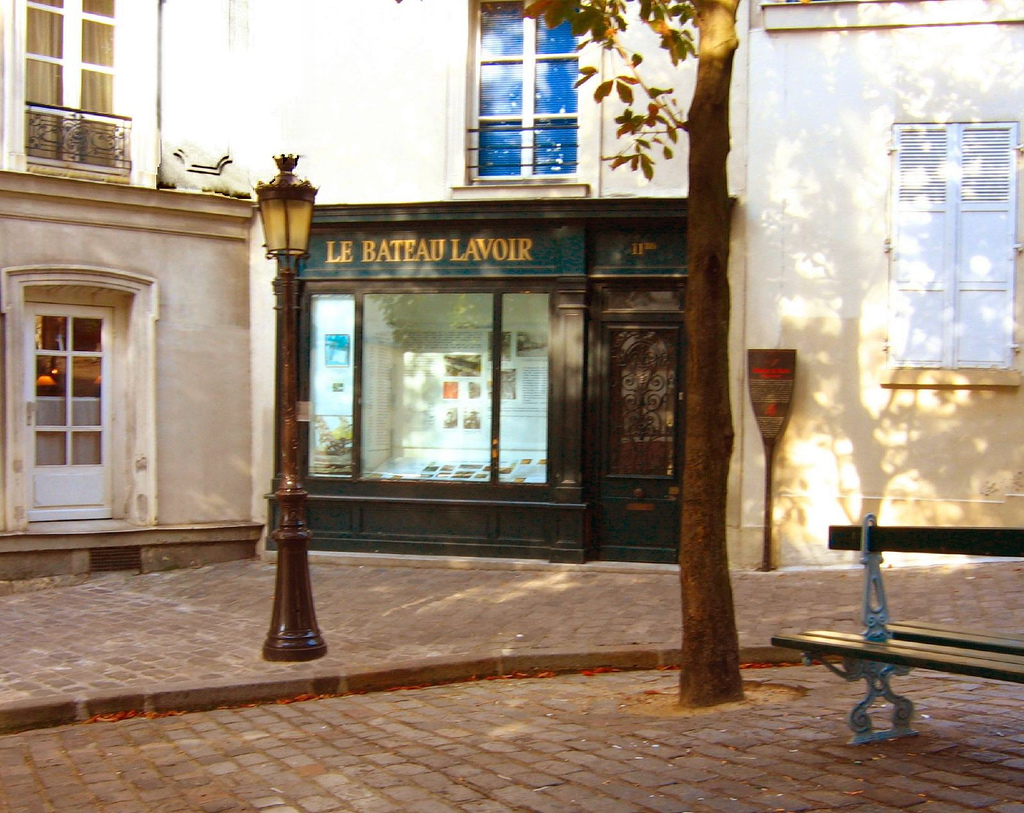

Location
Bateau-Lavoir,

Paris, Montmartre, Rue Ravignan Le Bateau-Lavoir was a house on Montmartre in Paris on Rue Ravignan that entered art history because at the turn of the 20th century a group of artists who later became famous rented studios and lived there. In 1908, a much-discussed banquet for Henri Rousseau took place here.

- AedW II, p. 37f.
Description of the house and its surroundings:

"The outsiders of culture had retreated to this corner because cheap shelter could be found here. Utrillo, Picasso, Gris, Braque, Herbin, Apollinaire, Laurencin, Brancusi, Severini, Modigliani, Derain, Reverdy, Salmon, Gertrude Stein and Max Jacob had been housed or guests in the stables.

Pablo Picasso
Les Demoiselles d'Avignon, 1907

Museum of Modern Art, New York

Visual arts

- AedW II, p. 38
The painting is mentioned as a work created in the Bateau-Lavoir and thus illustrates the importance of the place as a place of creativity in the dawn of modernity.

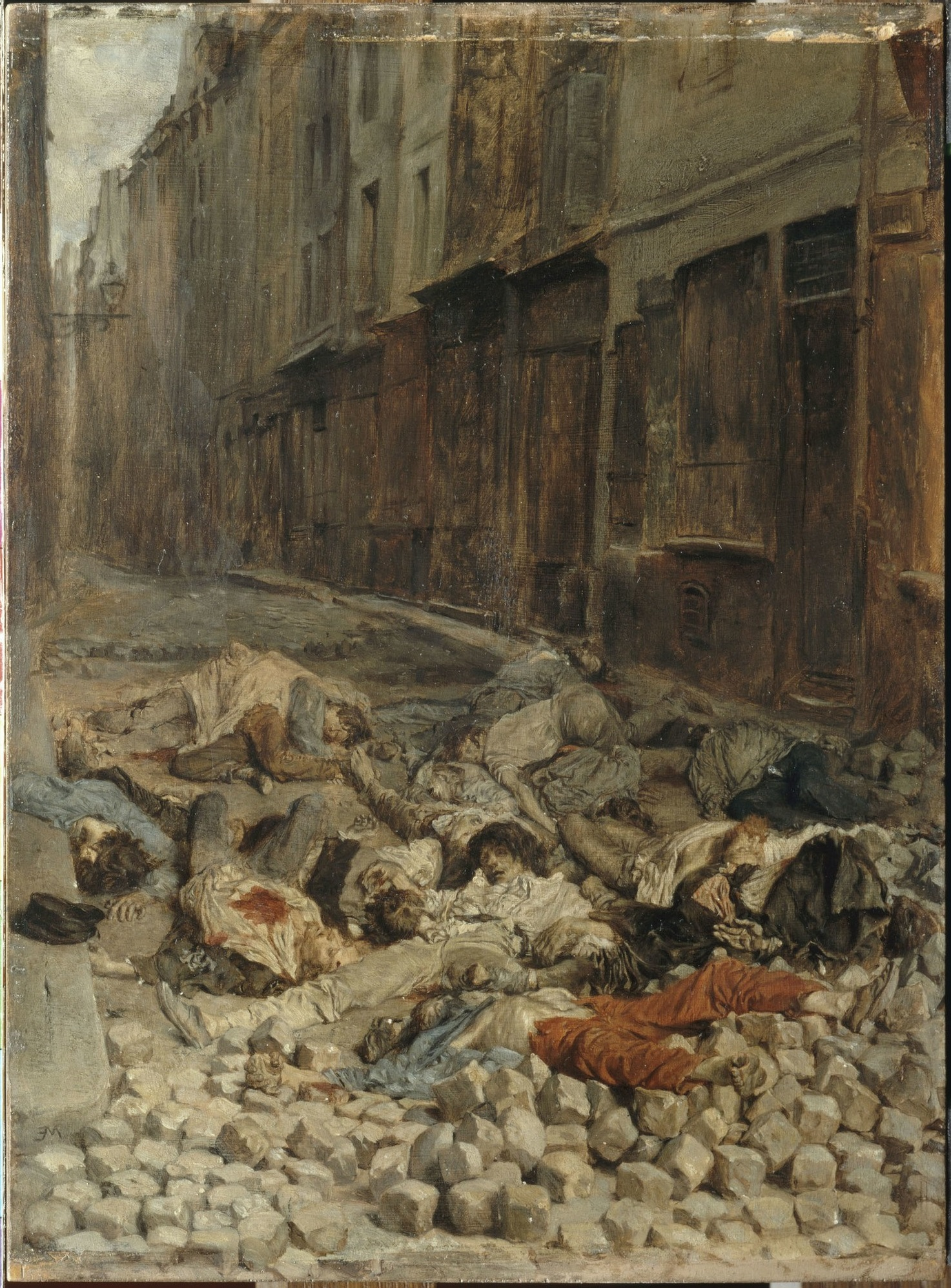

Ernest Meissonier
The barricades in the Rue de la Mortellerie, 1848-1849

Louvre, Paris,

Fine art
The painting depicts a scene from the June 1848 uprising in France. After the reign of the "Citizen King" Louis-Philippe of Orleans had ended in February and the Second French Republic had been proclaimed, social conflicts led to riots between 23 and 27 June 1848.

- AedW II, p. 40
- Motif group: Resistance / Uprising
The first-person narrator sees the painting as a counterpart to Delacroix's painting of the barricades:

"No wider than the span of a hand, without decorative ingredients and noticeable composition, sober as a reportage, it conveys what the painter had seen in June Forty-Eight".

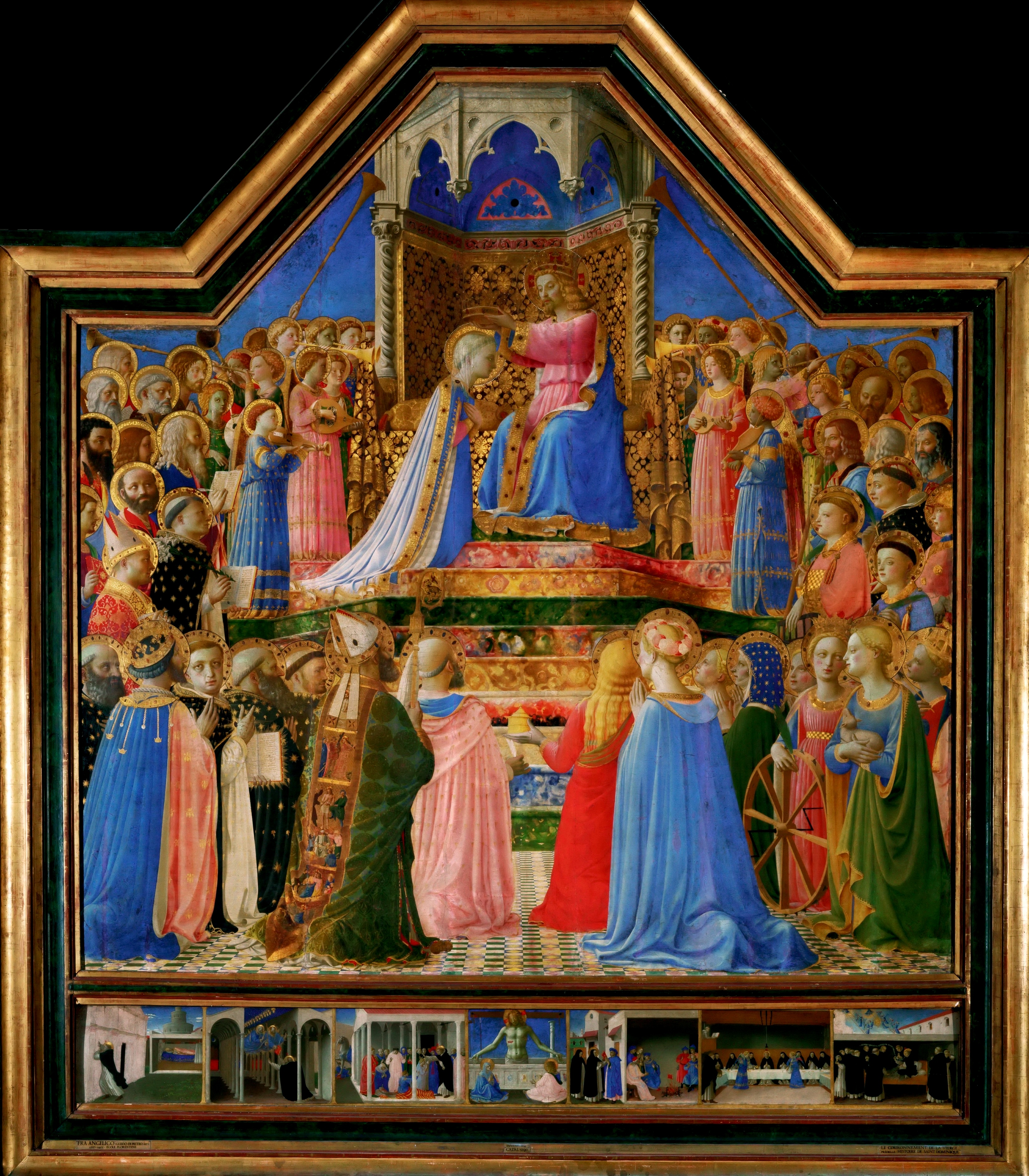

Fra Angelico
Coronation of the Virgin, c. 1430

Louvre, Paris

Fine arts Below the main scene of this painting is a detailed frieze with scenes from the life of Dominic, founder of the Dominican Order.

- AedW II, p. 41
Enumeration of paintings perceived by the first-person narrator during the last visit to the Louvre, more detailed explanations are noted in Peter Weiss's notebooks, in which he discusses in particular the scenes from the life of Dominic.

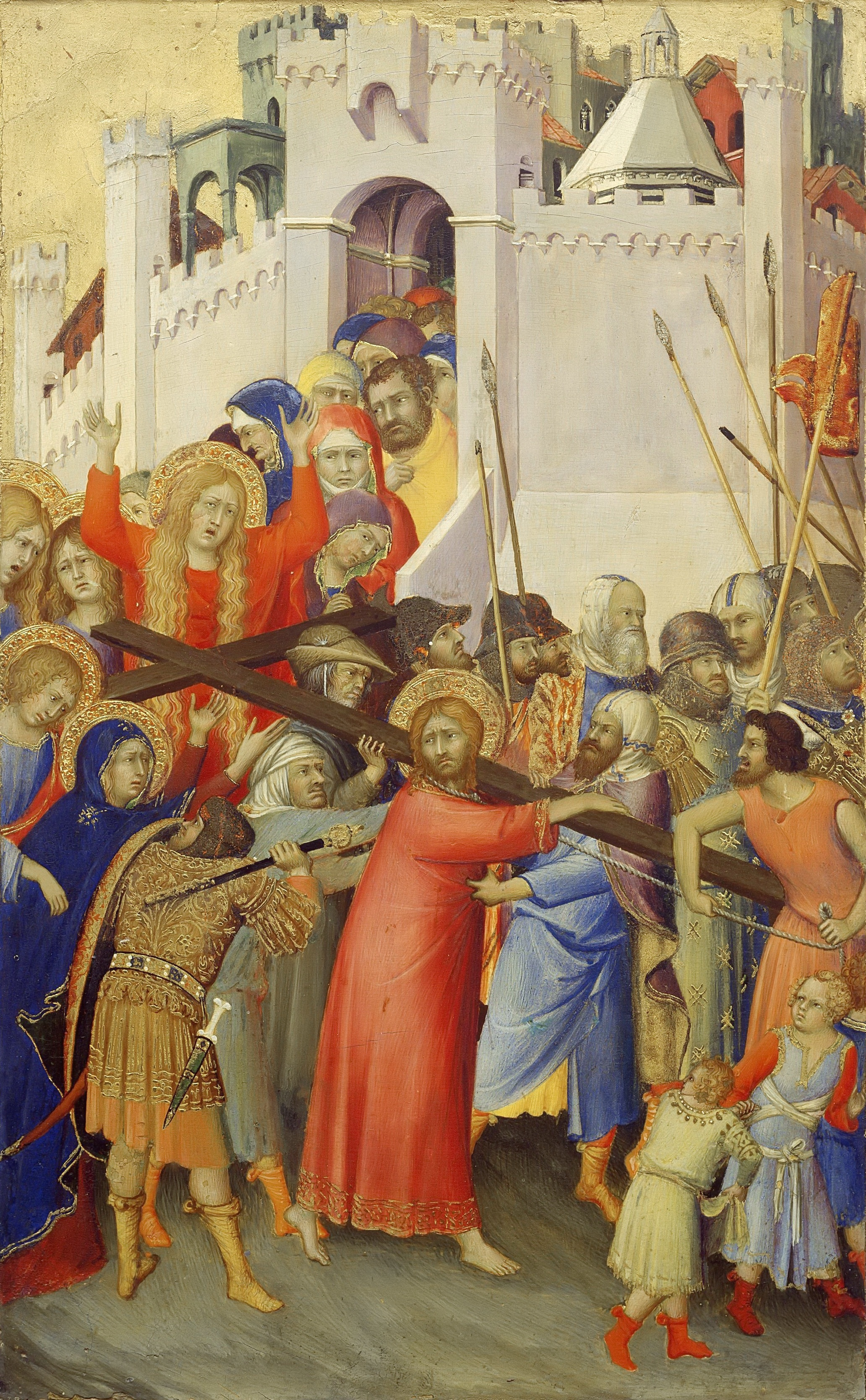

Simone Martini
Orsini Altar, Scene: Carrying of the Cross, 1336-1342

Louvre, Paris

Fine arts

- AedW II, p. 41
- Motif group: Images of horror
Enumeration of paintings perceived by the first-person narrator during the last visit to the Louvre.

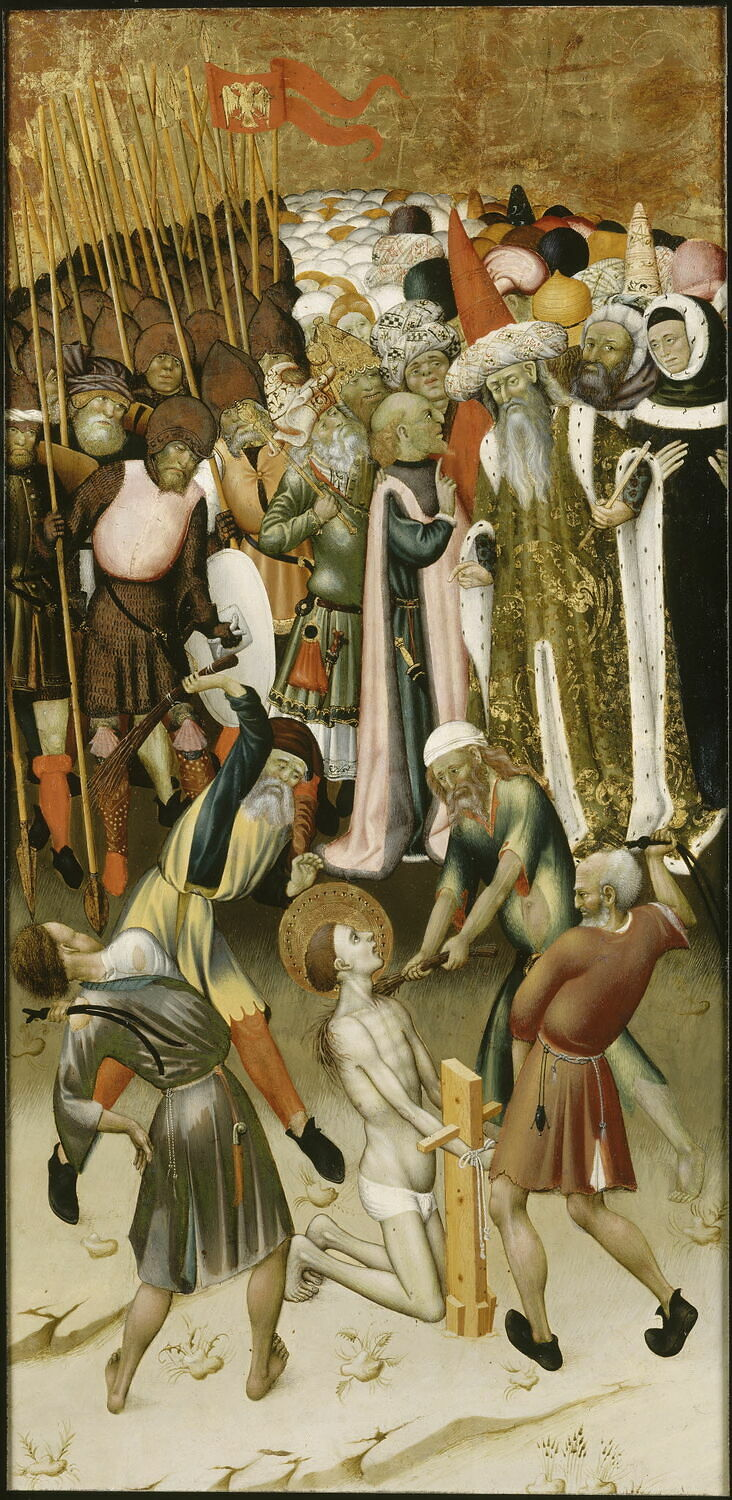

Bernat Martorell
The Flagellation of St George, 1435

Louvre, Paris

Fine arts
The painting is part of an altarpiece whose panels are distributed in various collections, in Paris, Chicago, Berlin.[76]

- AedW II, p. 41
- Motif group: Images of horror
Enumeration of paintings perceived by the first-person narrator during the last visit to the Louvre and description of the images of torture.

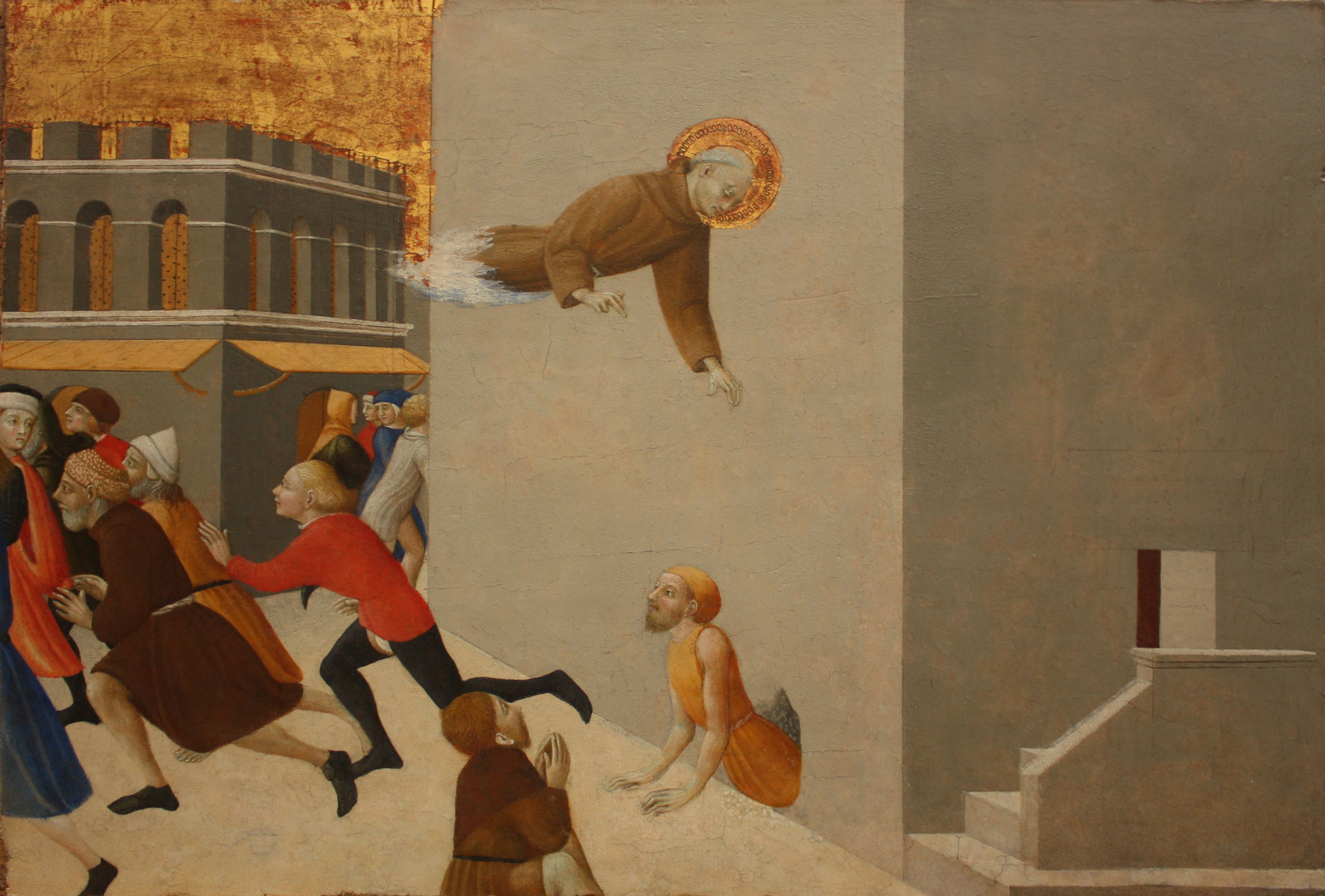

Stefano di Giovanni
The blessed Ranieri frees the poors from a Florentine jail, 1439-1444

Louvre, Paris,

Fine arts The painting is part of the predella, an altarpiece.

- AedW II, p. 41
- Motif group: Resistance / Revolt
Description and personal interpretation of the first-person narrator during the last visit to the Louvre, in contrast to the other pictures, the pictures of torture, this is seen by him as a metaphor of a utopian moment, promising salvation:

"It contained little in the way of arguments with an entire epoch, did not want to roll up all the dubiousness and complexes connected with the creative process, it was just there, existing entirely for itself".

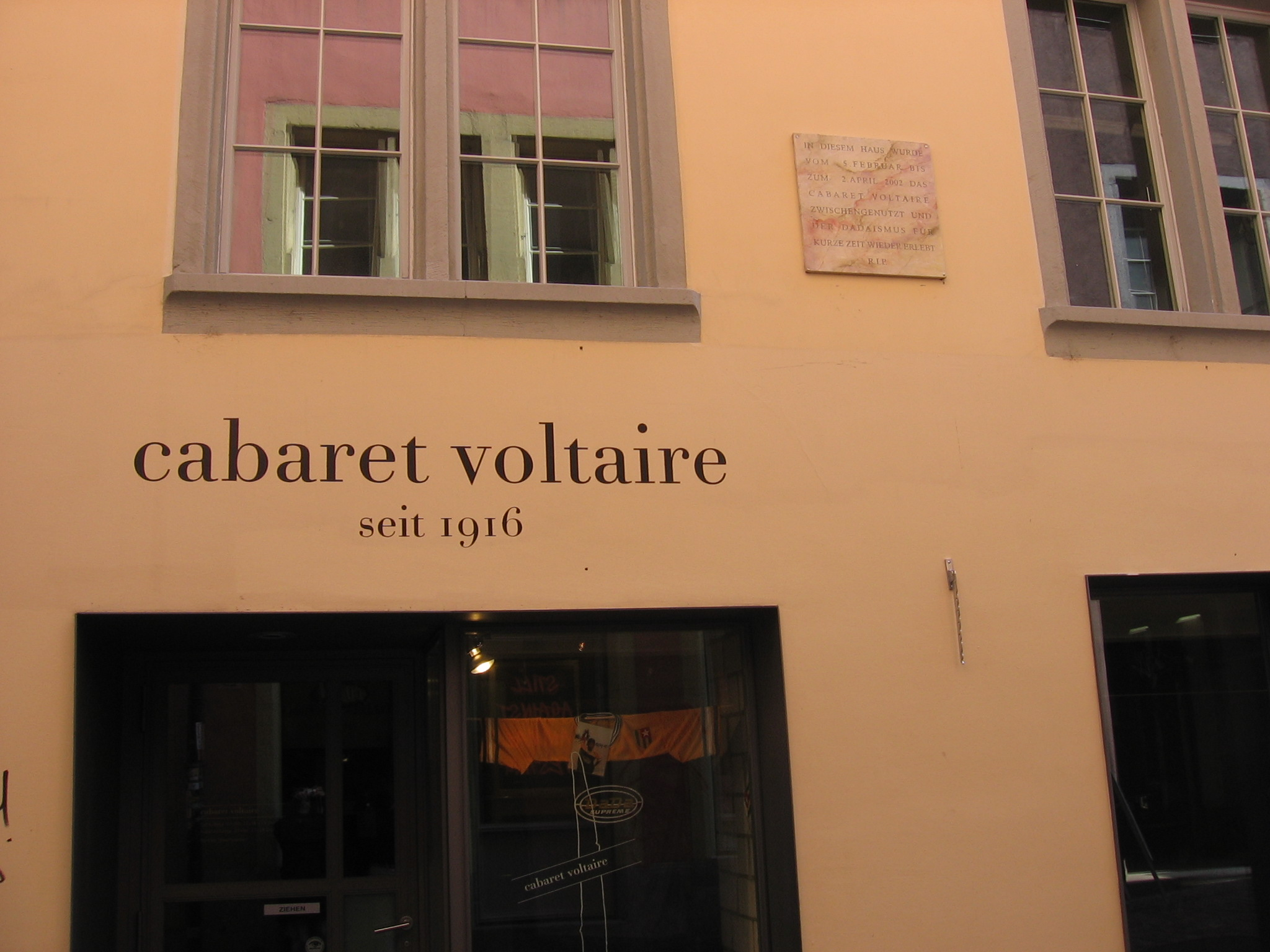

Location
Cabaret Voltaire

Place, Zürich, Spiegelgasse

In Spiegelgasse in Zürich, Hugo Ball opened the Cabaret Voltaire on 5 February 1916, which is considered the birthplace of Dadaism. Only a few houses away was the then residence of Lenin and Krupskaya.

- AedW II, p. 55ff.
Cabaret Voltaire "became the symbol of the violent, double, the true and the dreamed revolution".

P.G. Lotorew
Portrait of Karl Marx, 1917

Moscow, Lenin Museum

Fine Art
Lotorev was a Saint Petersburg factory worker, the painting was given to Lenin in 1818 by a delegation of the workers and is now on display in the Lenin Museum.

- AedW II, p. 64
In a detailed description of Lenin's study, this Marx portrait is mentioned.

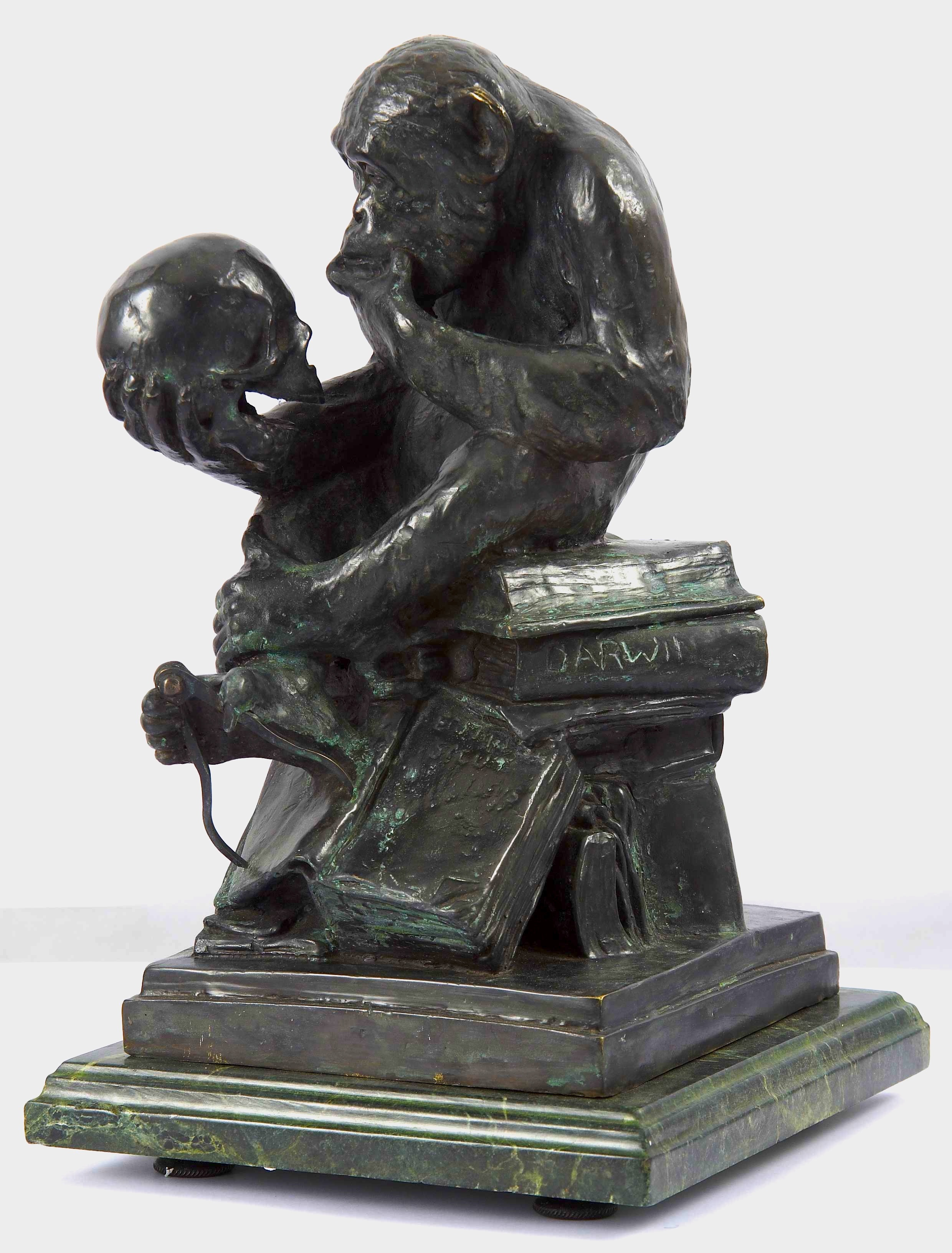

Hugo Rheinhold
Monkey with skull, 1892

Lenin received this sculpture in 1922 as a guest gift from the US industrialist and art collector Armand Hammer and placed it on his desk in the Kremlin.

- AedW II, p. 64
This bronze is mentioned in a detailed description of Lenin's study.

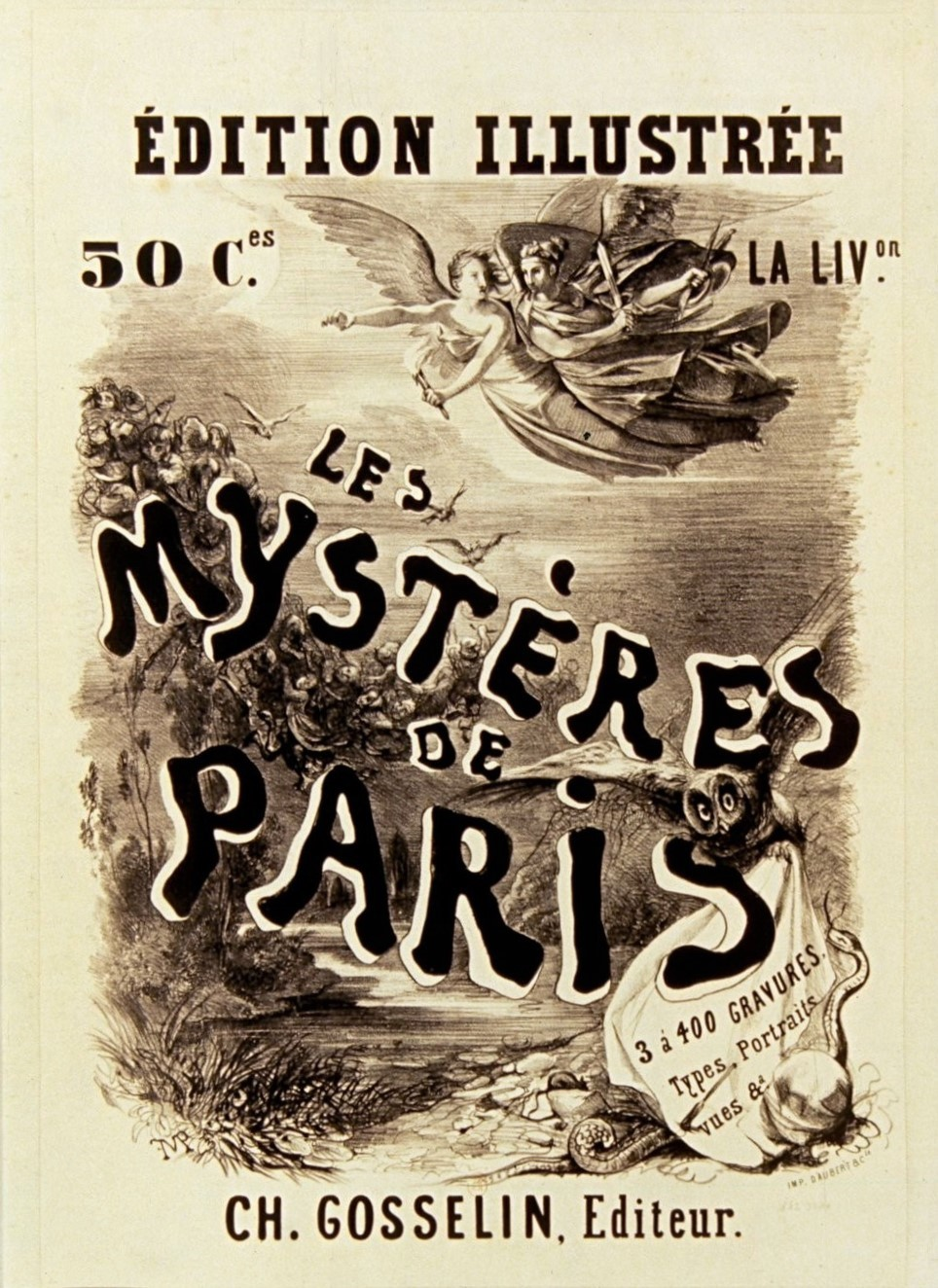

Eugène Sue
The Mysteries of Paris, 1843

Literature
The episodes of Les Mystères were first published as feuilletons in the daily newspaper Journal des débats and became a literary and social event, dealing with intriguing aristocratic parties and especially the Parisian lower class milieu and its difficult everyday life between work, misery and crime.

- AedW II, p. 65ff.
In the description and depiction of the novel and its background, a comparison with the novel's present is prefaced:

"The melodrama of violent crime that played out before us today had already found a form a hundred years ago, in Sue's work, which, with its feuilleton technique, its obscure, dubious characters, its details often painted in garish colours, corresponded to present-day events."

In the context of the prints and poems of Charles Meryon, thoughts of Arthur Rimbaud and Friedrich Hölderlin, the first-person narrator considers the city, and in particular the changes brought about by Haussmann's urban renewal of Paris in the mid-nineteenth century, and sets them in relation to political and social conditions.

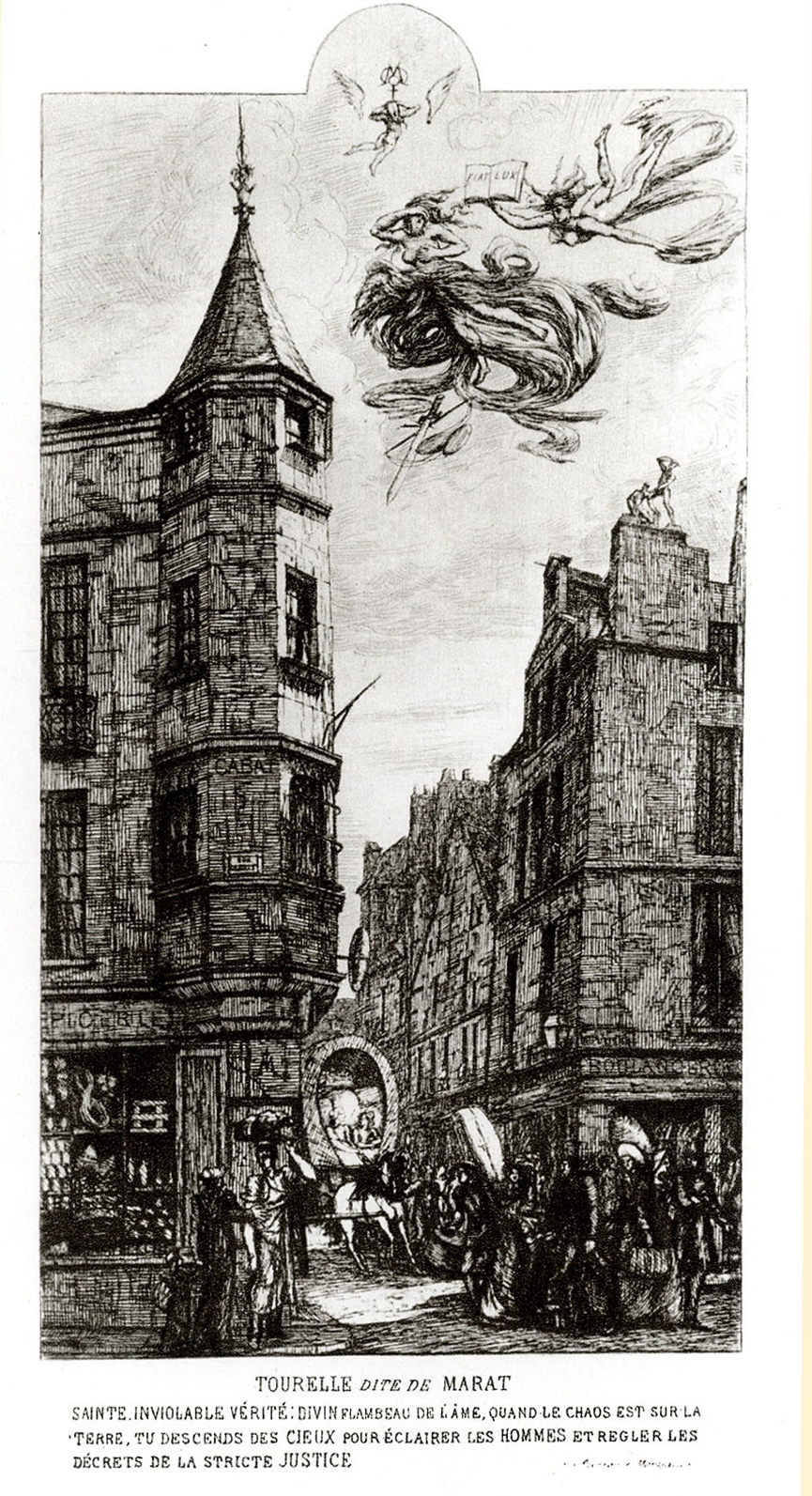

Charles Meryon
Tourelle, Rue de l'Ecole de Médicine, 1861

Etching

Fine art from the graphic cycle Eaux-Fortes sur Paris

- AedW II, pp. 66ff, 281
n a compilation of Eugène Sue's The Mysteries of Paris with the prints and poems of Charles Meryon, Thoughts on Arthur Rimbaud and Friedrich Hölderlin, the first-person narrator looks at the city and in particular the changes brought about by the Haussmannian urban renewal of Paris in the mid-nineteenth century and sets them in relation to political and social conditions. A metaphor in this is the depiction of Tourelle with its image of the house where Jean Paul Marat was assassinated in 1793.

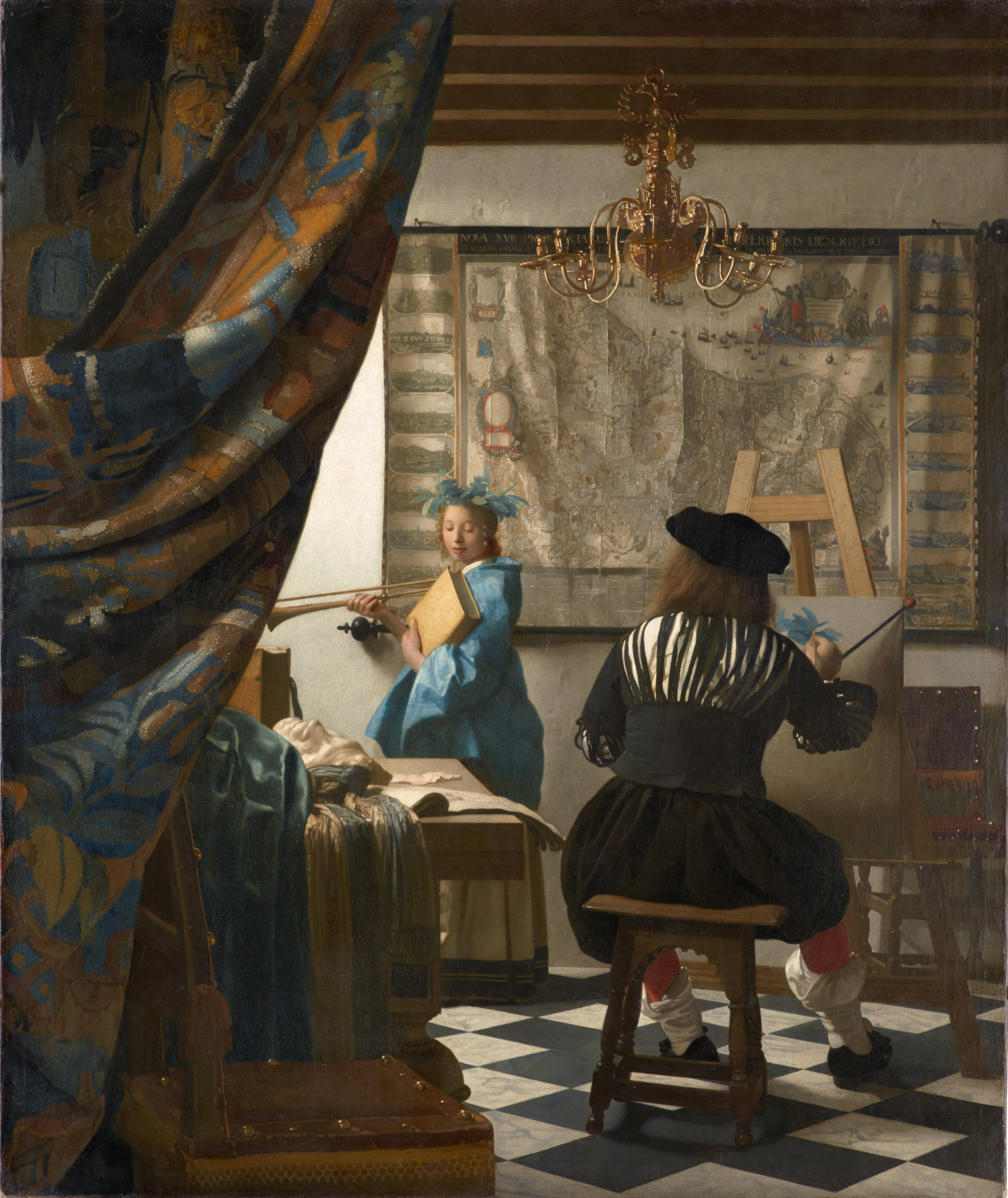

Jan Vermeer
The Art of Painting,1664/68

Kunsthistorisches Museum

Fine Art Vermeer's painting shows a map by Visscher depicting the Netherlands with its undivided provinces before the armistice with Spain in 1609.

- AedW II, p. 75
Symbolic with the coincidence of the map of Belarus, the name for the united Belarus, in Lenin's study and the map depicted in Vermeer's painting.

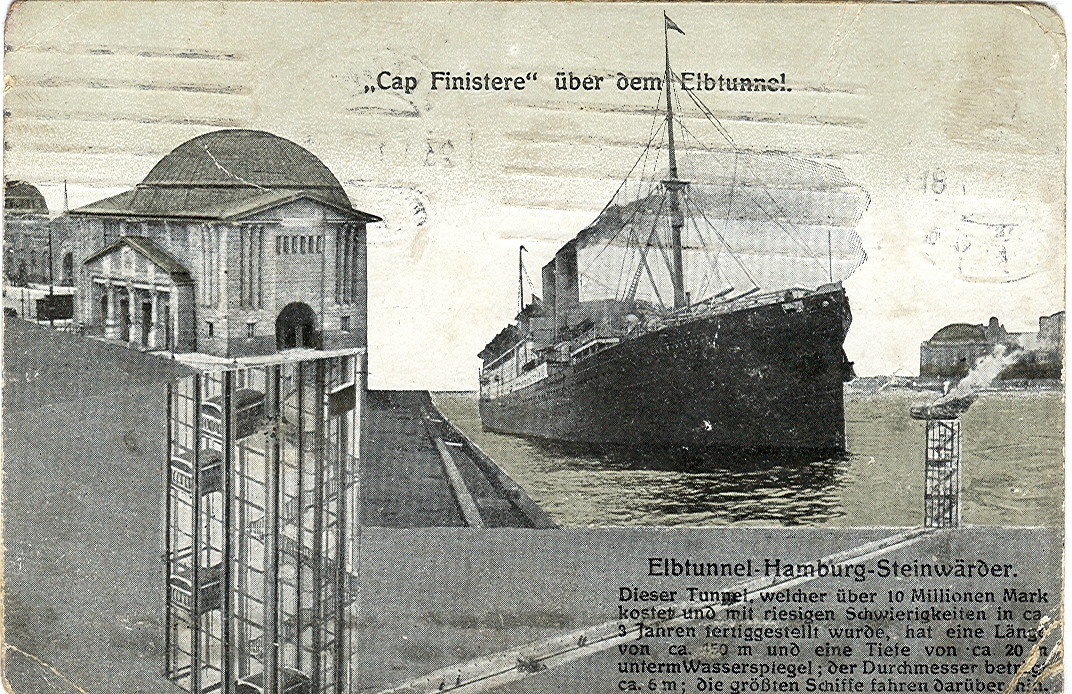

Otto Stockhausen
St. Pauli Elbtunnel, 1911

Postcard

Building Hamburg, St. Pauli

- AedW II, p. 76
Description in a dream image of the first-person narrator, in which he is initially transported to his childhood. Through surreal dream transmissions, he sees a scene of persecution in which he loses his mother and is himself at the mercy of his own helplessness in the social and political system.

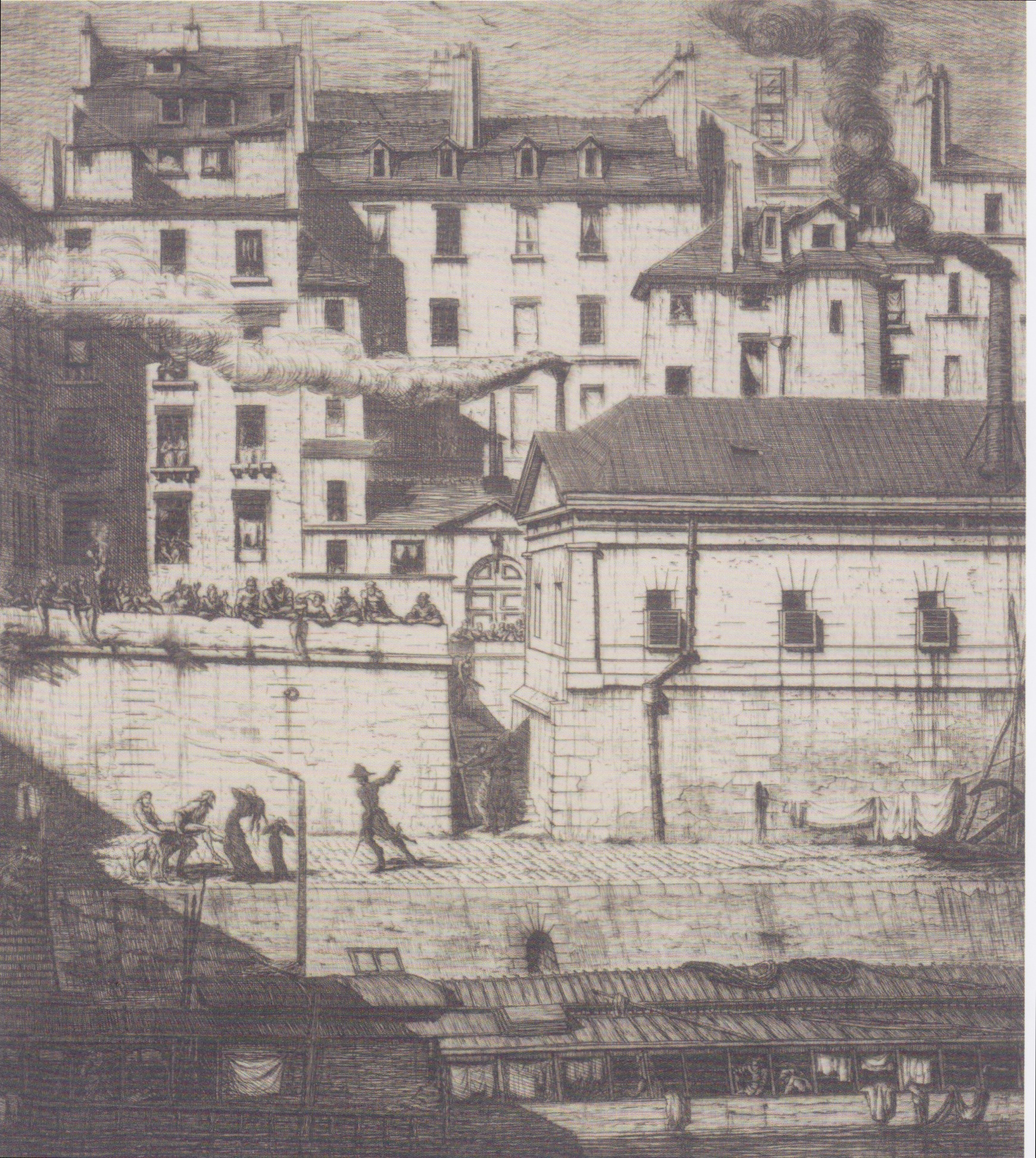

Charles Meryon
The Mortuary, Quai du Marché-Neuf, Paris, 1854

Etching

Fine art from the graphic cycle Eaux-Fortes sur Paris

- AedW II, p. 121
This cityscape of Paris is drawn upon in an argument by the first-person narrator about violent death, into this image he incorporates the description of Géricault's studies of decapitated people, he calls his thoughts the study of the definitive.

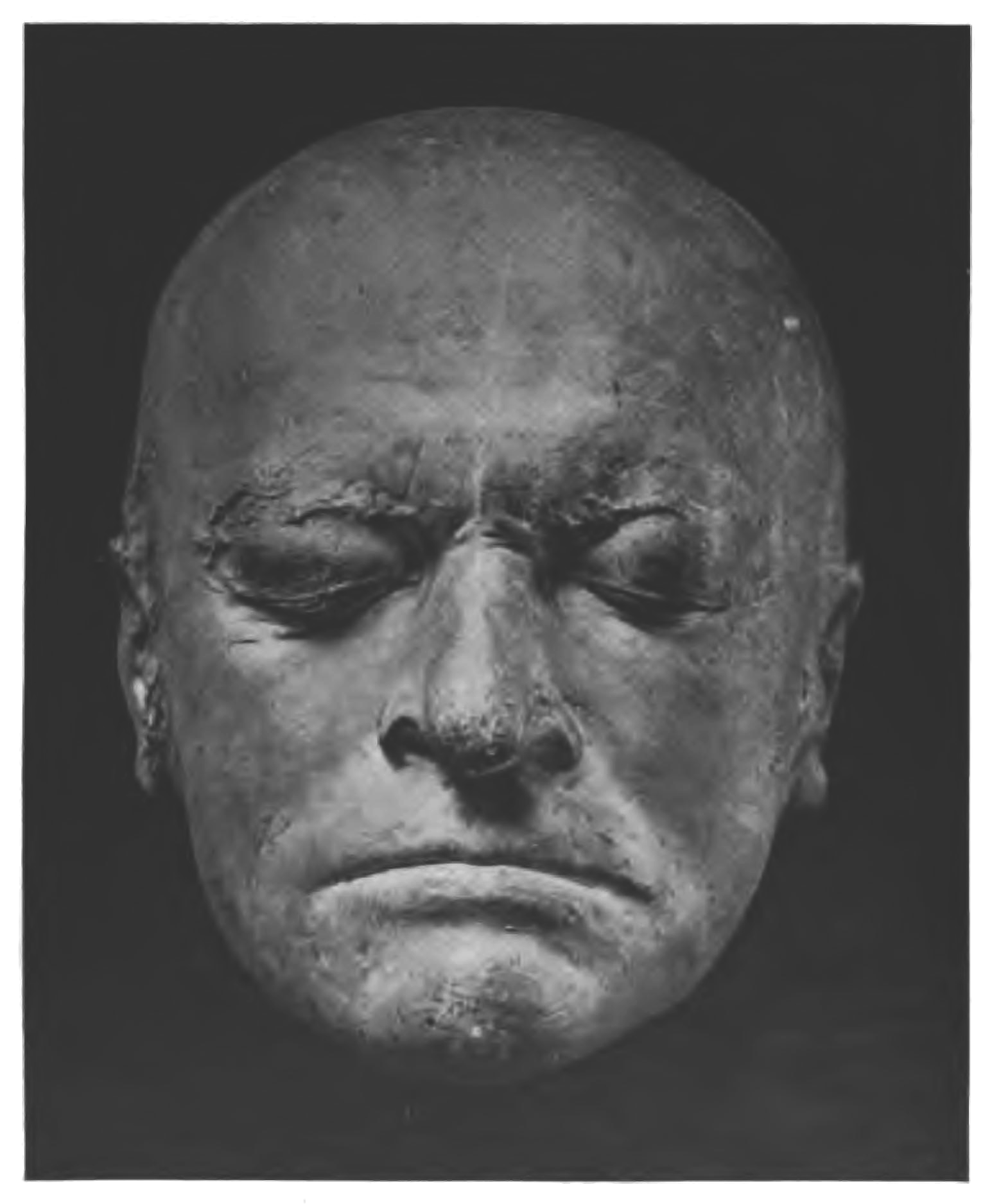

William Blake
Living mask, 1823

by J.S. Delville

Visual arts The artistic work of the English poet, nature mystic and painter was largely rejected by his contemporaries. It was not until the mid-19th century that his innovative works received general recognition.

- AedW II, p. 135
The mask is mentioned in the account by Rosalinde von Ossietzky, Carl von Ossietzky's daughter, of her father's persecution and death:

"until the very last plaster shell, which an unknown sculptor, who had crept into the death room at night, took from his face and was able to take out of the country, a mask quite alien, cold, similar to Schiller's, to Blake's".

There is further mention of Blake in the section on Bert Brecht's library:

"once again Blake was lifted up, no tomb could do him justice."

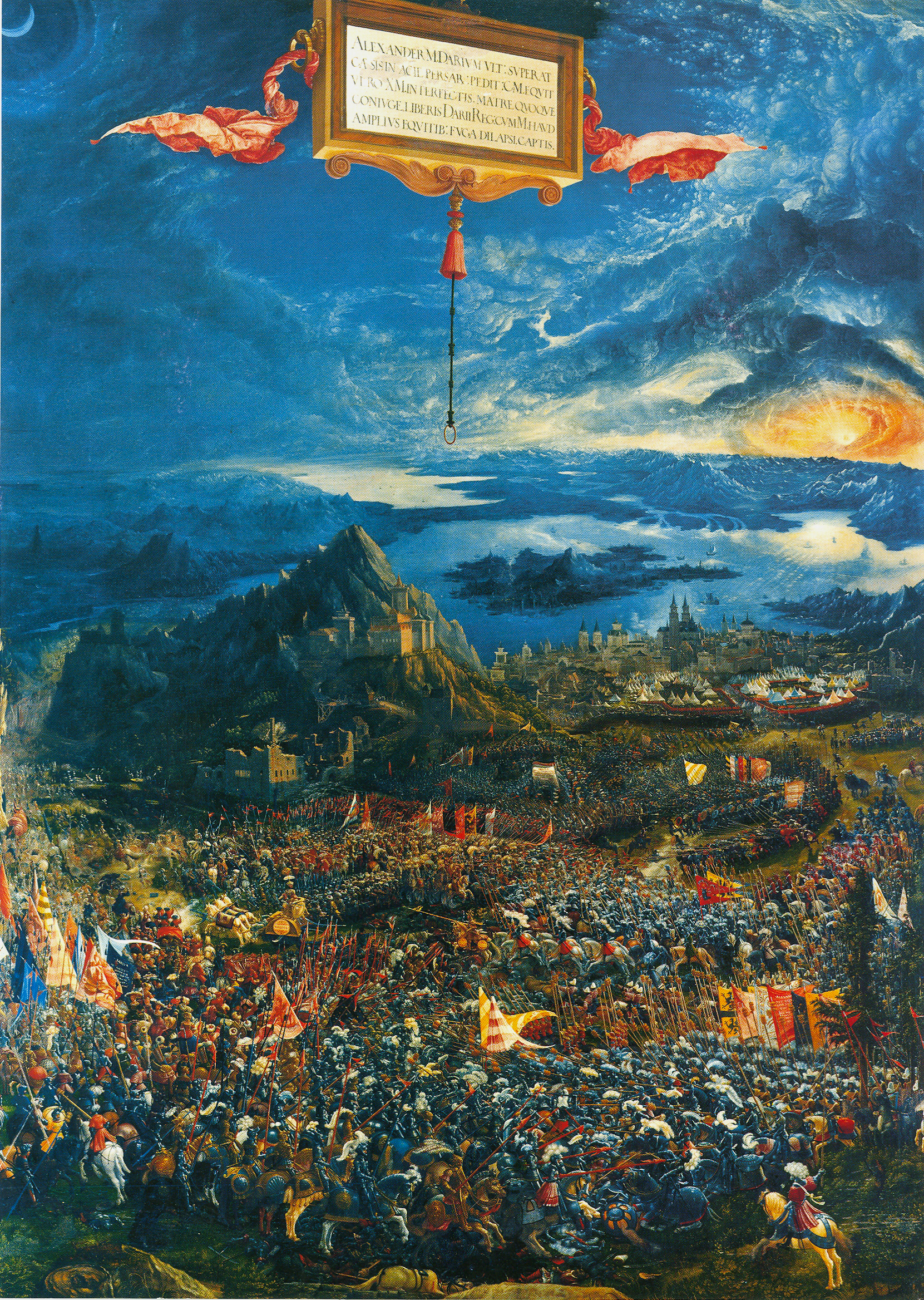

Albrecht Altdorfer
The Battle of Alexander at Issus, 1528–1529

Old Pinakothek, Munich

Fine Art The painting depicts the Battle of Issos in 333 BC by Alexander the Great against the Persian king Darius.

- AedW II, p. 142
- Motif group: War
Comparison of the painting with the political situation in Europe at the beginning of the war in 1939; generally referred to as a battle painting in the novel, it can nevertheless be identified through the description as well as notes from Peter Weiss' notebooks.

Hans Tombrock
Discussion about the defeat in the Spanish Civil War at Brecht's home in Lidingö, 1939

Charcoal drawing

Visual arts

- AedW II, p. 142f.
The drawing served Peter Weiss as a model for the description of Bertolt Brecht's house in exile in Lidingö. At the same time, there is an argument about the artist and his relationship to women, which can also be applied to Brecht.

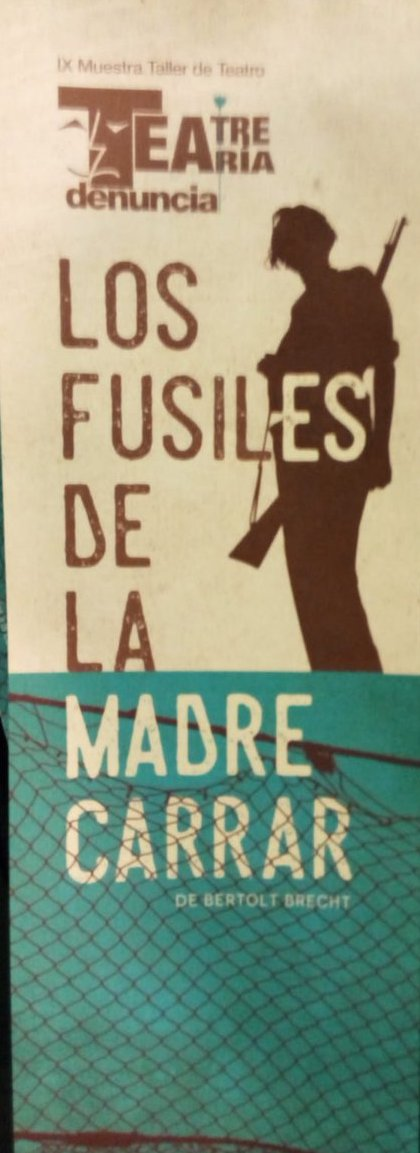

Bertolt Brecht
Flyer for "The Guns of Mrs Carrar", 1937

Play

Literature

- AedW II, p. 147
The play is included in the novel's plot, Brecht expresses here that the play had to be rewritten because of the situation.

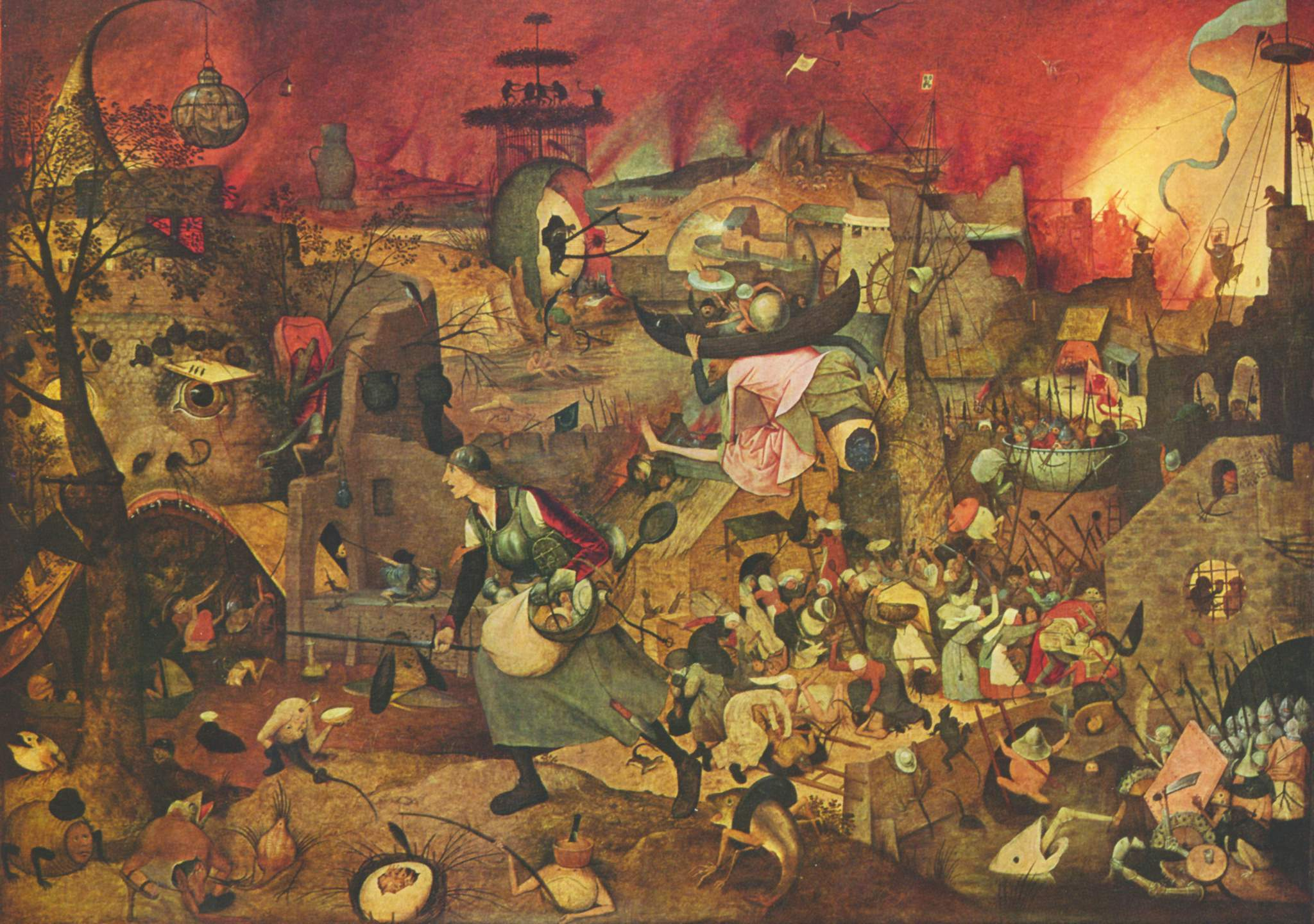

Pieter Bruegel the Elder
Dull Gret, 1563

Museum Mayer van den Bergh, Antwerp,

Fine arts

- AedW II, p. 147ff.
- Motif group: War
Description of the painting in many details, interpretation as a symbol of the conditions in Europe after the Spanish Civil War.

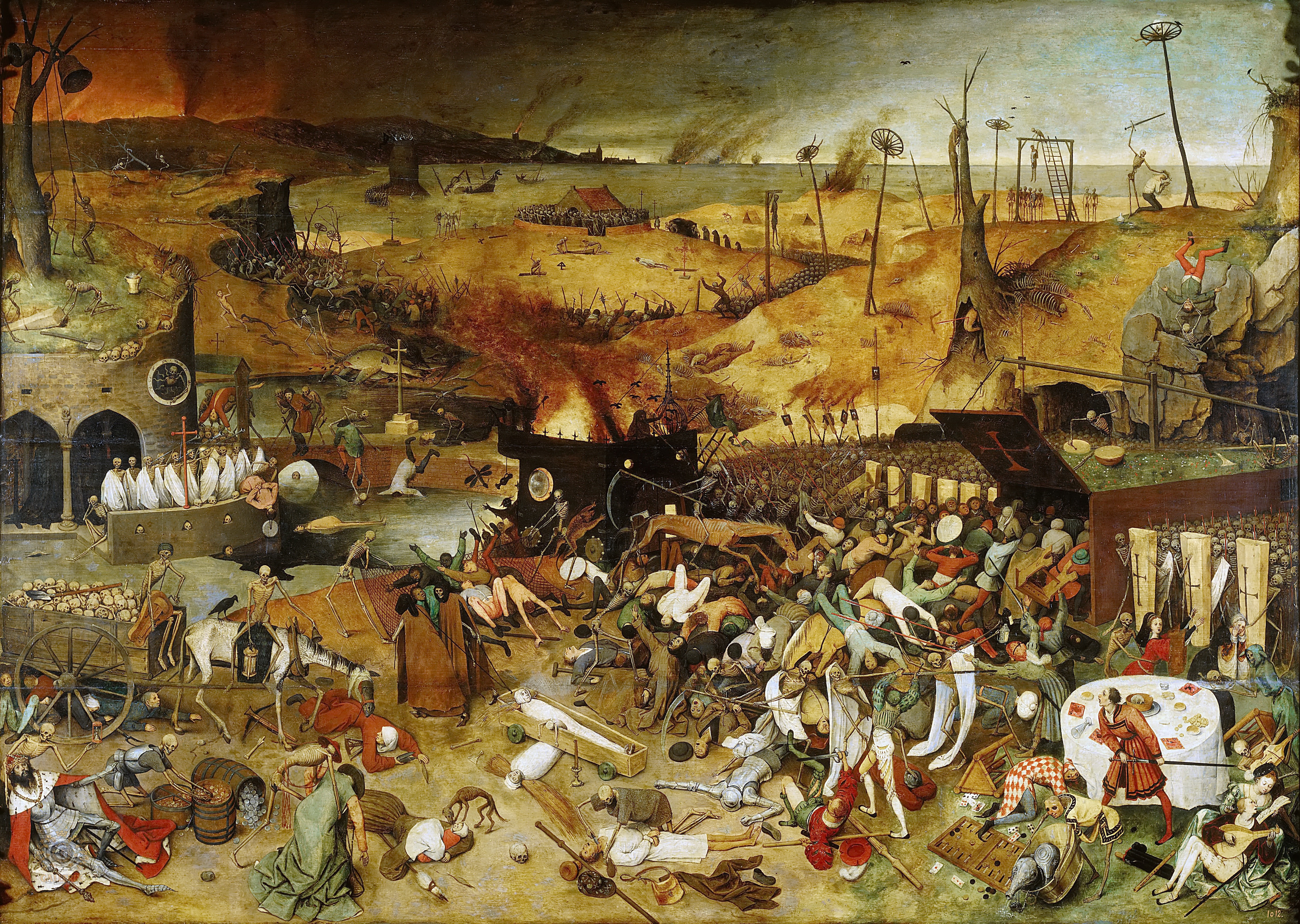

Pieter Bruegel the Elder
The Triumph of Death, 1562-1563

Museo del Prado, Madrid

Fine arts

- AedW II, p. 147ff.
- Motif group: War
Description of the painting in many details, interpretation as a symbol of the conditions in Europe after the Spanish Civil War.

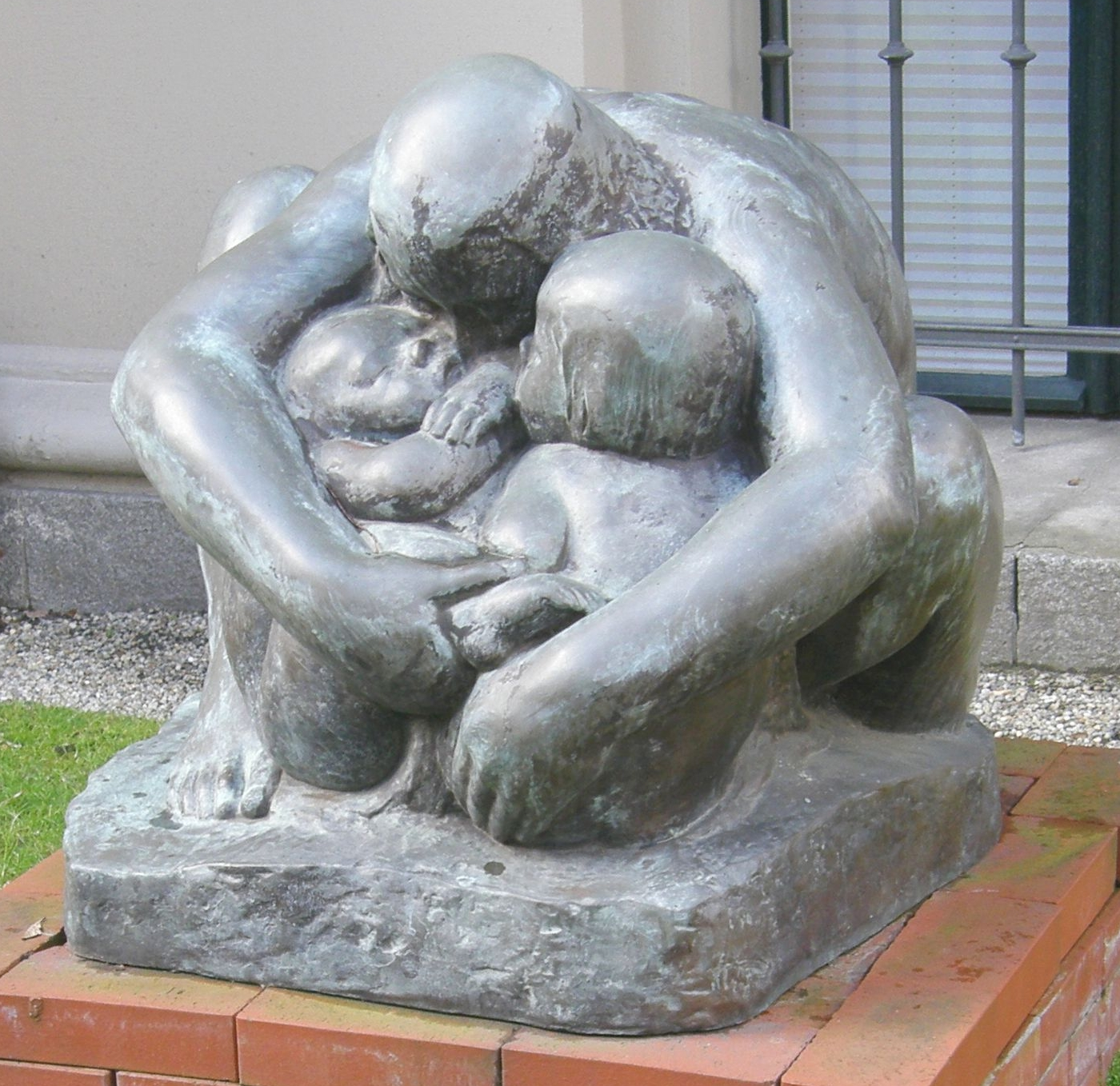

Käthe Kollwitz
Mother with Children,1927-1937

Käthe Kollwitz Museum, Berlin

Fine Art

- AedW II, p. 152
The brief mention of the artist in connection with Margarete Steffin,

"whose features were reminiscent of a drawing by Käthe Kollwitz"

establishes a pictorial reference to the workers' wives she depicted as a counter-image to Brueghel's Dull Gret, as is evident in this sculpture of the preserving mother.

Green wind. Green branches.
The ship out on the sea
and the horse on the mountain.
With the shadow at the waist
she dreams on her balcony,
green flesh, green hair,
with eyes of cold silver.

— From "Romance Sonámbulo",
("Sleepwalking Romance"), García Lorca
Federico García Lorca
Romance sonámbulo,1928

Poem

Visual arts

- AedW II, p. 153
"This green. This green that Lorca sang about..."

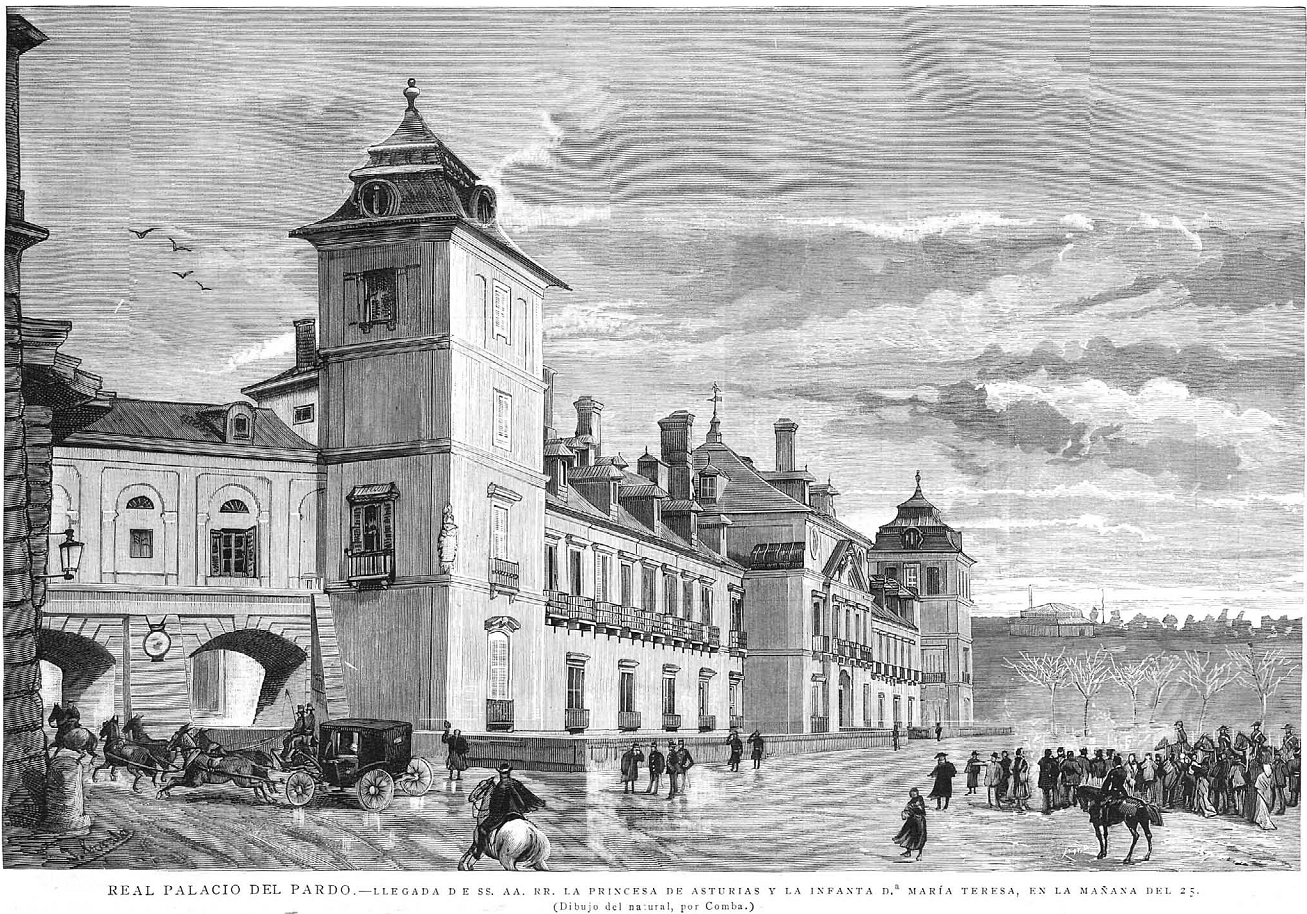

Francesco Sabatini
Pardo Palace, 1772

Building Madrid

Located northwest of Madrid, this former summer residence of the Spanish royal family was richly furnished with works of art; from 1940 it served as Franco's residence.

- AedW II, pp. 153–155
Description as a symbol of feudalism, occupied by the International Brigades during the Civil War.

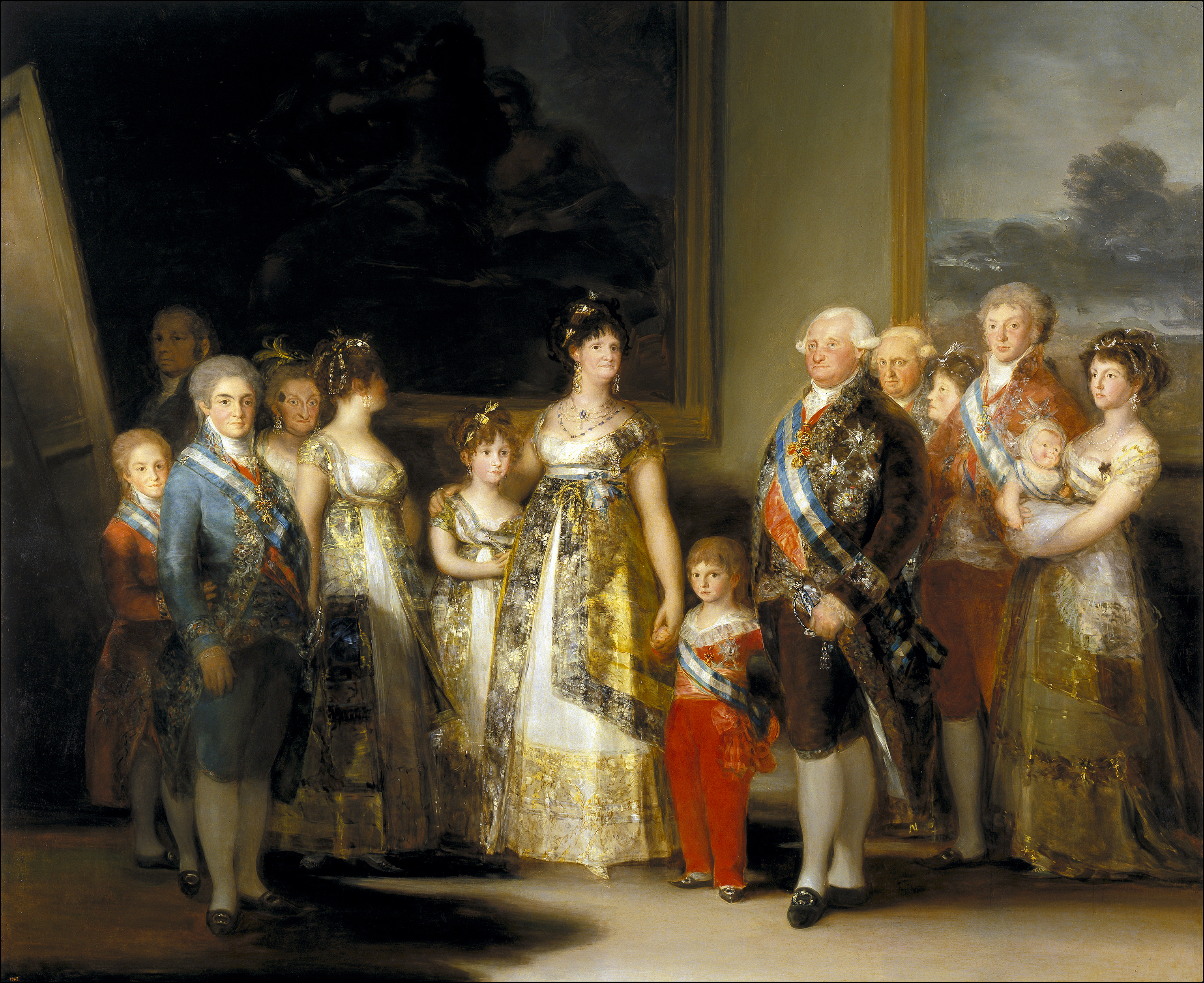

Francisco de Goya
Charles IV of Spain and His Family,1800-1801

Museo del Prado, Madrid

Fine arts

- AedW II, p. 155
Description of the painting with the question of the meaning of the client: "You know the picture (...) in which Goya captured the royal family, fourteen figures, bloated, witch-like, doll-like, stupid and fat, in glamorous robes, magnificent uniforms."

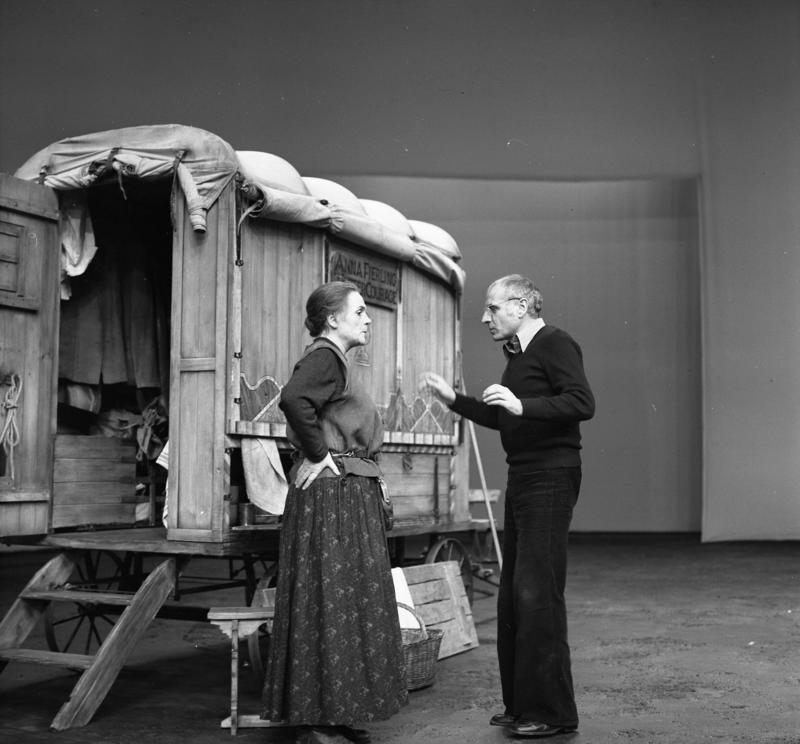

Bertolt Brecht
Mother Courage and Her Children,1938-1939

Drama

Literature

- AedW II, p. 176
Description of the work on the play by Brecht's working group.

Bertolt Brecht
Das Verhör des Lukullus (The Interrogation of Lucullus), 1940

Radio play

Literature

- AedW II, p. 177
Description of the work on the play by Brecht's working group.

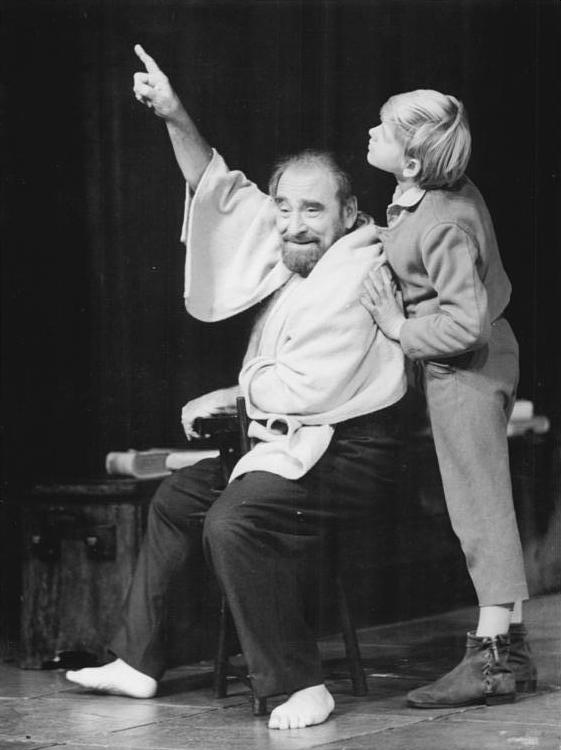

Bertolt Brecht

Leben des Galilei (The Life of Galileo), 1939 Drama

Literature

- AedW II, p. 177
Describing the problems of getting the play performed

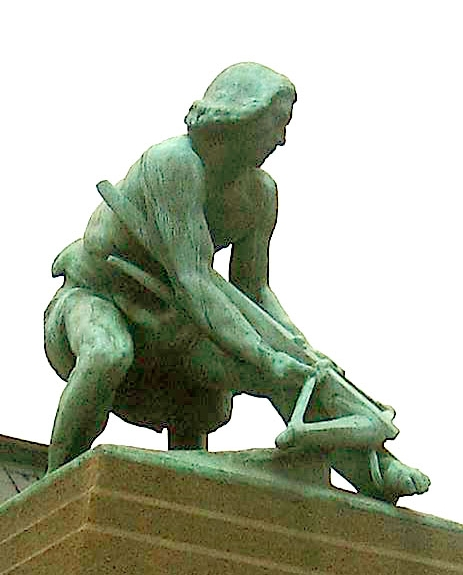

Background
Kornhamnstorg

Literature
The Engelbrekt Rebellion was a Swedish uprising against the Danish Union King Eric of Pomerania led by Engelbrekt Engelbrektsson in 1434-1436.

- AedW II, pp. 176f., 227ff. 306ff.
- Motif group: Resistance / Revolt
The Uprising was a material Brecht worked on for a time while he was in exile in Sweden, but eventually discarded. The first-person narrator takes up the story in his own literary development.

Bertold Brecht
Flüchtlingsgespräche (Refugee Talks), 1941-1949

Prose pieces

Literature

- AedW II, p. 214
Enumeration of Brecht's works

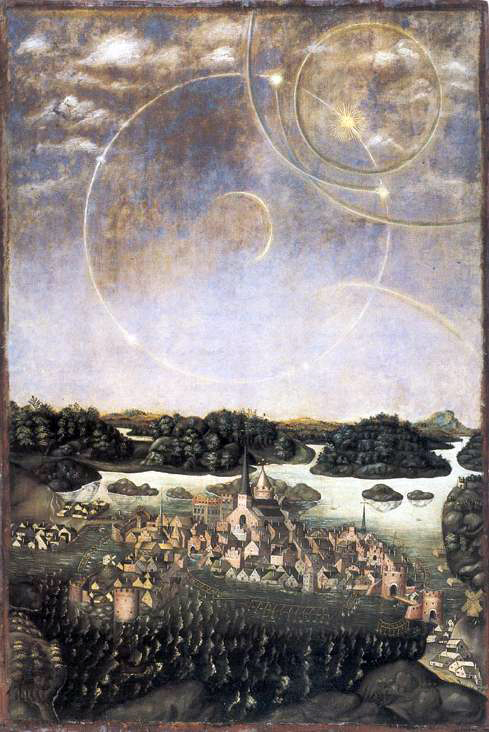

Jacob Elbfas

Painter

Vädersolstavlan, (Weather Sun Painting), around 1630

After a painting by Urban the Painter (1535) Storkyrkan, Stockholm

Fine arts The painting is the oldest known depiction of Stockholm and shows the halos observed on 20 April 1535.

- AedW II, p. 251
Description of the picture in connection with the account of the work of Brecht's working group on the Engelbrekt drama.

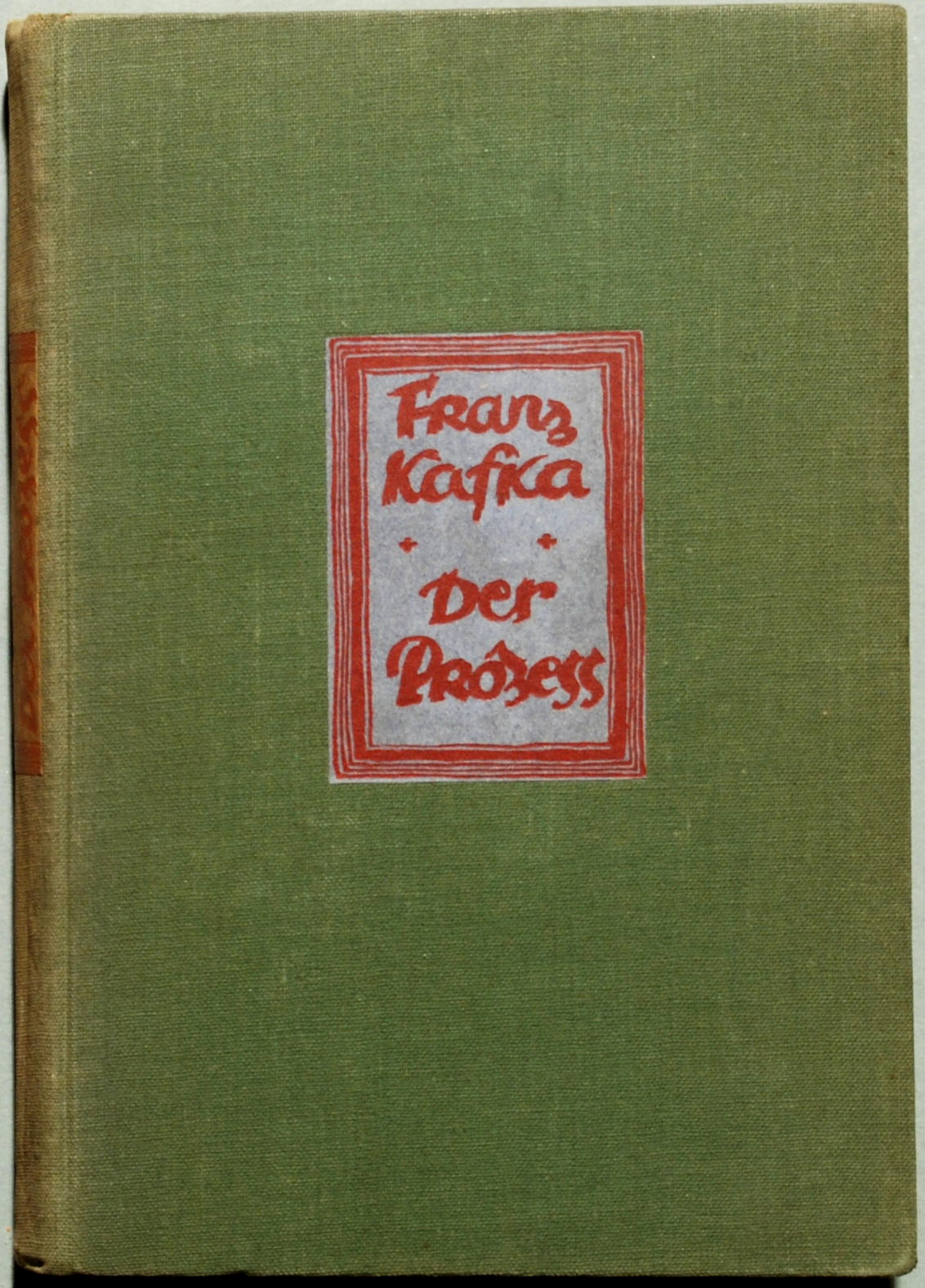

Franz Kafka
The Trial, 1914-1924 (1925)

Unfinished novel

Literature

- AedW II, p. 314

Listed in the extensive listing of Brecht's library in a chapter where the first-person narrator helps with packing:

"Brecht valued Kafka because he didn't care whether a book got its completion. (...) With the trial and the novel America in hand, (...) he said that actually only the fragment has the character of authenticity because it comes closest to the innermost function of producing".

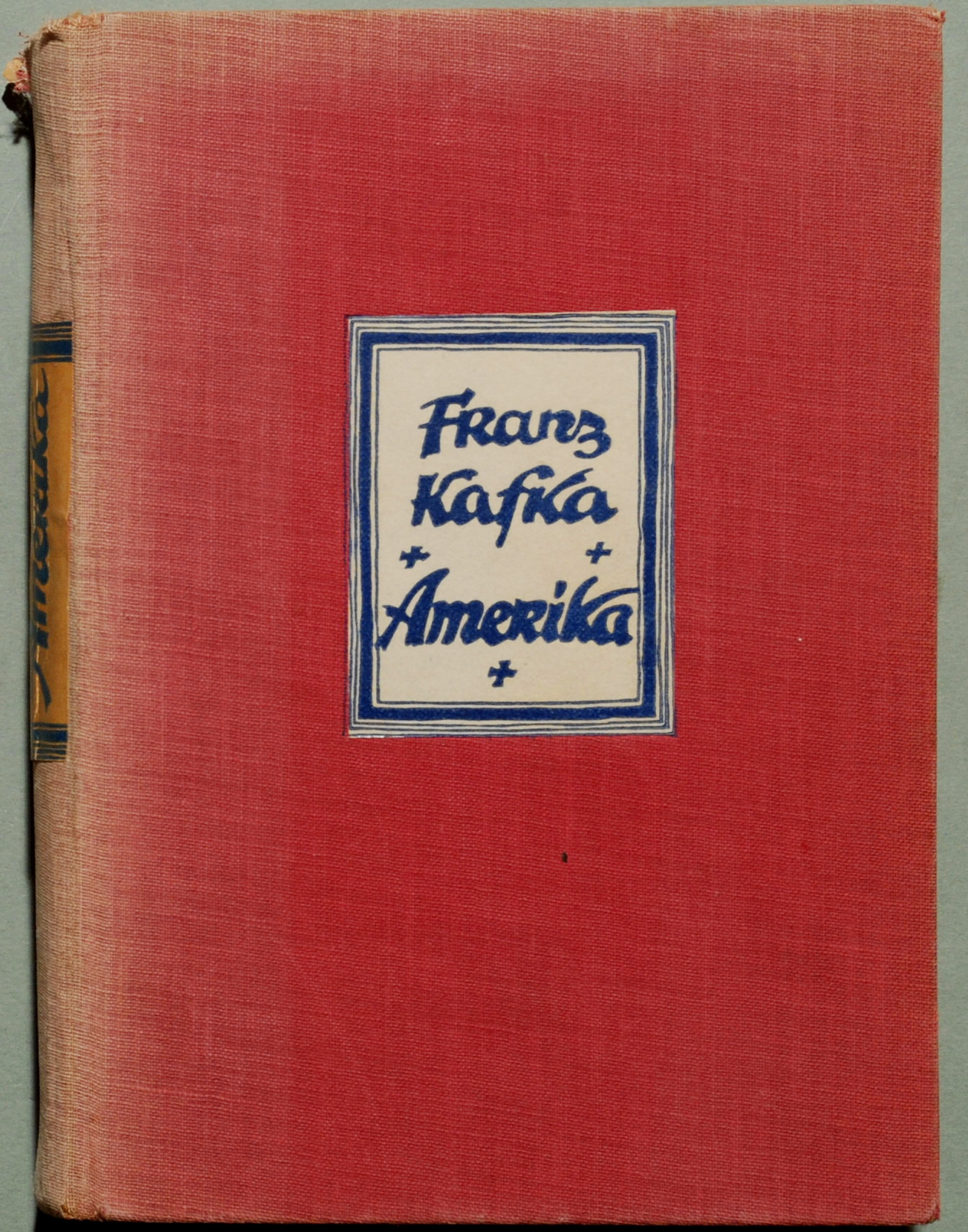

Franz Kafka
Amerika, 1911-1914 (1927)

Unfinished novel

Literature

- AedW II, p. 314
Listed in the extensive listing of Brecht's library in a chapter where the first-person narrator helps with packing:

"Brecht valued Kafka because he didn't care whether a book got its completion. (...) With the trial and the novel America in hand, (...) he said that actually only the fragment has the character of authenticity because it comes closest to the innermost function of producing".

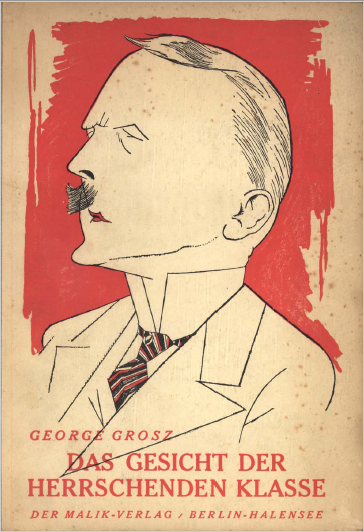

George Grosz
The Face of the Ruling Class, 1921,

cycle of 57 political drawings

Fine arts

- AedW II, p. 315
Listed in the extensive enumeration of Brecht's library in one chapter, in which the first-person narrator helps to pack.

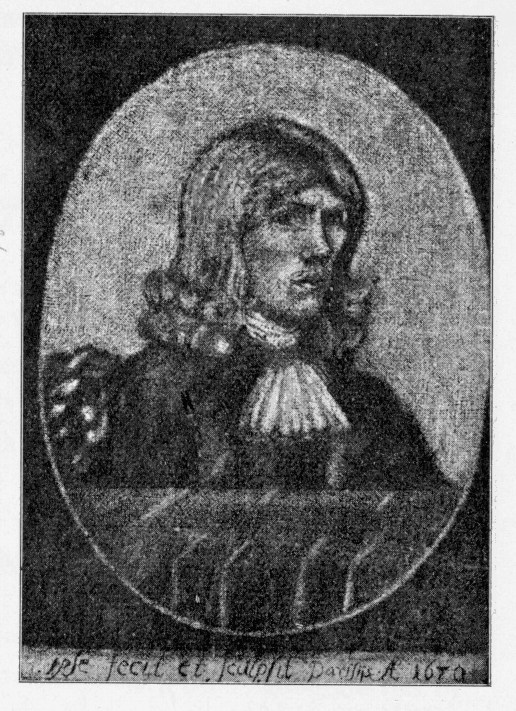

Urban Hjärne
Rosimunda, 1665

Play

Literature Rosimunda is a story based on the life and legend of the Lombard queen Rosimunda. She was the daughter of the Gepid king Kunimund and the second wife of the Lombard king Alboin, whom she had murdered on 28 June 572 or 573.

- AedW III, p. 19
Description of the poet's travels and his acting, while the first-person narrator digresses into thoughts of his own childhood in concern for his mother's health.

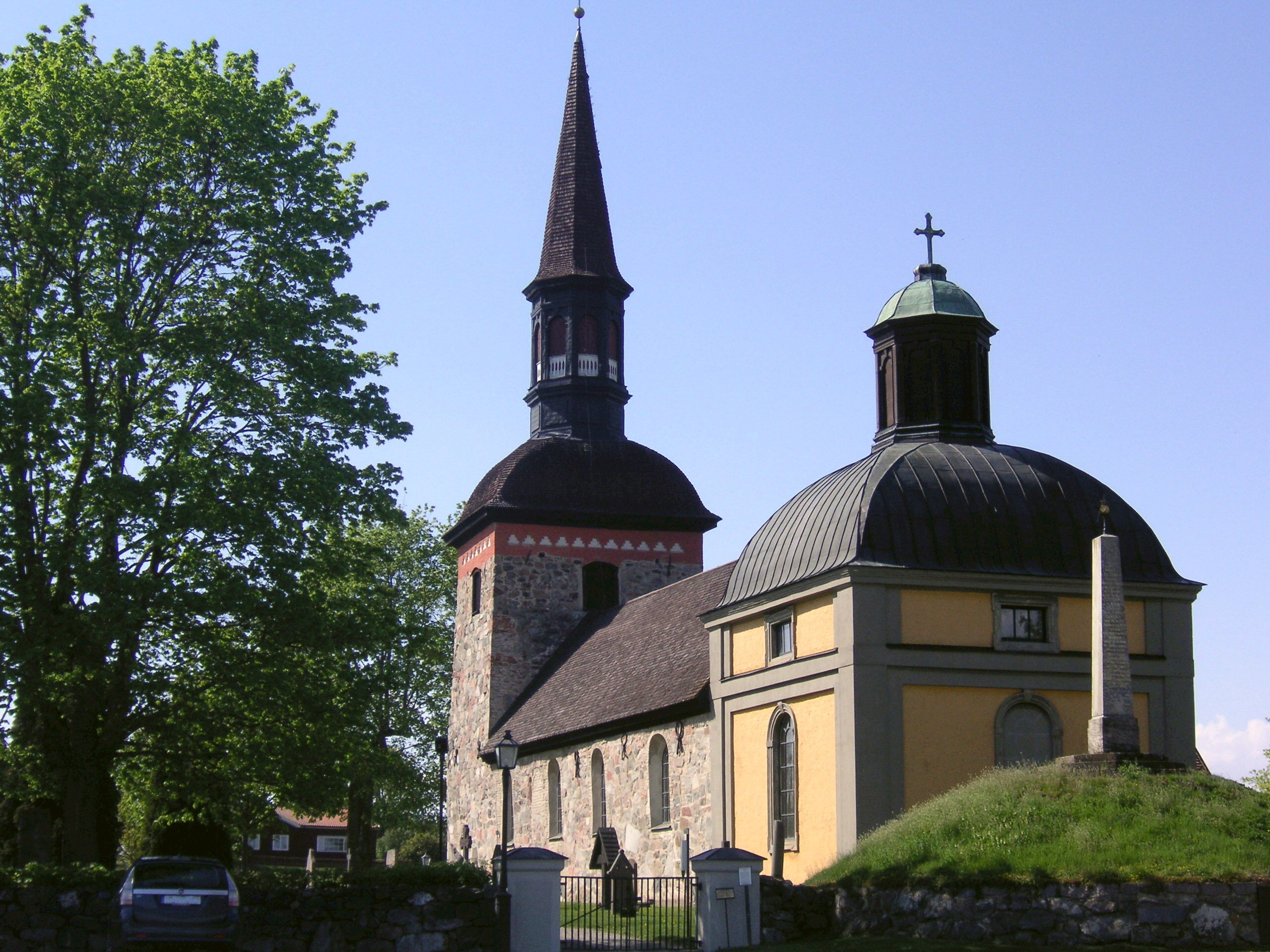

Middle Ages
Lovö kyrka, 12th and 13th century

church, Lovön near Stockholm

Building

- AedW III, pp. 66, 83f., 177
Depiction and description of some details from this medieval church in a scene in the novel where Lotte meets Bishop Herbert Wehner in this church.

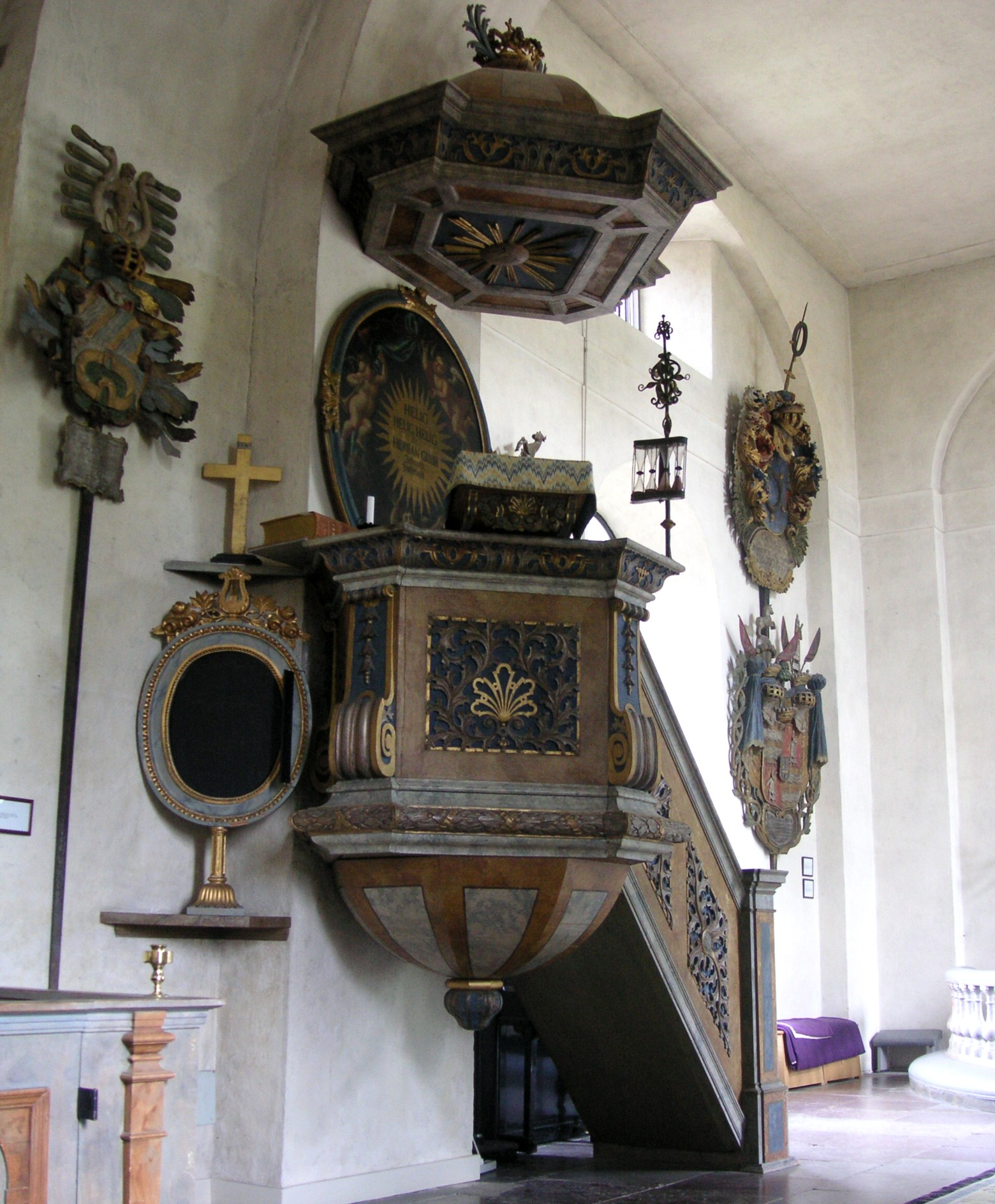

Burchard Precht
Pulpit in Lovö church, around 1700

Lovön near Stockholm

Visual arts

- AedW III, p. 84
Mentioned in a scene in the novel where Lotte meets Bishop Herbert Wehner in Lovö kyrka.

Johan Sylvius
The fresco in Lovö church, around 1690

Lovön near Stockholm

Visual arts

- AedW III, p. 84
Mentioned in a scene in the novel where Lotte meets Bishop Herbert Wehner in Lovö kyrka.

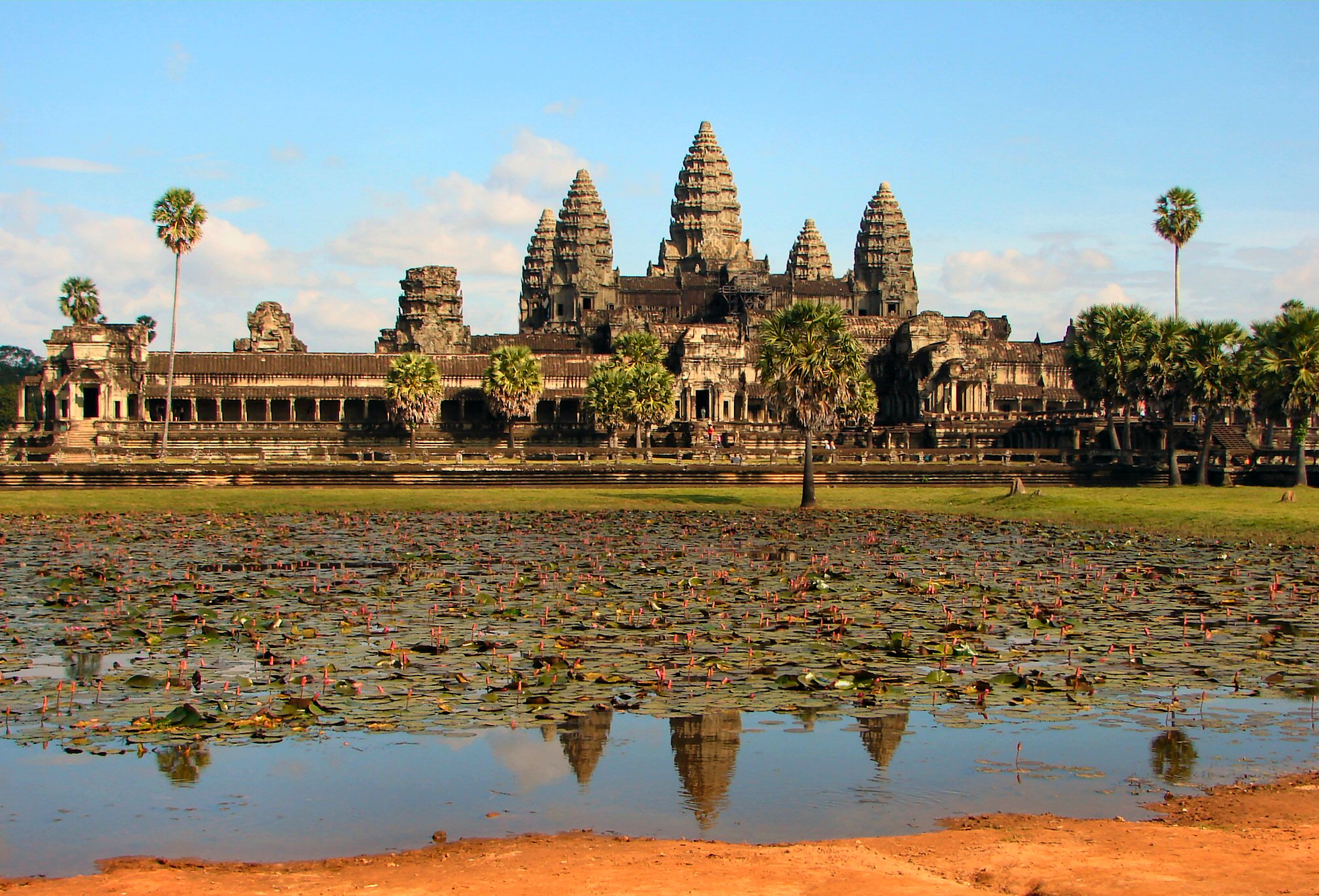

Suryavarman II
Angkor Wat, around 1300

Temples Angkor, Cambodia

Building Built under the reign of Suryavarman II, this is the largest sanctuary in Indochina and dedicated to the god Vishnu. Inside are colourful reliefs decorated with gold leaf, depicting historical battles and mythological scenes over 1088 square metres.

- AedW I 75, 352
- AedW III, pp. 97–109
The novel describes the relief of the South Gallery, The Royal Parade, which is used as the basis for an argument about the ruler's sense of power and the obedience demanded of him.

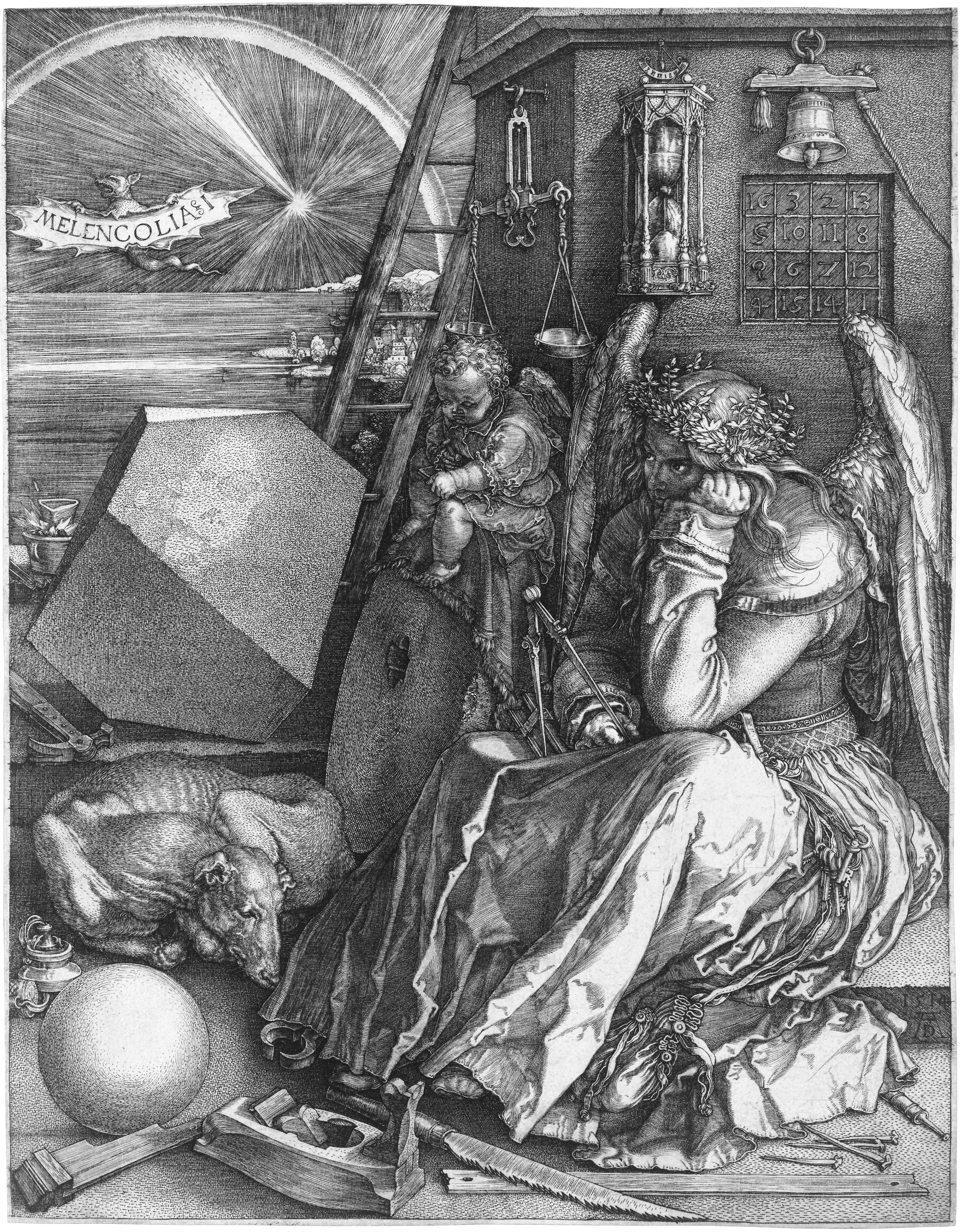

Albrecht Dürer
Melencolia I, 1514

Copper engraving

Fine Arts The Melencolia is one of Albrecht Dürer's three so-called master engravings; it is considered his most enigmatic work and is characterised by complex iconography and symbolism.

- AedW III, p. 132ff.
Description and interpretation of the print and placed by the first-person narrator in the context of his mother's illness: "Surrounded by things of research, building and ultimate exploration, she had emerged from a childlike existence, in her closed what seemed unfathomable to our thinking."

The painting already found mention in the first part of the novel, when it was juxtaposed with Dürer's print The Prodigal Son.

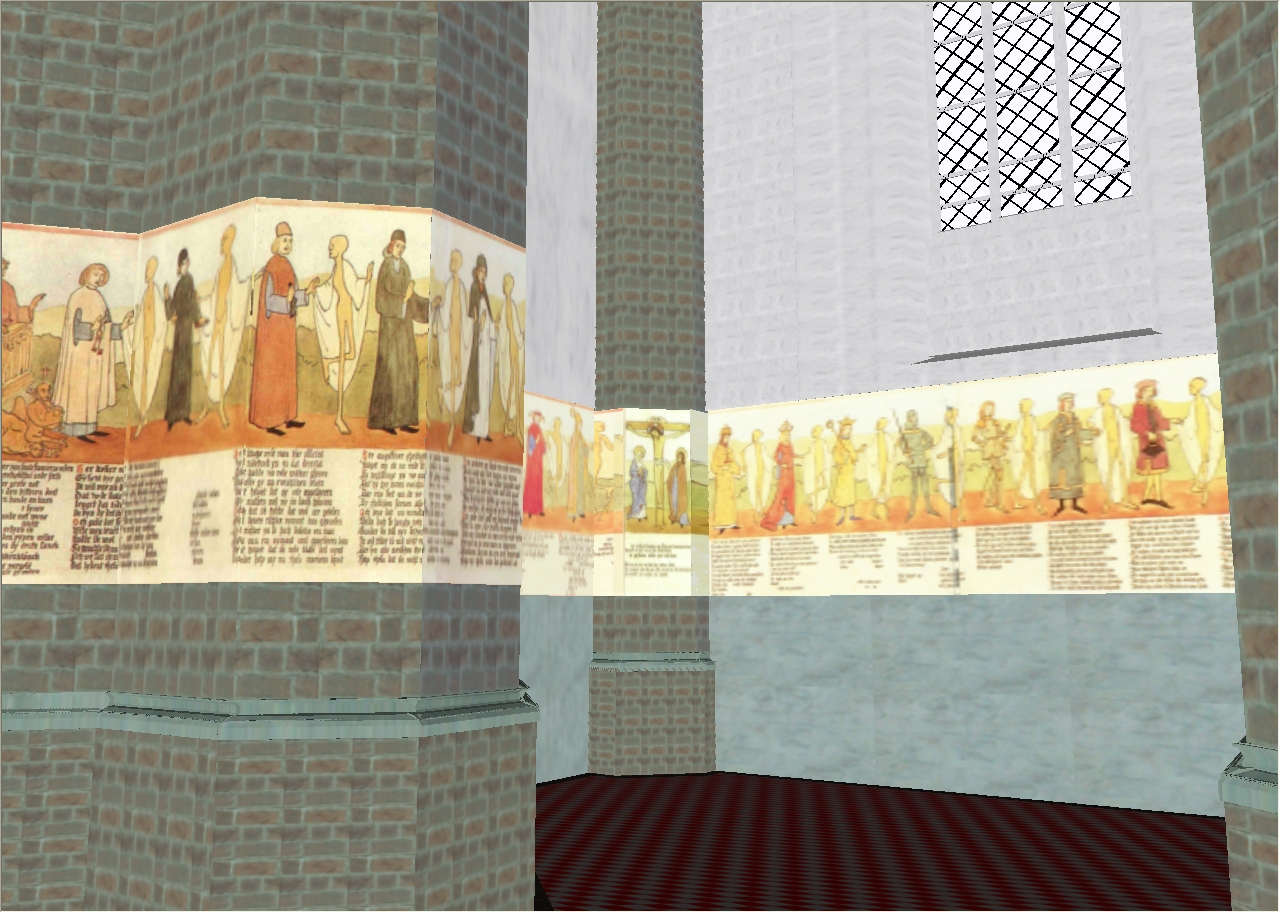

Middle Ages
Dance of Death, around 1500

Church of Our Lady, Berlin,

Fine Arts The Dance of Death fresco in the tower hall of the Marienkirche is one of the most important surviving medieval works of art in Berlin. On a length of 22.6 metres and a height of 2 metres, it shows a round dance of ecclesiastical and secular representatives of the estates, each with a figure of death.

- AedW III, pp. 169–171
Description in a scene in which the protagonists seek shelter from a bombing raid in the church, and emblematic of the following depiction of the execution and murder of resistance fighters in National Socialist Germany.

Background
Konstnärer i landsflykt, 1944

(Artist in Exile) Exhibition, Stockholm

Visual arts

- AedW I, p. 252
Description of the founding of a cultural association in Sweden, the organisation of an exhibition and a list of the artists involved.

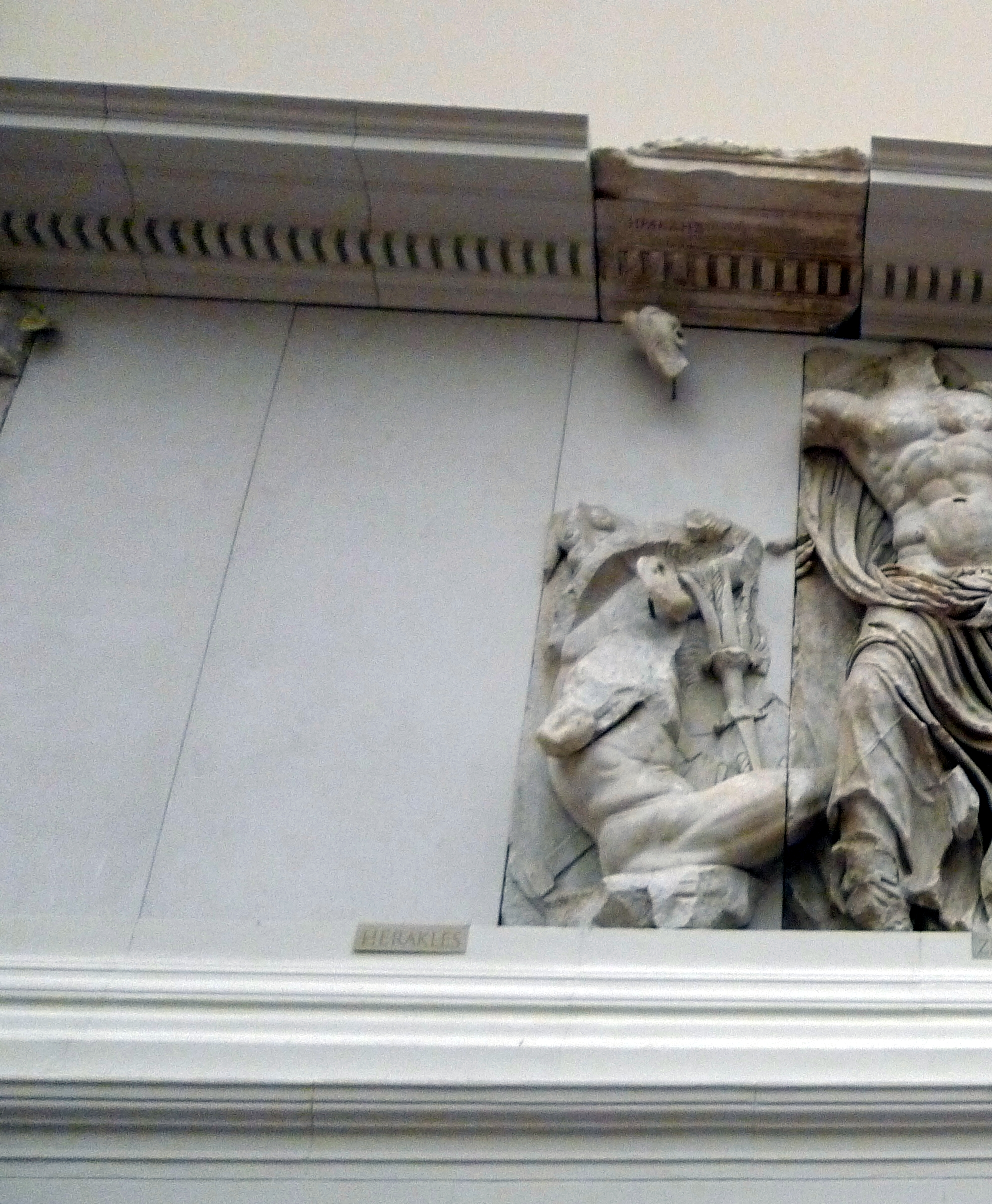

Ancient
The missing Heracles

Detail in the Pergamon Altar

Fine arts

- AedW III, p. 267f
The novel concludes:

"(...) and a place would be free in the crowd, the lion's paw would hang there, within everyone's reach, and as long as they did not let go of each other below, they would not see the paw of the lion's skin, and no one knowledgeable would come to fill the empty place, they themselves would have to become mighty of this single grip, this sweeping and swinging movement, with which they could at last sweep away the terrible pressure that weighed on them".

== See also ==
- Artists in The Aesthetics of Resistance

== Bibliography ==
- Badenberg, Nana (1995). "Die Ästhetik und ihre Kunstwerke. Eine Inventur". In Honold, Alexander; Schreiber, Ulrich; Badenberg, Nana (eds.). Die Bilderwelt des Peter Weiss (in German) (1st ed.). Hamburg: Argument-Verlag. pp. 114–163. ISBN 9783886192274.
- Badenberg, Nana (1995). "Kommentiertes Verzeichnis der in der Ästhetik des Wider-stands erwähnten bildenden Künstler und Kunstwerke". In Honold, Alexander; Schreiber, Ulrich (eds.). Die Bilderwelt des Peter Weiss (in German) (1st ed.). Hamburg: Argument-Verlag. pp. 163–231. ISBN 9783886192274.
- Weiss, Peter (1987). Die Ästhetik des Widerstands Bd. 1 (in German) (2nd ed.). Berlin: Henschelverlag Kunst und Gesellschaft. ISBN 9783362001854.
- Weiss, Peter (1988). Aesthetik des Widerstands. Edition Suhrkamp, 1501 (in German). Vol. II. Frankfurt: Suhrkamp. ISBN 9783518115015. OCLC 1283249147.
- Weiss, Peter (1987). Die Ästhetik des Widerstands Bd. 3 (in German) (2nd ed.). Berlin: Henschelverlag Kunst und Gesellschaft. ISBN 3362001874.
