= Venus and Adonis (Poussin) =

C.1626 painting by Nicolas Poussin

- Vénus et Adonis (French)
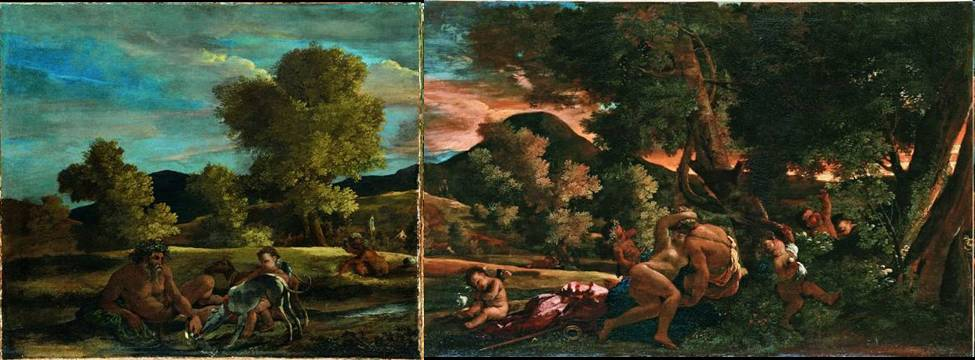
- The reunited painting
- Artist: Nicolas Poussin
- Year: c. 1626
- Medium: Oil on canvas
- Dimensions: 77 cm × 200 cm (30 in × 79 in)
- Location: Musée Fabre, Montpellier

Venus and Adonis or View of Grottaferrata with Venus, Adonis and a River Divinity is an oil-on-canvas painting executed c.1626 by the French artist Nicolas Poussin. It is held in the Musée Fabre, in Montpellier.

It was cut in two in the 18th century, with the larger right-hand part entering the Musée Fabre in 1825 through François-Xavier Fabre. The left part ended up with the Patti Birch Trust by 1991, on long-term loan to the Metropolitan Museum of Art. Both halves were displayed together at the Metropolitan and then the Musée Fabre in 2008. At the end of 2009 the Montpellier Agglomération (guardian of the Musée Fabre) used two private donations to purchase the left hand part and thus reunite the painting. The complete painting was then exhibited at Nature et idéal: Le paysage à Rome 1600-1650, a 2011 exhibition in the Grand Palais in Paris.

The painting depicts Venus seducing Adonis under a tree surrounded by putti. To the left a river god pours out a drink for a greyhound. The episode was to end in tragedy when Adonis is gored by a wild boar when hunting the following day, as Venus had fearfully predicted. Her discovery of his dead body was portrayed in Poussin's later work Venus Weeping for Adonis.

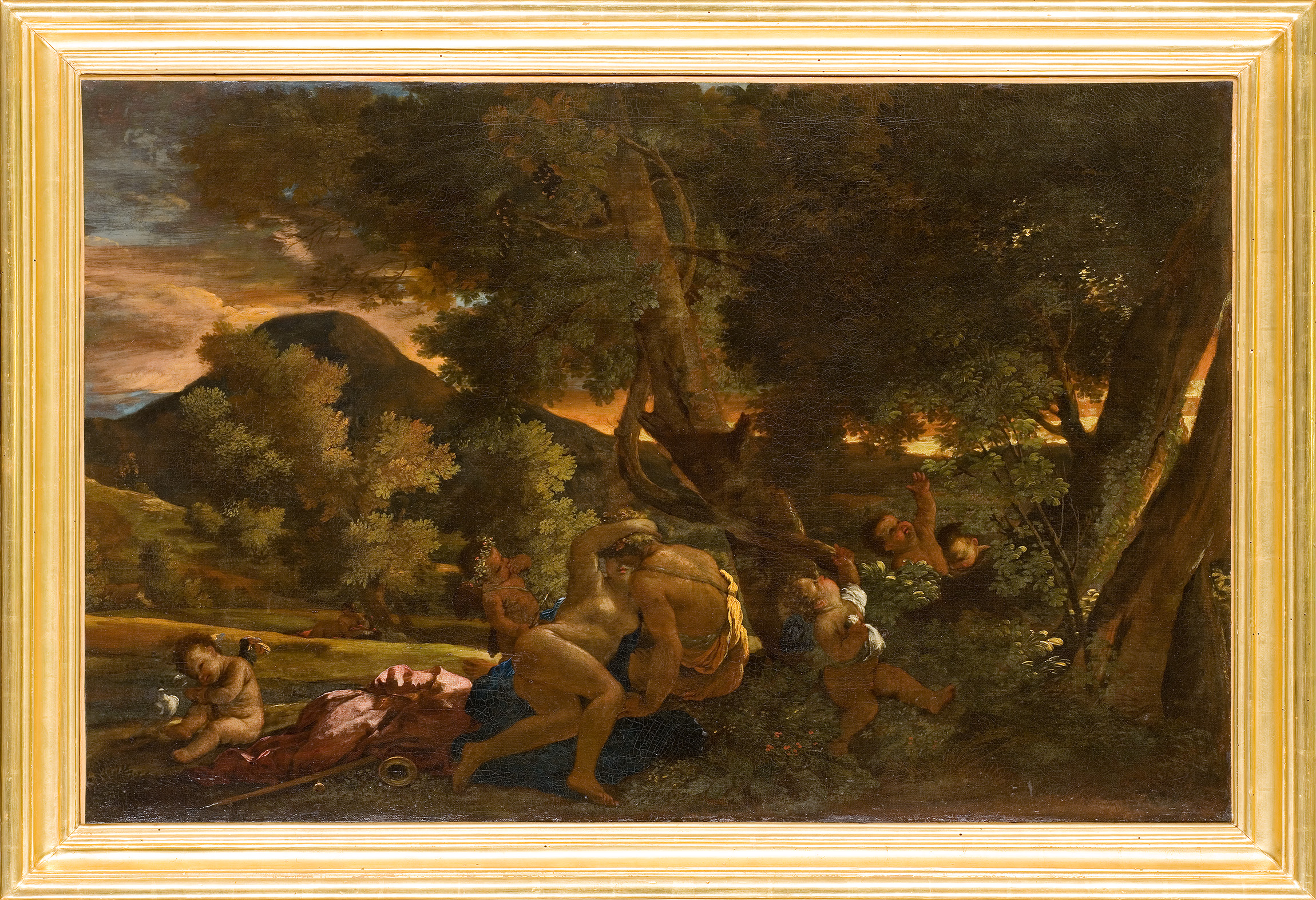
Museum photo pre-reconstruction in 2010

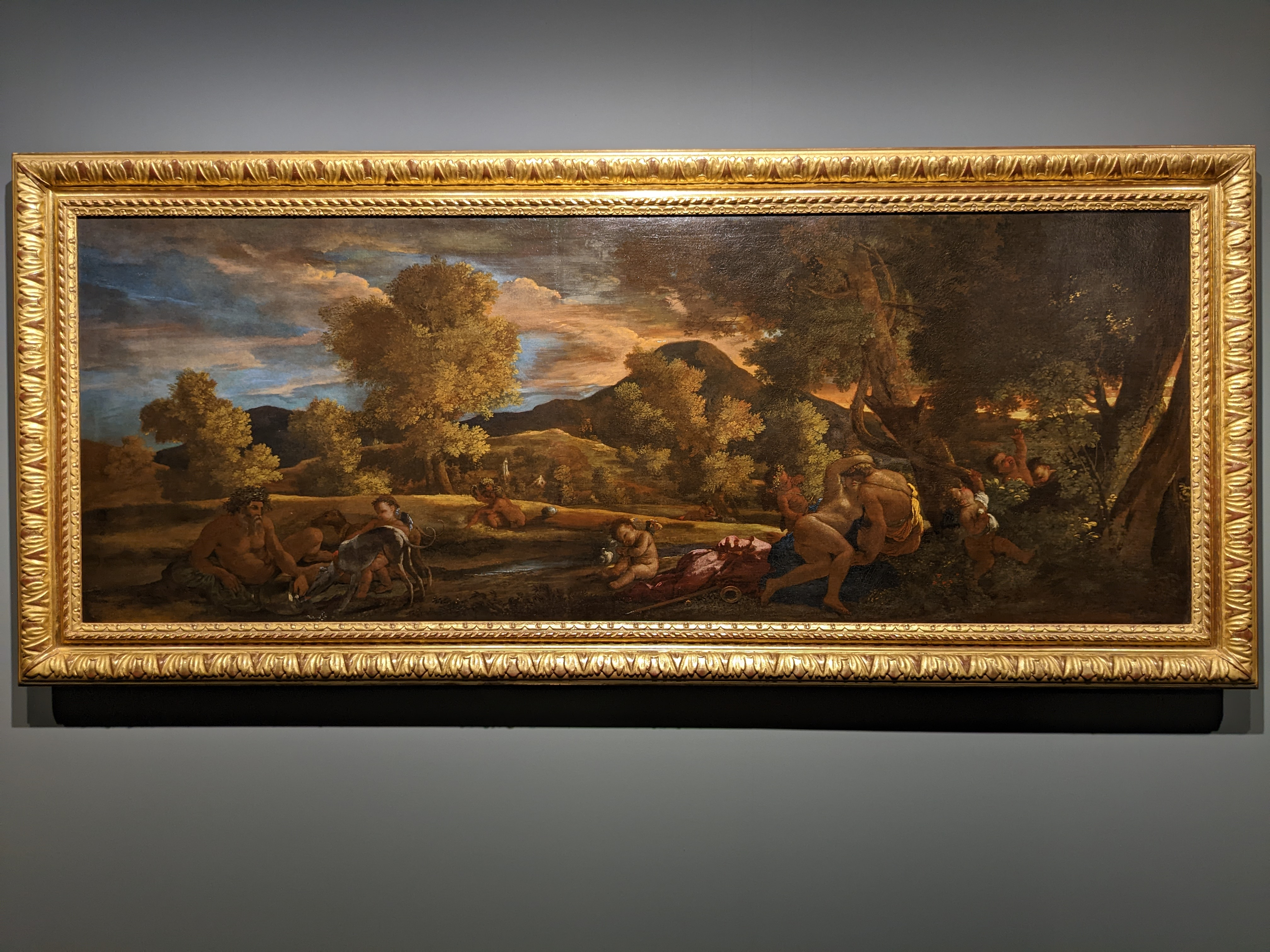
Photo post-restoration & reconstruction

== See also ==
- List of paintings by Nicolas Poussin
