= Landscape with Three Figures =

Painting by Nicolas Poussin

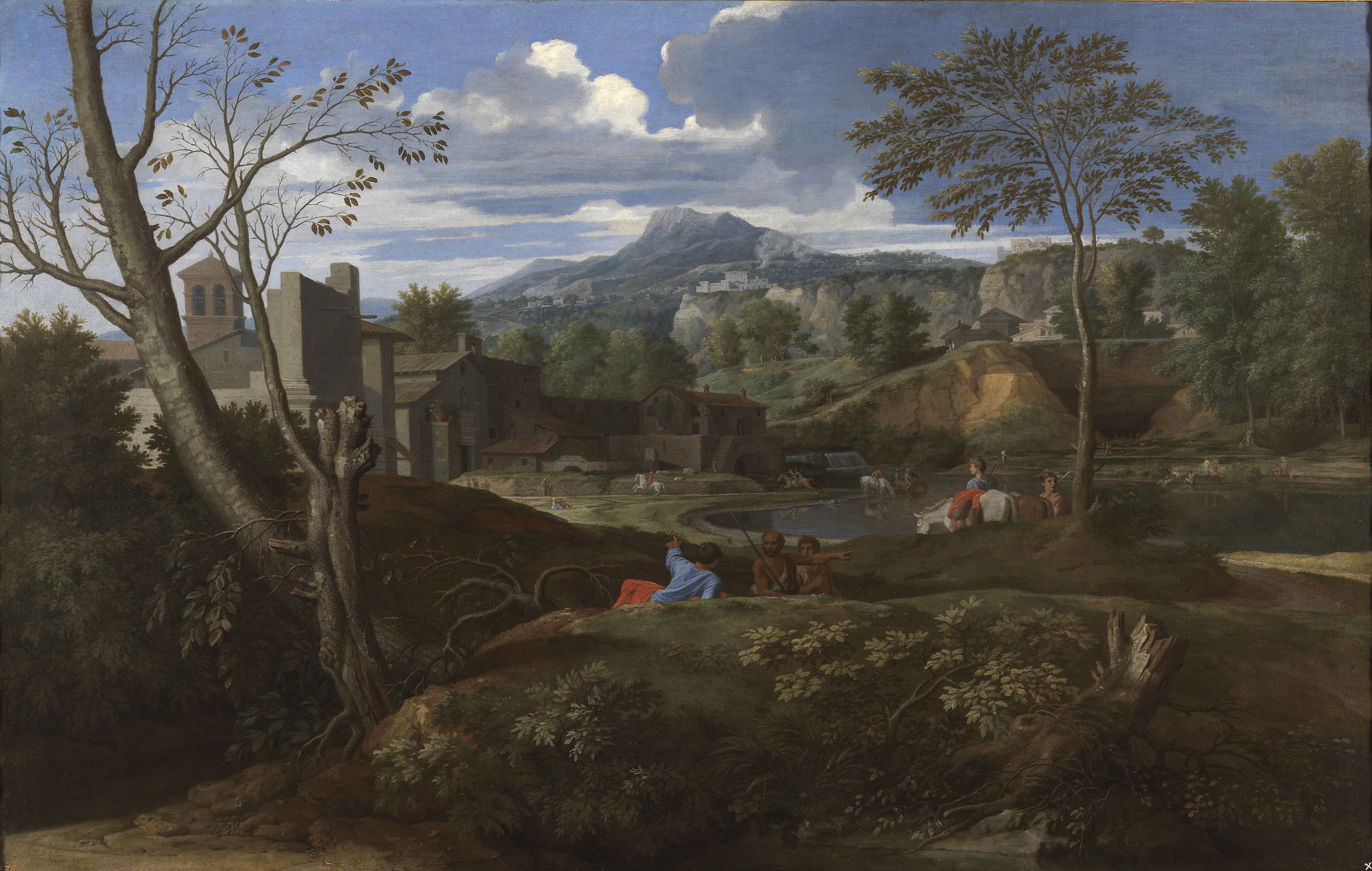
Landscape with Three Figures (c. 1645–1650) by Nicolas Poussin

Landscape with Three Figures is an oil on canvas painting by Nicolas Poussin, from c. 1645–1650. It is held now in the Museo del Prado, in Madrid.

== History and description ==
The painting depicts a bucholic landscape, where the three main human figures represented appear to be of minimal importance, while others are also visible. Poussin approached this genre late in his career, from 1648 onwards, as it was not highly valued within the academic circles nor was it part of the classical genres. In this painting its noticeable the achievements of 17th century painting in terms of reaching a landscape where the atmosphere "is a kind of substance of space, which can fill the whole painting, making it a unit."

== See also ==
- List of paintings by Nicolas Poussin
