= Extreme Unction (Poussin) =

Painting by Nicolas Poussin

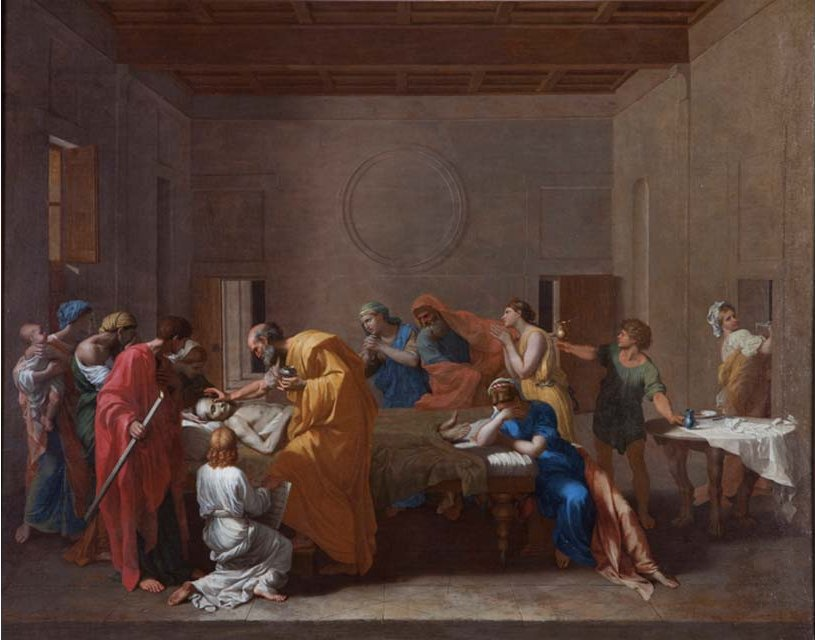
- Artist: Nicolas Poussin
- Year: 1638–1640
- Medium: Oil on canvas
- Location: Fitzwilliam Museum, Cambridge

Extreme Unction (or Final Anointing) is one of a set of seven scenes representing the sacraments of the Catholic Church, painted between 1638 and 1640 by the French artist Nicolas Poussin (1594–1665).

Commissioned in Rome by the renowned connoisseur Cassiano dal Pozzo, the scene depicts a dying man being anointed with oil in accordance with the rites of the early Roman church. Drawing on his extensive study of the art and artefacts of classical antiquity, Poussin reproduced the costumes, setting, composition, and frieze-like posture of the figures, thereby heightening the realism of the scene. This classicising tendency went on to make an inestimable impact on Western art, influencing many of the greatest painters of subsequent generations, from Jacques-Louis David and Ingres to Cézanne and Picasso. To this day, artists continue to be inspired by Poussin’s work and ideas about painting.

In treating themes of death and dying, Poussin revealed himself at his most ambitious, consciously pitting himself against no less an artist than the ancient Greek painter Apelles who was, Poussin wrote, "[much] pleased ... to represent scenes of death." Today, the sobriety and control of Poussin's paintings can seem difficult, or remote, to audiences. But in Extreme Unction subject and style are so perfectly aligned that Poussin's stark, lyrical, line, and controlled play of light and shadow bring out the full depth of emotion that marks this momentous scene.

Death remains one of the last great taboos in much of the developed world. Poussin's painting addresses with potency and directness the universal message of human mortality: through the rhythmic beauty of the compositional line and passages of resplendent, even joyous, colour, Poussin allows us to contemplate and engage with the most natural and inevitable of events in human existence.

== Poussin, England, and the Rutland Sacraments ==
Poussin initially painted for a relatively small, but hugely enthusiastic, group of patrons, but by the 18th century collectors throughout Europe were clamouring to buy his pictures. Lord Fitzwilliam was one, though later scholarship proved that his would-be Poussin was a copy. The Duke of Rutland was more fortunate, and his purchase in 1785 of Poussin’s series of Seven Sacraments – then among the most his important works to be seen in Rome – caused a sensation in England. Their acquisition was heralded as a coup for the nation, and when the series was exhibited at the Royal Academy it was visited by King George III himself.

== Acquisition by the Fitzwilliam Museum ==
The set of Sacraments is no longer complete: one, Penance, was destroyed by fire in 1816, Baptism was sold around 1939 and is now in the National Gallery of Art, Washington, and Ordination was sold in 2011 to the Kimbell Art Museum, Fort Worth, Texas. As a result of this last sale, and consequent Inheritance Tax, the Fitzwilliam Museum was offered through H.M. Government's Acceptance in Lieu scheme the unique opportunity to purchase the painting for £3.9 million from the Trustees of the 11th Duke of Rutland 2000 Settlement, a fraction of its agreed value, £14,000,000. Dr Stephen Deuchar (Art Fund Director) described the acquisition for the Fitzwilliam Museum as the most important Old Master painting to enter the Museum for almost a century.

== See also ==
- List of paintings by Nicolas Poussin
