= The Martyrdom of St Erasmus =

The Martyrdom of Saint Erasmus can refer to:

- The Martyrdom of Saint Erasmus (Bouts)
- The Martyrdom of Saint Erasmus (Poussin)
