= Blind Orion Searching for the Rising Sun =

Painting by Nicolas Poussin

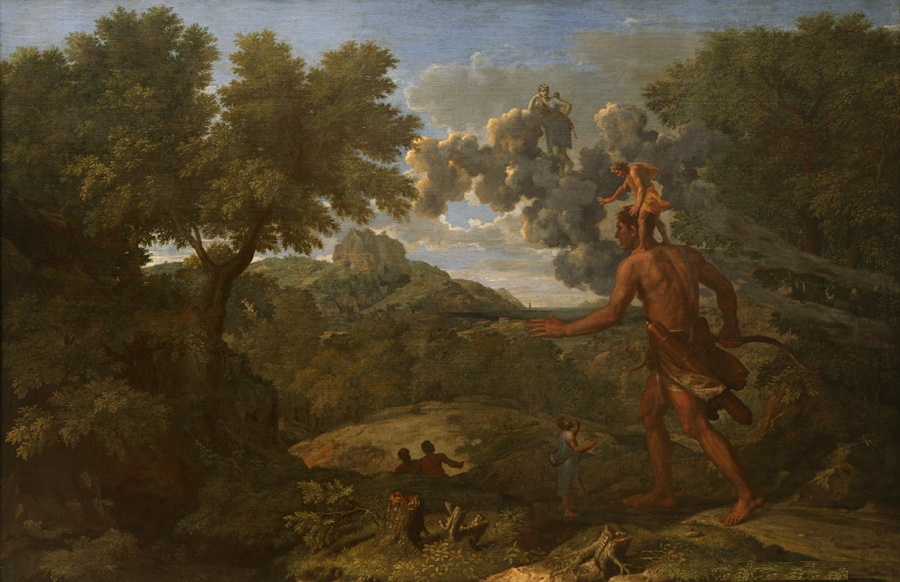
- Artist: Nicolas Poussin
- Year: 1658
- Medium: Oil on canvas
- Dimensions: 119.1 cm × 182.9 cm (46.9 in × 72.0 in)
- Location: Metropolitan Museum of Art, New York
- Accession: 24.45.1

Blind Orion Searching for the Rising Sun is a 1658 painting by French artist Nicolas Poussin. Done in oil on canvas, the painting depicts a scene in which the mythological figure Orion — having been blinded — searches for the rising sun.

The painting's scene was inspired by the 2nd century CE Syrian writer Lucian's retellings and spoofs on Greek mythology, including the Orion legend. Poussin painted Blind Orion on behalf of Michel Passart, a well-known patron of landscape painting. Poussin's work is in the collection of the Metropolitan Museum of Art, which considers the work one of Poussin's greatest landscape paintings.

== See also ==
- List of paintings by Nicolas Poussin
