= Landscape with Two Nymphs =

Painting by Nicolas Poussin

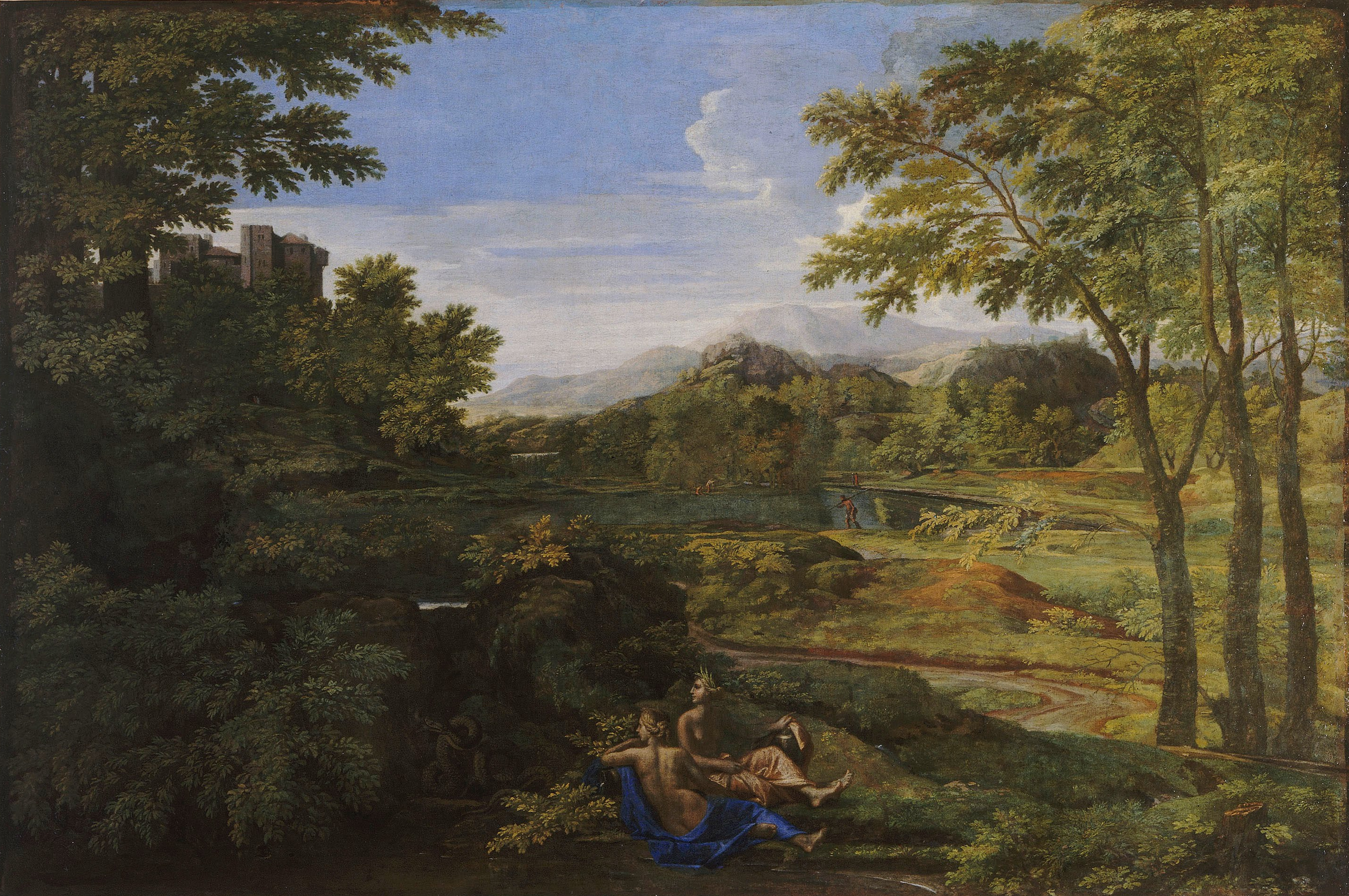
Landscape with Two Nymphs (c. 1659) by Nicolas Poussin

Landscape with Two Nymphs (Paysage aux deux nymphes) is a c.1659 oil-on-canvas painting by the French artist Nicolas Poussin. The painting is in the collection of Musée Condé of the Château de Chantilly in Chantilly, France.

A late work, it seems to have been painted for Charles Le Brun, another painter. It was sold from the Radziwiłł collection in 1866 to Frédéric Reiset, a curator at the Louvre. Reiset sold it with the rest of his collection to Henri d'Orleans, Duke of Aumale in 1879 and so the work is now in the Musée Condé.

== See also ==
- List of paintings by Nicolas Poussin
