= Saint Cecilia (Poussin) =

Painting by Nicolas Poussin

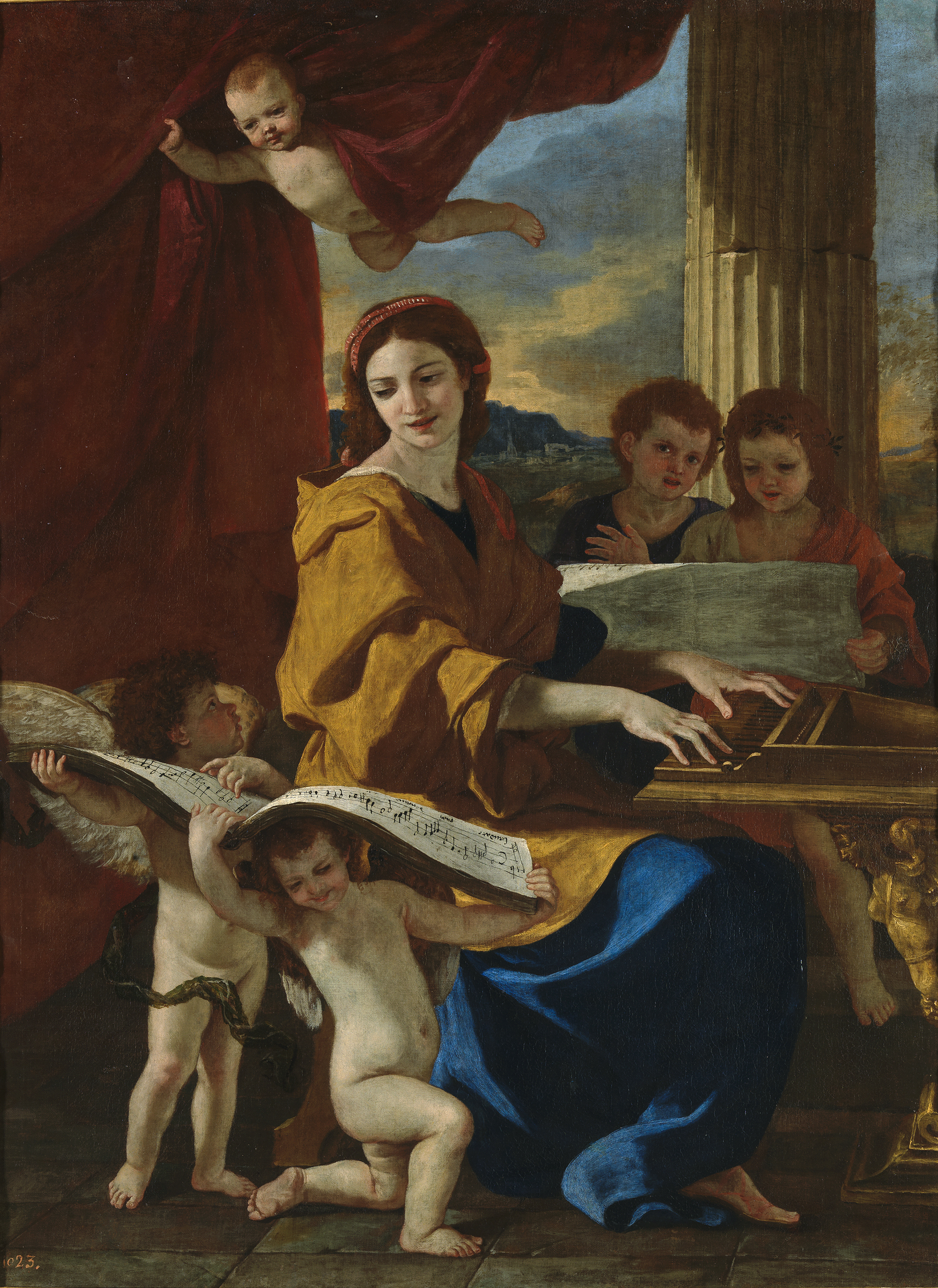
Saint Cecilia (1627–1628) by Nicolas Poussin

Saint Cecilia is a painting by Nicolas Poussin, from 1627 to 1628. It is held in the Prado Museum, in Madrid. It depicts Saint Cecilia playing a keyboard instrument, possibly a harpsichord. Two cherubs in front of her hold up a scroll with a musical score, whilst two angels sing in the background and a third cherub lifts a curtain.

== See also ==
- List of paintings by Nicolas Poussin
