= Echo and Narcissus (Poussin) =

Painting by Nicolas Poussin

- Écho et Narcisse
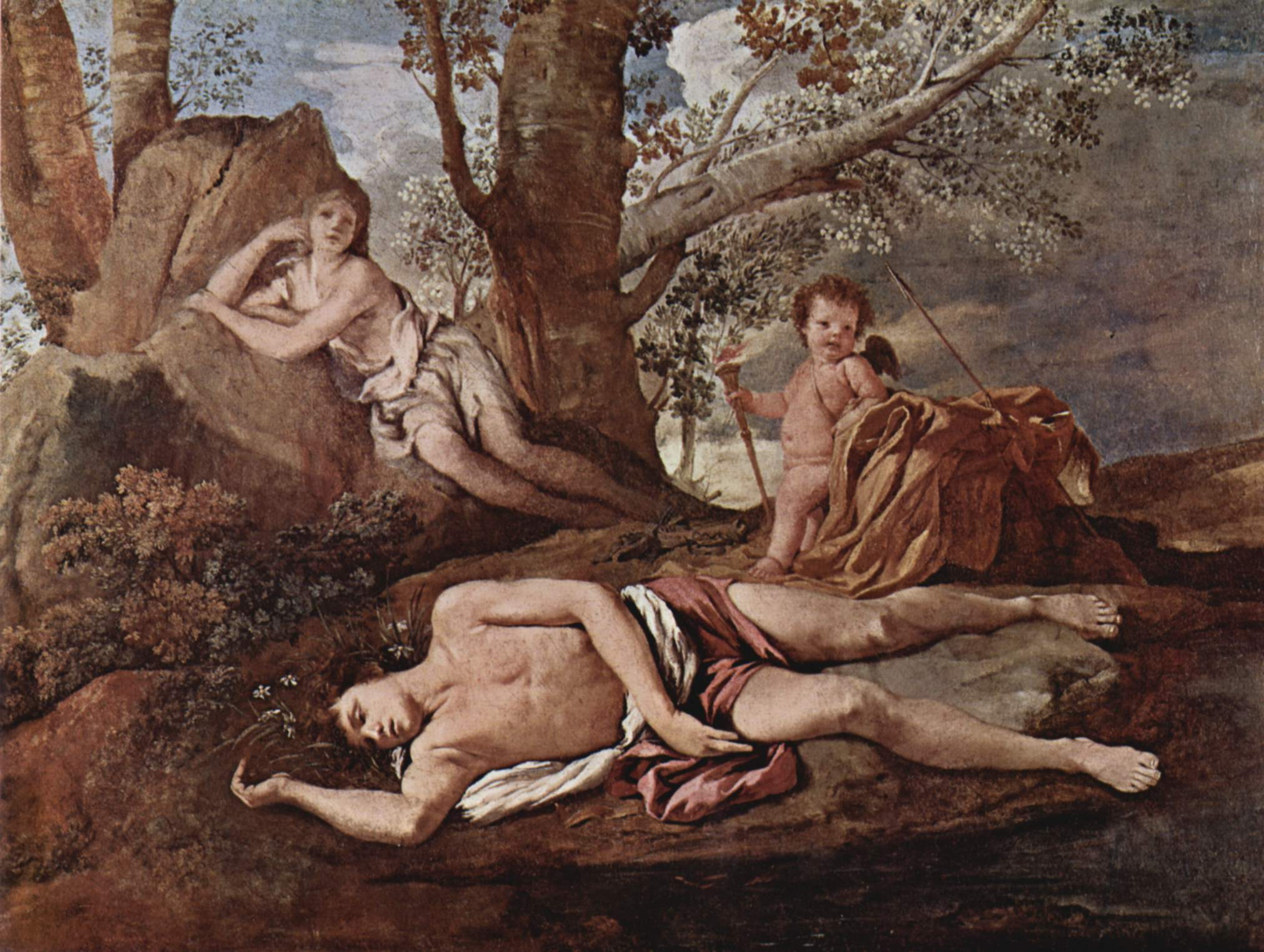
- Artist: Nicolas Poussin
- Year: 1627
- Medium: oil on canvas
- Dimensions: 74 cm × 100 cm (29 in × 39 in)
- Location: Louvre, Paris

Echo and Narcissus is an oil painting by French artist Nicolas Poussin, from 1627-1628. It measures 74 by 100 cm (29 by 39 in) and is held in the Louvre, in Paris.

== The myth ==
The work derives from Greek Mythology. According to Ovid's Metamorphoses, the nymph Echo fell in love with Narcissus, but he rejected her. Nemesis, the goddess of vengeance, punished Narcissus by making him fall in love with his own reflection. At the place where he died grew the flower that bears his name: Narcissus.

== The painting ==
Poussin illustrates this myth by representing three characters in an idyllic landscape: in the foreground, Narcissus, lying down; behind him, on the right, Eros, god of love; and on the left, sitting on a rock, Echo. Around the hair of the dead young Narcissus are already blooming flowers to which he gave his name. Echo, leaning on a rock, seems "an elegiac and immaterial apparition".

== See also ==
- List of paintings by Nicolas Poussin
