= Cephalus and Aurora (Poussin) =

Two paintings by Nicolas Poussin

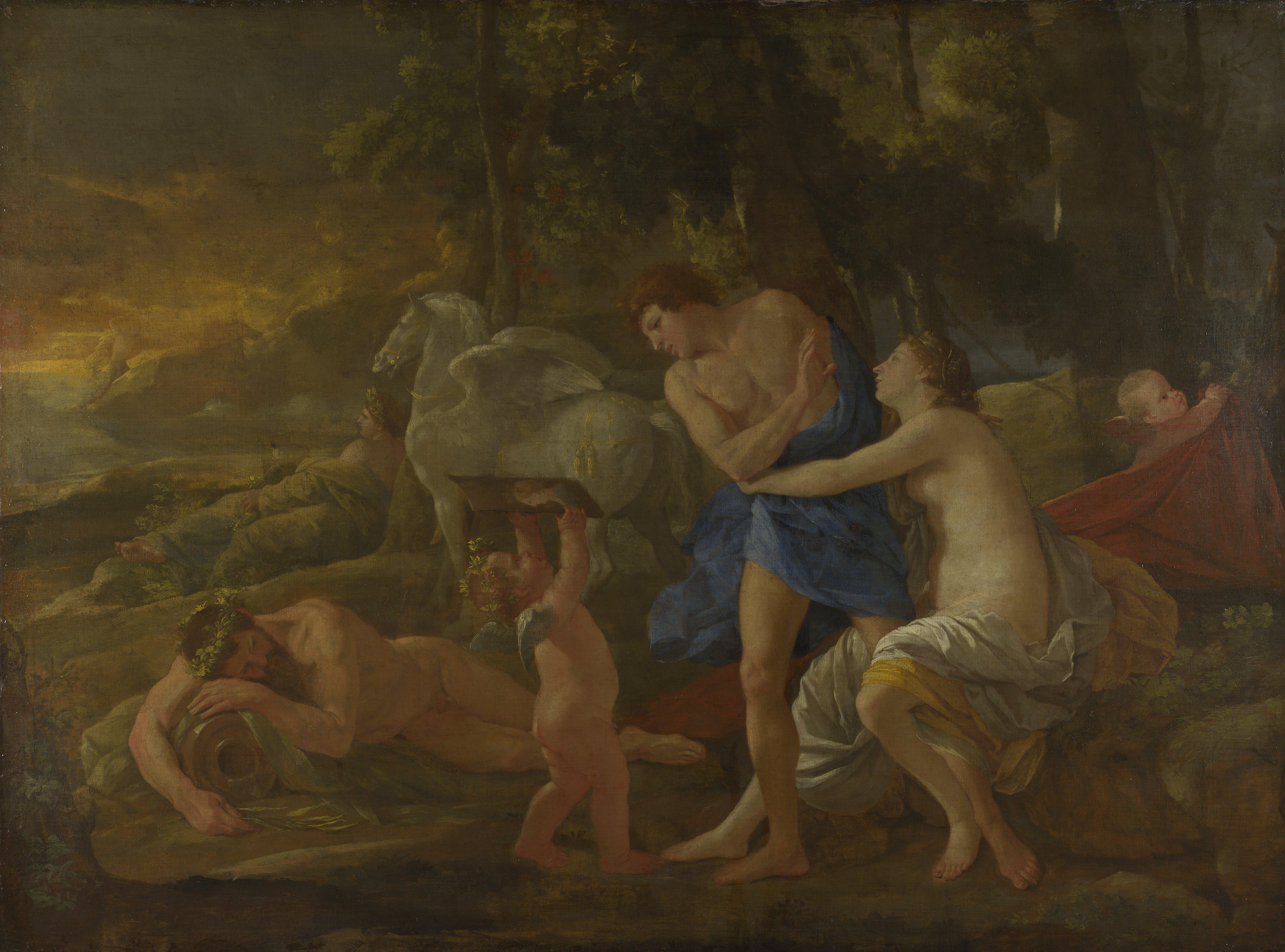
The picture in London, oil on canvas, 96.9 x 131.3 cm

Cephalus and Aurora is the title of two oil paintings by Nicolas Poussin, both dated to about 1629 or 1630. The first is in the National Gallery, London; the second belongs to the Worsley baronets, of Hovingham Hall, Yorkshire.

== National Gallery picture ==
Aurora, the lovely precursor of morning, who "opens with her rosy fingers the gates of the east", is seen seated on a bank on the confines of a grove, with her arms round the waist of her beloved Cephalus: this tender restraint on his departure, is seconded by a sweet smile beaming in her upraised countenance; but although he feels the gentle pressure, and makes no effort to escape from it, he dares not trust his eyes to behold her charms, but turns to gaze on the portrait of his absent Procris, held to his view by the young god of love. (Note: Smith (1837) comments, "[T]his sentiment is powerfully expressed by the bending forward of his body, and the position of his raised hand, and the portrait presented by Love is a beautiful allusion to the image of her who dwells in his heart, and has now possession of his thoughts.") A second cupid is behind Aurora, unveiling her charms, so that her only covering is a white vesture round her loins.

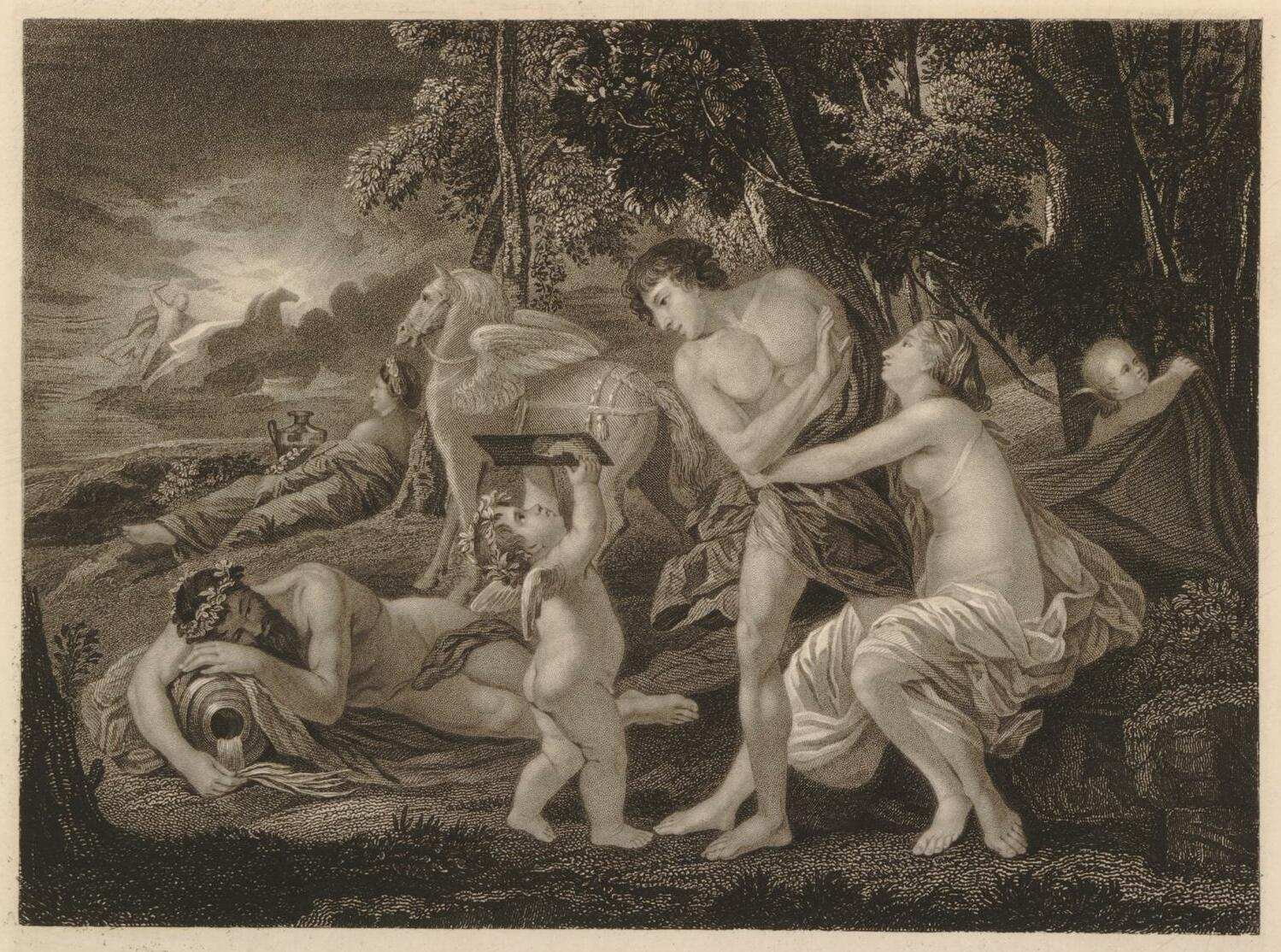
Print by W. Holl, 21 x 29.3 cm

On the opposite side of the picture is a river deity, (Note: Sometimes identified as either Oceanus or Tithonus.) reclining asleep on a streaming vase gently flowing rivulets which water the earth; beyond him stands a winged white horse, styled by some writers Pegasus, attached to a car, but the latter is nearly concealed by trees; still more remote is seen a naiade recumbent on a bank, apparently just rising from her dewy couch, and beholding in the eastern hemisphere, "Phoebus urging onward his fiery coursers and launching his streams of light through the dewy moisture of the morning"; a signal for the Thessalian prince to commence his rural sports.

Engraved in the National Gallery by William Holl the Younger.

Smith (1837) comments, "This elegant classical allegory is here exemplified by the pencil of Poussin with the genius both of a poet and painter."

- Collection of John Knight, Esq. (Phillips), 1819, (bought in) 720 gns.
- Collection of John Knight, Esq. (Phillips), 1821, (bought in) 690 gns.
- Bought by G. J. Cholmondeley, Esq., and bequeathed by him, in 1831, to the National Gallery.

== Hovingham Hall picture ==
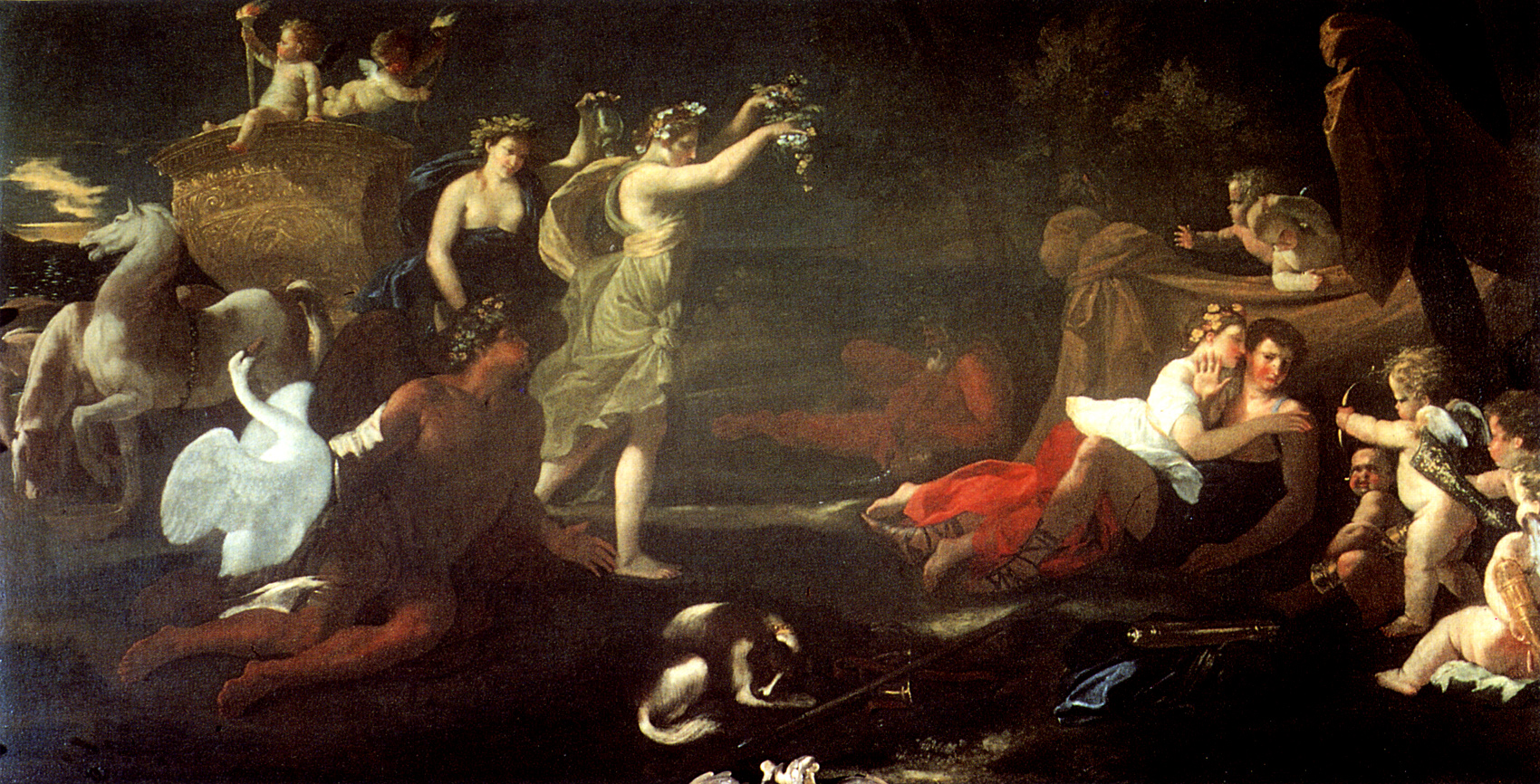
The picture in York, oil on canvas, 79 x 152 cm

The composition is described at length by Bellori.

- Collection of Cassiano dal Pozzo (probably)
- Collection of William Worsley, by 1770; passed to his descendants.

== See also ==
- List of paintings by Nicolas Poussin

== Bibliography ==
- Bellori, Giovanni Pietro (2005) [1672]. The Lives of the Modern Painters, Sculptors and Architects. Translated by Wohl, Alice Sedgwick; Wohl, Hellmut; Montanari, Tomaso. USA: Cambridge University Press. pp. 88–89.
- Blunt, Anthony (1966). The Paintings of Nicolas Poussin. Critical Catalogue. London: Phaidon. pp. 104, 105, 106 (nos. 144, 145).
- Smith, John (1837). A Catalogue Raisonné of the Works of the Most Eminent Dutch, Flemish and French Painters: Nicholas Poussin, Claude Lorraine, and Jean Baptist Greuze. Vol. 8. London: Smith and Son. pp. 129–130 (no. 251).
- Wright, Christopher (1985). Poussin. Paintings. A Catalogue Raisonné. England: Harlequin Books. pp. 129–130 (no. 6), 145 (no. 24).
- Wright, Christopher (2007). Poussin. Paintings. A Catalogue Raisonné. London: Chaucer Press. pp. 25–26 (no. 6), 53 (no. 24).
