= Landscape with Polyphemus =

Painting by Nicolas Poussin

- Paysage avec Polyphème (French)
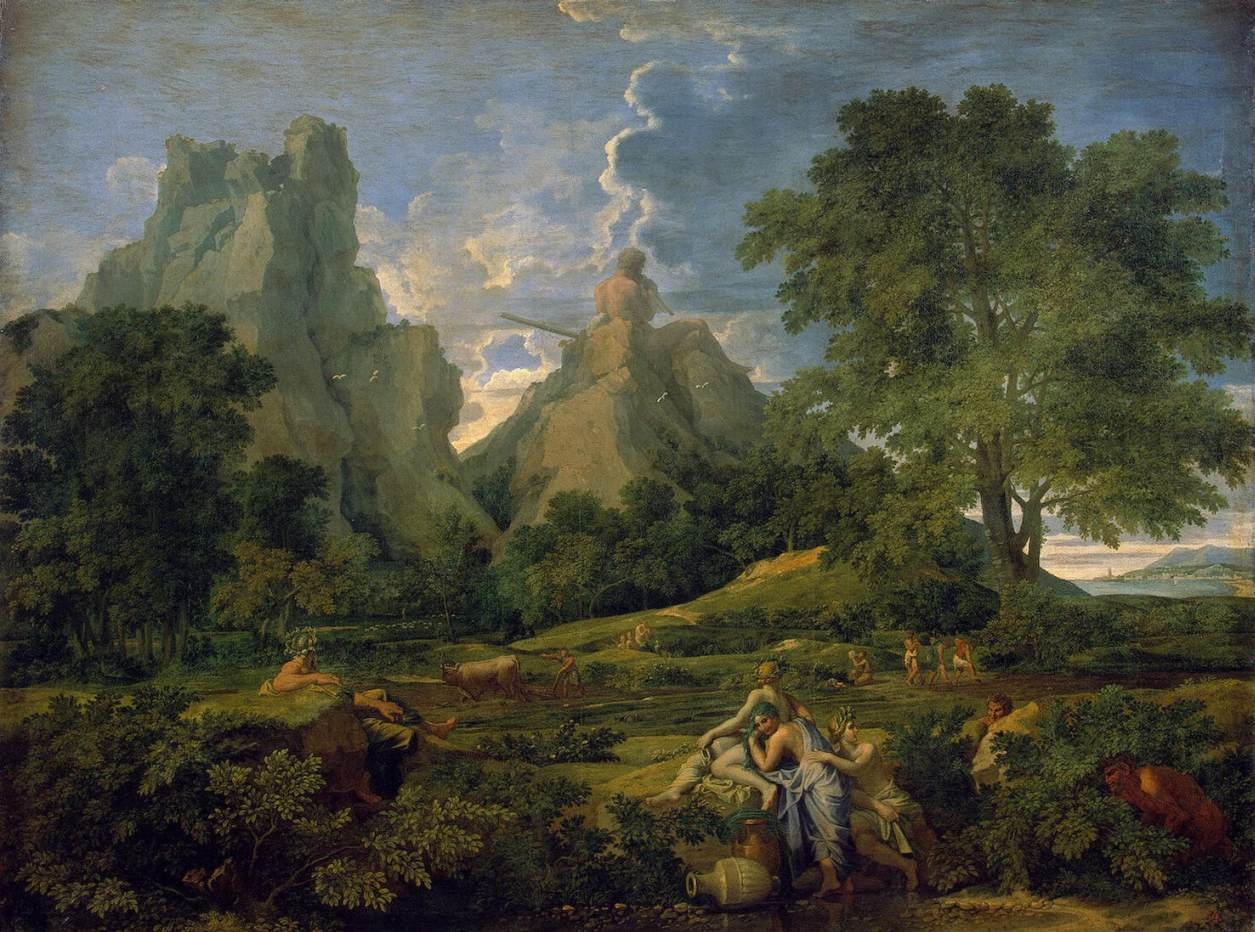
- Artist: Nicolas Poussin
- Year: 1649
- Medium: oil on canvas
- Dimensions: 150 × 198 cm
- Location: Hermitage Museum, Saint Petersburg

Landscape with Polyphemus (Paysage avec Polyphème) is a 1649 oil painting by French artist Nicolas Poussin. It is held in the Hermitage Museum, in Saint Petersburg.

== Theme ==
The painting refers to a Spanish literary work La Fábula de Polifemo y Galatea and Ovid's Metamorphoses. It was commissioned by French banker Jean Pointel and depicts characters from Greek mythology. In the foreground pictured are semi-nude nymphs watched by satyrs hidden in the nearby bushes. On green fields behind them people listen to music played on a flute by the Cyclops Polyphemus, who appears to be blended into rocky mountains in the background.

== History ==
In 1722 the painting was acquired for the Spanish king Philip V by Andrea Procaccini, a student of Carlo Maratta. Later, it was part of the collection of a French marquess who sold it in 1772 to a Russian prince, with the help of Denis Diderot, in order to pay a gambling debt. It is now located in Saint Petersburg as part of the Hermitage Museum's collection.

== See also ==
- List of paintings by Nicolas Poussin
