= The Inspiration of the Poet =

Painting by Nicolas Poussin

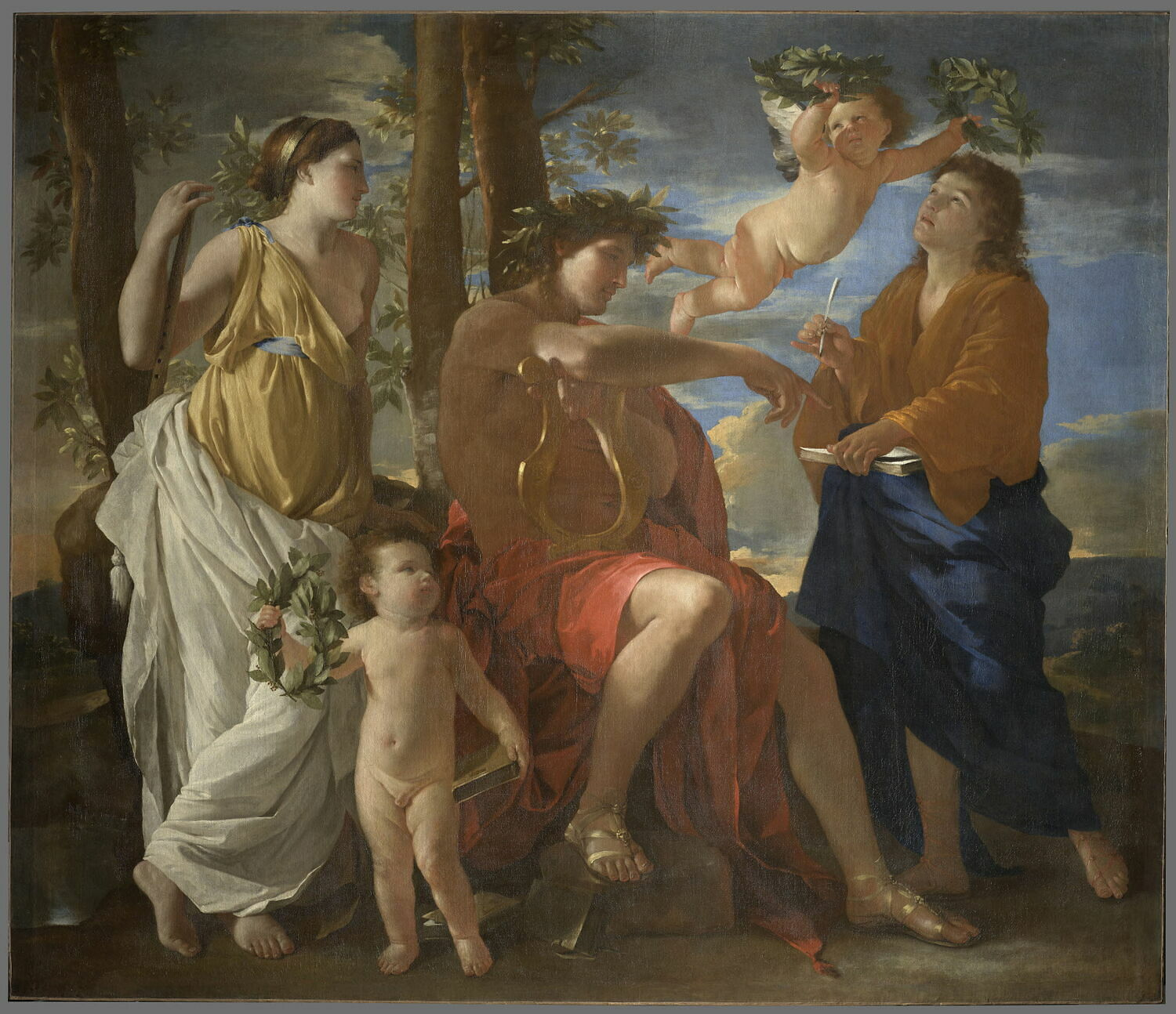
- Artist: Nicolas Poussin
- Year: 1629–1630
- Medium: Oil on canvas
- Dimensions: 183 cm × 213 cm (72 in × 84 in)
- Location: Louvre, Paris

The Inspiration of the Poet is an oil-on-canvas in the classical style by the artist Nicolas Poussin, painted between 1629 and 1630. It is held and exhibited at the Louvre, in Paris.

== History ==
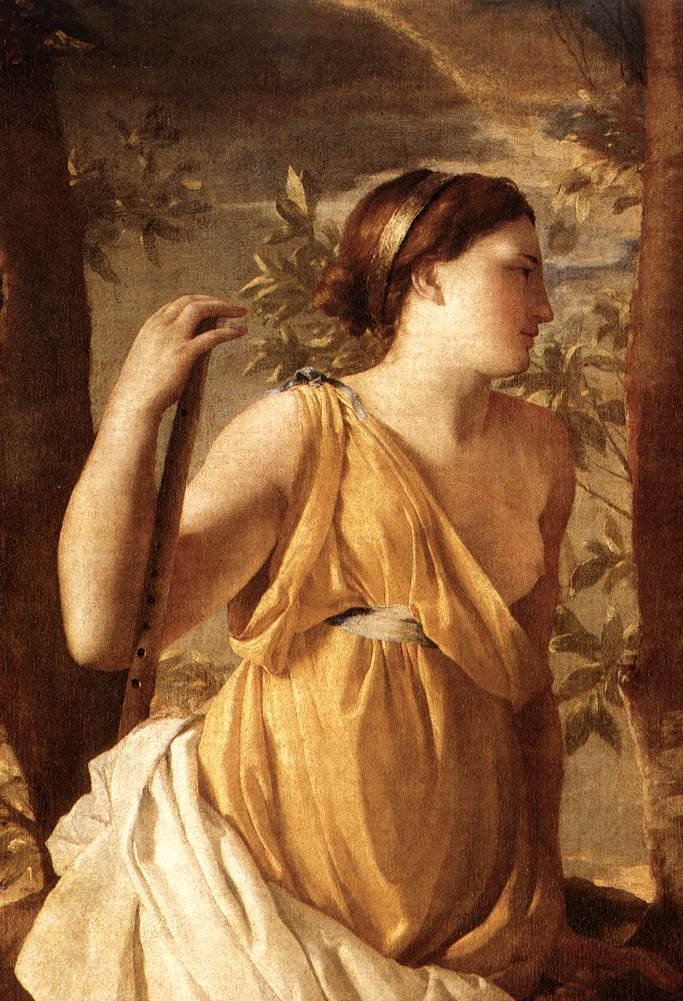
Detail of the Muse, perhaps Poussin's wife Anna

The painting seems to be the one which was in the collection of Cardinal Mazarin in 1653.

It was given to Louis XIV in 1693, together with its companion piece, A Seaport, by the French architect and gardener André Le Nôtre. It was acquired by the Louvre in 1911.

The painting depicts Apollo, accompanied by infant Cupids and by one of the Muses, about to crown a poet who is writing under his inspiration. It is not known to what the painting alludes, nor what is its exact subject. Perhaps the latter was always indefinite, because the picture appears in Mazarin's inventory of 1653 as Apollo with a Muse and a Poet crowned with Laurels. Its warm colouring reveals the Titianesque strain in Poussin's work; it must have been painted during his first Roman period, at the end of the 1620s. Several other paintings of this period are related to this work: The Inspiration of Anacreon, the Parnassus, and the book frontispiece drawn by Poussin and engraved by Claude Mellan for an edition of Virgil published by the Imprimerie Royale in 1641–1642.

Some critics put forward the hypothesis that the model for the Muse, often recognizable in other works of this period by Poussin, may have been Anna Dughet, whom he married in 1630 at San Lorenzo in Lucina (Rome).

== See also ==
- List of paintings by Nicolas Poussin
- Baroque
- Et in Arcadia ego
- History of painting
- Western painting
