= The Massacre of the Innocents (Poussin) =

Painting by Nicolas Poussin

Massacre of the Innocents
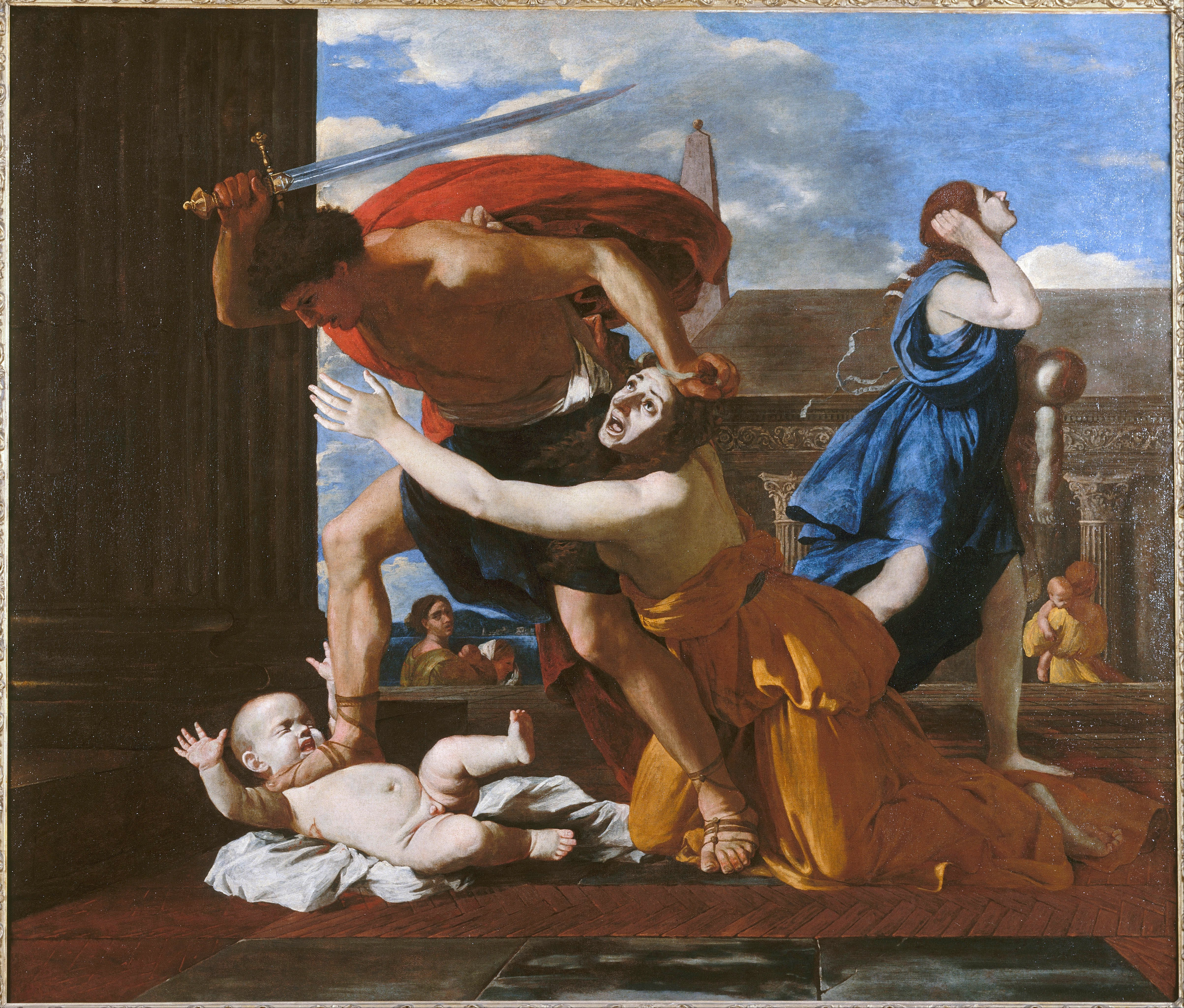
- Artist: Nicolas Poussin
- Year: c. 1628
- Medium: Oil on canvas
- Dimensions: 147 cm (58 in) × 171 cm (67 in)
- Location: Musée Condé
- Accession: PE 305

The Massacre of the Innocents (French: Le Massacre des Innocents) is a 1625-1632 painting by Nicolas Poussin, showing the Massacre of the Innocents. It was probably commissioned by the Roman collector Vincenzo Giustiniani, probably in memory of the Giustiniani children taken hostage by the Ottoman Empire in 1564. It remained in the Palazzo Giustiniani until 1804, when it was bought by Lucien Bonaparte. It then passed through several other hands before being bought in London by Henri d'Orleans, Duke of Aumale. It is now in the Musée Condé in Chantilly, France.

== See also ==
- List of paintings by Nicolas Poussin
