= Parnassus (Poussin) =

Painting by Nicolas Poussin

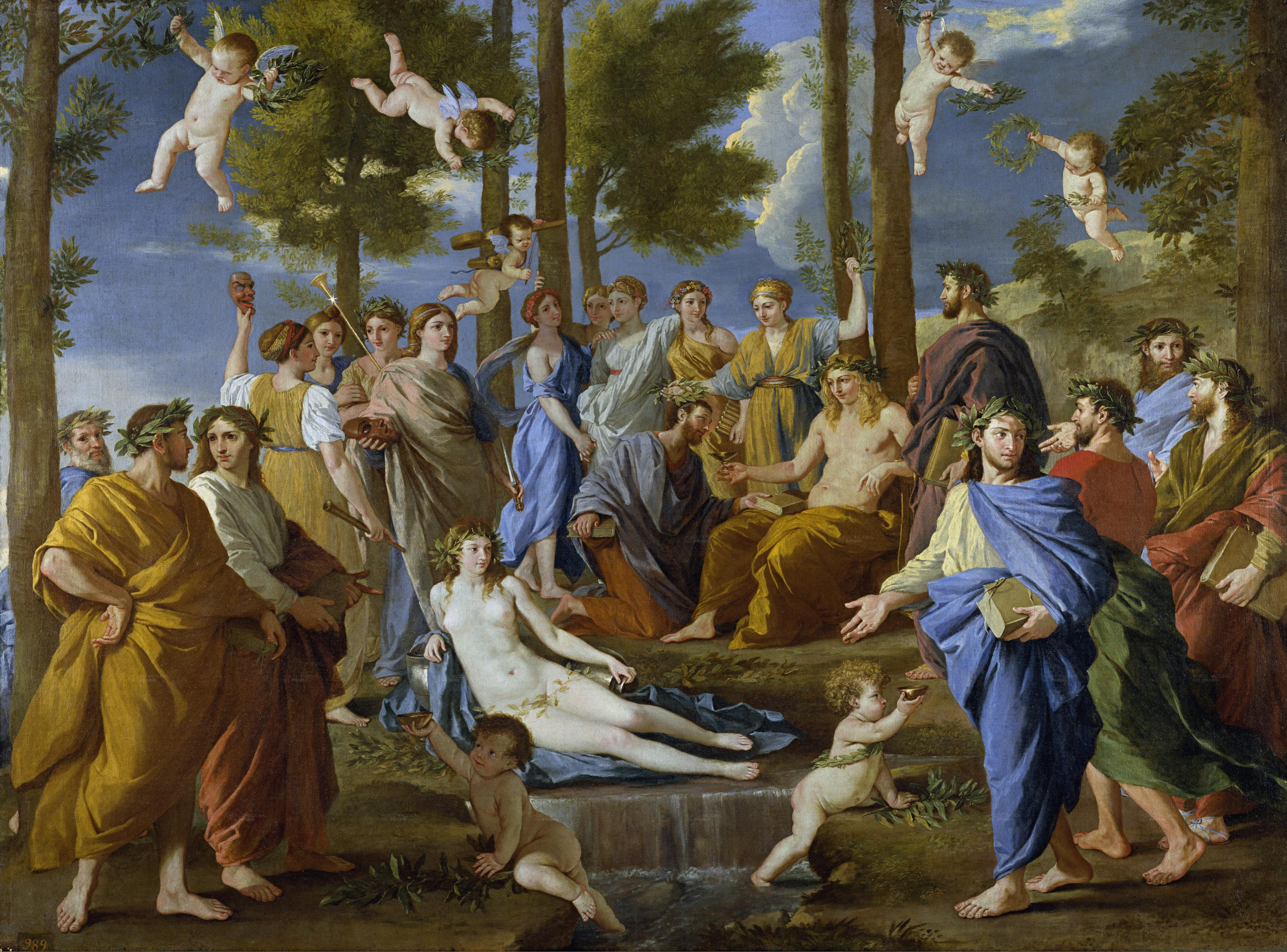
- Artist: Nicolas Poussin
- Year: c. 1631-1633
- Medium: oil on canvas
- Dimensions: 145 cm × 197 cm (57 in × 78 in)
- Location: Prado Museum; Madrid

Parnassus or Apollo and the Muses is an oil painting by Nicolas Poussin, from c. 1631-1633. It was inspired by the famous Raphael's Parnassus in the Stanza della Segnatura, and it is now held in the Prado Museum, in Madrid. Among the figures depicted are Apollo and, most likely, Homer.

== Description ==
German art historian Erwin Panofsky believed this work to be also a homage to Poussin's Roman benefactor, the poet Giambattista Marino.

In this a mythological scene, set in the Mount Parnassus, the god Apollo appears surrounded by the nine muses, each one of them carrying objects that made them recognizable, and several poets. The central figure seems to be Homer, whom the muse Calliope crowns with laurel.

Apollo and the Muses are gathered on Mount Parnassus, northeast of Delphi. In the foreground, the Castalian spring, which inspires those who drink from it, is depicted as a reclining nymph. In her right hand she holds a vase, her attribute. Apollo sits on the highest platform, and Homer, or the poet Marino, kneels before him, and is given a laurel wreath, a symbol of wisdom. He holds two books.

== Reproduction ==
Jean Dughet, Poussin's brother-in-law, reproduced the painting in an etching; it is not dated but must be previous to 1667.

== Provenance ==
The painting is believed to have been in the Meyers collection. It was first mentioned in Spain in a 1746 inventory of the La Granja de San Ildefonso palace.

== See also ==
- List of paintings by Nicolas Poussin
