= Landscape with Orpheus and Eurydice =

Painting by Nicolas Poussin

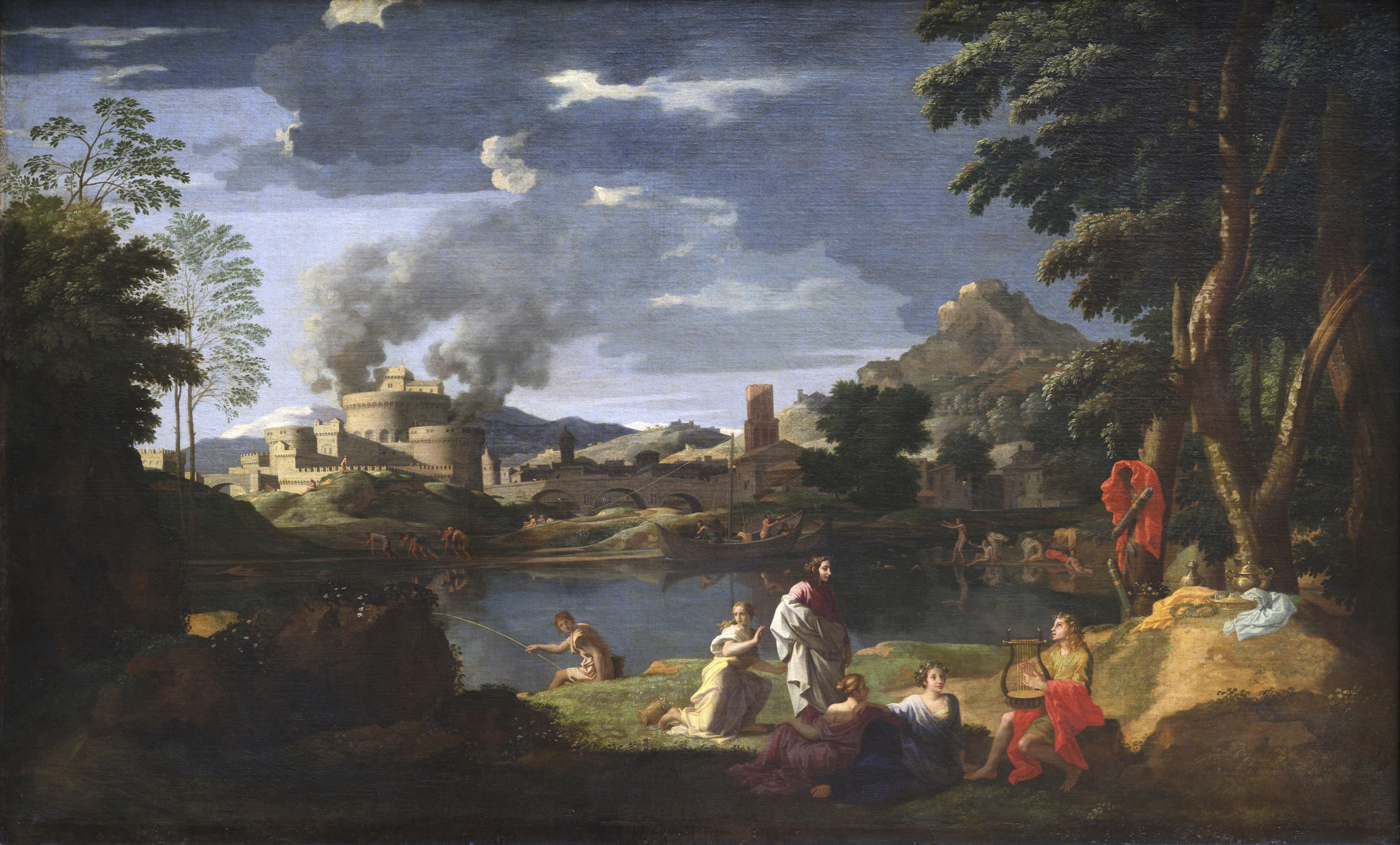
- Artist: Nicolas Poussin
- Year: c. 1650-1653
- Medium: Oil on canvas
- Dimensions: 124 cm × 200 cm (4 ft 1 in × 6 ft 7 in)
- Location: Louvre, Paris

Landscape with Orpheus and Eurydice is a 124 × 200 cm (approx 4 × 6.5 feet) oil-on-canvas painting by the French artist Nicolas Poussin, painted between 1650 and 1653. It depicts a mythological subject in the classical style and is in the collection of the Louvre in Paris.

== History ==
Nicolas Poussin painted this work for his longtime friend and patron Jean Pointel, who was a rich banker in Paris. Pointel also was a member of the libertines, a circle which Poussin himself frequented. It was in Pointel's collection, which had many works by Poussin, but was stored away after the political climate in Paris changed. In its place Poussin`s landscape with snake and dying man, was hung in Pointel`s private collection.

Poussin places the story of Orpheus in the Campagna Romana (Roman countryside): the Castel Sant'Angelo and the Torre delle Milizie ("Tower of the Militia") figure in this painting, borrowed from the landscape of the Eternal City. Dense smoke pours from a fire which devastates the Castle, and darkens a sky already overcast with sombre clouds. The fall of the light divides the landscape diagonally into bright and dark areas – a division clearly seen on the Torre delle Milizie.

Many of Poussin's pictures have darkened, mainly as a result of a red underpainting which has begun to show through the colours. The Orpheus, however, is free of this: it has kept its original transparency even in the darker passages, and the whole painting is in a particularly fine state of preservation.

This work by Poussin remains cryptic and there are various opinions about its possible interpretation.

== See also ==
- List of paintings by Nicolas Poussin
- Baroque painting
- Et in Arcadia ego
