= The Manna (Poussin) =

Painting by Nicolas Poussin

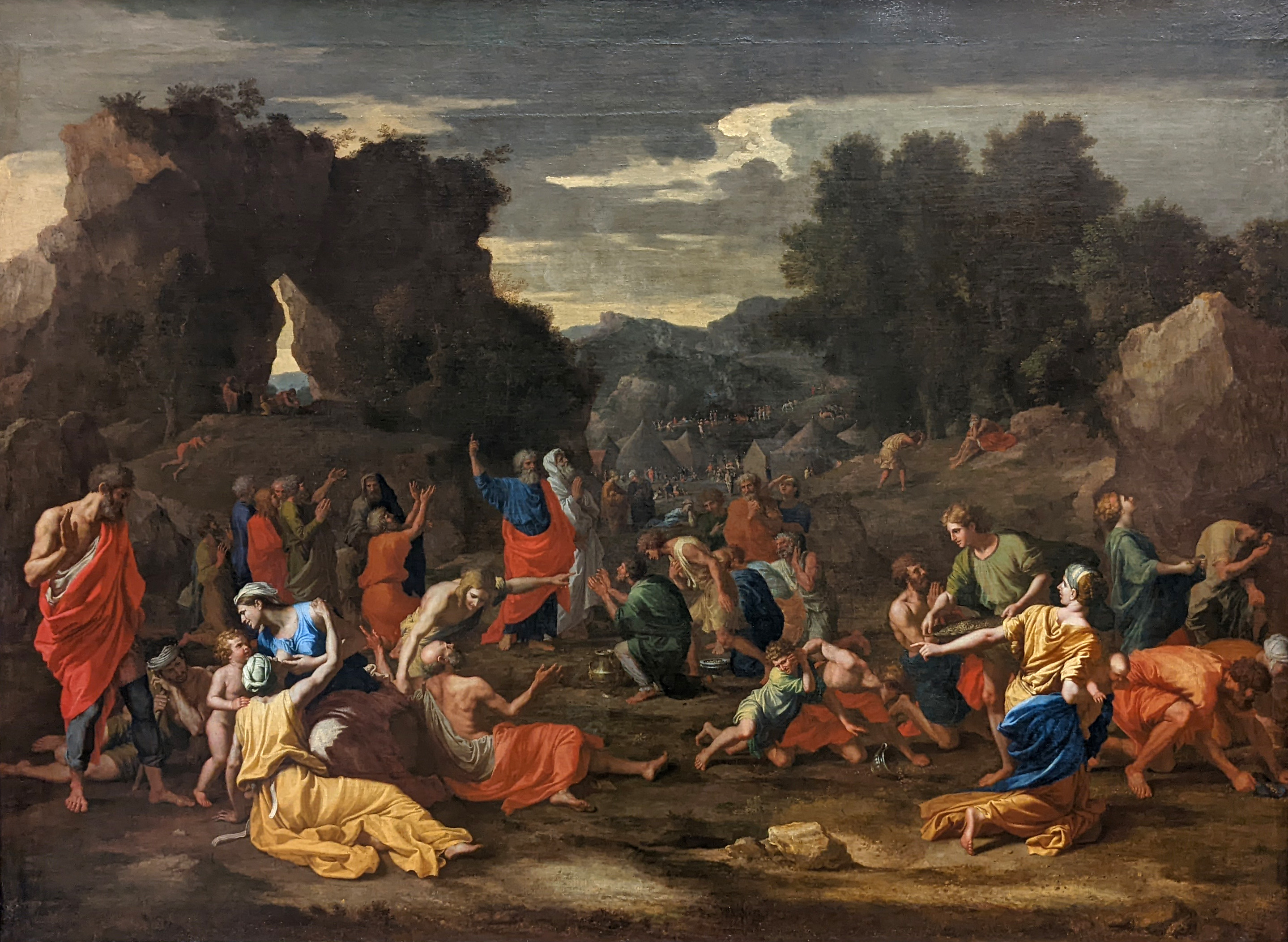
The Manna, by Poussin, 149 x 200 cm

The Manna (French: La Manne), formerly titled The Israelites Gathering Manna in the Desert (Les Israélites recueillant la manne dans le désert), is an oil painting by Poussin, dated to 1638 or 1639, which is now in the Louvre, in Paris. The work is regarded as one of Poussin's most ambitious.

== Description ==
Scene: a rocky desert, with high cliffs and trees on each side, and the tents of Israel in a valley in background; in middle ground, Moses and Aaron, with people prostrating themselves before them; in foreground, men, women, and children gathering manna.

== Provenance ==
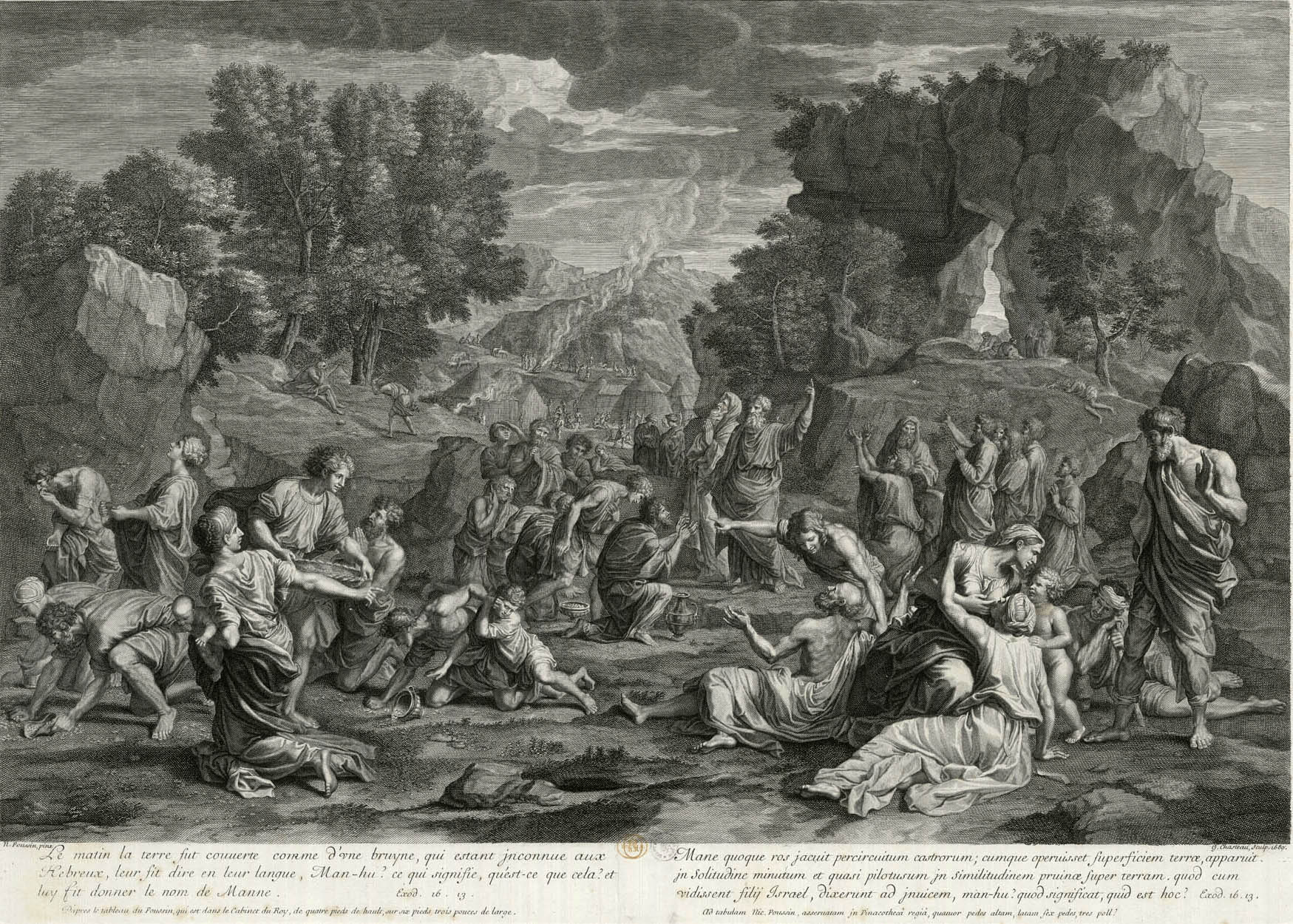
Engraving by Guillaume Chasteau, 44.5 x 62.5 cm

Painted in Rome in 1638 or 1639 for Paul Fréart de Chantelou; whence passed to Nicolas Fouquet, Superintendent of Finances to Louis XIV. Engraved by Guillaume Chasteau (1680); Benoît Audran the Elder; Bern; Henri Testelin.

== See also ==
- List of paintings by Nicolas Poussin

== Bibliography ==
- Champlin, John Denison Jr.; Perkins, Charles C., eds. (1887). Cyclopedia of Painters and Paintings. Vol. 3. New York: Charles Scribner's Sons. p. 188.
