= Venus Weeping for Adonis (Poussin) =

Painting by Nicolas Poussin

- Vénus pleurant Adonis (French)
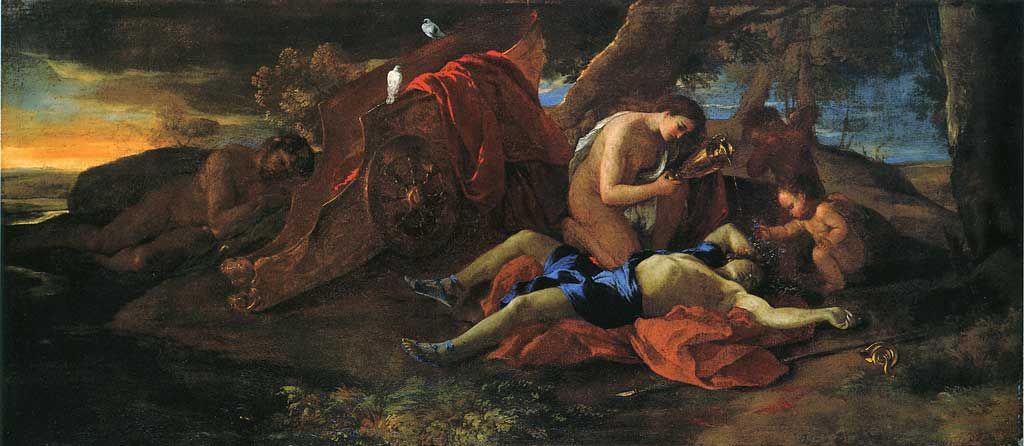
- Artist: Nicolas Poussin
- Year: c. 1626-1627
- Medium: Oil on canvas
- Dimensions: 57 cm × 128 cm (22 in × 50 in)
- Location: Musée des Beaux-Arts de Caen, Caen

Venus Weeping for Adonis is an oil on canvas painting by the French painter Nicolas Poussin, from c. 1626-1627. Painted after his relocation to Italy it is now part of the collection of the Musée des Beaux-Arts de Caen.

== History and description ==
The story of Venus and Adonis, as narrated in Ovid's Metamorphoses, was a popular subject in Baroque times as an allegory for death and rebirth and had parallels with the Christian belief in Christ's resurrection. In the painting Adonis' posture is reminiscent of the crucified Christ and Venus' actions akin to those of Saint Mary.

The painting depicts the goddess Venus mourning the death of her mortal lover Adonis after he was gored by a boar whilst hunting. She is pouring nectar onto his wounds after which a scarlet anemone flower would spring up from his blood to his permanent memory. The nearby chariot is reminiscent of Pluto, representing a symbol of death. The two doves perched thereon are attributes of Venus.

The work found its way into the French royal collection before being sent to Caen.

== See also ==
- List of paintings by Nicolas Poussin
