= The Martyrdom of Saint Erasmus (Poussin) =

Painting by Nicolas Poussin

- Le Martyre de saint Érasme (French)
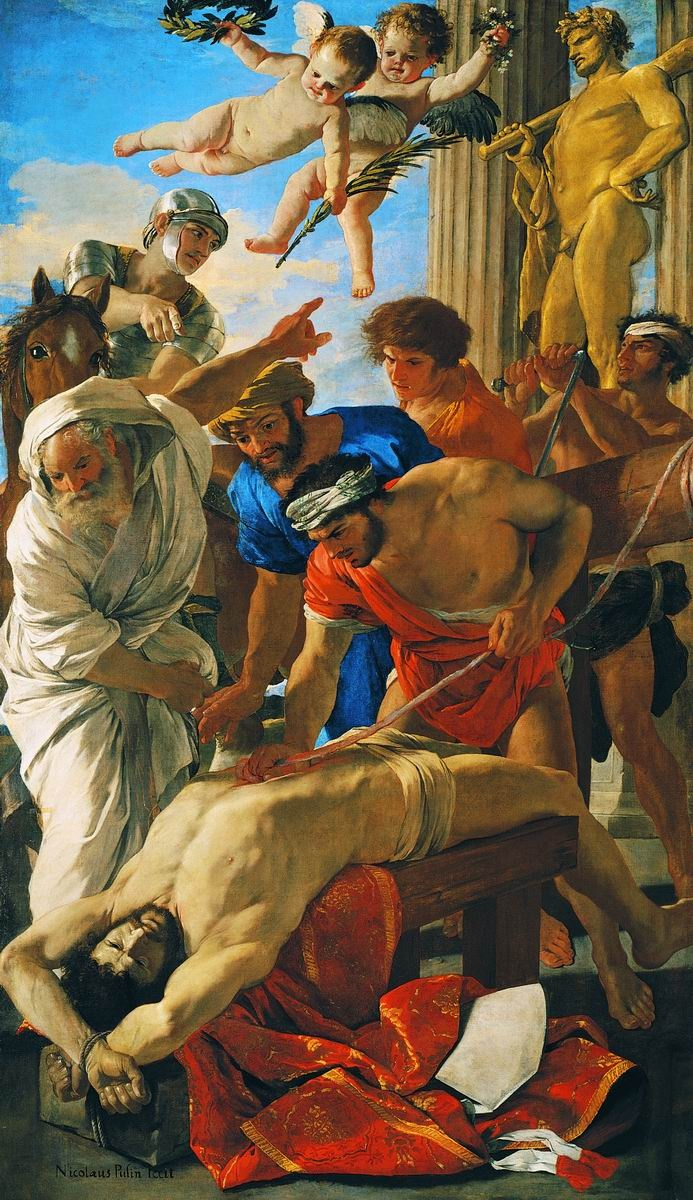
- Artist: Nicolas Poussin
- Year: 1628–1629
- Medium: Oil on canvas
- Dimensions: 320 cm × 186 cm (130 in × 73 in)
- Location: Pinacoteca Vaticana (Room XII), Vatican

The Martyrdom of Saint Erasmus is an altarpiece, painted by Nicolas Poussin in 1628–1629, originally displayed in St. Peter's Basilica, Rome.

== History ==
The painting was commissioned on February 5, 1628, by the Fabric of Saint Peter, to adorn the altar dedicated to Erasmus of Formia in St. Peter's Basilica. More precisely, it was to be located to the left of the north transept, near the Martyrdom of Saint Processus and Saint Martinian by Valentin de Boulogne (1629). The Fabric required Poussin to adopt the composition of the painting to be replaced, except that the white-robed pagan priest was to be moved to the side of the composition. The Pope first invited Pietro da Cortona to carry out the commission, but Poussin was finally chosen thanks to the intervention of his protector, Cassiano dal Pozzo, the secretary of Cardinal Francesco Barberini. The latter had previously commissioned him to create The Capture of Jerusalem (Israel Museum) in 1626 and The Death of Germanicus in 1627, assuring Poussin's reputation in Rome where he had arrived four years earlier.

Two preparatory drawings are known, the first kept in the Biblioteca Ambrosiana in Milan, and the second in the Gabinetto dei Disegni e delle Stampe of the Uffizi in Florence. Poussin then produced a modello currently in the National Gallery of Canada in Ottawa. The altarpiece panel is the only work of Poussin's that can be seen in a public building in the city from the time of the painter, and is also the only altarpiece to which he added his signature.

The painting was finally transferred to the Quirinal Palace before 1763. It was seized by French troops in 1797 and sent to the Louvre in Paris, where it remained until 1817. On that date, it was returned to the Holy See and kept at the Vatican Museums.

== Description ==
=== Subject ===
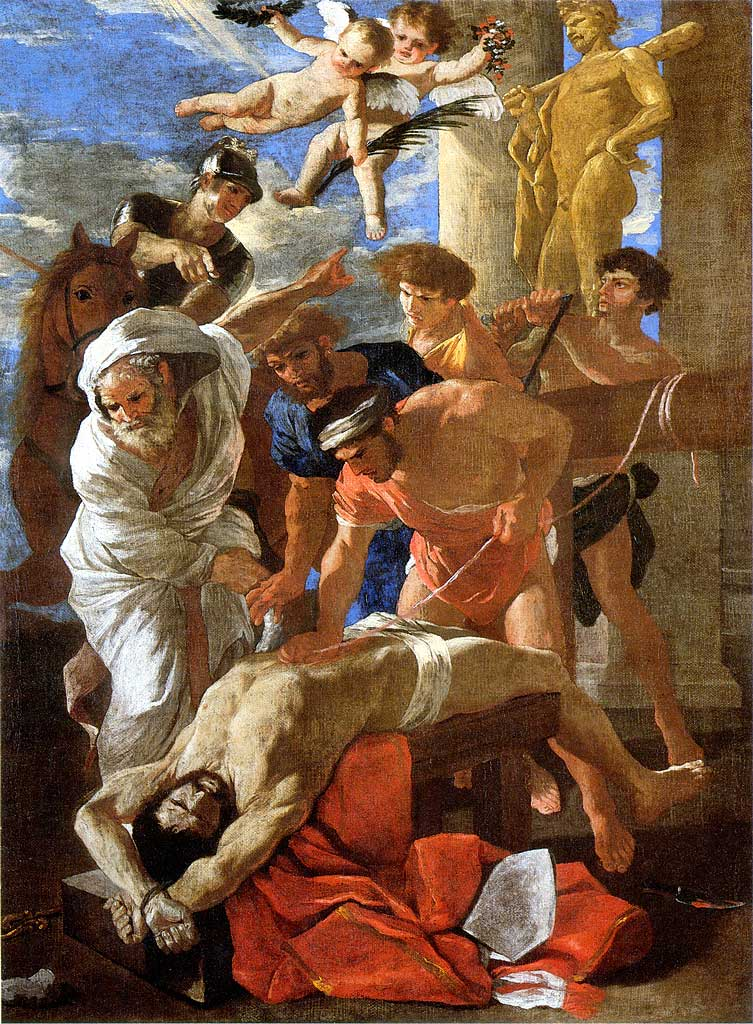
Modello (National Gallery of Canada)

The painting represents one of the many tortures suffered by Erasmus of Formia, Bishop of Antioch, taken by an angel to southern Italy, and pursued by the persecutions of Maximian Hercules. The torture represented here does not come from the Roman Martyrology but from the Golden Legend of Jacobus de Voragine. The emperor ordered that he be tied to a table and his intestines extracted by a windlass. This is the last torture suffered by the saint before his death, according to legend. The emperor would have ordered the saint to sacrifice to the gods, and he would have replied that he "refused to sacrifice to the stone gods whom you resemble". Then, once taken to the temple of Jupiter, the statue would have collapsed into dust. The statue here represented at the top right does not represent Jupiter but Hercules, recalling the nickname of the emperor.

=== Original location ===
The painting was intended to decorate the altarpiece of the altar located to the left of the north transept. This altar has a decoration that dates back to the time of Pope Clement VIII, made of gilded stucco and polychromatic marble. It has been consecrated to Saint Erasmus of Formia since 1605, after the relics of the saint were transferred to the site from the old basilica, where the cult of this saint dates back to 1119. It is an altar that is poorly endowed for his worship but which is the subject of fervent worship on the part of the faithful, which no doubt explains its continued existence in the new basilica. The old altarpiece was decorated with a painting known only from an engraving by Jacques Callot. This was attributed to an obscure Mannerist painter of Polish origin by the name of Thomas Treter, and dated around 1575. However, this attribution and dating is questioned. Treter's painting remained in place in the new basilica between at least 1605 and 1627.

=== Analysis ===
The Martyrdom of Saint Erasmus, by its position, was intended to be viewed mainly from an angle, and Poussin took this into account in its composition. He structured it in obliques starting from the bottom left and the head of the saint to the top right, the statue, along the body of the saint and the arm of the priest. The representation does not insist on the horror of the scene, but on Erasmus's stoic resistance. The martyr (etymologically, the witness), testifies to the sacrifice of Christ and to the strength of his resisting faith. Poussin is marked here by the imprint of the large Venetian altarpieces and by the coloration of Pietro da Cortona.

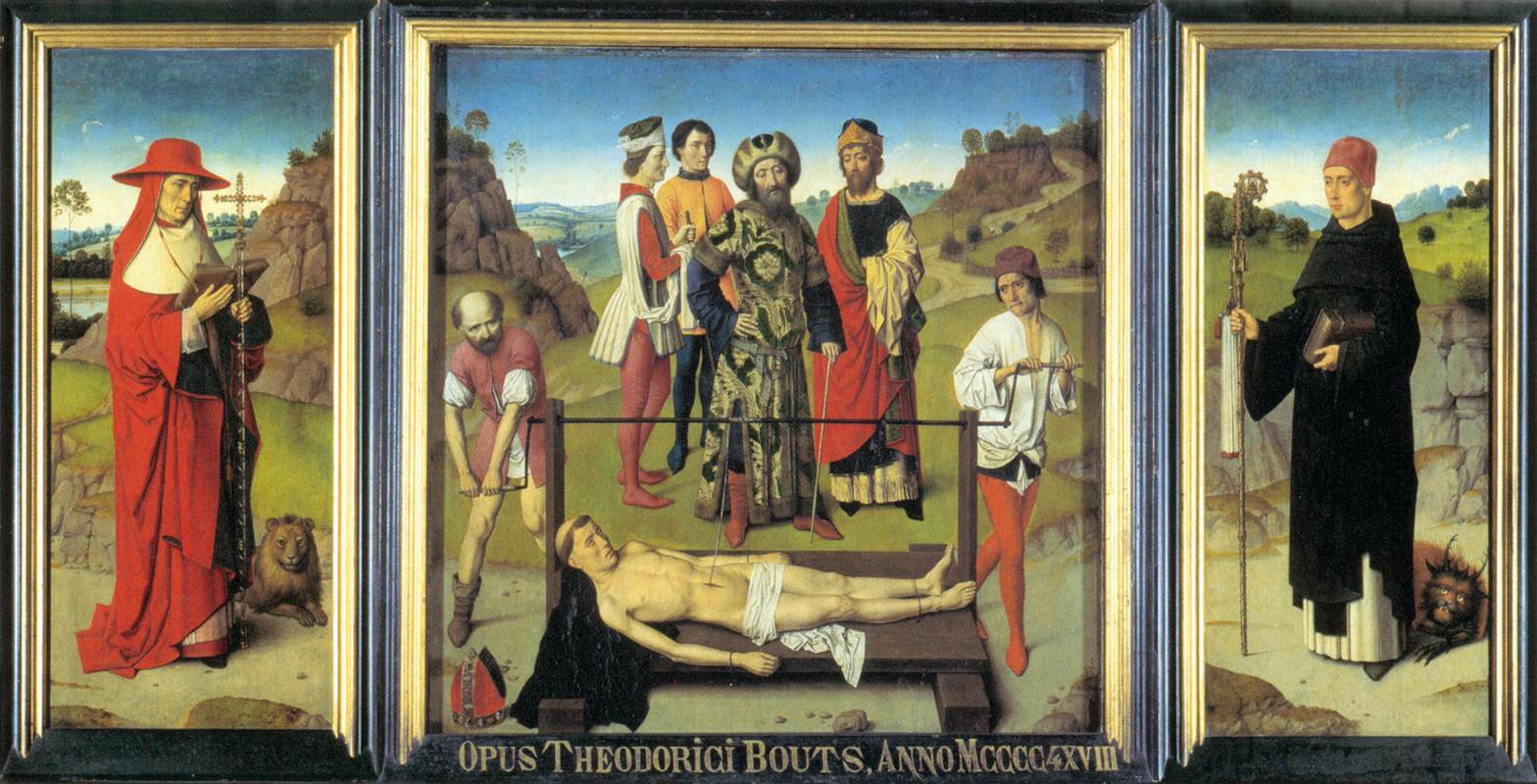
Dieric Bouts, The Martyrdom of Saint Erasmus (c. 1466)

== See also ==
- List of paintings by Nicolas Poussin
