= Seven Sacraments (Poussin) =

Two series of paintings by Nicolas Poussin

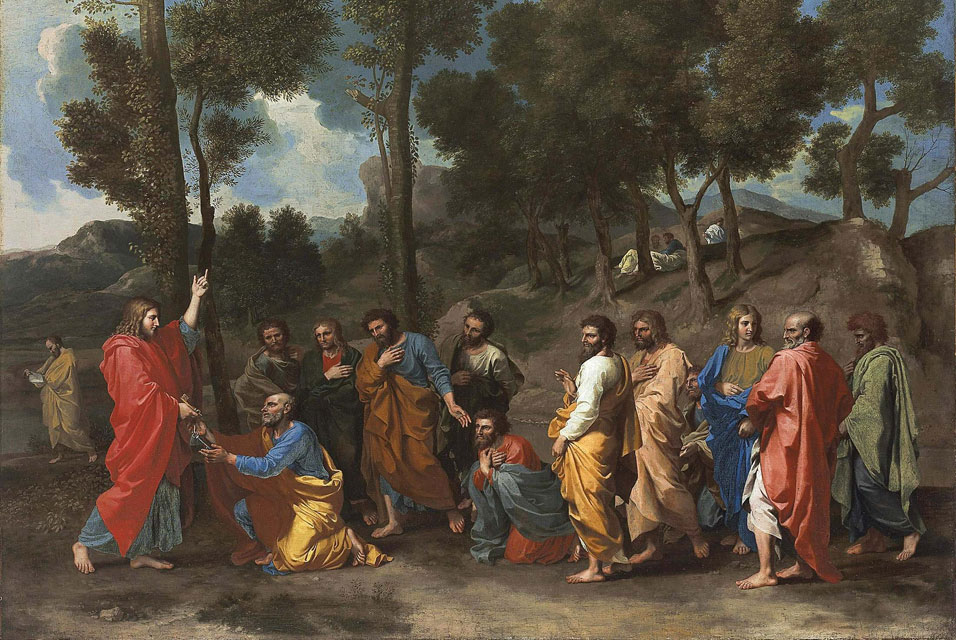
Ordination from the first series

The Seven Sacraments refers to two series of paintings of the seven sacraments by the French painter Nicolas Poussin.

== First series ==
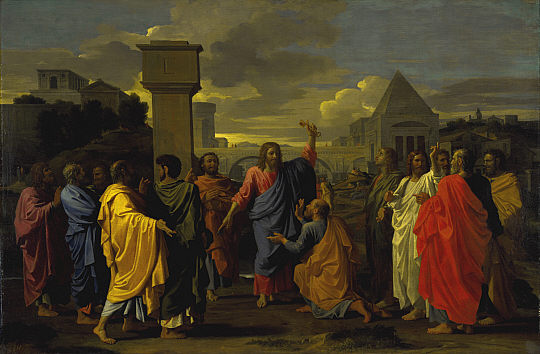
Ordination from the second series

Painted between 1637 and 1640, the first series was commissioned by Cassiano dal Pozzo in the second half of the 1630s and was sold to the Dukes of Rutland in 1784. One of the seven, Penance, was destroyed in a fire at the Rutlands' Belvoir Castle in 1816, and Baptism was acquired by the National Gallery of Art in Washington DC in 1939, where it still resides. The remaining five were still at Belvoir Castle at the time when Anthony Blunt wrote his catalogue in 1966, and then were on loan to the National Gallery in London until November 2010, when all five of these paintings were taken off show prior to the attempted sale of Ordination on 8 December that year. Ordination was ultimately purchased by the Kimbell Art Museum for US$24.3 million and was displayed for the first time there on September 14, 2011. In 2013 the Fitzwilliam Museum in Cambridge purchased Extreme Unction. In January 2023, an export licence was issued for Confirmation, which was sold abroad. In 2024 the National Gallery in London acquired Eucharist. Marriage remains in the collection of the Trustees of the Duke of Rutland’s 2000 Settlement, and is currently on loan to the National Gallery in London

The images linked to below are of the remaining six paintings of the first series, and an engraving of the lost painting Penance:

1. Baptism (image)
2. Confirmation (image)
3. Eucharist (image)
4. Penance (image)
5. Extreme Unction (image)
6. Ordination (image)
7. Marriage (image)

== Second series ==
The second series was painted for Paul Fréart de Chantelou from 1644 to 1648 and was acquired by Francis Egerton, 3rd Duke of Bridgewater in 1798. The paintings passed by descent to the Earls of Ellesmere, the last of whom became the Duke of Sutherland in 1964. All seven paintings of the second series have since 1945 been on loan to the Scottish National Gallery, Edinburgh as part of the Bridgewater Loan.

The images linked to below are of the seven paintings of the second series:

1. Baptism (image)
2. Confirmation (image)
3. Eucharist (image)
4. Penance (image)
5. Extreme Unction (image)
6. Marriage (image)
7. Ordination (image)

== See also ==
- List of paintings by Nicolas Poussin
