= List of paintings by Nicolas Poussin =

This page is a list of paintings by Nicolas Poussin (Andelys, 15 June 1594 – Rome, 19 November 1665). The attributions vary notably from one art historian to another. Jacques Thuillier, one of the most restrictive, produced a list in 1994 that gave 224 uncontested autograph works and 33 works with minor or major doubts about their attribution to Poussin. Certain attributions have since changed, when paintings thought lost are rediscovered, meaning that this list cannot be considered exhaustive.

== List ==
This list includes paintings whose locations have been definitely found. The numbers refer to the two last 'catalogues raisonnés' cited in the sources : Thuillier 1994 and Blunt 1966.

Tableau	Title	Date	Dimensions	Notes	Collection	Number in the Thuillier/Blunt catalogues
	Saint Denis the Areopagite crowned by an angel	1620–1621 c.	173 x 108 cm	Painting from the église Saint-Germain-l'Auxerrois (Paris)	Rouen, musée des beaux-arts	3/R51
	The Death of Chione	1622	109,5 x 159,5 cm	Attributed by Denis Mahon in 1998. Bought in 2016.	Lyon, musée des beaux-arts	
	Death of the Virgin	1623	202 x 137 cm	From a retable commissioned by the archbishop of Paris Jean-François de Gondi for Notre-Dame de Paris, seized at the French Revolution and deposited in the Louvre, sent to Brussels in 1803, considered to be a copy, disappeared in 1814. Rediscovered in 2000 at Sterrebeek church.	Sterrebeek, Sint-Pancratiuskerk church	11/91
	Moses left by the river	1624 c.	145 x 196 cm	Bought in Paris in 1742 by Augustus III of Saxony	Dresden, Gemäldegalerie Alte Meister	15/10
	Triumph of a poet or Triumph of Ovid	1624–1625 c.	148 x 176 cm	Attribution contested by Anthony Blunt	Rome, Palazzo Corsini	13/R92
	Rinaldo and Armida	1624–1625 c. (or 1630 ?)	80 x 107 cm		London, Dulwich Picture Gallery	20/202
	Cephalus and Aurora	1624–1625 c.	79 x 152 cm	Acquired by the Worsley collection before 1770	York, Hovingham Hall, Worsley Collection	25/145
	The Mount of Olives	1624–1625 c.	62 x 49 cm	Oil on copper, formerly in the dal Pozzo collection, rediscovered 1985	Private collection	27/
	Venus and Adonis	1624–1625 c.	98.5 x 134.6 cm	Attribution contested by Blunt	Fort Worth, Kimbell Art Museum	30/R107
	Child with a cornucopia	1624–1625 c.	54,8 x 51,8	Recorded in the collection in 1713. Attribution contested by Blunt	Rome, Palazzo Pallavicini-Rospigliosi	31/
	Sleeping Venus with Cupid or Venus espied by shepherds	1624–1626 c.	71 x 96 cm	Mentioned in the inventory of the Electors of Saxony in 1722. Attribution uncertain.	Dresden, Gemäldegalerie Alte Meister	28/189
	Mercury, Herse and Aglaulus	1624–1626 c.	53,5 x 77,5 cm	From the collection of Jacques-Édouard Gatteaux, damaged by fire during the Paris Commune (1871)	Paris, École nationale supérieure des beaux-arts	29/164
	Rinaldo and Armida	1625 c.	95 x 133 cm	Acquired by Catherine II of Russia and sent to Moscow in 1930	Moscow, Pushkin Museum	16/203
	Gideon's Battle against the Midianites	1625–1626 c.	98 x 137 cm	Commissioned by the Roman nobleman Marcello Sacchetti	Rome, Pinacoteca Vaticana	21/31
	Joshua's Victory over the Amorites	1625–1626	97,5 x 134 cm	Pendant to Victory over the Amalekites. Sold by Poussin for 7 écus, bought by Catherine II of Russia	Moscow, Pushkin Museum	18/30
	Joshua's Victory over the Amalekites	1625–1626	97,5 x 134 cm	Pendant to Victory over the Amorites. Sold by Poussin for 7 écus, bought by Catherine II of Russia	Saint-Petersburg, Hermitage Museum	17/29
	Bacchanale or Bacchus and Ariadne	1625–1626	122 x 169 cm	Mentioned in the catalogue of the Royal Palace of La Granja de San Ildefonso in 1746. Attribution rejected by Blunt but supported by Thuillier and Rosenberg	Madrid, Prado	24/R66
	Cephalus and Aurora	1625–1626 c.	96,9 x 131,3 cm	Bought by the National Gallery in 1831. Re-dated to 1626–1627 from a brand on the back.	London, National Gallery	43/144
	Venus and Adonis	1625–1626 (vers)	75 x 100 cm	Collection of Sir Joshua Reynolds in 1766	Providence (Rhode Island), Rhode Island School of Design Museum of Art	42/185
	Landscape with nymph and satyr or Amor Omnia Vincit	1625–1627 c.	97 x 127,5 cm	Attribution supported by Rosenberg but rejected by Thuillier and Blunt; Blunt attributes it to Pier Francesco Mola	Cleveland, Museum of Art	R124/R58
	Numa Pompilius and the nymph Egeria	1625–1628 c.	100 x 75 cm	Acquired by the duc d'Aumale as part of Frédéric Reiset's collection	Chantilly, musée Condé	60/168
	The Massacre of the Innocents	1625–1629 c.	147 x 171 cm	Painted for Vincenzo Giustiniani. Bought by the duc d'Aumale in 1854	Chantilly, musée Condé	19/67
	Venus weeping for Adonis	1626	57 x 128 cm	Mentioned in the inventory of cardinal Angelo Giori. In the French royal collection in 1683 and sent to Caen in 1804.	Caen, musée des Beaux-Arts	26/186
	The Destruction of the Temple in Jerusalem	1626	145,8 x 194 cm	Painted for Cardinal Barberini, who paid Poussin 61 écus for it on 3 February 1626. Passed into cardinal Richelieu's collection, lost at the end of the 18th century. Rediscovered in 1995 and given to the Israel Museum in 1999	Jerusalem, Israel Museum	35/
	View of Grottaferrata, made up of Venus and Adonis and Landscape with a river god	1626 c.	77 x 202 cm (74,5 x 112 cm + 77 x 88 cm)	Dal Pozzo collection. Cut into two parts in the 18th century and reunited in 2009	Montpellier, musée Fabre	22/R105
	Apollo and Daphne	1626 c.	97 x 131 cm	In the Elector of Bavaria's collection in 1782.	Munich, Alte Pinakothek	23/130
	Children's bacchanal	1626	56 x 76 cm	Tempera. Collection of cardinal Chigi, remained at the Palazzo Chigi until 1914, entered the Italian national collection in 1979	Rome, Galleria Nazionale d'Arte Antica, palazzo Barberini	36/192
	Children's bacchanal	1626	74 x 85 cm	Tempera. Collection of cardinal Chigi, remained at the Palazzo Chigi until 1914, entered the Italian national collection in 1979. Not a pendant to the former.	Rome, Galleria Nazionale d'Arte Antica, palazzo Barberini	37/193
	Lamentation over the dead Christ	1626	102 x 148 cm	In the collections of the Elector of Bavaria in the 18th century	Munich, Alte Pinakothek	38/82
	Venus surprised by satyrs	1626	77 x 100 cm	Attribution rejected by Blunt then by Thuillier but recently reattributed to Poussin	Zurich, Kunsthaus	B7/R113
	Bacchic scene or Nymph riding a satyr	1626 c.	96 x 74,5 cm	Mentioned in 1749 in the collection of William VIII, Landgrave of Hesse-Kassel	Kassel (Hesse), Old masters gallery of the Lande of Hesse	44/198
	Descent from the cross or The deposition from the cross	1626 c.	119 × 98 cm	Collection of Heinrich von Brühl, whole collection acquired by Catherine II of Russia in 1768	Saint-Petersburg, Hermitage Museum	39/80
	The Infancy of Bacchus	1626 c.	135 x 168 cm	Bought by the duc d'Aumale in England in 1859	Chantilly, musée Condé	46/134
	The Mount of Olives	1626 c. or 1632–1633	60,5 x 47 cm	oil on copper, formerly in the Barberini collection. Sold at auction for $6.7 million to a private buyer in January 1999	Private collection	88
	Helios and Phaeton with Saturn and the Four Seasons or Apollo loaning his chariot to Phaeton	1626–1627 c.	122 x 153 cm	Located in Paris in 1674, then Potsdam in 1773	Berlin, Gemäldegalerie	51/172
	The Nurture of Bacchus or A Little Bacchanal	1626–1627 c.	97 x 136 cm	Acquired by the French royal collection before 1683. Attribution rejected by Anthony Blunt	Paris, musée du Louvre	50/R64
	The Nurture of Bacchus or The Infancy of Bacchus	1626–1627 c.	75 x 97 cm		London, National Gallery	52/133
	Venus and Mercury, made up of Venus and Mercury (image, left) and Concert of loves	1626–1627 c.	78 x 85 cm et 57 x 51 cm	Original composition known through a drawing in the Louvre. Cut up during the 18th century.	London, Dulwich Picture Gallery and Paris, musée du Louvre	34/184
	Virgin and Child	1626–1627 c.	58,5 x 49,5 cm	Dal Pozzo collection. Pendant to the Piéta at Cherbourg, repainted	Brighton, Preston Manor	40
	Piéta	1626–1627 c.	57,5 x 48,5 cm	Dal Pozzo collection. Pendant to the Brighton Virgin and Child	Cherbourg, musée Thomas-Henry	41/81
	Bacchus-Apollo or Bacchus and Erigone	1626–1627 c. (or c. 1628 ?)	98 x 73,5 cm	Originally used for Bacchus-Erigone, then painted over by Poussin with a Bacchus-Apollo. Much later repainting, to cover the figures' genitalia.	Stockholm, Nationalmuseum	53/135
	Bacchic scene or Nymph and satyr drinking	1626–1628	74 x 60 cm	Copy of the Moscow painting considered to be by Poussin himself	Madrid, Prado	45a/200
	Bacchic scene or Nymph and satyr drinking	1626–1628	77 x 62 cm	Copy of the Prado painting considered to be by Poussin himself	Moscow, Pushkin Museum	45b/200
	Midas washing himself in the source of the river Pactolus	1626–1628 c.	97,5 x 72,5 cm	Acquired by the museum in 1871	New York, Metropolitan Museum of Art	47/165
	Midas at the source of the Pactolus	1626–1628 c.	50 x 66 cm	Sold on 19 February 2011	Ajaccio, Musée Fesch	48/166
	Olympos and Marsyas	1626–1628 c.	102,5 x 89,5 cm	Rediscovered in 1969 by Pierre Rosenberg, bought by the musée du Louvre then returned to its owners in 1978 after a judicial hearing	Private collection	49
	Narcissus and Cupid	1626–1629 c.	53 x 41,9 cm	Rediscovered then sold at auction in 1997	Private collection	
	Sleeping nymph surprised by satyrs or Venus surprised by satyrs	1627	66 x 50,8 cm	Attribution initially rejected by Blunt and Thuillier, recently backed by Rosenberg after an X-ray	London, National Gallery	B8/R113
	The Poet's Inspiration or The Inspiration of Anacreon	1627 c.	94 x 69,5 cm	In the collection of the Elector of Hanover in 1779	Hanover, Niedersächsisches Landesmuseum Hannover	72/125
	Acis and Galatea	1627–1628	97 x 135 cm	Given to the gallery in 1916	Dublin, National Gallery of Ireland	54/128
	The shepherds of Arcadia (Et in Arcadia ego)	1627–1628	101 x 82 cm	In the collection of Louis-Henri de Loménie de Brienne (son of Henri-Auguste de Loménie) at the end of the 17th century and entered the collection of William Cavendish, 4th Duke of Devonshire in 1761	Chatsworth House, Devonshire Collection	67/119
	Bacchanal with guitar player or The Great Bacchanal	1627–1628	121 × 175 cm	Acquired by cardinal de Richelieu then shifted to the French royal collection	Paris, musée du Louvre	55/140
	Echo and Narcissus	1628	74 x 100 cm	Acquired by Louis XIV before 1683	Paris, musée du Louvre	57/151
	The Death of Germanicus	1628	146 x 195 cm	Painted for cardinal Francesco Barberini. Owned by his heirs until its sale to present owner in 1958	Minneapolis, Institute of Arts	58/156
	The Triumph of Flora	1628	165 x 241 cm	Owned by cardinal Omodei. Acquired in 1684–1685 by Louis XIV	Paris, musée du Louvre	56/154
	The Massacre of the Innocents	1628	97 x 132 cm	Attribution supported by Blunt but rejected by Thuillier	Paris, musée du Petit Palais	B2/66
	The Martyrdom of Saint Erasmus	1628–1629	99 x 74 cm	Modello for the painting intended for St Peter's in Rome. Formerly in the Barberini collection, entered its present owner's collection in 1972	Ottawa, National Museum of Canada	68/98
	The Martyrdom of Saint Erasmus	1628–1629	320 x 186 cm	Commissioned in 1628 at the instigation of cardinal Francesco Barberini for a side chapel of Saint Peter's Basilica	Rome, Pinacoteca Vaticana	69/97
	Midas before Bacchus	1628–1629	98 x 130 cm	Located in Munich from 1787	Munich, Alte Pinakothek	65/R89
	Diana and Endymion	1628–1630 (vers)	122 x 169 cm	Possibly formerly in the collection Jules Mazarin then of Joseph Fesch. Several repaintings by Poussin	Detroit, Institute of Arts	66/149
	Mars and Venus	1628–1630 c.	155 x 213 cm	Formerly in the Dal Pozzo collection	Boston, Museum of Fine Arts	61/183
	The Inspiration of the Poet	1629	183 x 213 cm	In Thomas Charles Hope's collection in 1824, bought by the Louvre in 1911. Largely reworked, by Poussin himself.	Paris, musée du Louvre	79/124
	Saint James the Great's vision of the Virgin Mary	1629–1630 c.	301 × 242 cm	Possibly painted as an altarpiece for the église Saint-Jacques in Valenciennes. Bought by the duc de Richelieu then entered the French royal collection in 1665	Paris, musée du Louvre	75/102
	Holy Family with St John the Baptist	1629–1630	101 x 75,5 cm	Formerly in the collection of Heinrich Thyssen	Karlsruhe, Staatliche Kunsthalle	74/48
	Moses sweetening the bitter waters of Marah	1629–1630 (vers)	152 x 210 cm	Entered Simon Harcourt, 1st Earl Harcourt's collection in England in 1755. Sold at auction in 1948.	Baltimore, Museum of Art	76/28
	The Return from Egypt	1629–1630 c.	112 x 94 cm	Possibly the first version of the painting now in Cleveland	London, Dulwich Picture Gallery	77/68
	The Holy Family or The Rest on the Flight into Egypt	1629–1630 c.	76 x 63 cm	Formerly in the collection of Dr and Mrs Rudolph Heinemann, given to the museum in 1996	New York, Metropolitan Museum of Art	78/63
	The Triumph of David or David the victor	1629–1630 c.	100 x 130 cm	Collection of cardinal Girolamo Casanate from 1664	Madrid, Prado	73/34
	The Rest on the Flight into Egypt	1630 c.	88 x 67 cm	Possibly from Pierre Crozat's collection, moved to England in the 19th century	Winterthour, Musée Oskar Reinhart « Am Römerholz »	80/64
	The Assumption of the Virgin	1630–1632 c.	134,4 × 98,1 cm	Attribution supported by Blunt but rejected by Thuillier and Rosenberg (1994)	Washington, National Gallery of Art	B20/92
	Children and dogs	1630–1633 c.	67,5 x 50 cm	Fragment d'une plus grande toile dont le sujet reste inconnu. In Pierre Crozat's collection, collection acquired by Catherine II of Russia	Saint-Petersburg, Hermitage Museum	32/195
	The Plague of Ashdod or The Philistines struck by plague	1631	148 x 198 cm	Finished at the end of 1630 and sold for 110 écus. Formerly in the collection of Cardinal Richelieu	Paris, musée du Louvre	81/32
	Nymph riding a goat or Venus, faun and putti	1631 c.	72 x 56 cm		Saint-Petersburg, Hermitage Museum	82/199
	Children and putti playing	1631 c.	95 x 72 cm	Possibly from the collection of Pierre Crozat, which was sold to Catherine II of Russia	Saint-Petersburg, Hermitage Museum	83/196
	The Empire of Flora or The Garden of Flora or The flower garden	1631	131 x 181 cm	Sold for 100 écus. Collections of the elector of Saxony from 1722	Dresden, Gemäldegalerie Alte Meister	84/155
	Tancred and Erminia	1631	98 x 147 cm	Acquired in Paris in 1765 by Catherine II of Russia	Saint-Petersburg, Hermitage Museum	86/206
	Parnassus or Apollo and the muses	1631–1632	145 x 197 cm	In the Spanish royal collection from 1746	Madrid, Prado	85/129
	The Triumph of David	1631–1633 c.	117 x 146 cm	Provenance prior to acquisition by Dulwich unknown. Attribution doubted by Mahon, Blunt and Thuillier	London, Dulwich Picture Gallery	91/33
	Bacchanal before a herm	1632–1633	98 x 142,8 cm	Acquired in 1826	London, National Gallery	87/141
	The Return from Egypt	1632–1633	134 x 99 cm	From the collection of the prince of Liechtenstein, sold in 1952	Cleveland, Museum of Art	89/
	The miraculous translation of saint Rita of Cascia or The Virgin protecting Spoleto	1633 c.	48 x 37 cm	Oil on wood	London, Dulwich Picture Gallery	97/94
	Adoration of the Magi	1633	160 x 182 cm	Acquired in 1742 in Paris by Augustus of Saxony. Signed Accad. rom. Nicolaus Pusin faciebat Romae 1633	Dresden, Gemäldegalerie Alte Meister	93/44
	Adoration of the Shepherds	1633–1634	98 x 74 cm	Possibly from the collection of Joshua Reynolds, passed to the Beauchamp family, entered the National Gallery in 1957. Signed N. Poussin fe. sur la pierre au premier plan.	London, National Gallery	92/40
	A Dance to the Music of Time	1633–1634 c.	83 x 105 cm	Painted for cardinal Ropigliosi, later pope Clement IX, on a theme outlined by the commissioner. Passed to the collections of the Marquess of Hertford and Richard Wallace	London, Wallace Collection	141/121
	The Rape of the Sabine Women	1633–1634 or 1637–1638	159 x 206 cm	According to Blunt, this version is older than that owned by the Metropolitan; according to Thuillier, it is the younger of the two	Paris, musée du Louvre	131/179
	Saint John baptising in the Jordan or Saint John baptising the people	1633–1634 c.	95 x 120 cm	Dal Pozzo collection, passed into the collection of the Dukes of Rutland in 1785. Belonged to the Fondation et Collection Emil G. Bührle for a time, then acquired by the Getty in 1971	Los Angeles, Getty Center	94/70
	Rinaldo's Companions	1633–1634 c.	119 x 101 cm	Dal Pozzo collection. Acquired by the museum in 1977.	New York, Metropolitan Museum of Art	106/205
	Moses making water pour from the rock or The striking of the rock	1633–1635	97 × 133 cm	Collection of Jean-Baptiste Colbert de Seignelay then in the Galerie d'Orléans of the Palais-Royal, and finally bought by Francis Egerton, 3rd Duke of Bridgewater. Still owned by Egerton's successors and inheritors.	Edinburgh, National Gallery of Scotland (loan)	101/22
	Landscape with a man frightened by a snake	1633–1635 c.	65 x 76 cm	Acquired around 1920 in Paris by Duncan Grant. Owned by Anthony Blunt avant sa vente au musée.	Montréal, Museum of Fine Arts	96/215
	Children playing	1633–1635 c.	52 x 39 cm	Formerly in the collection of the Duke of Westminster	Lisbon, Museu Calouste Gulbenkian	104/R109
	Venus presenting arms to Aeneas	1633–1635 c.	107 x 133 cm	Formerly in the collection of the prince of Cellamare	Toronto, musée des beaux-arts de l'Ontario	107/190
	Tancred and Erminia	1634 c. (or 1638–1639)	75 x 100 cm	Bought in Paris in 1717 by James Thornhill. Acquired by the Institute in 1938	Birmingham, Barber Institute of Fine Arts	143/207
	The Rape of the Sabine Women	1634	154,5 x 210 cm	Formerly in the collection of Marie-Madeleine de Vignerot d'Aiguillon.	New York, Metropolitan Museum of Art	103/180
	The Crossing of the Red Sea	1634	155,6 x 215,3 cm	Pendant to The Adoration of the Golden Calf. dal Pozzo collection. Property of the Earls of Radnor from the 18th century to 1945	Melbourne, National Gallery of Victoria	99/20
	The Adoration of the Golden Calf	1634	154 x 214 cm	Pendant to The Crossing of the Red Sea. dal Pozzo collection. Property of the Earls of Radnor from the 18th century to 1945	London, National Gallery	100/26
	The young Pyrrhus saved	1634	116 x 160 cm	Paid 70 écus for it on 2 September 1634 by a close contact of the pope. Passed into Richelieu's collection then the French royal collection in 1665	Paris, musée du Louvre	108/178
	Landscape with ruins or Landscape with an ancient tomb and two figures	1634 c.	72 x 98 cm	Attribution denied by Thuillier. Blunt attributes it to Jean Lemaire, Rosenberg attributes it to Poussin	Madrid, Prado	R142
	Saint John baptising the people	1634–1635	94 x 120 cm	Collection of André Le Nôtre, given to the King of France in 1693	Paris, musée du Louvre	102/69
	Camillus and the schoolmaster of Falerii	1634–1635 c.	101 x 137 cm	Owned by the princes de Schaumbourg-Lippe in the 18th century. Formerly in the collection of Prince Paul of Yugoslavia. Acquired by the museum in 1970	Pasadena (California), Norton Simon Museum	109/143
	Hymen disguised as a woman at a sacrifice to Priapus or Dance in honour of Priapus	1634–1638 c.	167 x 376 cm	Commissioned by the king of Spain, possibly the pendant to The Hunt of Meleager and Atalanta	São Paulo, Museum of Art	116/176
	The Hunt of Meleager and Atalanta or Leaving for a hunt	1634–1638	160 x 360 cm	Commissioned by the king of Spain, possibly the pendant to Dance in honour of Priapus.	Madrid, Prado	115/163
	Saint Cecilia	1635 c.	117,7 cm x 89 cm	Located at the Royal Alcázar of Madrid in 1734. Attribution rejected by Thuillier	Madrid, musée du Prado	B19/96
	The Destruction of the Temple in Jerusalem or The Capture of Jerusalem	1638	147 x 198 cm	Inscribed "Ni Pussin Fec" on the second shield from the right. Commissioned by Barberini to be given to the ambassador of the Holy Roman Empire in 1639	Vienna, Kunsthistorisches Museum	132/37
	The Triumph of Neptune or The Birth of Venus (Richelieu Bacchanals I)	1635 or 1636	97,2 × 108 cm	From a series commissioned by Cardinal Richelieu for his château of the same name.	Philadelphia, Museum of Art	110/167
	The Triumph of Silenus (Richelieu Bacchanals II)	1637	143,5 x 121,3 cm	From a series commissioned by Cardinal Richelieu for his château of the same name. Considered to be an early copy (1637) of a lost original by Blunt, Thuillier. Considered to be an original Poussin by Rosenberg. and the National Gallery.	London, National Gallery	111/138
	The Triumph of Pan (Richelieu Bacchanals III)	1635–1636	134 x 145 cm	From a series commissioned by Cardinal Richelieu for his château of the same name.	London, National Gallery	112/136
	The Triumph of Bacchus (Richelieu Bacchanals IV)	1635–1636	128,3 x 151,1 cm	Considered to be an early copy by Blunt and Thuillier. Considered to be a Poussin original by Rosenberg. From a series commissioned by Cardinal Richelieu for his château of the same name.	Kansas City, Nelson-Atkins Museum of Art	113/137
	The Seven Sacraments I : Confession (1)	1636–1640 c.	95,5 x 121 cm	Destroyed in a fire at Belvoir Castle in 1816	Destroyed	/108
	The Seven Sacraments I : Marriage (2)	1636–1640 c.	95,5 x 121 cm	Second in the series, preceded by Confession	Belvoir Castle, Leicestershire, Collection of the Duke of Rutland	125/111
	The Seven Sacraments I : Extreme unction (3)	1636-1640 c.	95,5 x 121 cm	dal Pozzo collection. Acquired by the Dukes of Rutland in 1784–1785. Acquired by The Fitzwilliam Museum in 2012.	Cambridge, The Fitzwilliam Museum	126/109
	The Seven Sacraments I : Confirmation (4)	1636-1640 (vers)	95,5 x 121 cm	dal Pozzo collection. Acquired by the Dukes of Rutland in 1784–1785	Belvoir Castle, Leicestershire, Collection of the Duke of Rutland	127/106
	The Seven Sacraments I : The Commissioning (5) (or Ordination)	1636–1640 c.	95,5 x 121 cm	dal Pozzo collection. Acquired by the Dukes of Rutland in 1784–1785. Attempted sale in 2010 (estimate of £15 million) Acquired by Kimbell Art Museum in 2011.	Fort Worth, Kimbell Art Museum	128/110
	The Seven Sacraments I : The Eucharist (6)	1636-1640 c.	95,5 x 121 cm	dal Pozzo collection. Acquired by the Dukes of Rutland in 1784–1785.	London, National Gallery	129/107
	The Seven Sacraments I : Baptism or The Baptism of Christ (7)	1636–1642	95,5 × 121 cm	Completed in 1642 in Paris. dal Pozzo collection. Acquired by the Dukes of Rutland in 1784–1785. Separated from the rest of the series following a sale in 1939	Washington, National Gallery of Art	130/105
	The Feeding of Jupiter or The Infancy of Jupiter	1636–1637 c.	96,2 x 119,6 cm	Appeared in the middle of the 18th century	London, Dulwich Picture Gallery	139/161
	Landscape with Juno and Argus	1636–1637 c.	120 x 195 cm	Cited in 1638 in the Giustiniani family collection in Rome	Berlin, Gemäldegalerie	95/160
	Camillus hands over the schoolmaster of Falerii to his pupils	1637	252 x 265 cm	Painted for Louis Ier Phélypeaux de La Vrillière	Paris, musée du Louvre	122/142
	Pan and Syrinx or Syrinx pursued by Pan and turned into a reed	1637	106,5 x 82 cm	Acquired by Augustus III of Saxony in Paris in 1742	Dresden, Gemäldegalerie Alte Meister	120/171
	Landscape with Saint Jerome	1637–1638	155 x 234 cm	Belonging to a series of paintings of hermits commissioned from artists resident in Rome by Philip IV of Spain to decorate his Retiro palace	Madrid, Prado	114/103
	Landscape with a man drinking	1637–1638 c.	63 x 78 cm	Possibly from the Dal Pozzo collection, reappeared in 1939. Pendant to Landscape with resting travellers	London, National Gallery	133/213
	Landscape with resting travellers	1637–1638 c.	63 x 75 cm	Possibly Dal Pozzo collection, reappeared in 1939. Pendant to Landscape with a man drinking	London, National Gallery	134/214
	The Israelites gathering manna in the desert	1637–1639	149 x 200 cm	Painted for Paul Fréart de Chantelou	Paris, musée du Louvre	135/21
	Finding of Moses	1638	93 x 121 cm	Previously belonged to André Le Nôtre and given to the King of France in 1693	Paris, musée du Louvre	136/12
	Theseus rediscovering his father's sword	1638 c.	98 x 134 cm	Architectural decoration painted by Jean Lemaire.	Chantilly, musée Condé	90/182
	The Shepherds of Arcadia (Et in Arcadia ego)	1638–1639	85 x 121 cm	Acquired by Louis XIV in 1685	Paris, musée du Louvre	137/120
	Saint Margaret	1638–1640 c.	220 x 145 cm	Possibly commissioned by Dal Pozzo for a church in the Piedmont	Turin, Sabauda Gallery	142/104
	Venus presenting arms to Aeneas	1639	105 x 142 cm	Painted for Jacques Stella	Rouen, musée des beaux-arts	138/191
	Jupiter suckled by the goat Amalthea or The Feeding of Jupiter	1640	97 × 133 cm	Collection of Frederick II of Prussia in 1786	Berlin, Gemäldegalerie	145/162
	The Continence of Scipio	1640	114 x 163 cm	Collection of Robert Walpole, collection acquired by Catherine II of Russia in 1772	Moscow, Pushkin Museum	146/181
	Landscape with saint Matthew	1640	99 x 135 cm	Sold for 70 écus on 28 October 1640. Left to Cardinal Barberini, acquired by the Gemäldegalerie in 1873. Pendant to Landscape with saint John on Patmos	Berlin, Gemäldegalerie	147/87
	Landscape with saint John on Patmos	1640	102 x 133 cm	Sold for 70 écus on 28 October 1640. Reappeared in 1930. Pendant to Landscape with saint Matthew.	Chicago, Art Institute	148/86
	The Institution of the Eucharist or Jesus Christ instituting the Eucharist	1641	325 x 250 cm	Commissioned in December 1640 for Louis XIII for the chapel of the château de Saint-Germain-en-Laye	Paris, musée du Louvre	149/78
	Time and Truth or dit aussi Time defending Truth against the attacks of Envy and Discord	1641	297 cm in diameter	Commissioned by Cardinal Richelieu for the ceiling of the 'grand cabinet' of his Parisian palace	Paris, musée du Louvre	152/122
	The Miracle of saint Francis Xavier or Saint Francis Xavier bringing back to life the daughter of an inhabitant of Cangoxima in Japan	1641–1642	444 x 234 cm	Commissioned by François Sublet des Noyers for the high altar of the Jesuit noviciate	Paris, musée du Louvre	151/101
	Holy Family	1641–1642	71 x 55,5 cm	Painted for the Order of Malta's ambassador to Rome. Acquired by the Institute in 1954.	Detroit, Institute of Arts	153/46
	Saint Paul's ascension to heaven	1643	41,5 x 30 cm	Painted for Paul Fréart de Chantelou	Sarasota, Florida, John and Mable Ringling Museum of Art	154/
	The Seven Sacraments II : Extreme Unction (1)	1644	117 x 178 cm	Series painted for Paul Fréart de Chantelou. Passed into the d’Orléans collection, which was broken up in England in 1798.	Edinburgh, National Gallery of Scotland, collection of the Duke of Sutherland(long term loan)	159/116
	The Seven Sacraments II : Confirmation (2)	1645	117 x 178 cm	Series painted for Paul Fréart de Chantelou. Passed into the d’Orléans collection, which was broken up in England in 1798.	Edinburgh, National Gallery of Scotland, collection of the Duke of Sutherland	160/113
	The Seven Sacraments II : Baptism (3)	1646	117 x 178 cm	Series painted for Paul Fréart de Chantelou. Passed into the d’Orléans collection, which was broken up in England in 1798.	Edinburgh, National Gallery of Scotland, collection of the Duke of Sutherland	161/112
	The Seven Sacraments II : Confession (4)	1647	117 x 178 cm	Series painted for Paul Fréart de Chantelou. Passed into the d’Orléans collection, which was broken up in England in 1798.	Edinburgh, National Gallery of Scotland, collection of the Duke of Sutherland	162/115
	The Seven Sacraments II : Ordination or Commissioning (5)	1647	117 x 178 cm	Series painted for Paul Fréart de Chantelou. Passed into the d’Orléans collection, which was broken up in England in 1798.	Edinburgh, National Gallery of Scotland, collection of the Duke of Sutherland	163/117
	The Seven Sacraments II : Eucharist (6)	1647	117 x 178 cm	Series painted for Paul Fréart de Chantelou. Passed into the d’Orléans collection, which was broken up in England in 1798.	Edinburgh, National Gallery of Scotland, collection of the Duke of Sutherland	164/114
	The Seven Sacraments II : Marriage (7)	1647–1648	117 x 178 cm	Series painted for Paul Fréart de Chantelou. Passed into the d’Orléans collection, which was broken up in England in 1798.	Edinburgh, National Gallery of Scotland, collection of the Duke of Sutherland	165/118
	The infant Moses trampling pharaoh's crown	1645	101 x 144 cm	D'Orléans collection, sold in England in 1798	Woburn Abbey (Bedfordshire), collection of the Duke of Bedford	156/16
	Crucifixion or Calvary	1645–1646	148 x 218 cm	Commissioned before May 1644 by magistrate Jacques-Auguste II de Thou then owned by the family of Jacques Stella. Acquired by the Atheneum in 1935.	Hartford (Connecticut), Wadsworth Atheneum	157/79
	Moses changing Aaron's rod into a snake	1645–1648 c.	92 x 128 cm	Pendant to The infant Moses trampling pharaoh's crown. Painted for Camillo Massimi	Paris, musée du Louvre	167/19
	The infant Moses trampling pharaoh's crown	1645–1648 c.	92 x 128 cm	Pendant to Moses changing Aaron's rod into a snake. Painted for Camillo Massimi	Paris, musée du Louvre	166/15
	Moses saved from the river	1647	120 x 195 cm	Acquired by Armand Jean de Vignerot du Plessis and entered the French royal collections in 1665	Paris, musée du Louvre	169/13
	Saint John baptising Christ	1648	30 x 23	Painted for Paul Fréart de Chantelou following a commission granted in 1645. Painted on cupressus panel	New York, collection Wildenstein	170/71
	Holy Family or Madonna on the stairs	1648	118 x 197 cm	The original according to the archives, with the version held by the National Gallery of Art in Washington only being a copy. Fraudulently exported from France and acquired by the Cleveland Museum, then jointly acquired by them and the Louvre	Cleveland, Museum of Art, Paris, musée du Louvre	172/53
	Eleazer and Rebecca	1648	118 x 197 cm	Passed into the hands of Armand Jean de Vignerot du Plessis then entered the French royal collection in 1665	Paris, musée du Louvre	173/8
	Landscape with the funeral of Phocion	1648	117,5 x 178 cm	Possibly painted for the Lyon businessman Jacques Sérisier. Pendant to Landscape with the ashes of Phocion	Cardiff, National Museum of Wales	176/173
	Landscape with the Ashes of Phocion	1648	116 x 178,5 cm	Possibly painted for the Lyon businessman Jacques Sérisier. Pendant to Landscape with the funeral of Phocion	Liverpool, Walker Art Gallery	177/174
	Landscape with a Man Killed by a Snake or The effects of terror	1648	119 x 198,5 cm	Copie ancienne au musée Magnin	London, National Gallery	178/209
	Landscape with Orpheus and Eurydice or Orpheus and Eurydice	1648	120 x 200 cm	Acquired for the French royal collection in 1685. Upper and lower portions cut off.	Paris, musée du Louvre	179/170
	Landscape with Diogenes or Diogenes throwing away his bowl	1648	160 x 221 cm	Collection of the Duc de Richelieu, acquired by Louis XIV in 1665	Paris, musée du Louvre	180/150
	Landscape with Polyphemus	1649	150 x 198 cm	Acquired by Catherine II of Russia in 1772 on the advice of Denis Diderot	Saint-Pétersbourg, musée de l'Ermitage	182/175
	The Judgement of Solomon	1649	101 x 150 cm	Entered the French royal collection in 1685	Paris, musée du Louvre	183/35
	The striking of the rock or Moses Striking Water from the Rock	1649	150 × 196 cm	Painted for Jacques Stella. Collection of Robert Walpole in 1733, acquired by Catherine II of Russia in 1779	Saint-Petersburg, Hermitage Museum	185/23
	Self portrait	1649	78 x 65 cm	Inscribed "Nicolaus Poussinus Andelyensis Academicus Romanus Primus Pictor Ordinarius Ludovici Iusti Regis Galliae. Anno Domini 1649. Romae. Aetatis suae 55" Painted for his friend Jean Pointel. Acquired by the Gemäldegalerie in 1821.	Berlin, Gemäldegalerie	186/1
	Self portrait	1649–1650	98 x 74 cm	Inscribed "Effigies Nicolai Poussini Andelyensis Pictoris Anno Aetatis 56 Romae Anno Iubilei 1650" Painted for his friend Paul Fréart de Chantelou. Acquired by the French national collection in 1797.	Paris, musée du Louvre	190/2
	Assumption of the Virgin	1649–1650	57 x 40 cm	Joined the French royal collection in 1685	Paris, musée du Louvre	188/93
	Saint Paul's ascension into heaven	1649–1650	148 x 120 cm	Painted for Paul Scarron, passed to the collection of Armand Jean de Vignerot du Plessis then the French royal collection in 1665	Paris, musée du Louvre	189/89
	Landscape with three monks or A Solitude or Landscape with saint Francis	1648–1650	117 x 193 cm	Collection of Paul of Yugoslavia. Early copy at the musée Ingres de Montauban	Belgrade, Beli Dvor (white palace)	191/100
	Landscape with a woman washing her feet	1650	114 x 175 cm	Painted for Michel Passart. Acquired by the Gallery in 1944. Early copy at the musée Condé de Chantilly	Ottawa, National Gallery of Canada	192/212
	The Blind Men at Jericho or Christ healing the blind	1650	119 x 176 cm	Painted for the Lyon silk merchant Reynon, acquired by Armand Jean de Vignerot du Plessis then by the French royal collection in 1665	Paris, musée du Louvre	193/74
	Holy Family	1650–c. 1651	97,8 × 129,5 cm	Acquired in 1942.	Cambridge (Massachusetts), Fogg Art Museum	195/54
	The Holy Family with Saint John and Saint Elisabeth in a landscape	c. 1650	94 x 122 cm	Painted for the wife of Nicolas Fouquet and joined the French royal collection in 1685	Paris, musée du Louvre	196/55
	Moses saved from the river	1651	116 x 177,5 cm	Painted for Reynon. Acquired jointly with the National Gallery, London	Cardiff, National Museum of Wales / London, The National Gallery	197/14
	Holy Family	1651	96,5 x 133 cm	Painted for Charles III de Créquy. On show at Chatsworth House until 1981	Pasadena (California), Norton Simon Museum	198/58
	Stormy Landscape with Pyramus and Thisbe	1651	192 x 273 cm	Painted for Cassiano dal Pozzo. Acquired by the Museum in 1931.	Frankfurt, Städel Museum	202/177
	Landscape in calm weather or Calm time	1651	99 x 132 cm	Pendant to The Storm at Rouen. Rediscovered in 1977. Held until 1997 at Sudeley Castle in Winchcombe (Gloucestershire)	Los Angeles, Getty Center	201/
	The Storm	c. 1651	99 x 132 cm	Pendant to the Getty's Landscape in calm weather du Getty. Reappeared on the art market in 1950.	Rouen, musée des beaux-arts	200/
	Ideal landscape or Landscape with buildings or Landscape with three men	1651–1653	120 × 187 cm	Mentioned in 1746 to be at the Royal Palace of La Granja de San Ildefonso	Madrid, Prado	199/
	Achilles on Skyros or Achilles among the daughters of Lycomedes	1651–c. 1653	97,5 x 131,1 cm		Boston, Museum of Fine Arts	204/
	Coriolanus	1652–c. 1653	112 x 198,5 cm	Seized from the émigré (Simon-Charles Boutin) on the French Revolution and sent to Les Andelys in 1802	Les Andelys, Musée Nicolas Poussin	203/147
	The Will of Eudamidas	c. 1653	110,5 x 138,5 cm	Painted for Michel Passart	Copenhague, Statens Museum for Kunst	206/152
	Christ and the woman taken in adultery	c. 1653	121 x 195 cm	Painted for André Le Nôtre and given to Louis XIV in 1693	Paris, musée du Louvre	207/
	Noli Me Tangere	1653	47 x 39 cm	Inventory of the la Granja palace in 1746. Its lost pendant was a Lamentation over the dead Christ	Madrid, Prado	208/
	Nativity	c. 1653	46 x 39,5 cm	Oil on wood. Pendant to the Munich Annunciation. Attribution to Poussin opposed by Blunt	Oberschleissheim, now the schloss Schleissheim (Bayerische Staatsgemäldesammlungen)	209/R19
	Annunciation	c. 1653	45 x 38 cm	Oil on wood. Pendant to the Munich Nativity. Attribution to Poussin opposed by Blunt	Oberschleissheim, now schloss Schleissheim (Bavaria State paintings collection)	225/39
	Moses exposed by the river	1654	150 x 204 cm	Painted for Jacques Stella. Collection of the Ducs d'Orléans before 1727	Oxford, Ashmolean Museum	211/
	The Death of Saphire (or Saphira)	1654–1656	122 × 199 cm	Acquired in 1685 by Louis XIV	Paris, musée du Louvre	210/85
	Esther before Ahasuerus	1655	119 x 155 cm	Painted for Sérisier, then in the Seigneley collection, then in the collection of the Ducs d'Orléans, finally acquired by Catherine II of Russia.	Saint-Petersburg, Hermitage Museum	212/36
	Holy Family	1655	172 x 133,5 cm	Walpole's collection before 1739. Acquired in 1779 by Catherine II of Russia	Saint-Petersburg, Hermitage Museum	213/
	Sainte Famille	1655	198 x 128 cm	Possibly commissioned by the Duc de Créqui. Formerly in the collection of the Earls of Yarborough	Sarasota (Florida), John and Mable Ringling Museum of Art	214/51
	Saints Peter and John healing the lame man	1655	126 x 165 cm	Painted for a treasurer in Lyon, Mercier. Collection of the Prince of Liechtenstein from 1924.	New York, Metropolitan Museum of Art	216/84
	Holy Family with saints John, Elisabeth and Joseph praying	1655	68 x 51 cm	Acquired in 1685 by Louis XIV	Paris, musée du Louvre	217/57
	Adoration of the Shepherds	1655 c.	96 x 134 cm	Collection of the Electors Palatine at Mannheim, inherited by the electors of Bavaria in 1777	Oberschleissheim, now the Schloss Schleissheim (Bavaria State paintings collection)	221/41
	Saint John baptising Christ	1655–1657	92 x 129 cm	Reappeared in 1911	Philadelphia, Museum of Art	220/
	The Rest on the Flight into Egypt	1655–1657	105 × 145 cm	Painted for Madame de Montmort, wife of Fréart de Chantelou	Saint Petersburg, Hermitage	219/
	Achilles on Skyros	1656	100,33 x 133,35 cm	Painted for the Duc de Créqui. Attribution supported by Blunt but rejected by Thuillier	Richmond (Virginia), Virginia Museum of Fine Arts	218/127
	The Birth of Bacchus	1657	123 x 179 cm	Painted for Jacques Stella, passed to the d'Orléans collection. Given to the Museum by Samuel Sachs in 1942	Cambridge (Massachusetts), Fogg Art Museum	226/
	Annunciation	1657	105,8 x 103,9 cm	Possibly painted for Dal Pozzo's funerary chapel in the basilica of Santa Maria sopra Minerva in Rome. Inscribed "Poussin faciebat. anno. salutis. MDCLVII. Alex. sept. Pont. Max. Regnante Roma"	London, National Gallery	228/
	The vision of saint Frances of Rome or Saint Frances of Rome announcing the end of the plague to Rome	1657 c.	125 x 102 cm	Painted for Giulio Rospigliosi. Reappeared on the art market after a disappearance of almost . Acquired by the Louvre in 1999	Paris, musée du Louvre	223/
	The Flight into Egypt or resting on the journey	1657–1658	146 x 216 cm	Reappeared in 1986, classified a 'trésor national'. Acquired in 2007, property of the musée du Louvre deposited at Lyon	Lyon, musée des beaux-arts	230/61
	Lamentation over the dead Christ	1657–1658 c.	94 x 130 cm	Acquired in 1882 by the Duke of Hamilton	Dublin, National Gallery of Ireland	229/83
	Queen Zenobia found on the banks of the river Arax	1657–1660	156 x 194,5 cm	Rospigliosi collection in 1713.	Saint-Petersburg, Hermitage Museum	233/
	Blind Orion Searching for the Rising Sun	1658	119 x 182,9 cm	Painted for Michel Passart. Collection of Paul Sanford Methuen. Acquired by the Museum in 1924	New York, Metropolitan Museum of Art	227/169
	Landscape with Two Nymphs	1659 c.	118 x 179 cm	Possibly painted for Charles Le Brun. Acquired with the Reiser collection by the Duc d'Aumale	Chantilly, musée Condé	231/208
	Landscape with Hercules and Cacus	1659–1661 c.	156,5 x 202 cm	Acquired by Catherine II of Russia in 1772 from Hubert de Brienne de Conflans	Moscow, Pushkin Museum	240/158
	The Four Seasons : Spring or Adam and Eve or The earthly paradise	1660–1664	116 x 160 cm	Series painted for Armand Jean de Vignerot du Plessis and passed into the French royal collection in 1665	Paris, musée du Louvre	234/3
	The Four Seasons : Summer or Ruth and Boaz	1660–1664	116 x 160 cm	Series painted for Armand Jean de Vignerot du Plessis and passed into the French royal collection in 1665	Paris, musée du Louvre	235/4
	The Four Seasons : Autumn or The grapes of the promised land or The Grapes of Canaan	1660–1664	116 x 160 cm	Series painted for Armand Jean de Vignerot du Plessis and passed into the French royal collection in 1665	Paris, musée du Louvre	236/5
	The Four Seasons : Winter or The Flood	1660–1664	116 x 160 cm	Series painted for Armand Jean de Vignerot du Plessis and passed into the French royal collection in 1665	Paris, musée du Louvre	237/6
	Eleazar and Rebecca	1660–1665 c.	96,5 x 138 cm	Discovered by Anthony Blunt in 1933 and bought by the museum on his death	Cambridge, Fitzwilliam Museum	239/9
	Landscape with Hagar and the Angel	1660–1665 c.	100 x 75 cm	Discovered in 1960 by André Chastel	Rome, Galleria Nazionale d'Arte Antica, palazzo Barberini	241/
	Apollo and Daphne or Apollo in love with Daphne	1664	155 x 200 cm	Incomplete on Poussin's death, given to Camillo Massimi. Acquired by the Louvre in 1869	Paris, musée du Louvre	242/131

== Bibliography ==
- Blunt, Anthony (1966). The Paintings of Nicolas Poussin. A Critical Catalogue. London: Phaidon. OCLC 1153562776 – via the Internet Archive.
- (in French) Jacques Thuillier, Tout l'œuvre peint de Poussin : Documentation et catalogue raisonné, Paris, Rizzoli-Flammarion, Les Classique de l'Art series, 1974, 136 p.
- (in French) Jacques Thuillier, Nicolas Poussin, Paris, Flammarion, 1994, 287 p. (ISBN 2-08-012513-3) – contains a summary of the 1974 work's catalogue
- (in French) Pierre Rosenberg, Nicolas Poussin (1594–1665), exhibition catalogue, Grand Palais, Paris, RMN, 1996
