= The Peasants Returning From The Fields =

Painting by Peter Paul Rubens

The Peasants Returning From the Fields
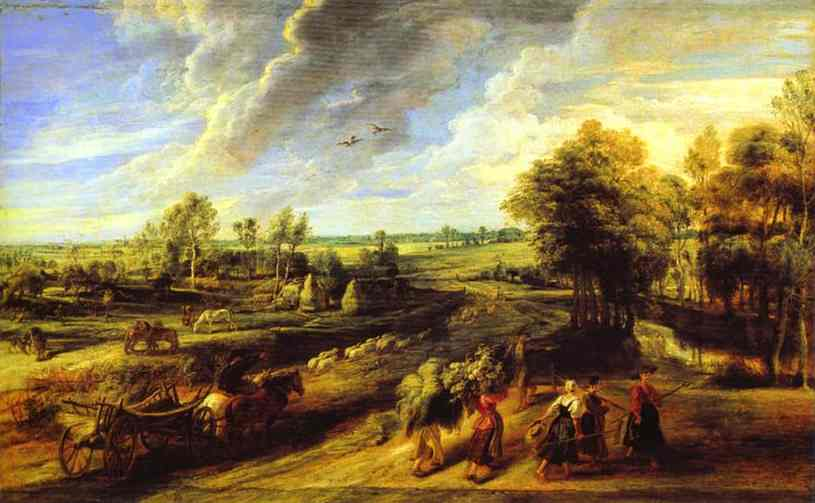
- Artist: Peter Paul Reubens
- Year: 1640 c.
- Medium: oil on panel
- Dimensions: 121 cm × 194 cm (48 in × 76 in)
- Location: Galleria Palatina, Florence

The Peasants' Return From The Fields is a c. 1640 painting by Peter Paul Rubens. It arrived in Florence in 1765 and is now in the Galleria Palatina in Florence.

== History ==
The dating of the work has fluctuated between 1620 and 1635, the year in which the painting was copied and the copy was signed and dated by its maker.

The most convincing hypotheses date the painting to the early 1630s. Some date The Peasants' Return to 1632–1634, when it would perhaps have been a collaboration with Lucas van Uden. Others to the latest phase of Rubens' production, in 1640. For the cart, the artist used two preparatory drawings. One (at Chatsworth House, in the collection of the Duke of Devonshire) depicts a reaper on the right, and the other depicts two carts (in the collection of the Kupferstichkabinett Berlin, n. 3237). There are other parallels between the second figure on the right and the peasant woman on the right in drawings at the Uffizi's Gabinetto dei Disegni e delle Stampe collection. Meanwhile, the five people on the right can be seen in a copy of the Reubens' in the Albertina museum.

The Peasants' Return has long been a pendant, a companion piece, to Odysseus on the Island of the Phaecians. Both panels were in the collection of the Duke of Richelieu in 1677 and, after some time in the Hapsburg collection, arrived in Florence in 1765 by the initiative of the Lorena family. The panels were brought to Paris by French commissioners in March and April 1799 and remained in France until the end of 1815. Even in the reports written by Canova and Karcher during French restitutions, they are described together.

== Description and style ==
The protagonist of the painting is the landscape, with the bucolic scene appearing as a simple pretext for the representation. The composition looks out from a high point onto the vista, on a countryside punctuated by trees and a horizon that falls, more or less, at the middle of the painting. Various people, in small scale, specify the moment of representation in the style of genre paintings by Pieter Bruegel the Elder. There are a series of peasants returning after work in the fields and a wagon with a man riding a horse that seems to stop for a flock of sheep along the road. Between the two women carrying hay and the rams, an artist pentimento is visible.

It is likely a landscape of Malines, interpreted as a serene vision of nature bathed in golden light. The sky is furrowed by bare canvas, which echoes the diagonal lines visible in the painting's lower half.

== Bibliography ==
- Chiarini, Marco (1998). Palazzo Pitti, galleria Palatina e Appartamenti Reali. Livorno: Sillabe. ISBN 978-88-86392-48-8.
