= Saint James the Great's Vision of the Virgin Mary =

Painting by Nicolas Poussin

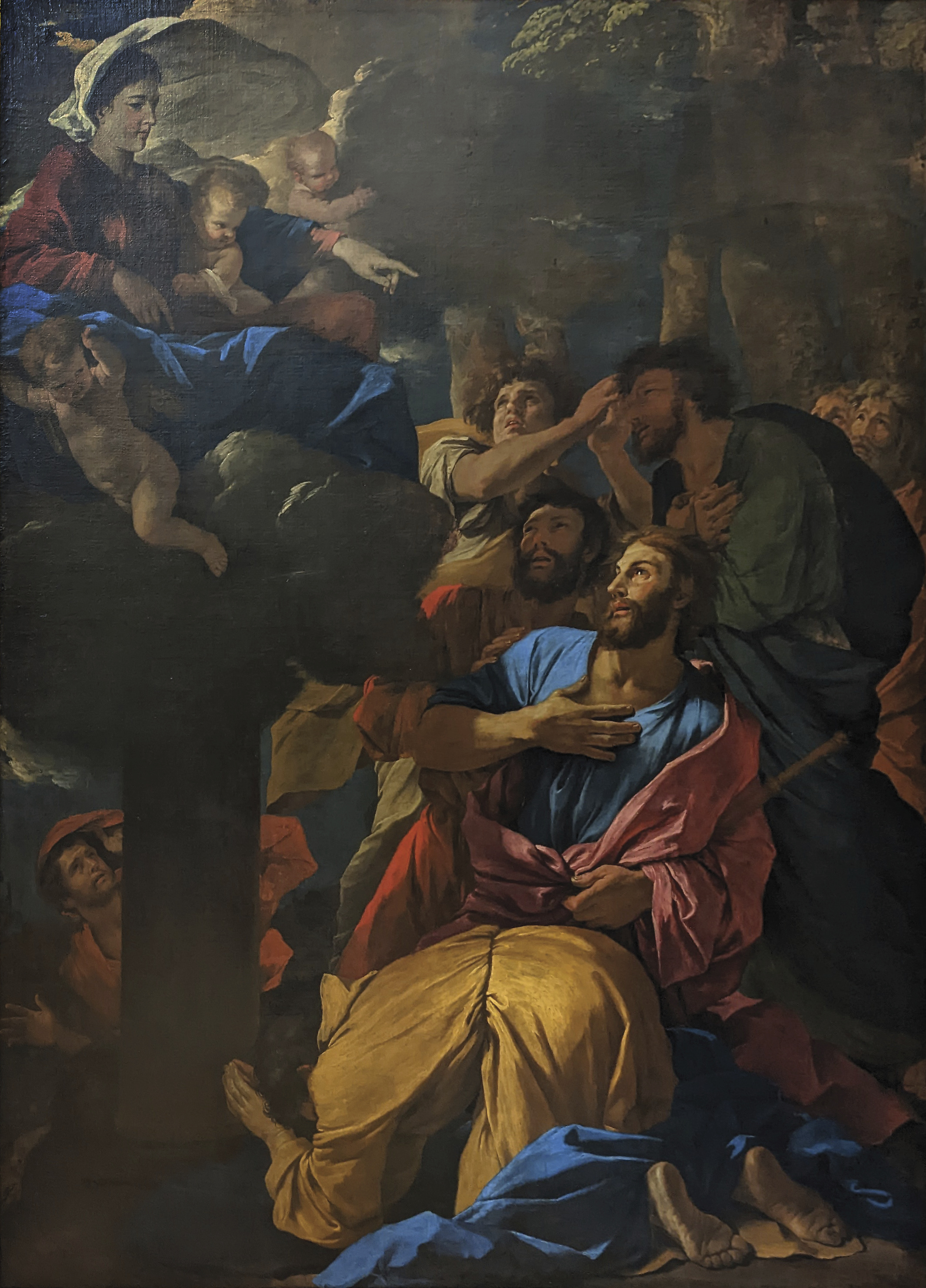
- Artist: Nicolas Poussin
- Year: c. 1629-1630
- Medium: Oil on canvas
- Dimensions: 301 cm × 242 cm (119 in × 95 in)
- Location: Louvre; Paris

Saint James the Great's Vision of the Virgin Mary (French - L'Apparition de la Vierge à saint Jacques le Majeur) is a c.1629-1630 oil on canvas painting by Nicolas Poussin, now in the Louvre, in Paris. It shows a vision in Zaragoza whilst James the Great was evangelising Spain.

== History ==
According to Poussin's biographer Giovanni Pietro Bellori, the work was produced for the town of Valenciennes, then in the Spanish Netherlands, possibly commissioned by a Spanish general as a church altarpiece, perhaps for the church of Saint-Jacques, though no precise location is known. Another biographer dates it to around 1630. It had entered the duc de Richelieu's collection by 13 October 1665, when it was admired there by Gian Lorenzo Bernini during his stay in Paris. The French king acquired it and twelve other Poussin works (including The Four Seasons) in December 1665.

It appears in an inventory of works owned by Charles Le Brun until his death in 1690 in the hôtel de Gramont near the palais du Louvre. Another inventory places it at the château de Versailles from 1695 onwards and specifically in its palais du Luxembourg in 1750. It was one of the works displayed at the Louvre when it first opened in 1793 and - though it was returned to Versailles four years later - it reverted to the Louvre in 1810.

== Description ==
The painting depicts an apparition of the Virgin Mary to James the Great, who demands him to go and evangelize Spain. The apparition takes place in the Spanish city of Zaragoza. Mary appears seated on a jasper pillar and surrounded by angels. The Divine inspiration takes the form of the wind that rushes into the Virgin's veil, while a light, also divine, illuminates the saint's face. The current painting is inspired in its composition by another Apparition of the Virgin to Saint James, painted by Carlo Saraceni for the Santa Maria in Monserrato degli Spagnoli, one of the national churches of the Spanish in Rome, now lost. Poussin's work is close in style to other of his contemporary canvas of similar dimensions, The Martyrdom of Saint Erasmus. Like the latter, it is one of the rare altarpiece paintings by Poussin.

== See also ==
- List of paintings by Nicolas Poussin
