= Van Halen (surname) =

Van Halen is a Dutch surname, and also the name of the American hard rock band Van Halen. Well-known individuals who have the surname include:

== Musicians ==
- Alex Van Halen (born 1953), Van Halen drummer
- Eddie Van Halen (1955–2020), Van Halen guitarist
- Wolfgang Van Halen (born 1991), Van Halen bassist

== Others ==
- Arnoud van Halen (1673–1732), Dutch painter
- Francisco de Paula Van Halen (1814–1887), Spanish painter
- Juan Van Halen (1788–1864), Spanish military officer
- Juan Van-Halen Acedo (born 1944), Spanish poet
- Peter van Halen (1612–1687), Flemish Baroque painter
