= Plague of Ashdod (Poussin) =

1630 painting by Nicolas Poussin

The Plague of Ashdod
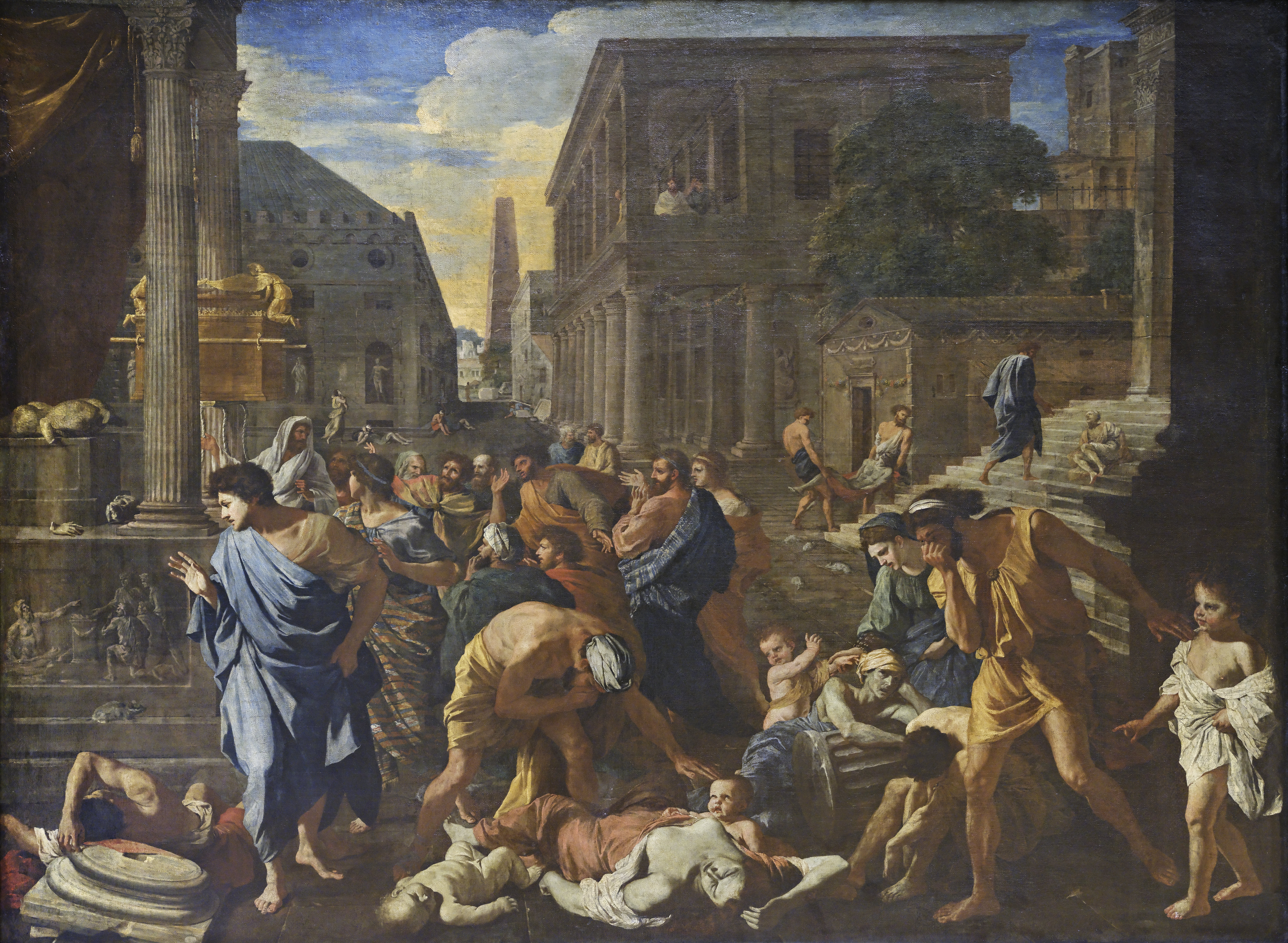
- The plague of Ashdod, 1630
- Artist: Nicolas Poussin
- Year: 1628–1630
- Medium: oil on canvas
- Dimensions: 148 cm × 198 cm (58 in × 78 in)
- Location: Louvre, Paris

The Plague of Ashdod is also known as The Miracle of the Ark in the Temple of Dagon, by the French artist Nicolas Poussin. The painting represents a story from 1 Samuel in the Old Testament. The original painting currently hangs in the Louvre in Paris. Poussin was commissioned to paint The Plague of Ashdod by Fabrizio Valguarnera. Fabrizio Valguarnera was a Sicilian merchant who was put on trial for laundering money through the purchase of this painting; he also commissioned more than one version of this piece. Poussin painted this during a plague that took place in Italy from 1629 to 1631, which influenced his accurate portrayal of the epidemic.

== Background ==
=== Artist ===
Nicolas Poussin was a French artist who was born in 1594 in Les Andelys, Normandy. Poussin's life ended in Rome in 1665. During the time that Poussin began working on this commission of the Plague of Ashdod, there was a terrible bubonic plague outbreak in Italy from 1629 to 1631. Poussin was then living in Rome, which the plague actually did not infect at this time; however, Poussin was still influenced by this epidemic when creating the Plague at Ashdod. Many who have studied this painting by Poussin have been fascinated with his advanced knowledge of the nature of the epidemic. Poussin wrote his Observations on Painting after 1627. His writings and observations included his understanding of the epidemic. It had valuable information that gave insight to the plague; however, the text was never completed. In these writings, Poussin discusses Aristotle’s concept of loyalty. To describe people who lack loyalty, Aristotle used the example of family members who murder each other due to contagion. Poussin describes how Aristotle wrote about family members murdering each other because of the fear of disease. Poussin symbolized this lack of loyalty by portraying a man ripping a child away from the corpse of the baby's mother. This might possibly lead to this man's own demise just like that of a child so attached to his or her own mother would become infected with the plague and die as well. This lack of loyalty is shown all throughout this painting.

== Subject ==
The subject of this painting comes from a story in the biblical Book of Samuel about God's punishment of the Philistines at Ashdod. Under the leadership of Samuel, a new war had broken out between the Israelites and the Philistines, during which the Philistines stole the Ark of the Covenant and brought it to their city of Ashdod, placing it inside their temple next tot the statue of their divinity Dagon (1 Samuel 5:2-3). God intervenes by toppling the idol of Dagon and sending epidemics and desolation to the people of Ashdod, as laid out the biblical text at 1 Samuel 5:4-6 followed by Poussin: "When [the people of Ashdod], there was Dagon, fallen on his face on the ground before the ark of the Lord! His head and hands had been broken off and were lying on the threshold; only his body remained. Now the hand of the Lord was heavy on the people of Ashdod and its vicinity, ravaging them and afflicting them with tumors. And when the men of Ashdod saw what was happening, they said, “The ark of the God of Israel must not stay here with us, because His hand is heavy upon us and upon our god Dagon.”" In Poussin's painting, the temple of Dagon appears on the left featuring a portico of fluted Corinthian columns. Between the columns we see the golden Ark, recognisable from the cherubim on its lid; to the left of the Ark we see the statue of Dagon lying prone on a base with its broken head and hand beneath it. The cadaverous bodies of a woman and baby lying at the foreground represent victims of the plague; men who approach them cover their noses in reaction to the miasma or bad air commonly associated with the disease. The rodents included in the painting may come from the additional line added to 1 Samuel 5:6 in some vernacular translations of the Vulgate known in Poussin's time: "He [Yahweh] brought mice [or rats] upon them, they swarmed in their ships. The mice went up into their land, an there was mortal panic in the city". Poussin himself called this art piece; "II miraculo dell'Arca nel tempio di Agon," meaning The Miracle of the Ark in the Temple of Dagon. This name refers to the temple of Dagon, which was destroyed in battle. Sheila Barker has written that this same battle in which the Ark of the Covenant was taken in this Biblical narrative. The theft of this Ark was believed to have unleashed God's wrath and started the plague.

== Interpretation ==
One interpretation of the story of Plague of Ashdod stems from a story of the stolen Ark of the Covenant by Philistines during battle. Because this Ark had been stolen, it was believed that plagues sent by the God of Israel ravaged the city, riddling the people with disease and death. The purpose of these plagues would be a punishment and cause for the Ark of the Covenant to be returned to the Hebrews from whom it was stolen. Poussin depicts rats throughout the painting running around the bodies of the living and the dead. According to Asensi; when the Philistines sent the Ark of the Covenant back to the Hebrew people, it was sent with a "guilt offering" consisting of five gold rats and five gold tumors.

=== Seventeenth-century depictions of plague ===
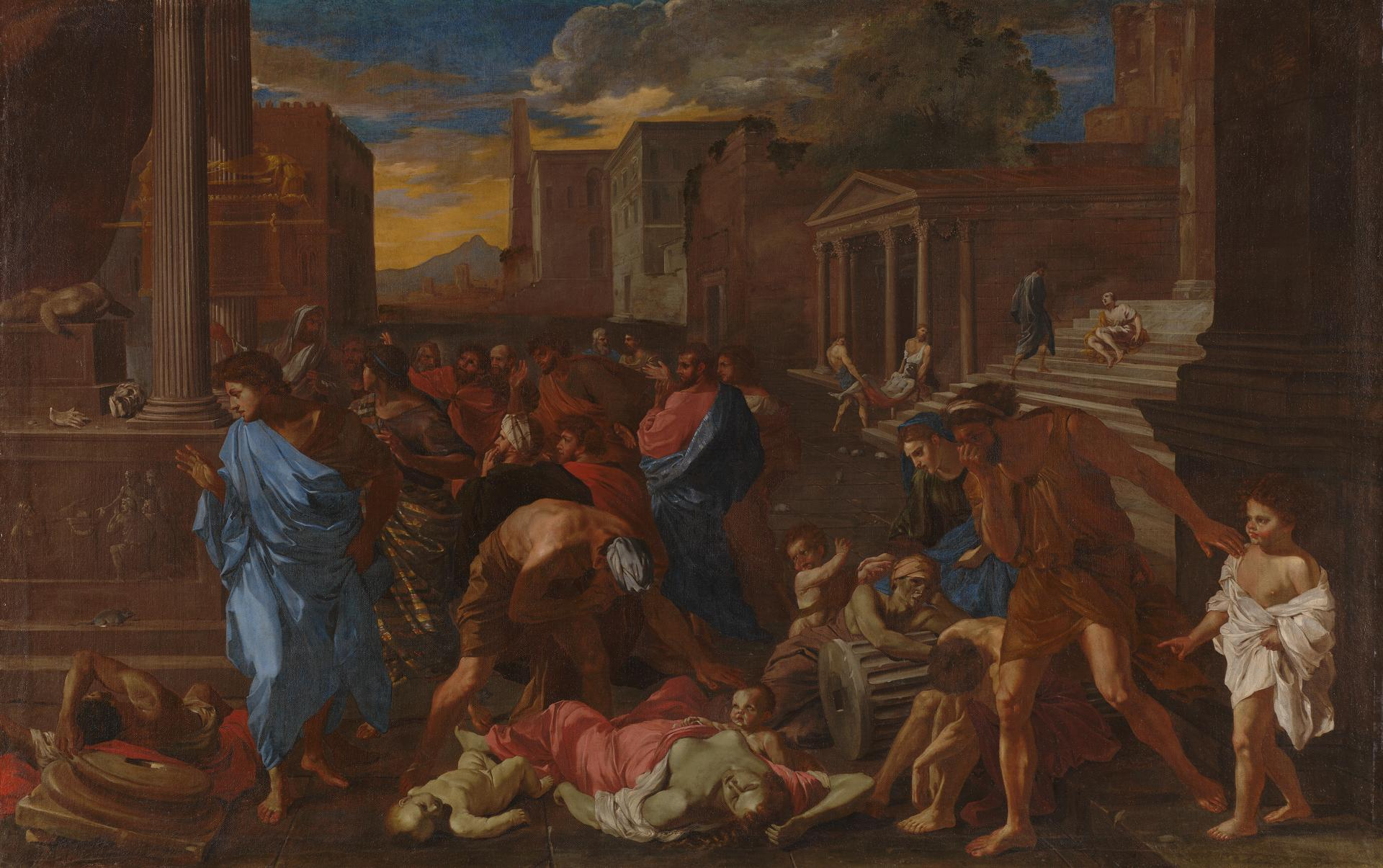
The Plague at Ashdod by Angelo Caroselli

Paintings depicting the plague are rare because, during the seventeenth century, a common belief was that viewing something such as a plague in art would have detrimental physical repercussions. It was believed that one would manifest what they were viewing and would literally come down with an epidemic such as the plague itself. So strong were these widely accepted beliefs, that this caused images of disease to be very unpopular. Poussin's depictions of the people gesturing to cover their noses show his belief at the time that the breath of plague victims could have been contagious, or possibly the fact that the stench coming from the dying and diseased people was so bad that others had to cover their noses in order to avoid the stench.

=== Accuracy ===
Plague figures that seem to be portrayed accurately are the hungry baby being pulled away from his dead mother's breasts, so that the baby would not become infected with the plague from the blood and milk of the mother. These images are particularly disturbing because people at this time would have been comforted by seeing the Madonna feeding her suckling baby, a symbol of life and safety for Catholics and Christians. To see this baby torn away from the infected mother seems almost inhumane. Pestilence could then be seen as unprotected by the Madonna and as life threatening. The man saving the child is risking his own life by doing so, which shows the courageousness of this figure. Poussin may have put this figure there to amplify the deep anger the viewer was meant to feel when viewing parts of the Plague of Ashdod. One problematic figure in this painting is at the bottom of the statue of Dagon: there is a large relief that has yet to be interpreted. There is also a woman carrying a toddler to the right of the Ark being watched by another man, who has also not been identified. The identification of the group of men that accompany the staring man is also unknown. According to Boeckl, these figures do not directly relate to the Biblical passage about the Plague of Ashdod, so these figures must be portrayals of Poussin's own interpretation of the epidemic.

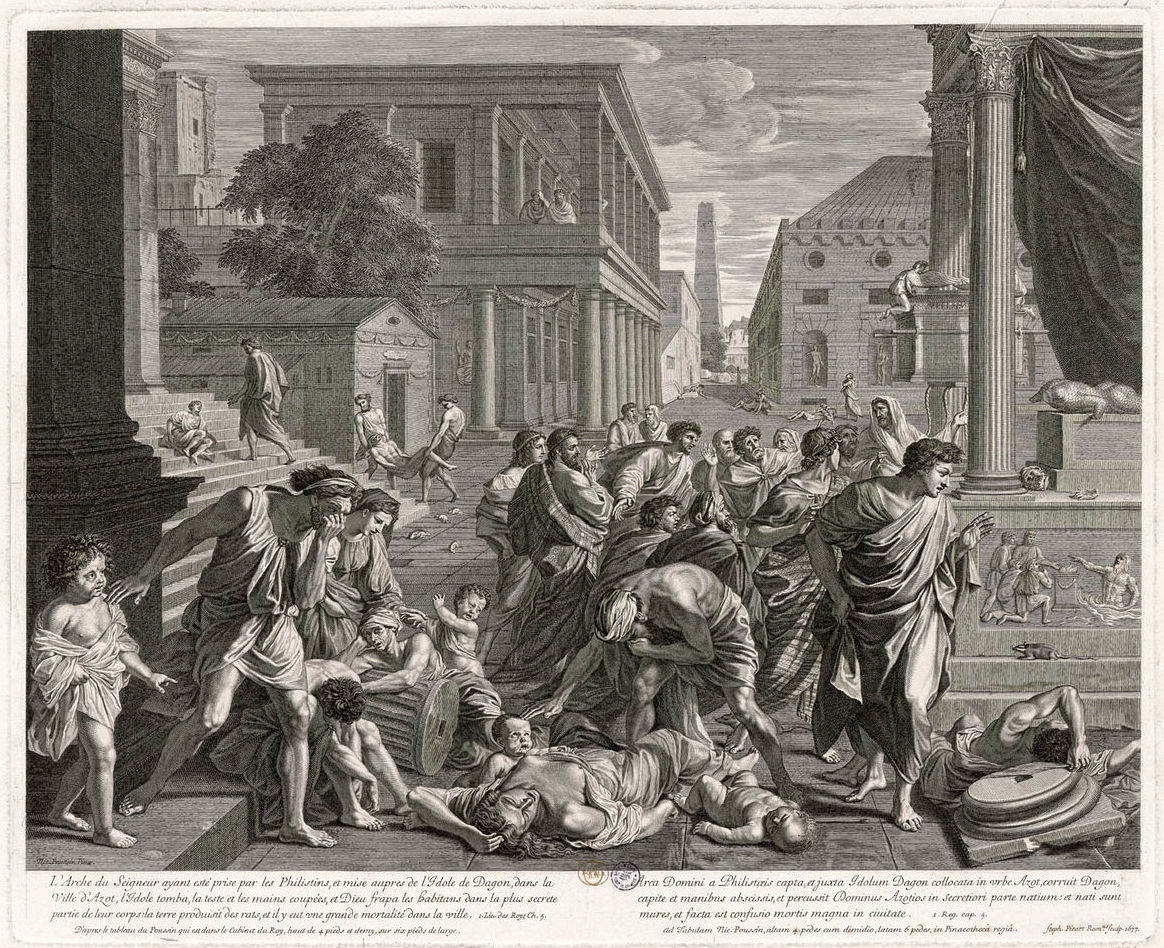
The Philistines struck by the plague by Étienne Picart, 1677

== Other versions ==
=== London version ===
In 1630, during the same time that Poussin was commissioned to paint this piece, by Fabrizio Valguarnera, Fabrizio was having an exact replica made before the first was even completed. This commission was given to Angelo Caroselli. Valguarnera's reasons for ordering this commission have been questioned. Ann Sutherland Harris writes that the London version of The Plague of Ashdod was used by Fabrizio Valguarnera to launder money from stolen jewels. According to Sheila Baker, Fabriozo Valguarnera was indeed seeking to launder his money through paintings when he visited Poussin's workshop in 1631. This was when he first purchased two paintings by Poussin, one of which was The Plague of Ashdod.

=== Engraved versions and drawings ===
A first engraving of the painting was made as early as 1631 by Jean Baron ón the basis of an intermediary drawing made by Guillaume Courtois. This is one of the few engravings made in Rome during Poussin's lifetime. André Félibien had another engraving made in 1677 by Étienne Picart.

Edgar Degas and Paul Cézanne made partial drawings after the painting.

=== Works inspired by Poussin ===
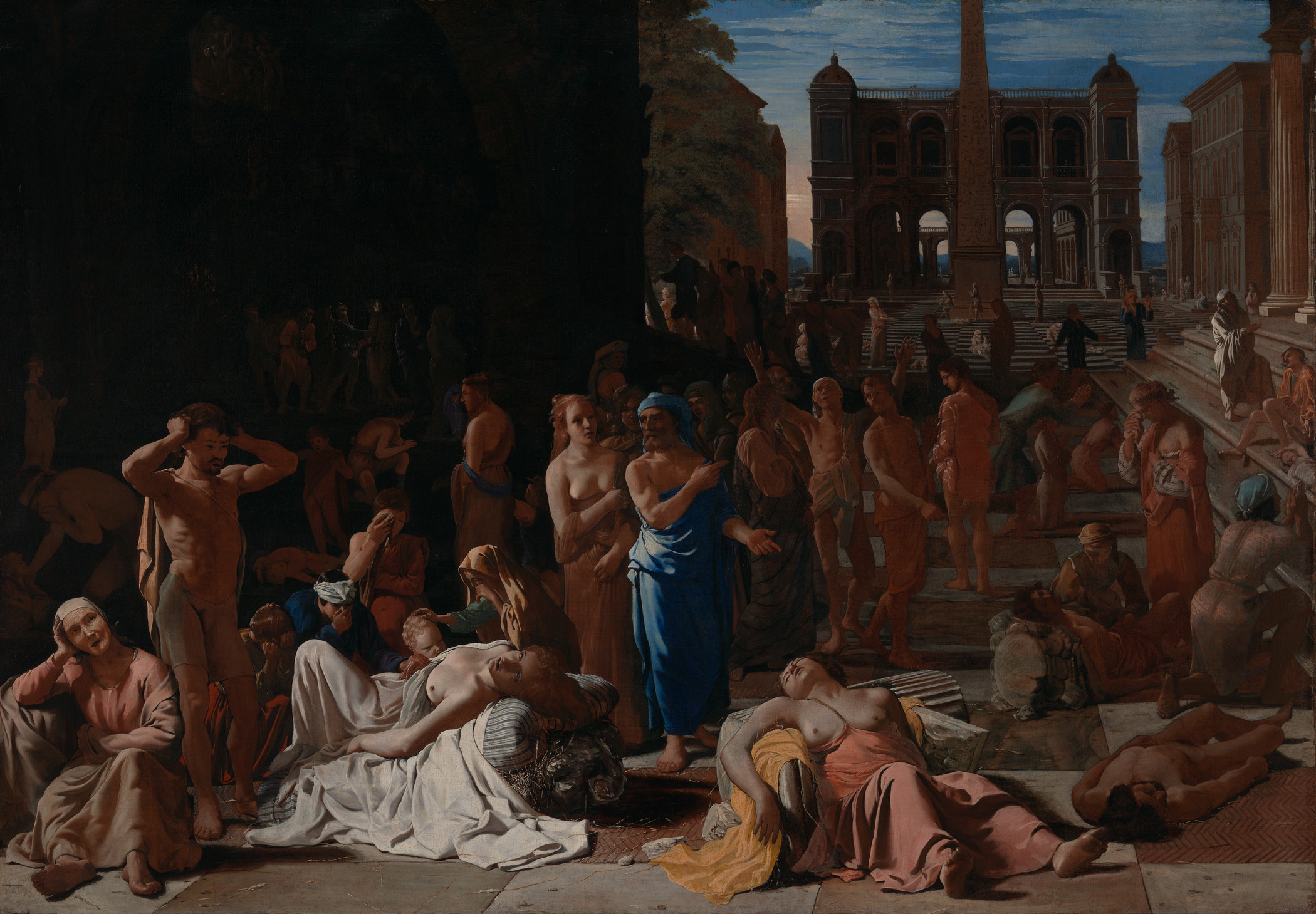
Plague in an Ancient City by Michiel Sweerts

Various artists were inspired by the painting to create depictions of the same subject, borrowing liberally from Poussin's imagery. The Flemish painter Michiel Sweerts is the author of a painting with a similar subject painted around 1652-1654 that was once attributed to Poussin. Sweerts' monumental Plague in an Ancient City (Los Angeles County Museum of Art) is regarded as his most ambitious work in terms not only of compositional complexity and technical achievement, but also of historical and archeological erudition. The composition depicts a haunting, dramatic vision of the ravages of the bubonic plague in a classical setting. It was clearly an attempt by the artist to prove his talent, both in the depiction of a historical scene of epic proportions that encompasses a broad range of emotional and in the depiction of psychological states, following the grand classicizing style of his older French contemporary and fellow-resident in Rome, Poussin.

Another Flemish painter, Peter van Halen painted in 1661 the Plague of the Philistines at Ashdod (signed and dated 1661, Wellcome Library), which was inspired by Poussin's treatment of the same subject, which he may have known through an etching. He used in his composition the temple architecture and figures from the composition of Poussin as well as some figures derived from works by Rubens.

== See also ==
- List of paintings by Nicolas Poussin
