= Armand Jean de Vignerot du Plessis, 2nd Duke of Richelieu =

Duke of Richelieu, French nobleman and naval officer

Armand Jean de Vignerot du Plessis
- 2nd Duke of Richelieu
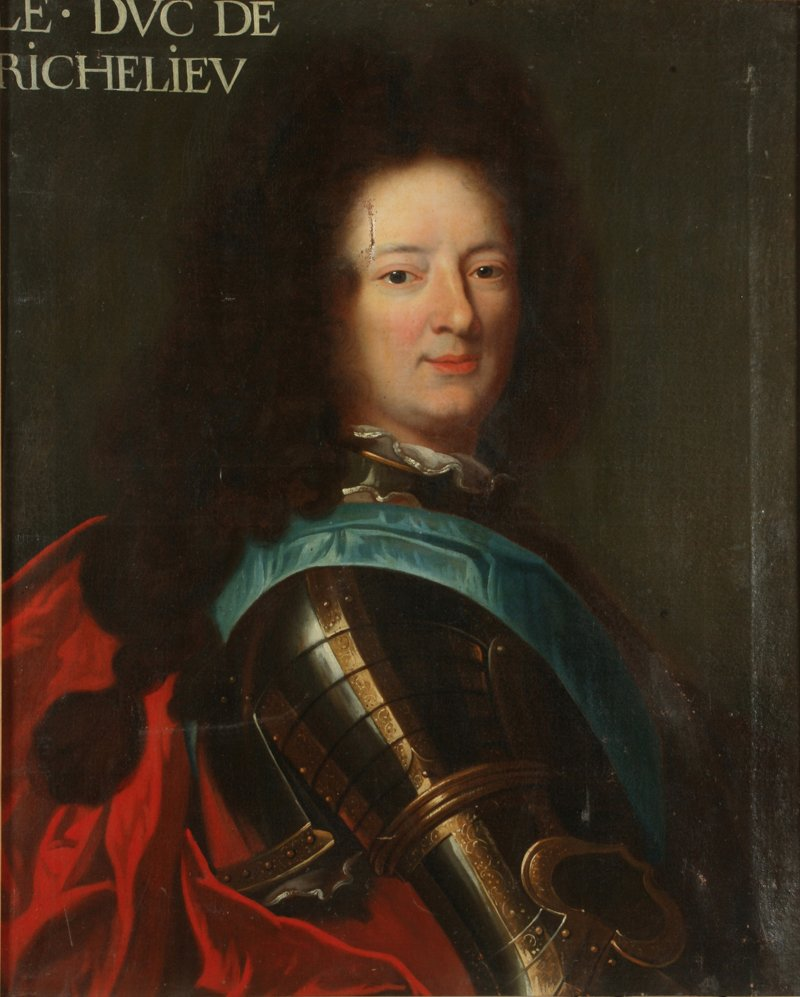
- Full name: Armand de Vignerot du Plessis
- Born: 3 October 1629; Le Havre, Province of Normandy, France
- Died: 20 May 1715 (aged 85); Paris, France
- Spouses: Anne Poussard; Marguerite Thérèse Rouillé
- Issue: Marie Catherine Armande, Countess of Clermont; Élisabeth Marguerite Armande, "Mademoiselle de Fronsac"; Marie Gabrielle Élisabeth, Abbess of Trésor Notre Dame; Armand, Duke of Richelieu
- Father: François de Vignerot, Marquis of Pont-Courlay
- Mother: Marie Françoise de Guémadeuc

Armand Jean de Vignerot du Plessis, 2nd Duke of Richelieu (3 October 1629 – 20 May 1715), was a French naval officer and nobleman. His surname has also been spelled Vignerod Duplessis.

== Life ==
His father was François de Vignerot (died 26 January 1646 in Paris), who was the son of René de Vignerot and Françoise du Plessis de Richelieu (died 1615), one of the sisters of Cardinal Richelieu. He was carefully raised with his two brothers under the direction of his father's sister, the Duchess of Aiguillon, who had a marked preference for him.

He became Duke of Richelieu by substitution and invested with the dignity of peer of France by the will of his great-uncle, Cardinal Richelieu, when barely thirteen years old at the latter's death in December 1642. He adopted the cardinal's surname of Du Plessis and also inherited part of the cardinal's art collection and library and his Hôtel de Richelieu (later known at the Palais Brion, just west of the Palais-Cardinal). Construction had begun in 1642 to house the cardinal's library but was unfinished at the time of the cardinal's death, when further construction halted.

Vignerot Du Plessis also became general of the galleys. He was sent to Naples, which had risen up against the Spanish and proclaimed the Neapolitan Republic. He joined up with Don John of Austria's fleet off Capri but was unable to land the troops he was transporting.

Vignerod du Plessis had through the efforts of his aunt been betrothed to Charlotte Marie de Lorraine, Mademoiselle de Chevreuse, a daughter of the Duke of Chevreuse and Marie de Rohan. Through this marriage the young duke would have the support the de Luynes, the de Lorraines and the de Rohans; three of Frances most powerful families.

But through the scheming of his relatives the Grand Condé and the Duchess of Longueville in 1649 he was introduced to a young widow Anne de Pons, née Poussard -Vigean who was the sister of the Grand Condés former mistress Marthe du Vigean.

Richelieu was attracted to Madame de Pons and through the encouragement of the Grand Condé, Richelieu and Anne were married by his private chaplain in December, 1649.

There were no issue from this marriage and Anne died in 1684.

Vignerot du Plessis secondly married Anne-Marguerite d'Acigné.

== Vignerod du Plessis as an art collector ==
Vignerod du Plessis was the owner of a collection that was admired for its quality by Gian Lorenzo Bernini when he visited Paris in 1665. Paul Fréart de Chantelou, Bernini's guide and the chronicler of his visit, mentions Nicolas Poussin's the Plague at Ashdod (1630–1631, Louvre), one of fifteen paintings by Poussin owned by the duke, among which were the Saint James the Great's Vision of the Virgin Mary (1629-1630, Louvre), Triumph of Pan (1636, private collection), the Apotheosis of Saint Paul (1649–1650, Louvre), and the Four Seasons (commissioned by the duke in 1660; Louvre). The duke also owned Titian's Virgin with a Rabbit (16th century, Louvre), Annibale Caracci's The Stoning of Saint Stephen (c. 1603, Louvre), and Parmigianino's Portrait of a Young Man (1584, Louvre).

Paintings owned by the Duke of Richelieu

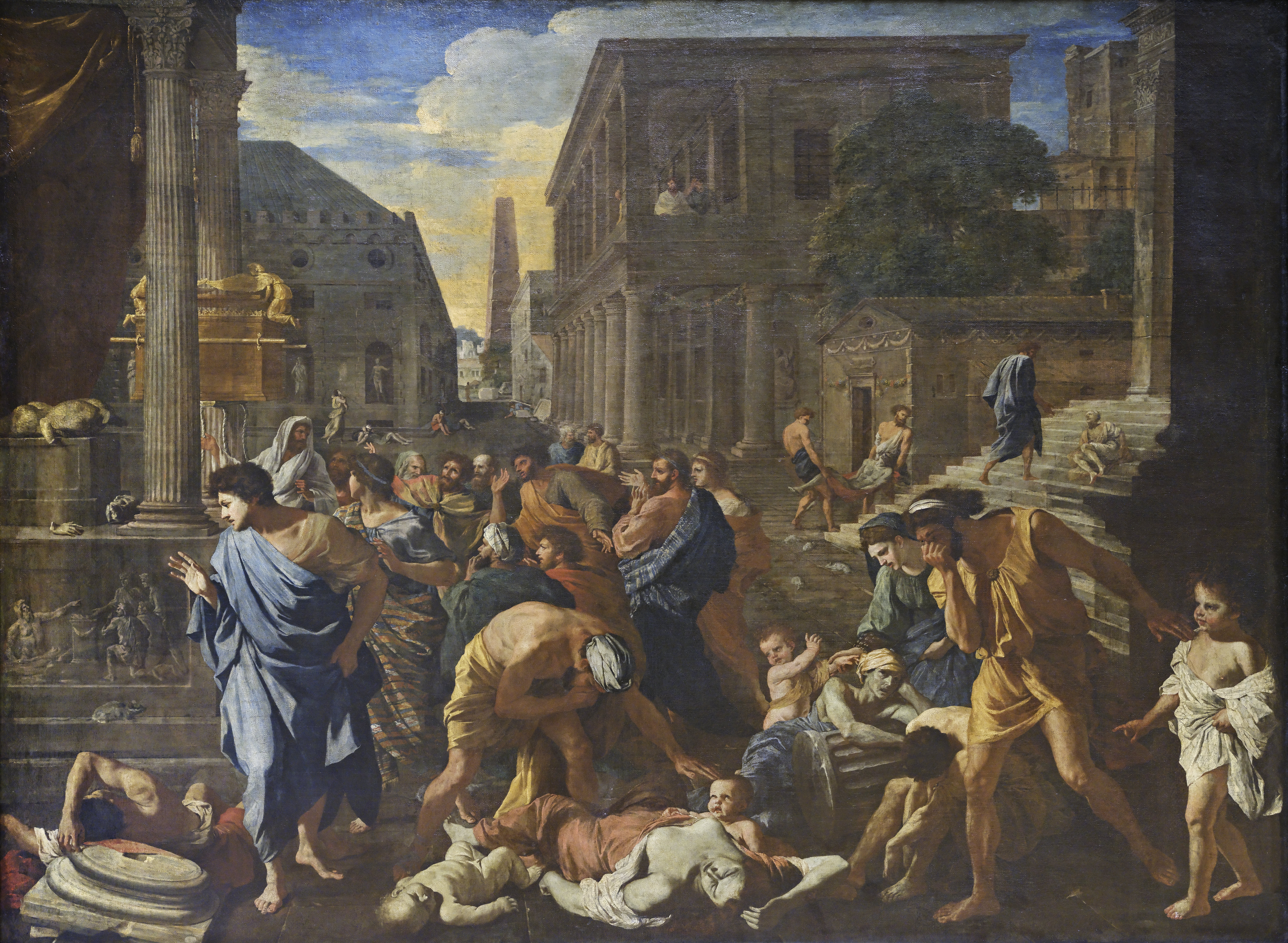
Poussin's Plague at Ashdod

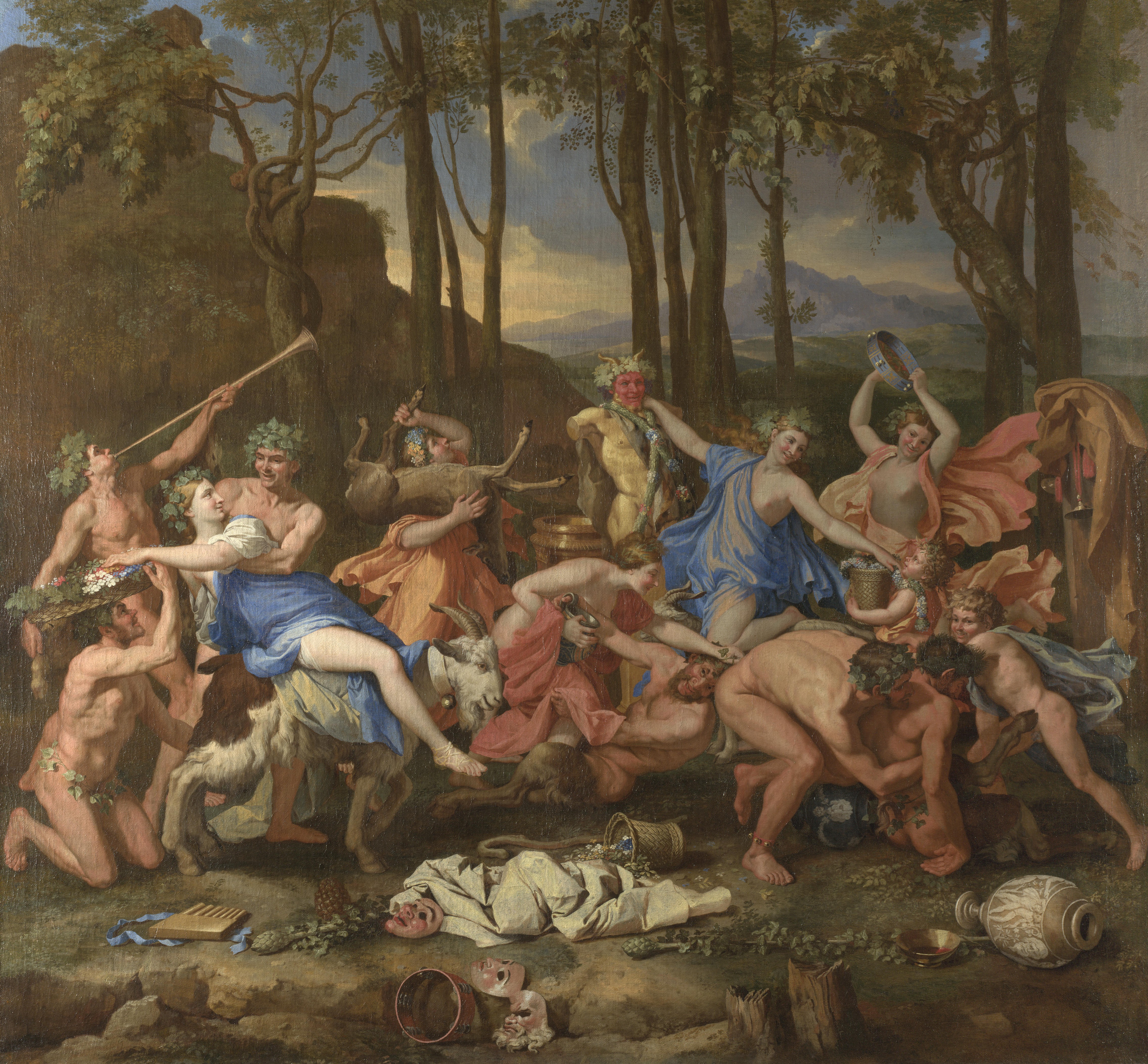
Poussin's The Triumph of Pan

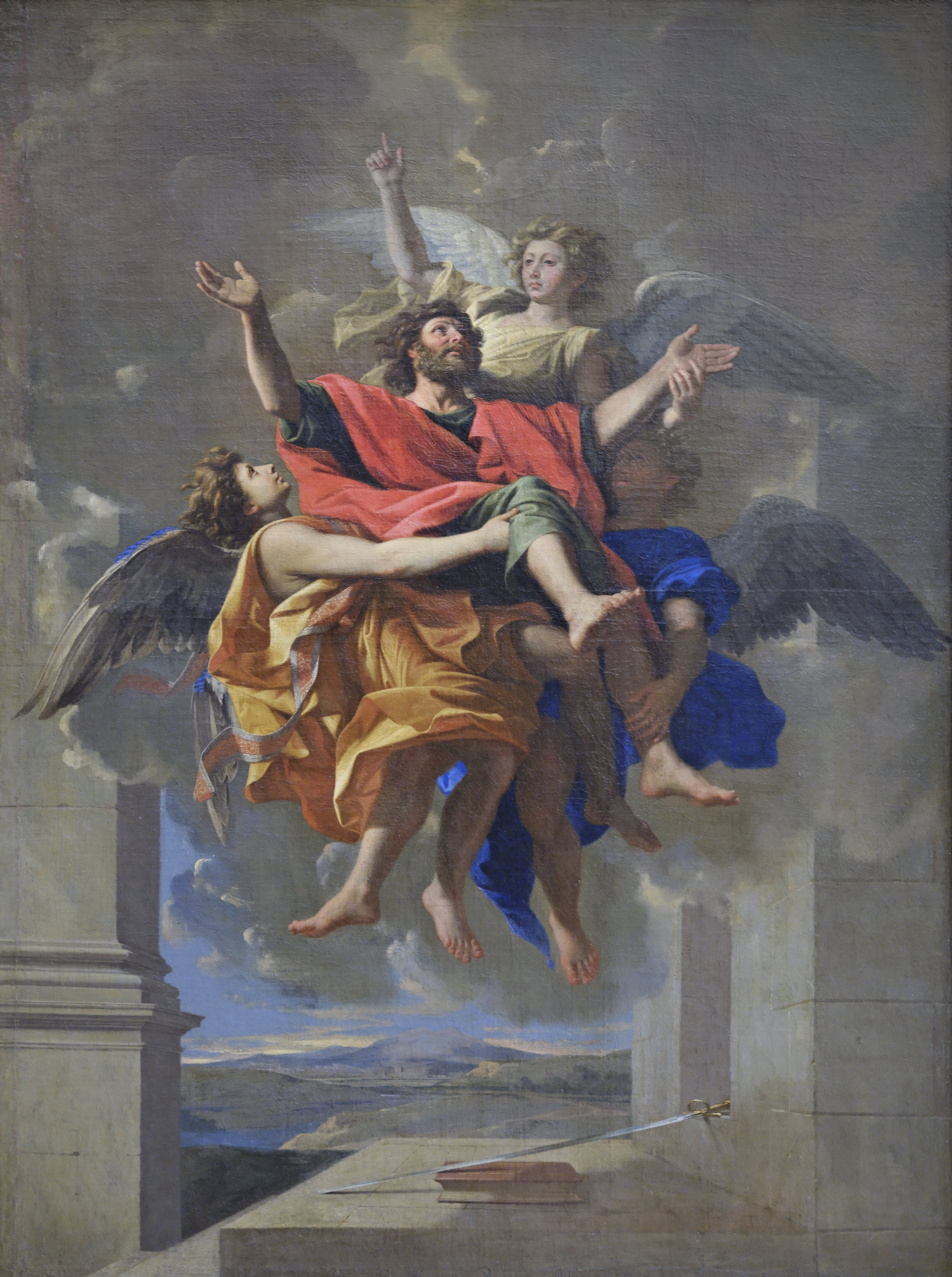
Poussin's Apotheosis of Saint Paul

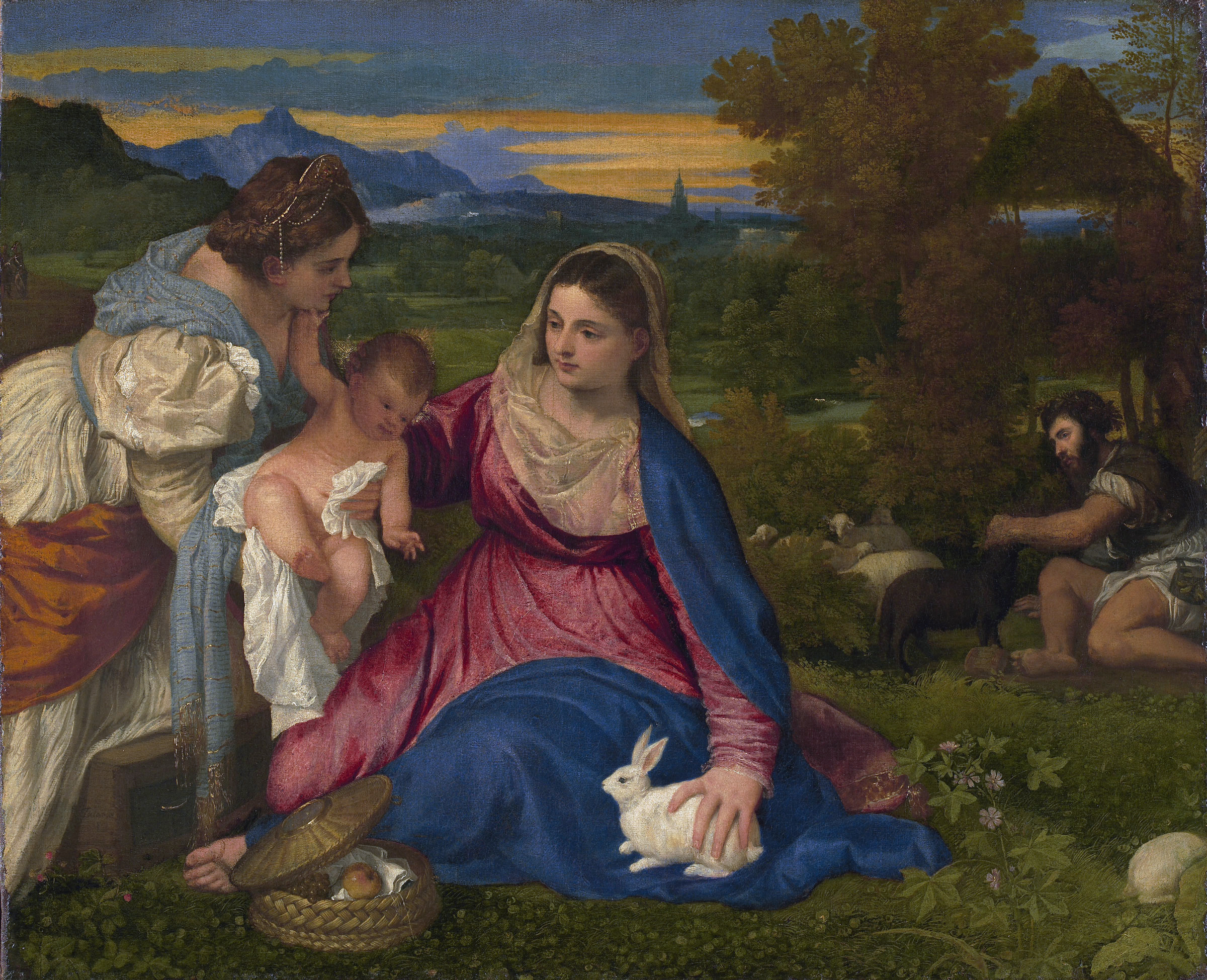
Titian's Virgin with a Rabbit

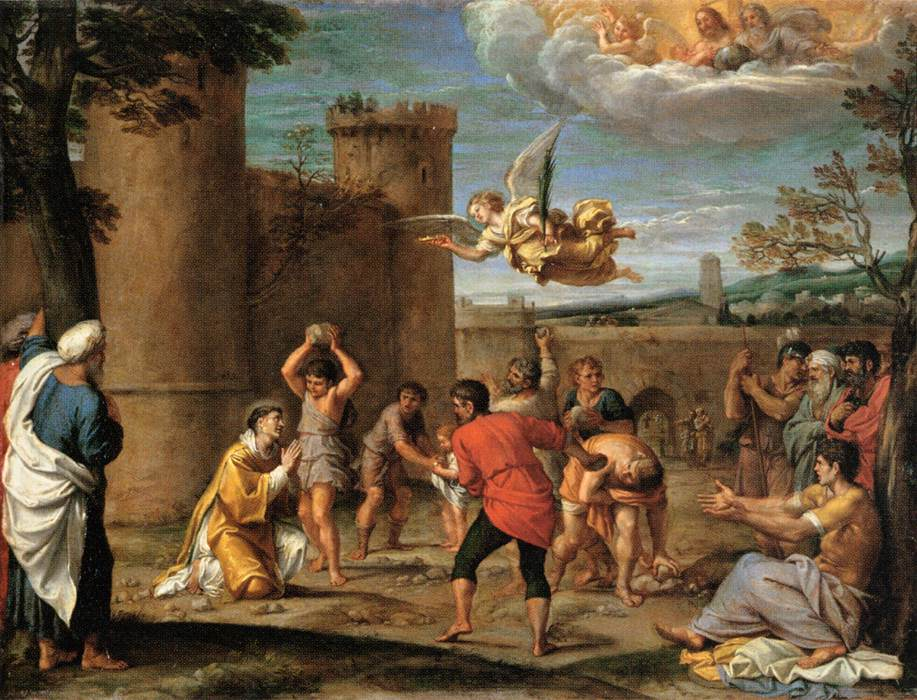
Annibale Caracci's Stoning of Saint Stephen

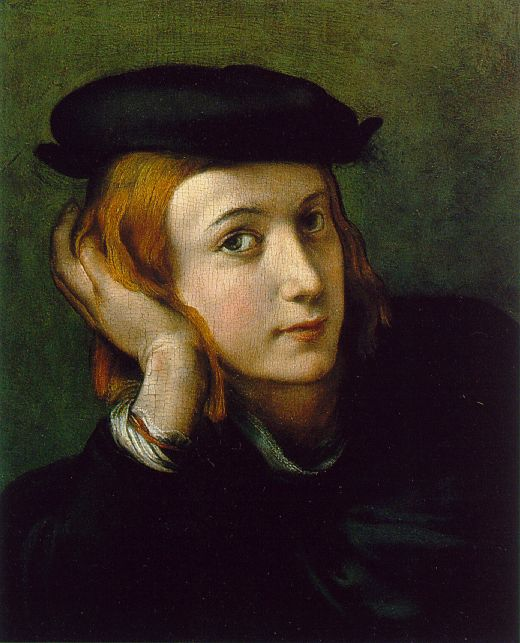
Parmigianino's Portrait of a Young Man

The duke commissioned Pierre Dulin to paint pendants to three paintings of pagan festivals by Poussin, including one to the Triumph of Pan. Dulin also made two large portraits of the Duke, one dressed as a Roman on horseback, the other of him in armour.

== Bibliography ==
- Aubert de La Chesnaye-Desbois, François-Alexandre; Badier (1863-1877). Dictionnaire de la noblesse, third edition. Paris: Schlesinger. Catalog record at HathiTrust.
- Bonnaffé, Edmond (1884). Dictionnaire des amateurs français au VIIe siècle. Paris: A. Quantin. Copy at Gallica.
- Champier, Victor (1900). Le Palais-Royal d'après des documents inédits (1629–1900). Tome premier: Du cardinal de Richelieu à la Révolution. Paris: Société de Propagation des Livres d'Art. Copy at HathiTrust.
- Thackray, Anne (1996). "Richelieu family(ii). (2) Duc de Richelieu [Vignerod Du Plessis, Louis-François Armand de]", vol. 26, p. 349, in The Dictionary of Art, 34 volumes, edited by Jane Turner. New York: Grove. ISBN 9781884446009.

French nobility
Preceded by Armand Jean du Plessis de Richelieu	Duke of Richelieu; 1657–1715	Succeeded by Armand de Vignerot du Plessis
Preceded by Claire Clémence de Maillé	Duke of Fronsac; 1674–1715	Succeeded by Armand de Vignerot du Plessis
