= The Four Seasons (Poussin) =

Series of four paintings by Nicolas Poussin

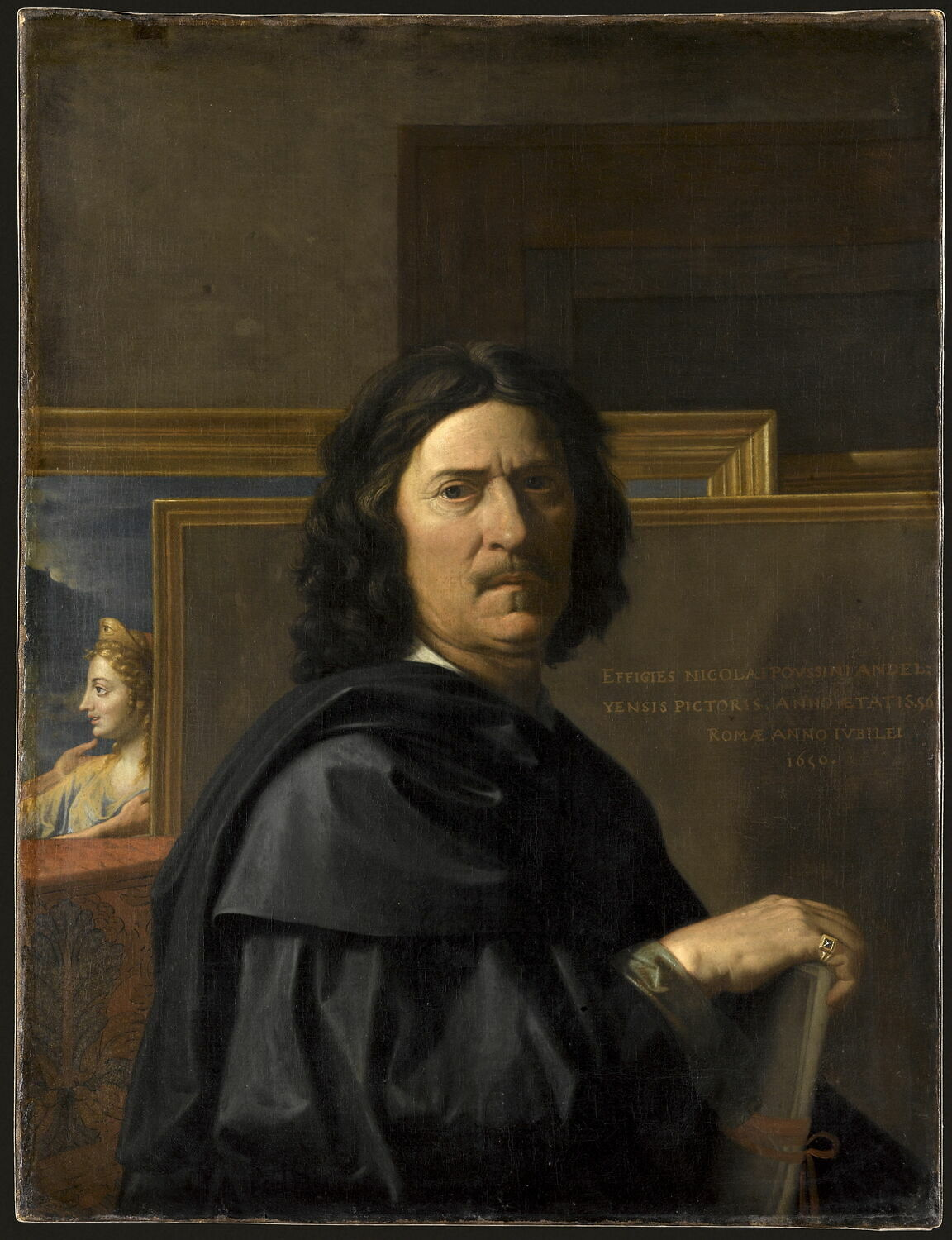
Self-portrait of Nicolas Poussin, 1650, Louvre

The Four Seasons (fr Les Quatre Saisons) was the last set of four oil paintings completed by the French painter Nicolas Poussin (1594–1665). The set was painted in Rome between 1660 and 1664 for the Duc de Richelieu, the grand-nephew of Cardinal Richelieu. Each painting is an elegiac landscape with Old Testament figures conveying the different seasons and times of the day. Executed when the artist was in failing health suffering from a tremor in his hands, the Seasons are a philosophical reflection on the order in the natural world. The iconography evokes not only the Christian themes of death and resurrection but also the pagan imagery of classical antiquity: the poetic worlds of Milton's Paradise Lost and Virgil's Georgics. The paintings currently hang in a room on their own in the Louvre in Paris. After Poussin's death, the series entered the collection of Louis XIV in 1665 as part of the acquisition of the Duc de Richelieu's gallery following a game of jeu de paume between the duke and the king.

By his absolute humility, by his effacement of himself, by his refusal to use any tricks or overstate himself, Poussin has succeeded in identifying himself with nature, conceived as a manifestation of the divine reason. The Seasons are among the supreme examples of pantheistic landscape painting.

— Anthony Blunt, Nicolas Poussin

Jamais peut-être, dans toute la peinture occidentale, des choses aussi nombreuses et parfois si difficiles n'avaient été dites avec une telle simplicité. Jamais un peintre ne s'était aussi pleinement identifié à l'ordre du monde. Mais cette identification n'est ni « une projection » ni une confidence : là est le sens de cette impersonalité que l'on a pu reprocher à Poussin, et qui fait sa grandeur.

— Alain Mérot, Nicolas Poussin

== Themes ==
chargé d'années, paralytique, plein d'infirmités de toutes sortes, étranger et sans amis ... Voilà l'état où je me trouve ... J'ai si grande difficulté d'écrire pour le grand tremblement de ma main ...

— Nicolas Poussin, 18 November 1664

The French born painter Nicolas Poussin had made his home in Rome since the age of 30. At the end of his life, from 1660 to 1664, he undertook his last set of paintings, The Four Seasons, a work commissioned by the Duc de Richelieu, grand-nephew of Cardinal Richelieu. Work on the paintings was necessarily slow, because of general ill health and the continuing tremor in his hands, which had affected Poussin since 1640 and turned him into a recluse.

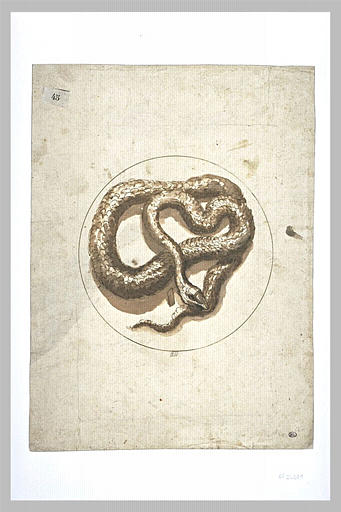
Nicolas Poussin, drawing of a serpent. 1630. Louvre

The Seasons are a continuation of Poussin's mythological landscapes, depicting the power and grandeur of nature, "benign in Spring, rich in Summer, somber yet fruitful in Autumn, and cruel in Winter." The series also represents successive times of the day: early morning for Spring, midday for Summer, the evening for Autumn, and a moonlit night for Winter. For both stoic philosophers and for early Christians the seasons represented the harmony of nature; but for Christians the seasons, often depicted personified surrounding the Good Shepherd, and the succession of night and day also symbolized the death and resurrection of Christ and the salvation of man (1 Clement 9: 4–18, 11: 16-20 s:1 Clement (William Wake translation)).

Departing from the traditions of classical antiquity or medieval illuminations, where the seasons were represented either by allegorical figures or by scenes from everyday country life, Poussin chose to symbolize each season by a specific episode from the Old Testament. For Spring he chose Adam and Eve in the Garden of Eden from Genesis; for Summer Boaz discovering Ruth gleaning corn in his fields from the Book of Ruth; for Autumn the Israelite spies returning with grapes from the Promised Land of Canaan from the Book of Numbers; and for Winter the Flood from the Book of Noah. In addition to the obvious seasonal references, some commentators have seen further less immediate biblical references. The bread and wine in Summer and grapes in Autumn could refer to the eucharist. The whole sequence could also represent Man's path to redemption: his state of innocence before the original sin and the Fall in Spring; the union that gave rise to the birth of Christ through the House of David in Summer; the Mosaic laws in Autumn; and finally the Last Judgement in Winter.

As well as this Christian iconography, the paintings could also contain mythological allusions to four deities of classical antiquity. In Spring, Poussin reuses the device of a rising sun, previously employed in the Birth of Bacchus to denote Apollo, the father of Bacchus. In Summer Ruth with her sheaf of corn could denote Ceres, the goddess of grain and fertility. In Autumn the grapes could be a reference to Bacchus. The serpent is a symbol used in Poussin's previous oeuvre. In Winter the snake slithering over the rocks could be an allegorical reference to the classical underworld and Pluto.

== Gallery ==
The Four Seasons
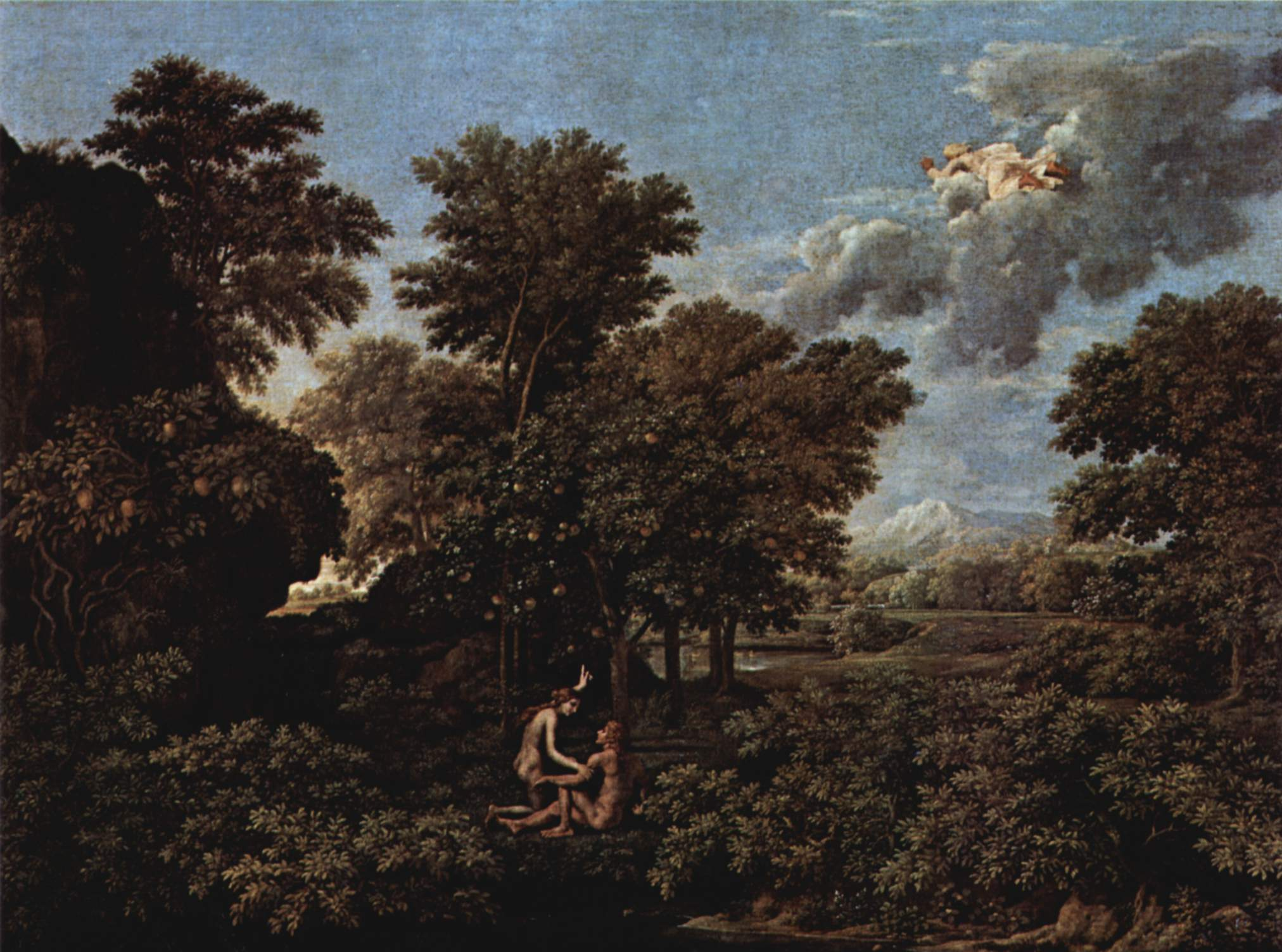
Spring (The Earthly Paradise)

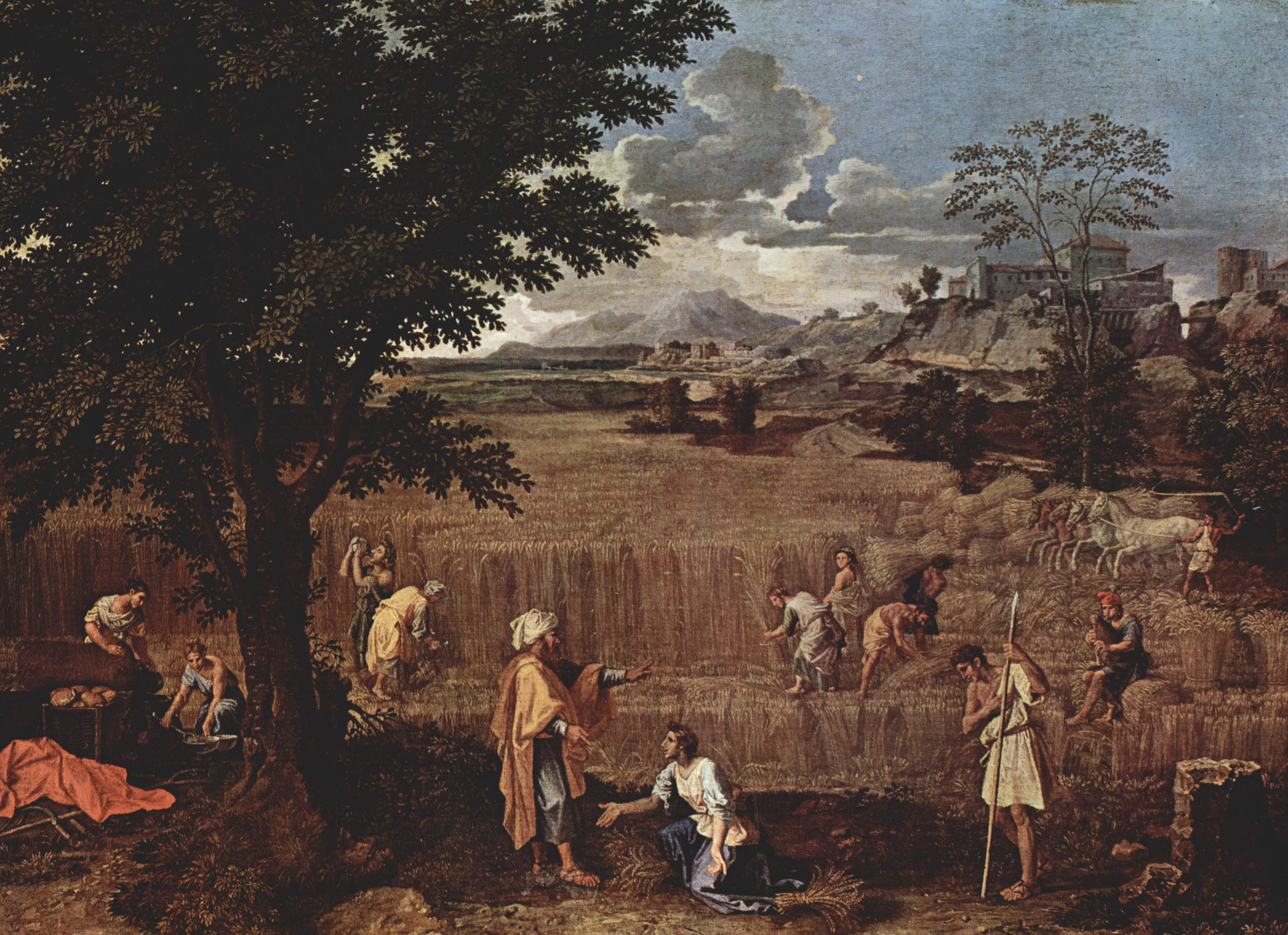
Summer (Ruth and Boaz)

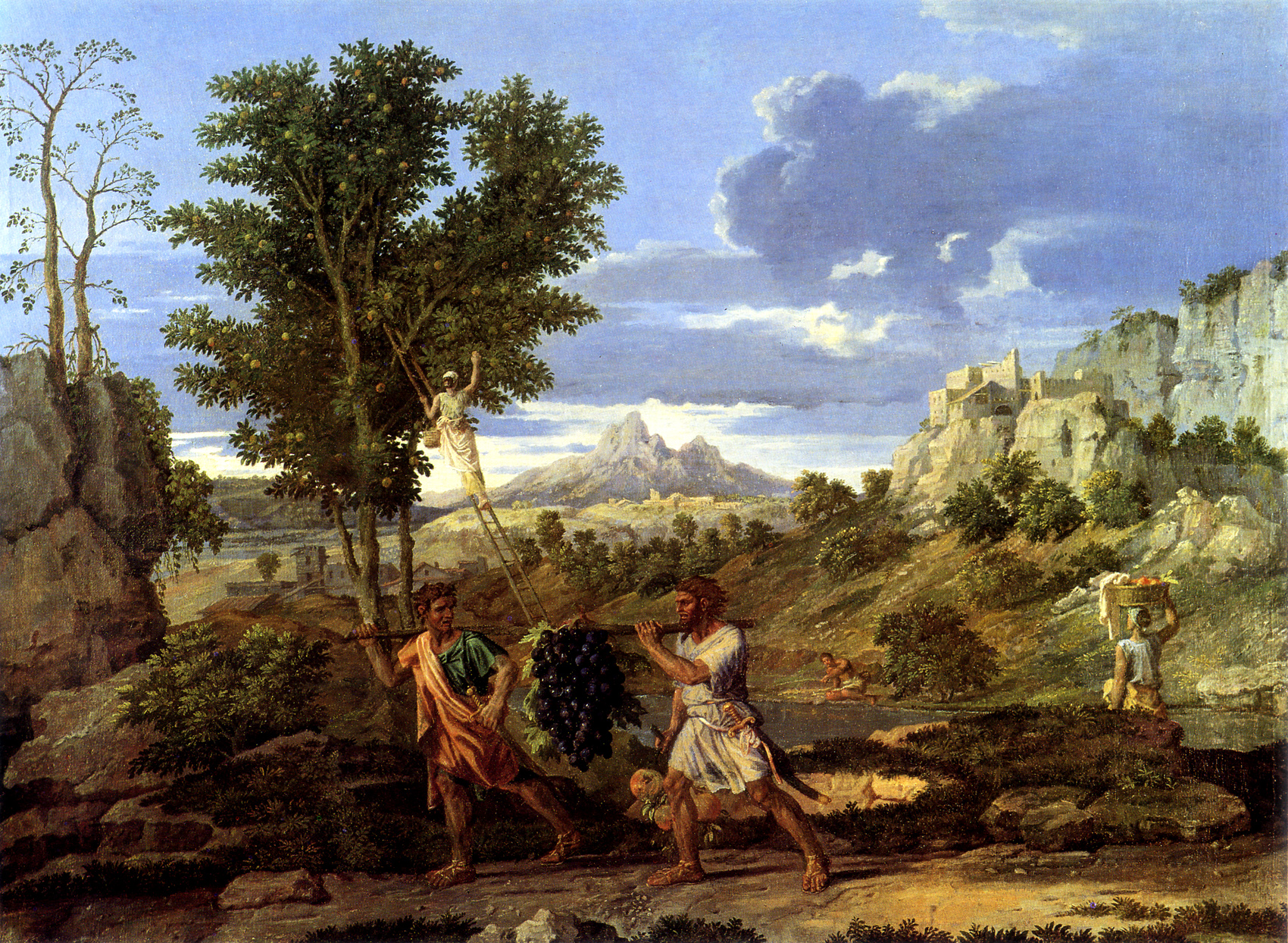
Autumn (The Spies with the Grapes of the Promised Land)

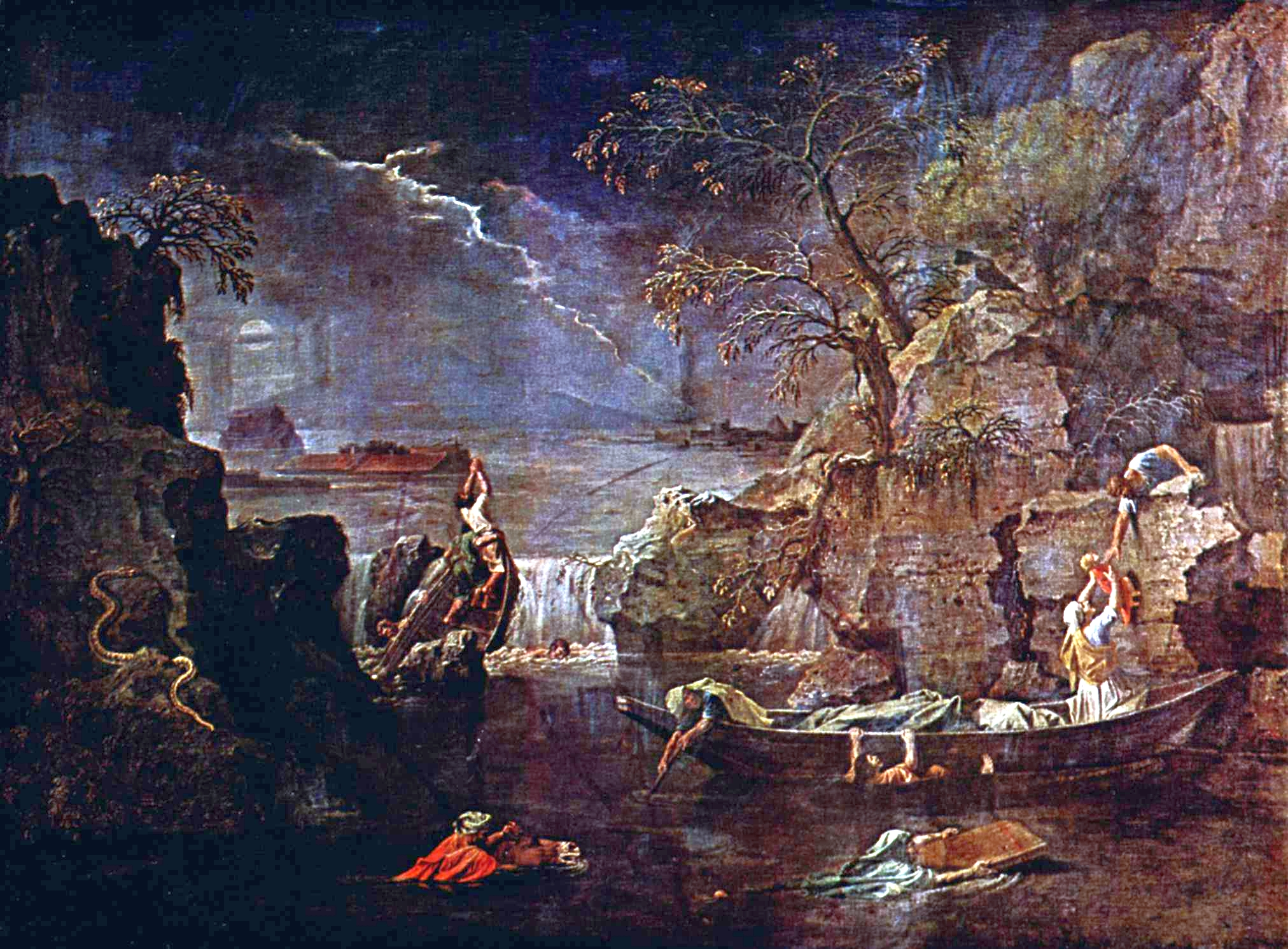
Winter (The Flood)

== The paintings ==
Given their complex iconographic references, the paintings themselves have a deceptive simplicity. However, in their composition, Poussin, painting in his seventies, used all the experience acquired through his life. Understatement is notable throughout the set. No attempt is made to dazzle the viewer with technique and Poussin seems to have taken great pains to leave behind all trace of the artist and let the grandeur of Nature speak for itself.

=== Spring ===
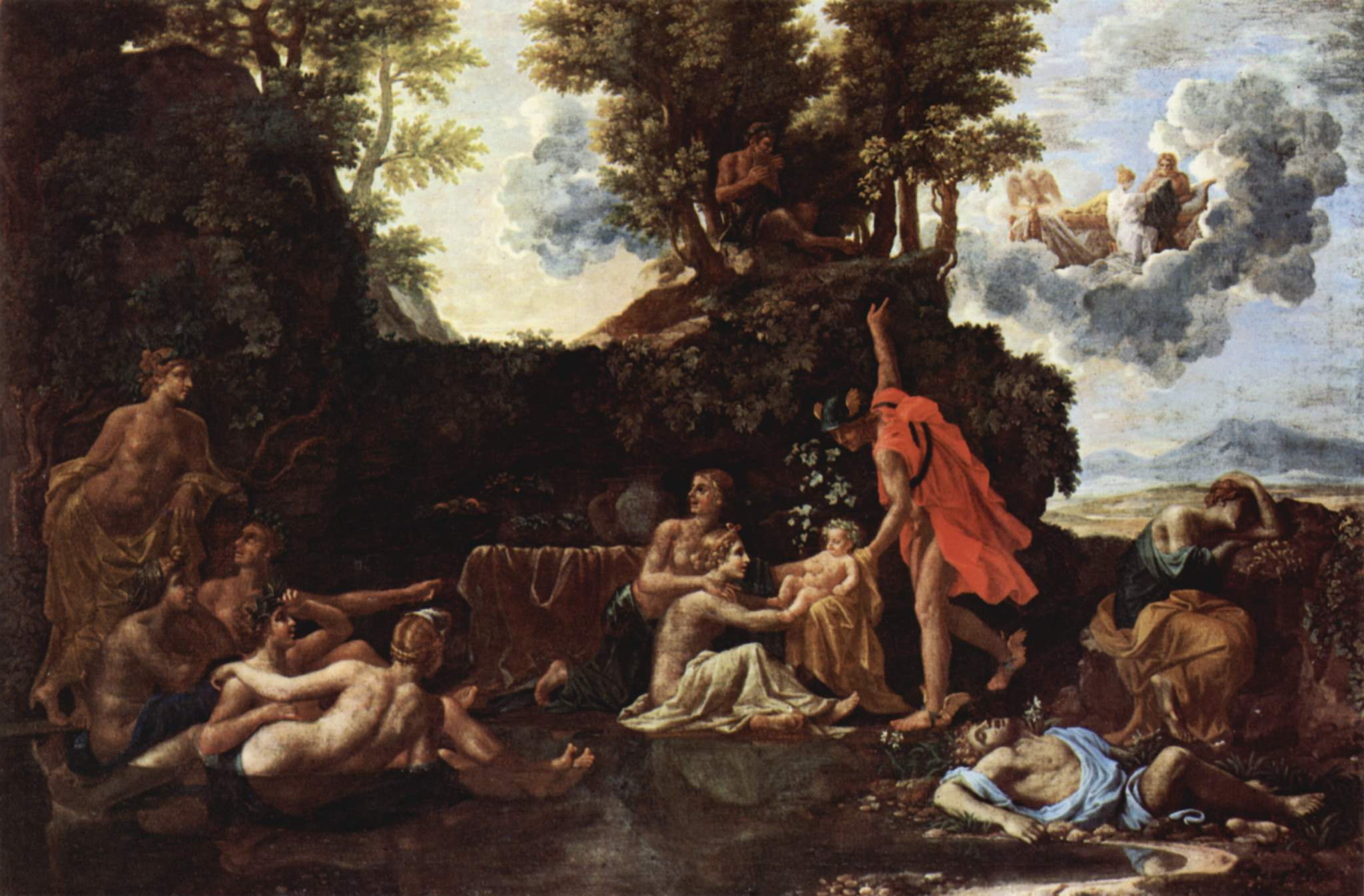
The Birth of Bacchus, 1657, Fogg Art Museum

In Spring or The Earthly Paradise, Poussin depicts Adam and Eve in the Garden of Eden next to the Tree of Knowledge. It is before the original sin and subsequent expulsion from Eden: no snake is visible as Eve points out the forbidden fruit to Adam. The picture shows a luxuriantly vegetated wood with varying gradations of greenery. Ominously the foreground is dimly lit. In the distance the morning sun reveals swans on a lake with meadows and mountains behind; early morning light can also be seen glimmering through a gap in the rocks and shrubs in the middle ground, echoing the iconography of The Birth of Bacchus.

Adam and Eve form a small static couple in the center of the calm woodland, dwarfed by the lush vegetation. Equally small, the robed figure of the Creator can be seen high up on a cloud surrounded by a halo of light; He has pointed away from the viewer, departing as if aware of what is to come. The figures in the composition recall classic depictions in mediaeval miniatures.

As Clark (1961) comments, the work is a perfect visual counterpart to John Milton's Paradise Lost, written in the same period.

=== Summer ===
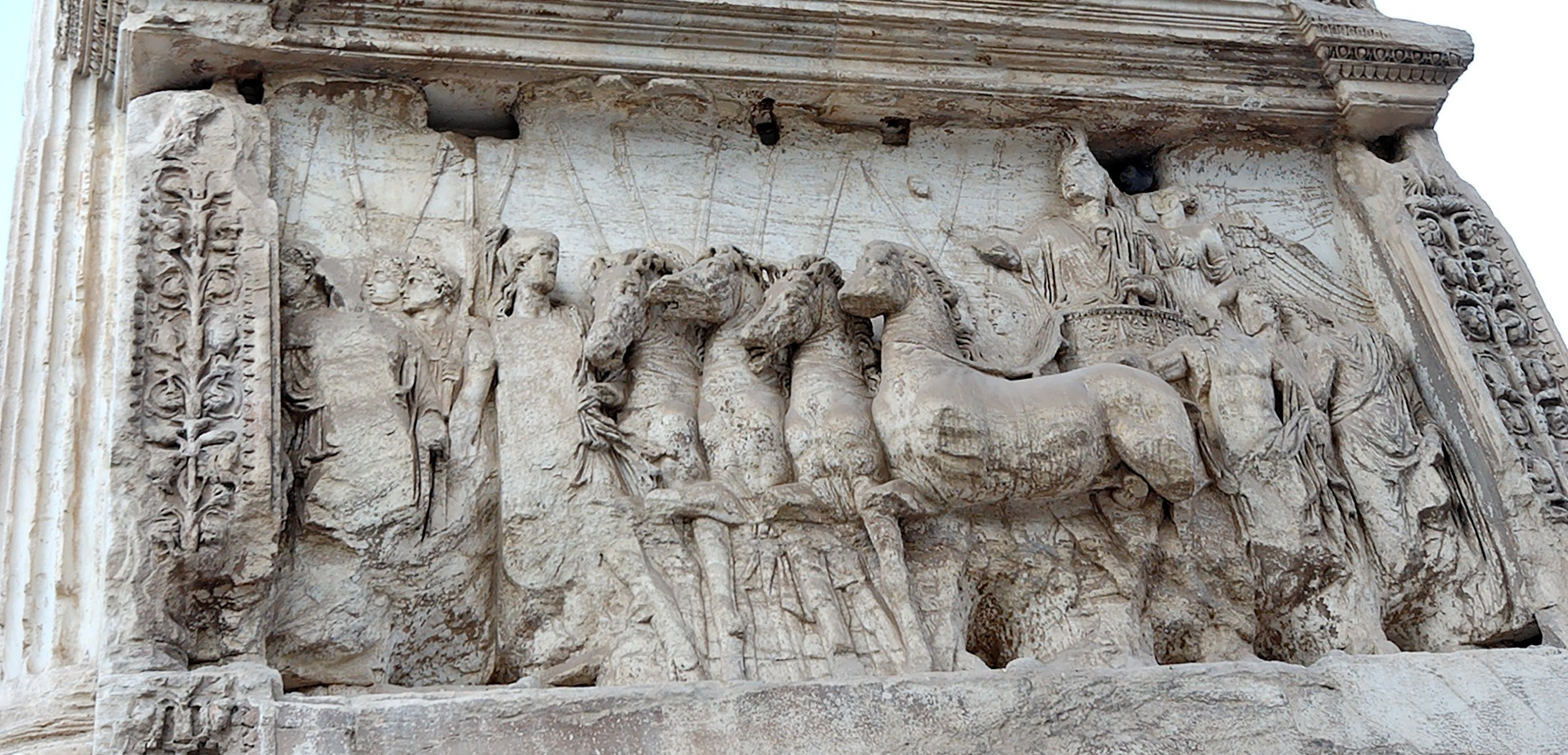
Detail from the Arch of Titus, Rome

In Summer or Ruth and Boaz, the scene is built up in rectangular blocks behind the three principal figures in the foreground, who are seen in profile as in a bas-relief. Ruth the Moabite kneels before Boaz, as his servant looks on benignly. Two parallel walls of corn are visible, along with the detailed decorative painting of the individual stems. The cornfield itself forms the center of the painting. Its jagged edge leads the eye to the rocks, sea and mountains in the distance. In the middle ground, a group of reapers form an extended frieze, while further back a group of five horses can be seen, executed in the classical style of the triumphal arches of Ancient Rome. The bucolic scene is completed by figures of a peasant playing on bagpipes to the right and, on the left, a reaper quenching his thirst from a flask of wine while women prepare bread in the shade of the large tree in the foreground.

As Clark (1961) has commented, in Poussin's elegiac treatment of Summer "the mood of the Georgics is raised to a kind of sacramental gravity."

=== Autumn ===
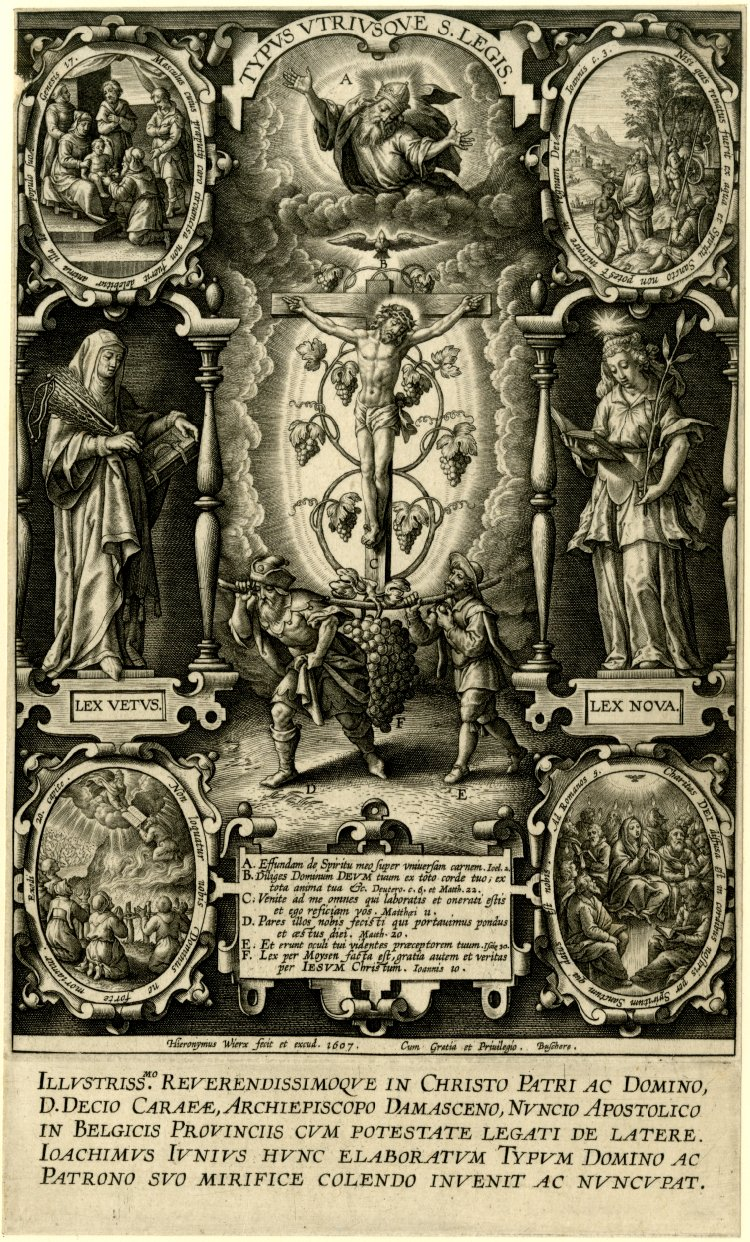
Hier. Wierix: Engraving 1607, British Museum

The rougher texture and trembling brushwork evident in Autumn or The Spies with the Grapes of the Promised Land suggest that this might have been the last painting of the set to be completed. The lush vegetation of Spring is replaced by stony ground with small clumps of grass. Only the apple tree in the center bears fruit; the leaves are already beginning to fall from the two small trees on the left. Long shadows are cast by the evening sun, whose fading light catches a town nestling under a mountain in the distance and buildings perched on a rocky ledge to the right. The observer's eye is gently directed towards the central figures of the two Israelite spies by the lines of clouds and cliffs beneath them. As related in the Book of Numbers, they need a pole to carry the enormous grapes; one of the spies holds a branch of oranges as large as melons. In the middle ground are a fisherman and a woman with a basket of fruit on her head.

In the central bas-relief composition, Poussin has used elements from an allegorical engraving from 1607 by Hieronymus Wierix for the classical figures of the two men with grapes. In Poussin's painting, a woman can be seen gathering fruit on a ladder leaning against the tree, with the ladder appearing to rise out of the grapes. In the original the body of Christ rises from the grapes. This has suggested an iconographic interpretation of the apple tree as the Tree of Life – the heavenly rewards promised in paradise after salvation.

=== Winter ===
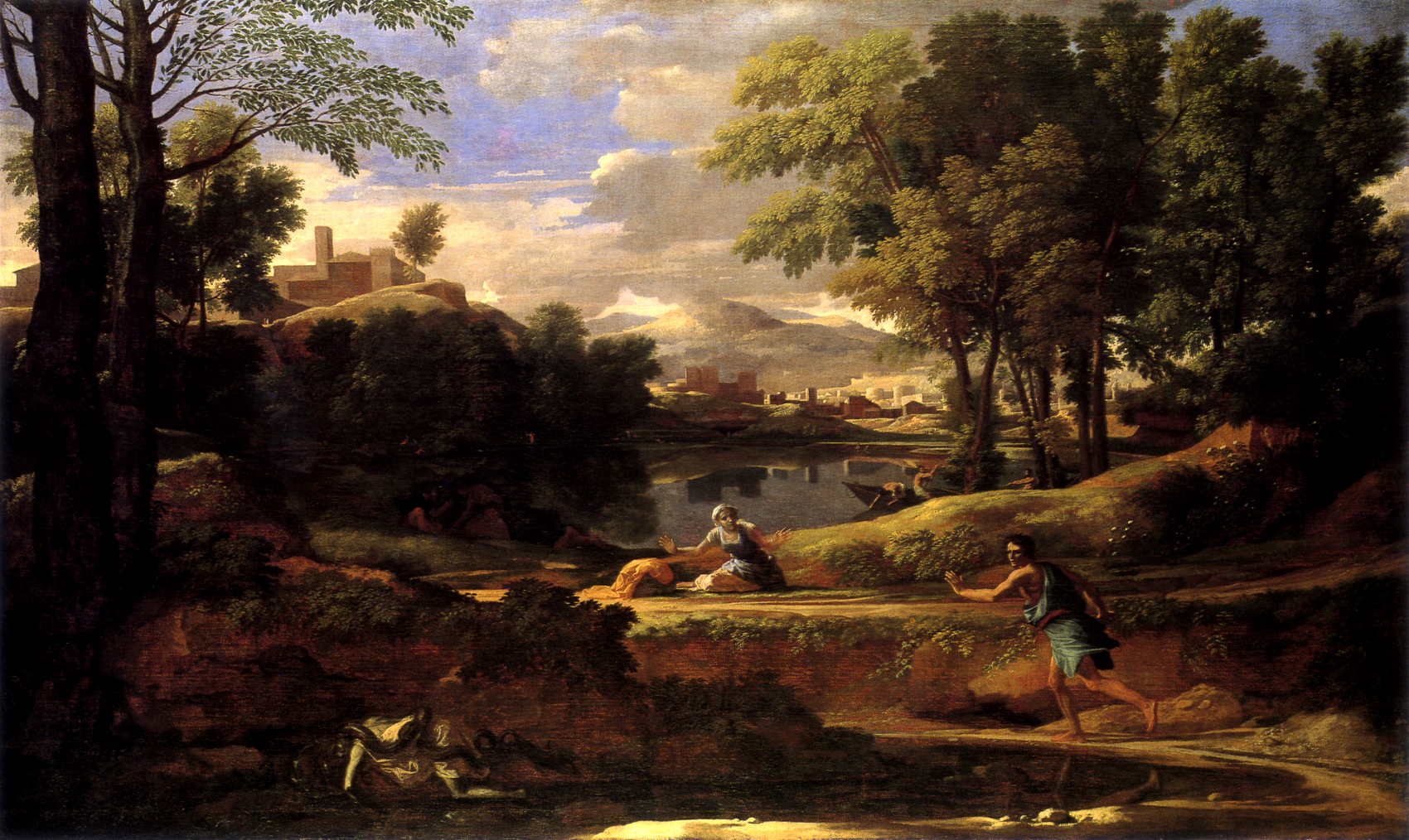
Nicolas Poussin: Landscape with a man killed by a snake 1648, National Gallery

Winter or The Flood is most commonly referred to by its French title Le Deluge. In this highly original painting Poussin depicts the final stages of the horrific cataclysm of The Flood with restraint. The picture records the moment when the floods are finally covering the plain with the last few rocky outcrops disappearing under the rising waters. The horizontal lines used in his other paintings to create a sense of order here lead the eye through the painting with increasing unease. The moonlit scene is colored in different shades of bluey grey, interrupted by flashes of lightning. The dim outlines of Noah's Ark can be made out floating on the calmer waters in the far distance. Contrasting with the jagged shapes of rocks and trees, the waterfall produces a horizontal backdrop for the frieze of stranded survivors in the foreground, uncertain of their impending doom. Poussin ominously places a snake slithering across the rock on the left of the picture, a symbol often employed in his pictures to conjure up a sense of horror. Additionally, the presence of a snake plays a special iconographic role in the cycle, because it also serves as a reminder of the singular absence of a serpent in the Garden of Eden.

== Reception and influence ==
He applies nature to his own purposes, works out her images according to standards of his own thought ... and the first conception being given, all the rest seems to grow out of, and be assimilated to it, by the unfailing process of a studious imagination.

— William Hazlitt

Nicolas Poussin is regarded by many historians of art as one of the most influential figures in French landscape painting. In his paintings he looked for a harmony between vertical and horizontal elements, sometimes resorting to mathematical devices such as the golden ratio. In landscape painting, in which the elements are mostly horizontal, he introduced classical architecture to make the Pythagorean right angles so essential to his methods, much studied later by commentators and artists alike. When Poussin's Seasons were first exhibited, they were immediately discussed by French academicians, connoisseurs and artists, including Charles le Brun, Sébastien Bourdon, Loménie de Brienne and Michel Passart, a patron of both Claude and Poussin. As Brienne reported at the time:

"We met at the Duke of Richelieu's where most of the inquiring minds in Paris could be found. There was a long and erudite discussion. I also spoke and declared myself for the Deluge. Passat felt the same way. LeBrun, who hardly rated either Spring or Autumn, gave a long eulogy on Summer. But Bourdon held out for the Earthly Paradise and on this he would not budge."

Damn it! A Provençal Poussin, that would fit me like a glove. Twenty times I have wanted to paint the theme of Ruth et Booz ... I would like, [...] as in Automne, to give a fruit picker the slenderness of an Olympian plant and the celestial ease of a Virgilian verse.

— Paul Cézanne

Unlike other artists who spawned slavish imitators, Poussin's influence seems to have been wholly positive. Other artists understood his balance between ideal and reality. His influence can be seen in the work of French landscape painters such as Bourdon, Gaspard Dughet, Millet, Corot, Pissarro and Cézanne. Although the critic William Hazlitt recognized Poussin as a great painter, the English school largely preferred the gently poetic landscapes of Claude to the intellectual rigor of Poussin. Turner, although influenced by The Deluge, had strong reservations; Constable was one of the few to learn from Poussin, whose paintings he liked to copy.

=== The Deluge ===
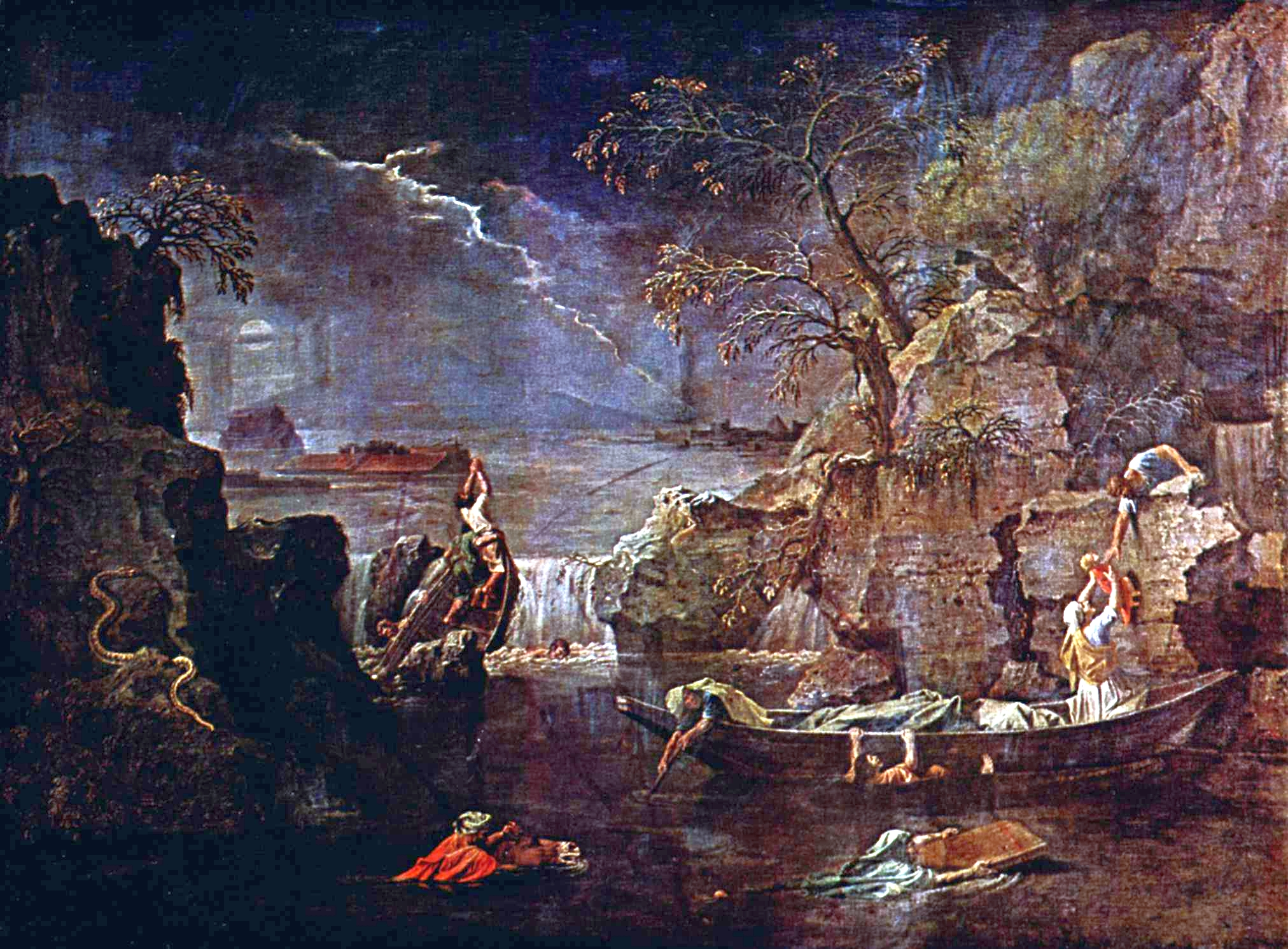
Winter or The Deluge

The single painting from the Seasons which has been most discussed over the years is probably Winter or The Deluge. Although Poussin is primarily regarded as one of the greatest classicist painters, his Deluge created for him a unique position in the history of romantic painting. The Deluge was the prototype and inspiration for a large number of nineteenth-century deluges and tempests. It became known as one of the first masterpieces of the "horrific sublime" and acquired unique importance in the Louvre for romantic landscape painters. Almost all French critics and historians of art commented on it, many hailing it as the greatest painting of all time. In England Hazlitt described it as "perhaps the finest historical landscape in the world" and Constable considered it "alone in the world".

Very soon after it was first exhibited, the Académie Royale exceptionally devoted a short conférence to it in 1668, with an unprecedented five subsequent discussions between 1694 and 1736, indicating the unique impression it had made in France. These early appraisals recognized the daring originality of the picture, giving it a special place of honor amongst Poussin's oeuvre. While recognizing the harmony of the picture and its economical monochromatism, the academicians nevertheless felt that the inherent greyness of the subject matter did not give scope for Objets agréables.

In 1750 the Deluge was included in an exhibition of the paintings of Louis XV in the Luxembourg Palace. At the time its popularity with the public eclipsed the Marie de' Medici cycle of Rubens, on display for the first time; this included well-known visitors such as Charles-Antoine Coypel, James Barry, and Horace Walpole, who in particular singled out the Deluge as "worth going to see alone" and "the first picture of its kind in the world". It was, however, the commentary of the Abbé Louis Gougenot at the time that captured the four aspects of the painting that would be the main points of all future discussion:

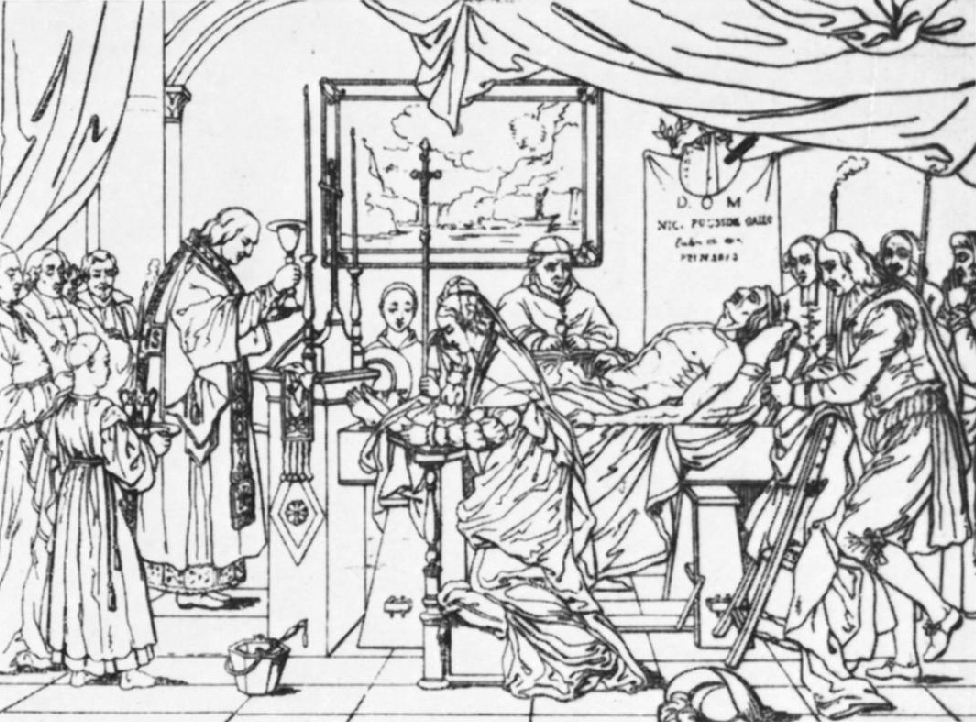
Funeral service of Nicolas Poussin by Pierre-Nolasque Bergeret. 1819. Engraving by C. Normand. The Deluge hangs on the back wall.

- Economy of means. One significant feature that distinguished the Deluge from the Deluges of Raphael and Michelangelo was the small number of figures in the painting – eleven including a horse. Several writers including Coypel and Diderot thought there were even fewer. Poussin was perceived to have deliberately chosen to depict "le moment solennel où la race humaine va disparaître". Early critics, including Chateaubriand, regarded this essay in horror and pathos as Poussin's swansong. Later the historical painter Pierre-Nolasque Bergeret included it symbolically in his depiction of Poussin's death. Critics also noted Poussin's understatement: according to Diderot and de Clarac, the calmness of the picture only intensified the horror. Constable, who picked out the Deluge as one of the four paintings marking "the memorable points in the history of landscape", considered that this calmness showed Poussin's faithfulness to the original biblical text, which only mentions rain; for him Poussin had eschewed all violent and dramatic effects, thereby deepening the interest in those few figures present.
- Richness of interest. Although lacking in principal figures, the Deluge was considered to evoke in the observer all the ideas connected with a disaster – destruction, desolation, fear, horror and melancholy. Critics singled out the old man clinging to a plank, the pathos of the family group desperately trying to rescue their child and, most sinister of all, the serpent gliding over the rocks on the right. Rousseau was among those whose imagination was haunted by the serpent, the precursor of evil. The nightmarish image of the serpent – l'esprit tentateur qui corrompit le premier homme, et qui s'applaudit encore du nouveau désastre don't il est l'auteur – became one of the most copied motifs of Poussin.
- Sublimity of conception. For many critics, Poussin's boldness in daring to break all the usual rules of painting showed that he was attempting to speak the unspeakable; that he was willing "to hurl himself into the depths to make tangible an inaccessible truth." With this recognition of visionary recklessness, considered by some to contradict his usual rational methods, came also an appreciation of the ineffable sublimity of the Deluge, both for its terror and its simplicity. Like others before him, Shelley was transfixed by the painting, which he found "terribly impressive". Many commentators have ascribed the visceral and overwhelming reaction created by the Deluge, so hard to translate into words, to Poussin's genius in evoking the sublime.
- Appropriateness of colour. Already in the seventeenth century, academicians had praised the Deluge for its "universal colour". In 1750 the Abbé Gougenot had similarly referred to the appropriateness of grey as a colour. It was Coypel, however, who understood that it was a colour designed to evoke a mood of melancholy. Later this was understood to be a supreme example of Poussin's theory of modes. This ran contrary to the usual academic theories demanding vivid contrasts in a work of art. On the contrary as the English critic John Opie pointed out in 1809, the colourlessness of the Deluge was one of the main factors for the "pathetic solemnity, grandeur and simplicity of its effect". Poussin's use of colour did not please all, notably the English critic John Ruskin, who found the treatment of the theme undramatic and unnaturalistic. Much later at the turn of the twentieth century the French art historian Paul Desjardins, one of the greatest scholars of Poussin, interpreted the Deluge not as an evocation of rain or flooding but of doom and despair. Rather than realism, he saw the whole painting as an expression of a human state, a prayer uttered into the void never to be answered. With this interpretation, the greyness of the picture became moving in itself, the symbol for a lost soul. Moreover, the cycle of four paintings could then be seen to have a unity as four moods or musical modes, reflected in the different colourings of the paintings: lush greens for Spring; golden yellows for Summer; fading browns for Autumn; and ashen grey for Winter.
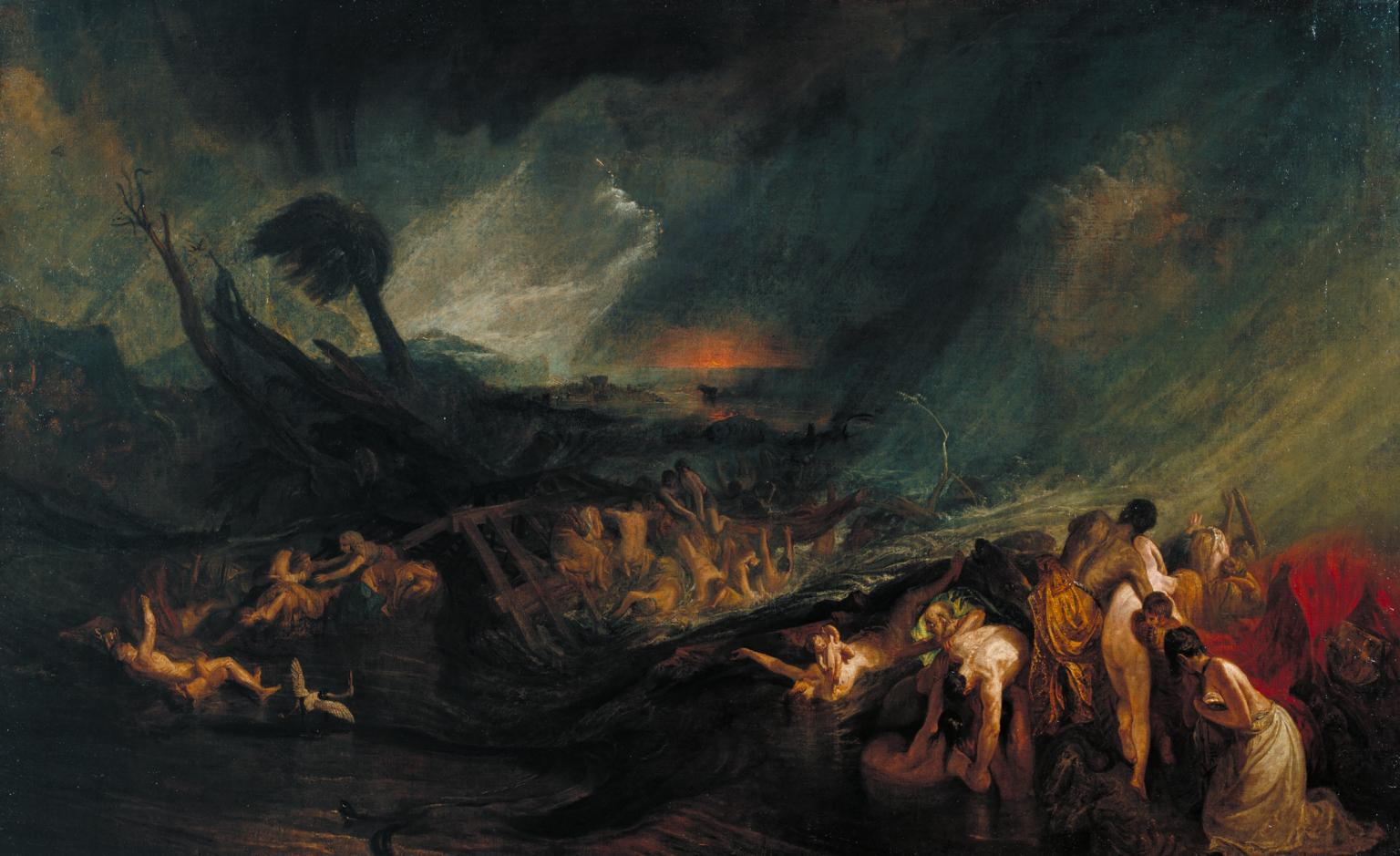
The Deluge by J. M. W. Turner. 1804-1805. Tate Gallery, London

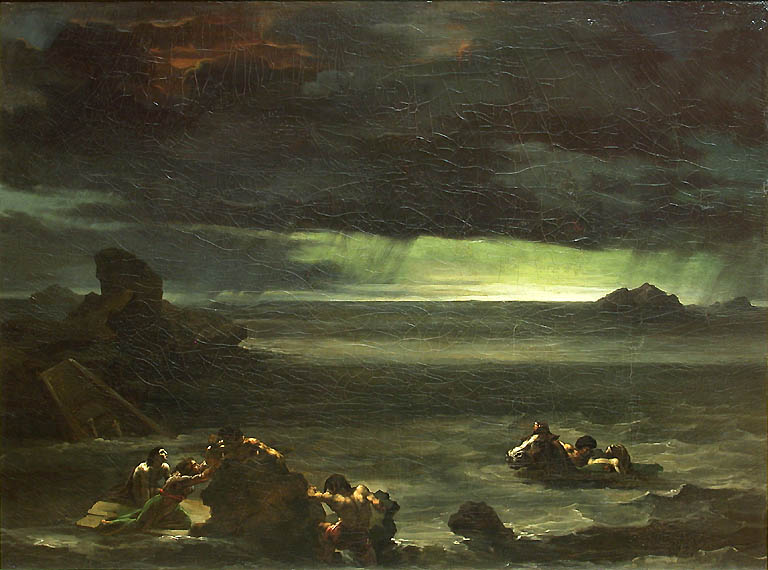
The Deluge by Théodore Géricault. 1818. Louvre, Paris

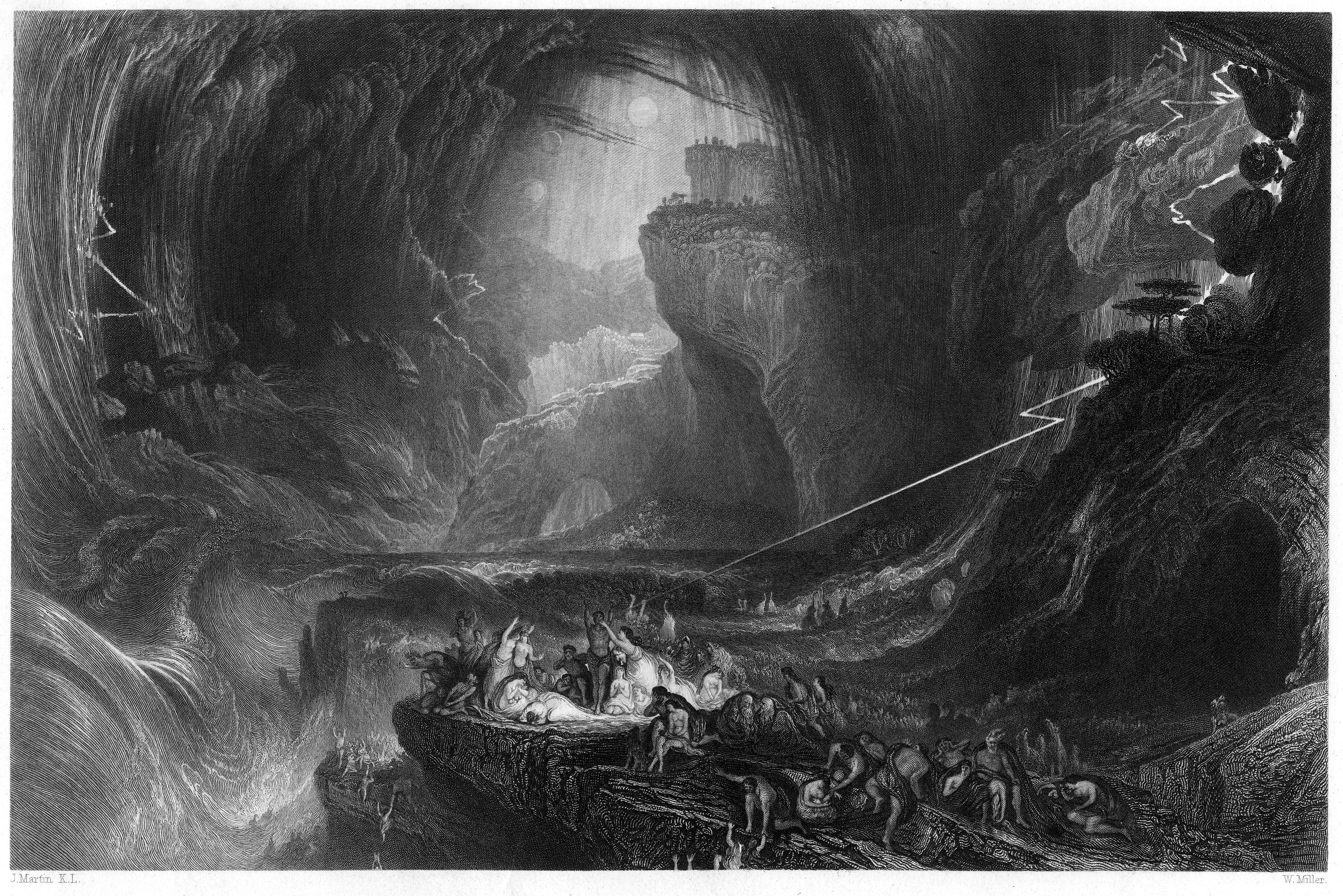
The Deluge by John Martin. 1828. Mezzotint of lost 1826 painting.

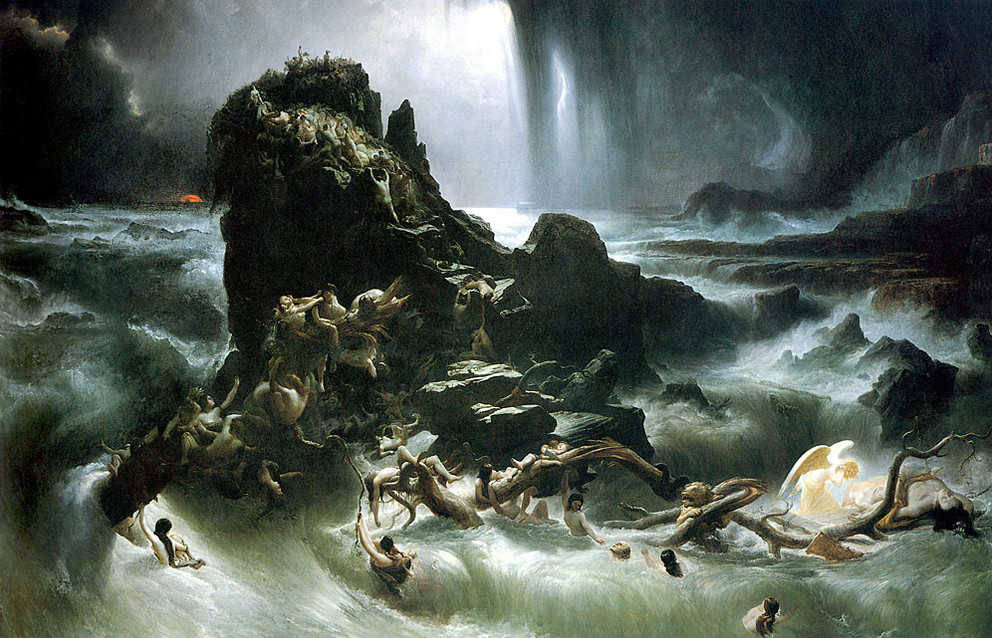
The Deluge by Francis Danby. 1837-1839. Tate Gallery, London

The Deluge inspired many similar paintings by later artists. It was widely distributed as an engraving and numerous artists made copies of the original, including Peyron, Géricault, Etty, Danby and Degas. Apocalyptic paintings became popular in France in the second half of the eighteenth century and the Deluge was a theme for the Prix de Rome in sculpture in 1780. Many of the subsequent monumental Deluges owe some kind of debt to Poussin's understated original. These include works by Géricault, Regnault and Girodet. Across the channel the first major painter to produce an English Deluge was Turner. Seeing the original in 1802 marked a turning point in his career. Fascinated by the picture, particularly its "sublime" colour, he was nevertheless critical of its composition and found it too restrained and undramatic. His own reworking is more dramatic, but, along with other later variations on the same theme, still owes much to Poussin's original. Later English deluges by John Martin and Francis Danby were less influenced by the original in the Louvre and were often a conscious reaction to its understatement and calmness. Later Ruskin dismissed Poussin's Deluge, directing his readers instead to Turner's version, with no mention of Turner's indebtedness to Poussin. Since the beginning of the twentieth century the Deluge has remained popular, still retaining its modernity as a piece of universal, even abstract, art. As Verdi (1981) has wryly commented, it is the only painting by Poussin which "would retain much of its attraction for the lover of modern art even if it were inadvertently hung upside down".

== On screen ==
Admirable tremblement du temps, film by Alain Jaubert from Palettes series (1991).

== See also ==
- List of paintings by Nicolas Poussin
