= Odysseus on the Island of the Phaecians =

Painting by Peter Paul Rubens

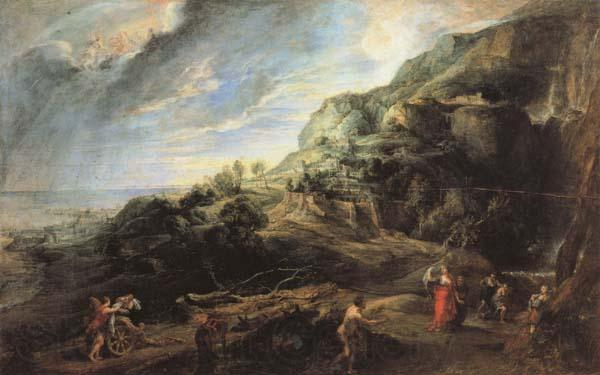
Odysseus on the Island of the Phaecians (1630-1635) by Peter Paul Rubens

Odysseus on the island of the Phaecians is a landscape painting by Peter Paul Rubens, dating to around 1630–1635. It shows Nausicaa and her maids discovering Odysseus on Phaecia. It is now in the Galleria Palatina in Florence.

== History ==
The work was first recorded in 1677 in the duke of Richelieu's collection as a view of the city of Cádiz. It passed from there into the Habsburg collection and arrived in Florence in 1765. It was taken to Paris by the French between March and April 1799 and remained in France until 1815.
