= Pierre-Nolasque Bergeret =

French painter

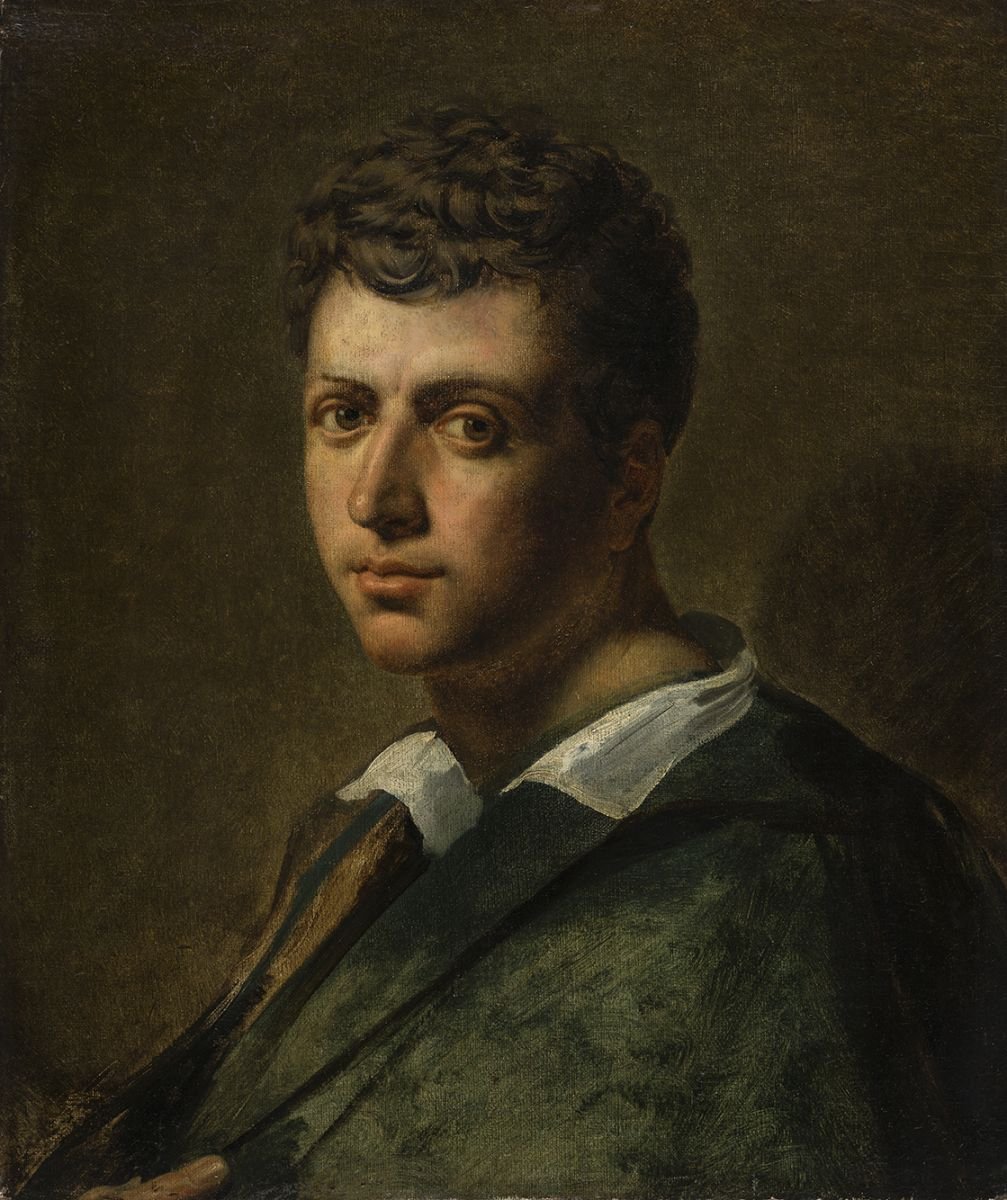
Self-portrait of Pierre-Nolasque Bergeret, circa 1804

Pierre-Nolasque Bergeret (French: [pjɛʁ nɔlask bɛʁʒəʁɛ]; 30 January 1782, Bordeaux – 21 February 1863, Paris) was a French painter, pioneer lithographer and designer of medals and costumes for the stage, who studied with Jacques-Louis David.

He was born in Bordeaux, where he received his early training, then moved to Paris, where he worked in the ateliers of François-André Vincent and then Jacques-Louis David, where he met François Marius Granet and Jean-Auguste-Dominique Ingres.

The high point of his early career was marked by one painting in particular, shown at the Salon of 1806 and considered by Bergeret among his greatest works. Reminiscent of both Poussin and David, the "Homage Rendered to Raphael on His Deathbed"(engraved in 1812 by J.L. Charles Pauquet) was praised by critics for its mood of restrained emotion as well as denigrated by some for the heaviness of its figures. The Emperor Napoleon I purchased "Homage" for his wife, the Empress Josephine, and subsequently it was hung in the gallery of her residence at Malmaison. At some point the painting was removed, stored away, sold, and eventually was purchased for the collection of the Allen Memorial Art Museum, Oberlin, Ohio. A second version of the painting, likely autograph and previously believed to be the original Salon version, exists and is now found at Malmaison.

Bergeret played a major role in introducing lithography, in part through his reproductive prints after paintings by Nicolas Poussin and Raphael: his lithograph Mercury (1804), reproducing a detail from Raphael’s fresco in the Villa Farnesina, and his caricatures of current Paris fashion, e.g. Les Musards de la Rue du Coq, Le Suprême Bon Ton Actuel (by 1805) are among the earliest examples of lithographic technique.

Bergeret was commissioned to design Napoleonic medals, or provide frieze-like panels en camaïeu to be painted on Sèvres porcelains and to provide designs for the bas-reliefs on the Column in the Place Vendôme, built 1806–11 and directly inspired by Trajan's Column in Rome. The Column suffered the vicissitudes of French politics, having been destroyed and restored twice.

Bergeret too, having led a successful career during the first Empire, was increasingly caught up in artistic rivalries and disputes with government officials of the Bourbon Restoration, which eventually led to his decline. His long standing contract to provide costume designs for the Opera Comique in Paris ended in a protracted lawsuit, which he eventually lost. He had the bad luck to cross the Comte de Forbin, Vivant-Denon's successor as director of the Louvre, who did little to further Bergeret's career, even actively working against him. Bergeret's efforts to win public commissions (such as the ceiling of the Bordeaux Opera House) often fell through due to ill fate as well as political machinations and person intrigues against him. Increasingly in debt and without commissions or patrons, in 1848, Bergeret published his "Lettres d'un artiste sur l'etat des arts en France" an attempt to vindicate himself in which he set out his views regarding the artistic bureaucracy in France, exposing the various problems that it presented to talented artists (such as himself). Bergeret, once in the forefront of artistic trends and technology found himself sidelined from royal and imperial patronage and national influence. He painted little of importance during his final years and died embittered and empoverished.

The subjects of his paintings tend towards the vividly anecdotal. He was early among artists drawing subject matter from the culture of the Renaissance, in the style Troubadour: Honors Rendered to Raphael on His Deathbed 1806 (Allen Art Museum, Oberlin College, Ohio). Charles V Picking up Titian's Brush 1808; Anne Boleyn Condemned to Death ca. 1814 (Musée du Louvre); Aretino in the Studio of Titian ca 1822; Fra Lippo Lippi Enslaved in Tangiers, Painting a Portrait of His Captor ca 1819; Another major history painting by Bergeret is Marius Meditating on the Ruins of Carthage. Other typical subjects are propagandistic allegories and representations of current events of the French Empire.

== Gallery ==
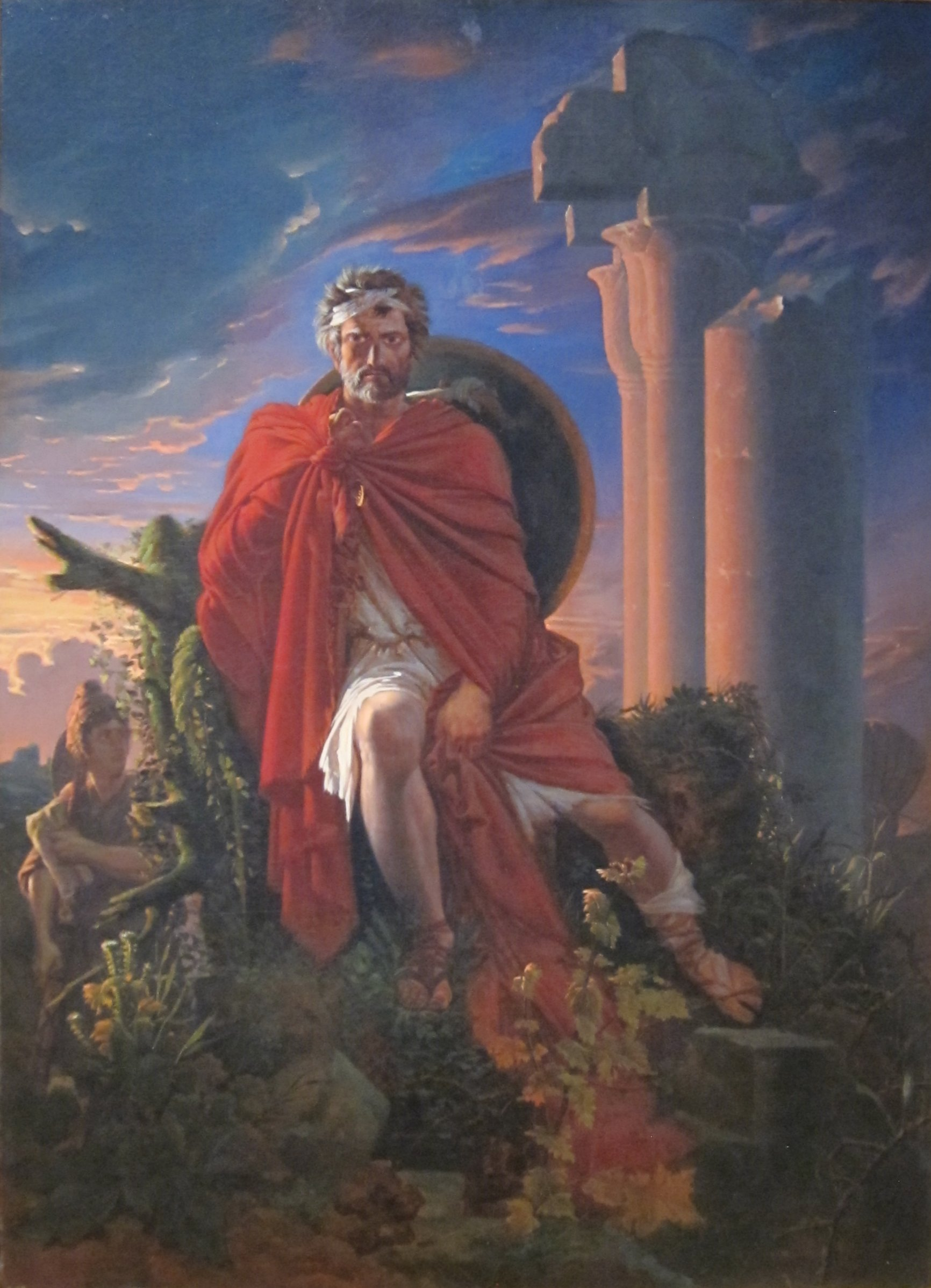
Marius Meditating on the Ruins of Carthage, 1807 Dayton Art Institute

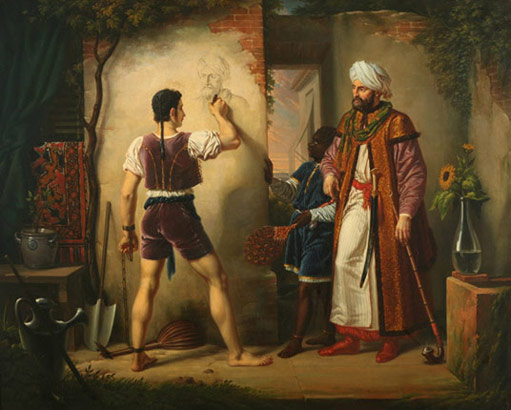
Filippo Lippi slave in Algiers, 1819
