= Peter van Halen =

Flemish painter

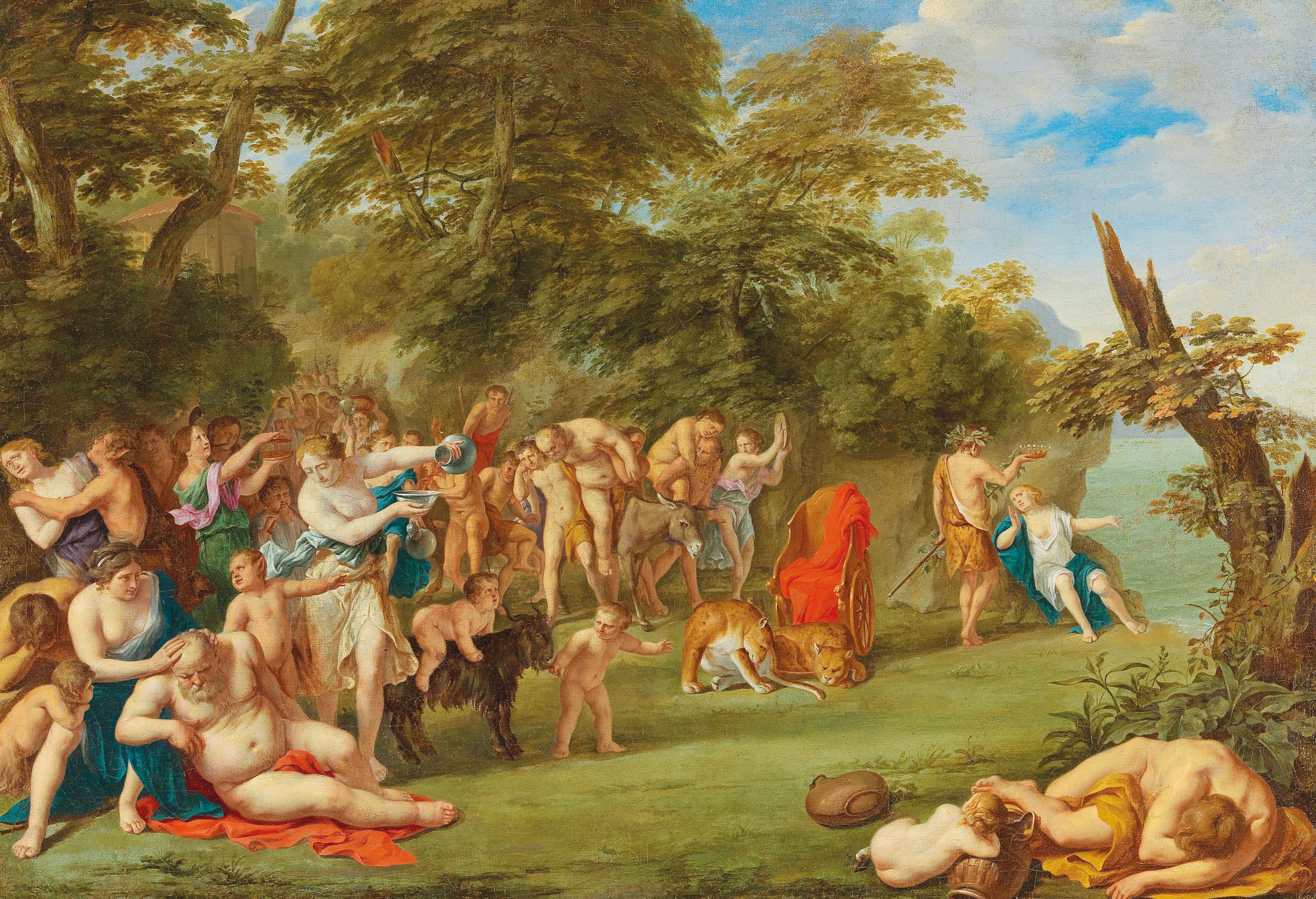
Bacchus and Ariadne on Lemnos

Peter van Halen or Pieter van Haelen (1612–1687) was a Flemish painter. He was known for his italianate landscapes with historical, allegorical and mythological scenes with many figures. His works were stylistically influenced by French Classicism.

== Life ==
Van Halen was born in Antwerp on 9 April 1612 as the son of Peter van Halen (died 23 December 1637) and Catharina Thuys (died 20 January 1642). His father was registered in the Antwerp Guild of Saint Luke as a dealer. Peter the younger was admitted as a master in the Guild in the Guild year 1640–1641 in the capacity of a 'wijnmeester'. i.e. the son of a master.

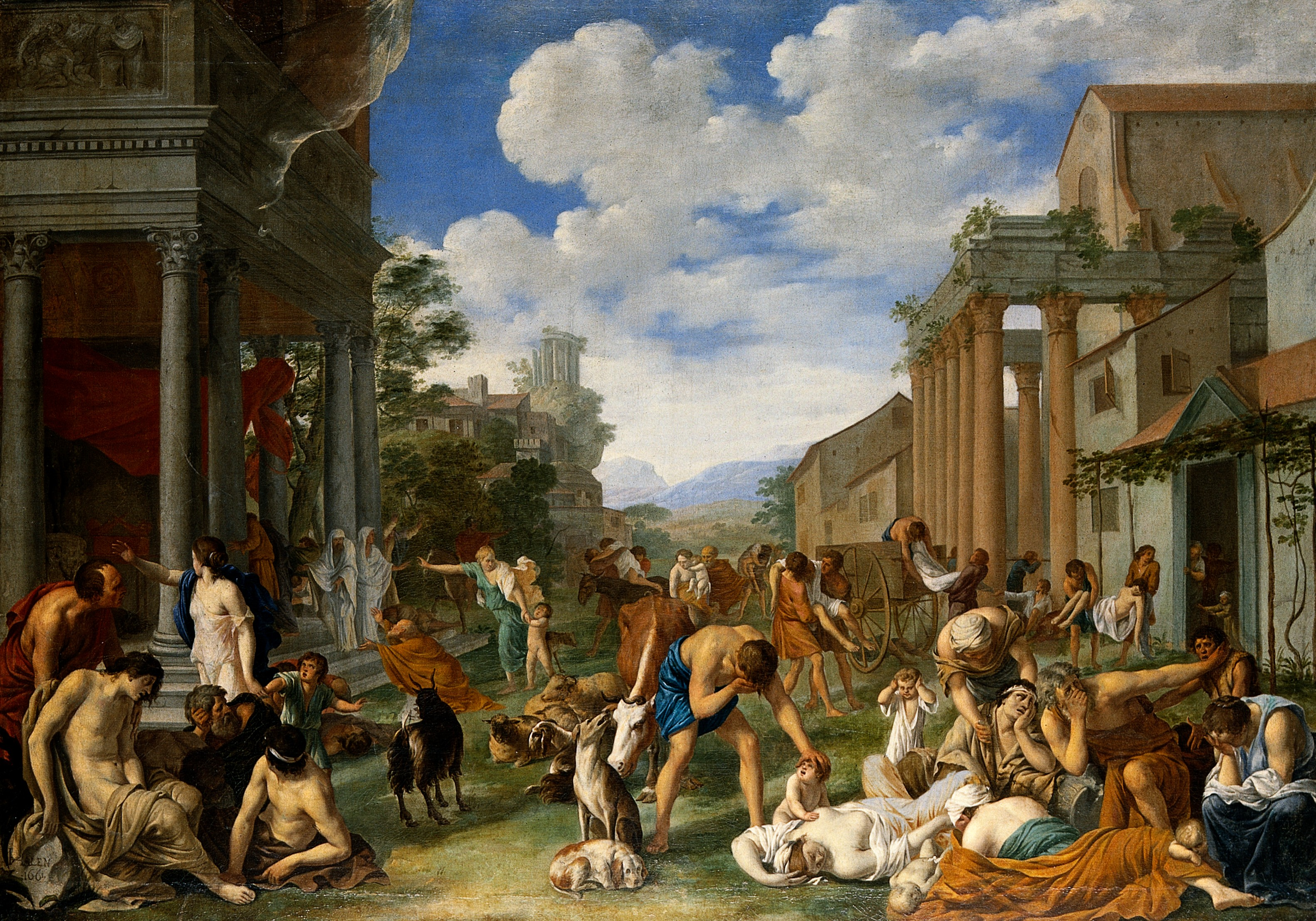
The plague of the Philistines at Ashdod

He married Maria Bock or Bocx (died 1680) on 9 April 1644 in Baesrode (near Dendermonde), "without losing his civic rights", i.e. he was granted dispensation from the rule that deemed citizens from Antwerp to have renounced their citizenship when contracting marriage outside of the city. He was elected dean of the Guild of St. Luke in 1650.

He must have enjoyed patronage at the highest levels as an Ecce Homo by his hand was inventoried in 1659 as the property of the Archduke Leopold Wilhelm of Austria, the governor of the Spanish Netherlands. The Antwerp art dealers Forchondt sold a Sleeping Diana by van Halen to Prince Karl of Liechtenstein in 1670 and sold numerous of his works to patrons in Vienna in 1673, 1674 and 1676.

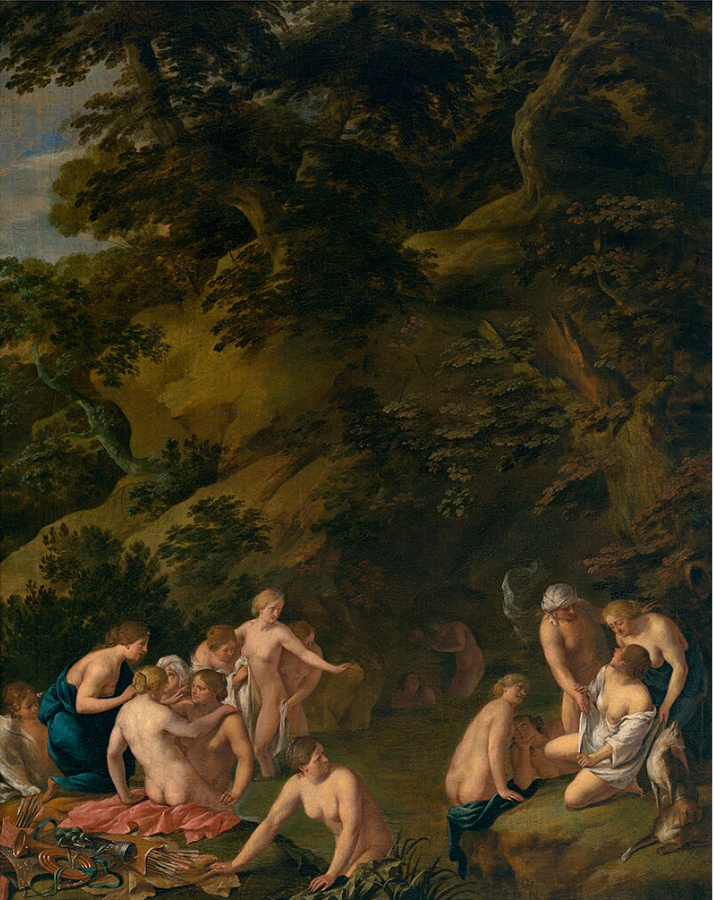
The bath of Diana and Callisto

He was buried on 22 May 1687 in the Church of Our Lady of the Minorites in Antwerp.

== Work ==
He is known for historical, allegorical and mythological scenes with many figures in extensive italianate landscapes. His works were stylistically influenced by French Classicism.

His works frequently cited the compositions of famous contemporaries for inspiration. In The triumph of Galatea, for instance, he relied on a copper engraving by Philippe Thomassin after a drawing by Jacopo Zucchi. He also painted the Plague of the Philistines at Ashdod (signed and dated 1661, Wellcome Library), which was inspired by Poussin's treatment of the same subject, which he may have known through an etching. He relied in this painting on the figures and architecture depicted in the work of Poussin as well as on figures from Rubens. He shows an interest in some of the details, such as the death-cart and the large group of women and children, but does not pay attention to the faces of the figures whose expressions are more schematic.

He occasionally painted figures in landscapes painted by the landscape painter Jacques d'Arthois from Brussels.
