= Saint-Laurent, Paris =

Church of Saint-Laurent
- Église Saint-Laurent
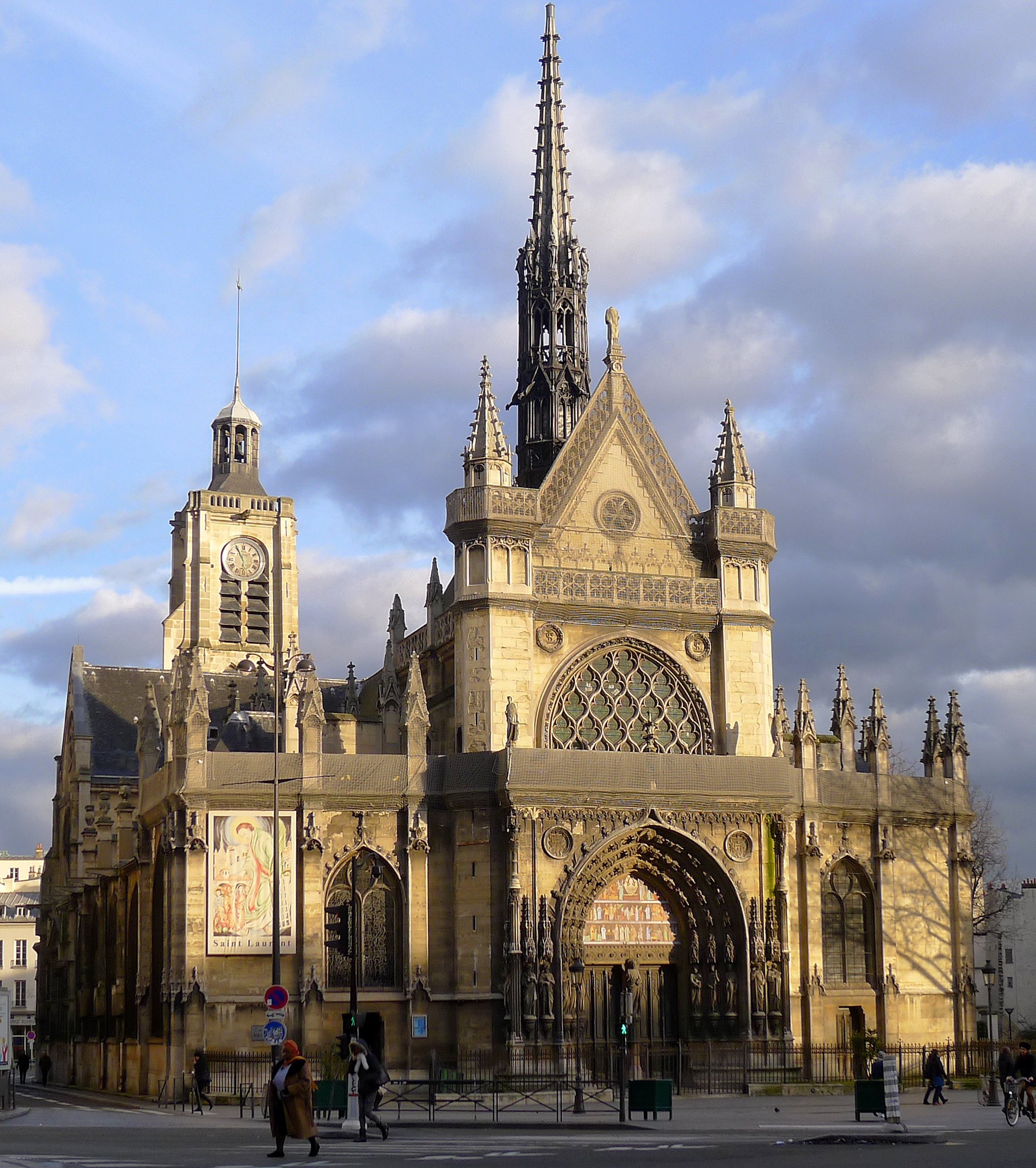
- West facade of the church

- Location within Paris
- 48.874849°N 2.358311°E
- Country: France
- Denomination: Catholic

History
- Status: Parish church
- Founded: 6th century
- Dedication: Saint Lawrence

Architecture
- Functional status: Active
- Heritage designation: Monument historique
- Designated: 2016

Administration
- Archdiocese: Archdiocese of Paris

Saint-Laurent (French pronunciation: [sɛ̃ lɔʁɑ̃]) is a Catholic church in the 10th arrondissement of Paris at 68 bis Boulevard de Magenta. A series of churches occupied the site since the 10th century. It is named for Saint Lawrence, an early Christian martyr who was executed in Rome by the Roman Emperor Valerian in 258 AD. It has been listed since 2016 as a monument historique by the French Ministry of Culture.

The earliest parts of the church date to the 10th century and 15th century, while the facade was rebuilt in the 19th century during the Second French Empire, to fit into the intersection of three new boulevards built by Napoleon III and his deputy Baron Haussmann.

The architecture features a very ornate Flamboyant facade, constructed in the 19th century. The art and decoration includes an exceptional collection of 19th and 20th century stained glass windows. and an important collection of 19th-century religious paintings and sculpture.

== History ==
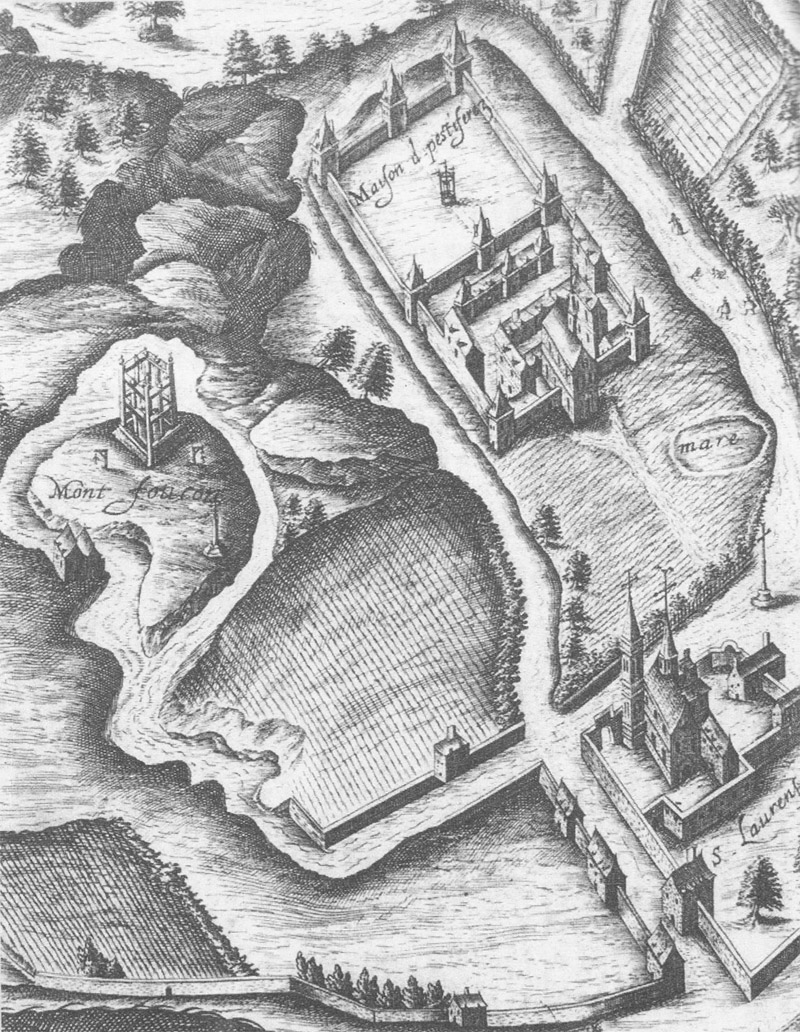
Plan of Paris in 1609 showing the Church (bottom right)

The church was built on the site of an ancient Roman road which passed through Paris. An earlier building on the site is mentioned in several ancient sources, but no trace of it has been found.

The current church was dedicated in 1429, and was rebuilt and enlarged several times. One portion of the bell tower is believed to have been built before that date. The choir appears to have built in the 15th century, the nave in the 17th century, The outer aisles of the choir and the oval chapel of the Virgin were built in the beginning of the 18th century. The classical early facade, similar to that of the Jesuit style, was completed in 1621, but was demolished in the 19th century and replaced with a Flamboyant Gothic facade.

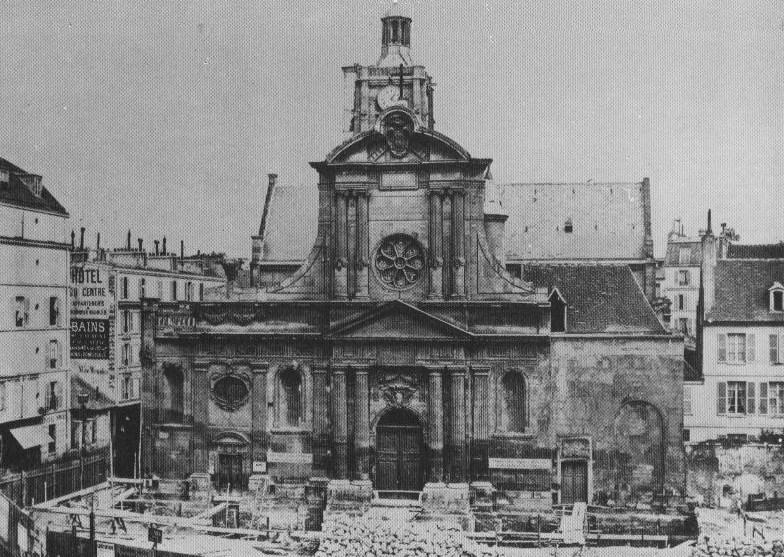
Church before its 1865 reconstruction

During the French Revolution, the church was closed and in 1795 turned into a Temple of Reason. In 1797, the Catholic Church was allowed to return, but had to share the building with a temple dedicated to a movement called Theophilanthropy, and still later with a Temple of the Elderly. In 1802, under an agreement between Napoleon Bonaparte and the Pope, the exclusive use of the building was finally returned to the Catholic Church.

Between 1862 and 1865, the church underwent another major reconstruction to accommodate the new Paris boulevards built by Napoleon III. The architect Constant-Defeux demolished the old facade and built a new one aligned with the street, which combined the Flamboyant with the earlier Gothique Classique or High Gothic.

== Exterior ==
The French classical facade, built in 1621, was rebuilt in the 1865 to align the church with the new boulevards built around it by Napoleon III. The facade is the most lavishly decorated element of the exterior. It was created in 1865 in the style of Neo-gothic-Flamboyant by the architect Simon-Claude Constant-Dufeux. At the top is a sculpture of Christ giving a blessing; it was made by sculptor Aimé-Napoléon Perrey (1813–1883). The Flamboyant spire and the large rose window were added at the same time.

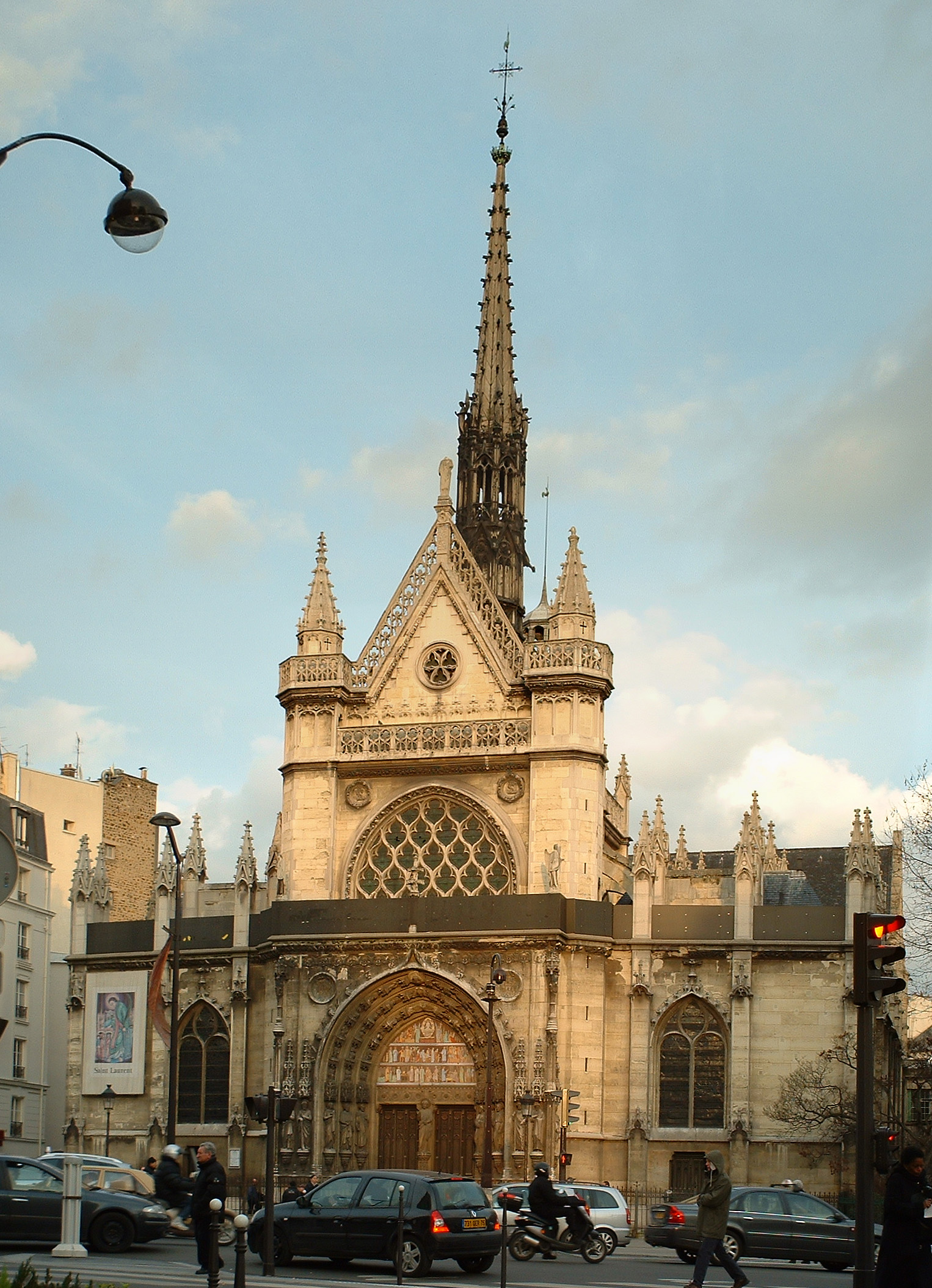
West front, with Flamboyant spire and rose window (19th c.)

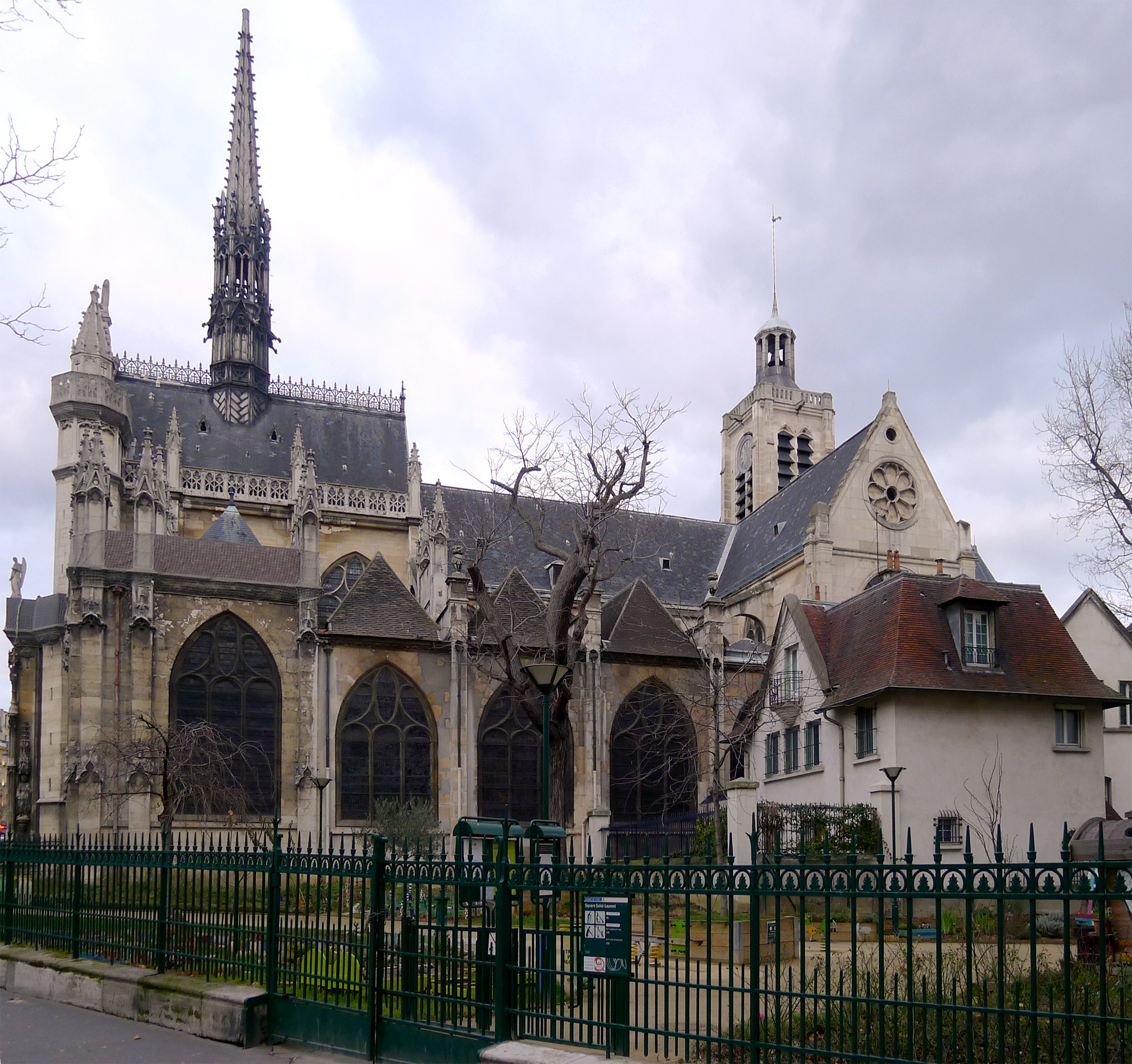
South facade on Square Laurent

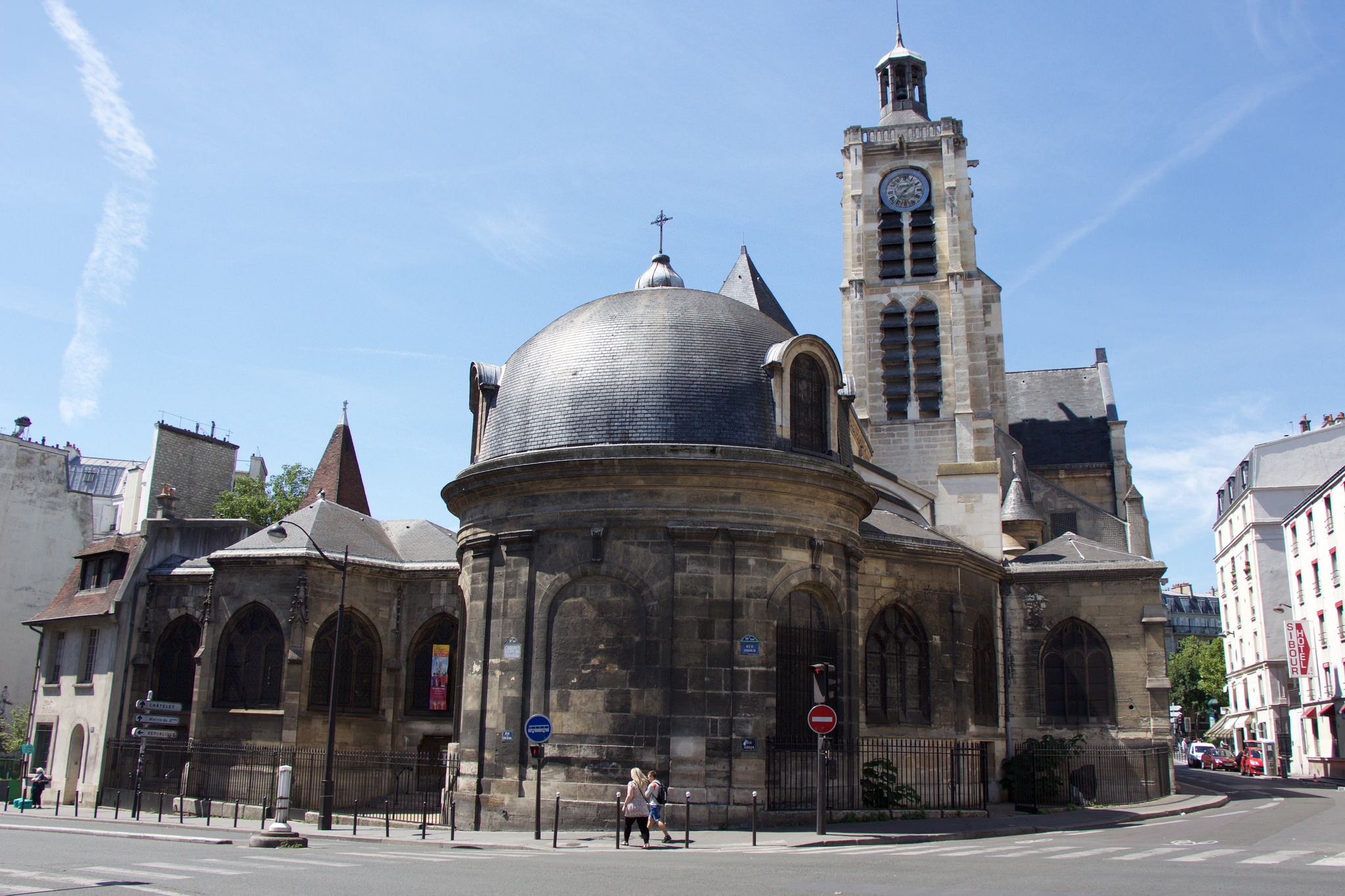
The chevet and the bell tower

=== Portal ===
The pediment over the portal features a painting by Jean-Paul Baize depicting “the Passion of Saint Lawrence”. The work is made with enamel paints baked onto lava, stone, a technique which resists great changes of temperature.It was finished in 1870.

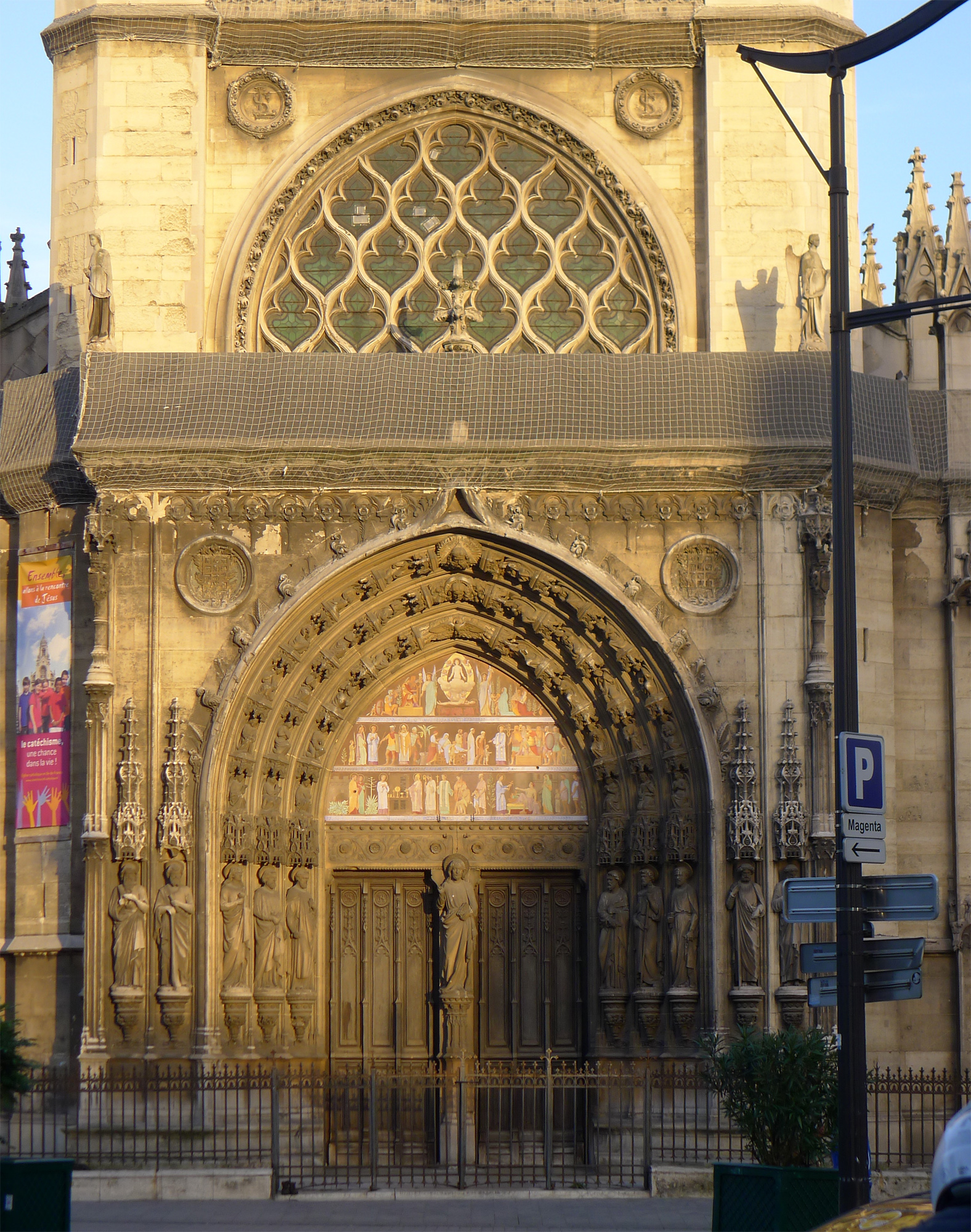
Portal and rose window on the west front

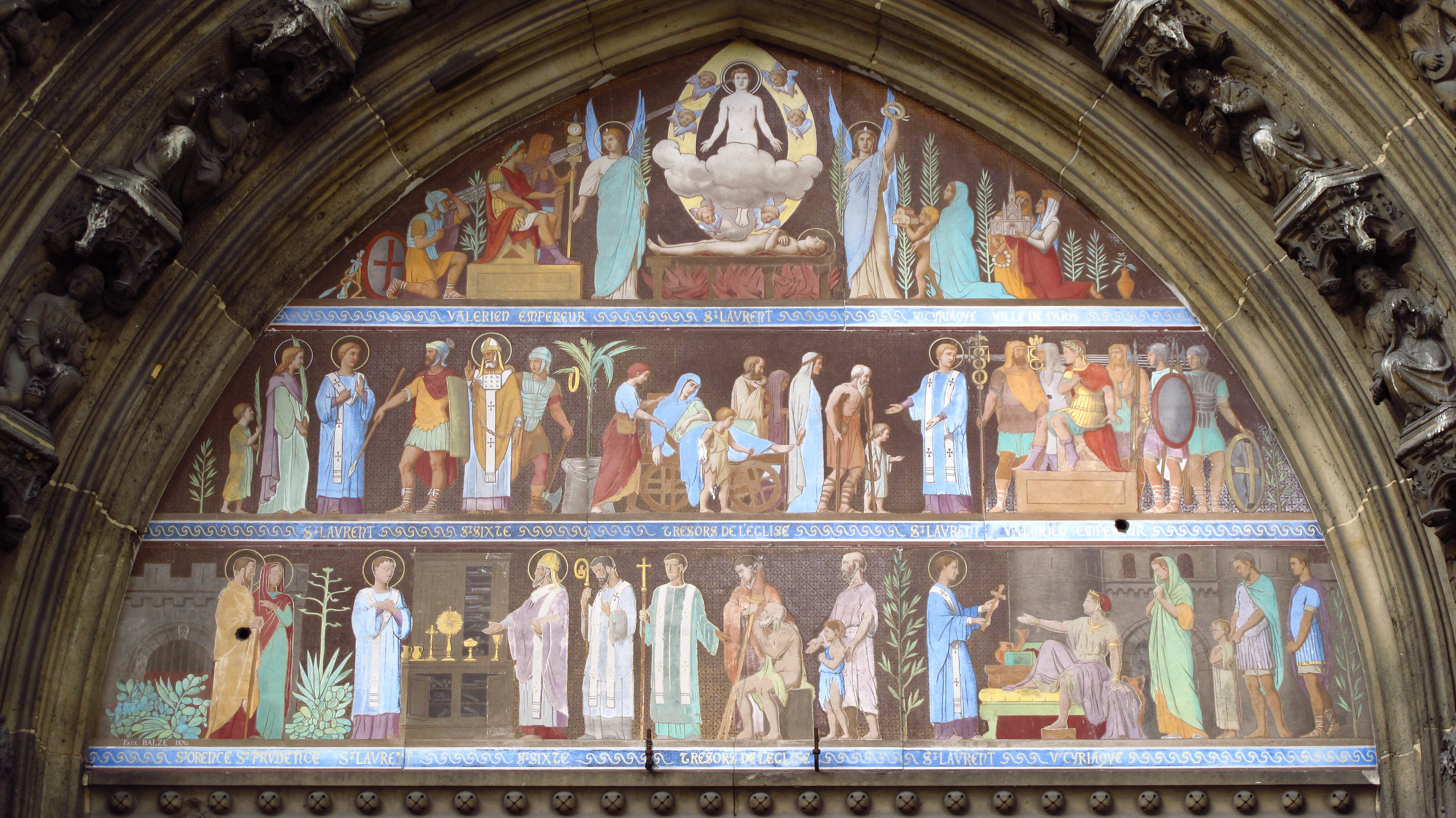
"The Passion of Saint Lawrence" by Jean-Paul Baize (1870)

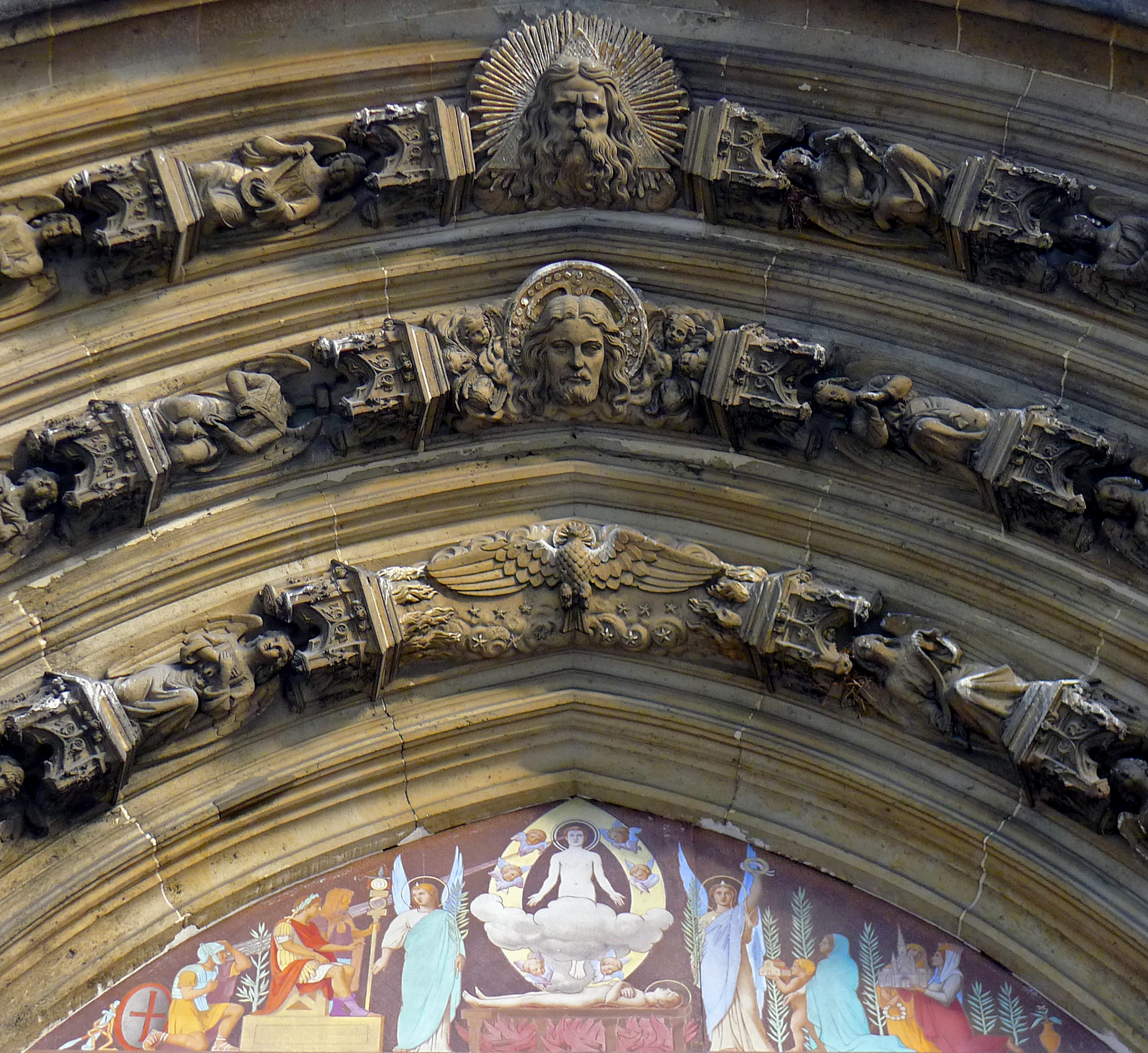
Sculpture in the archivolts depicting the Father, Son and Holy Spirit

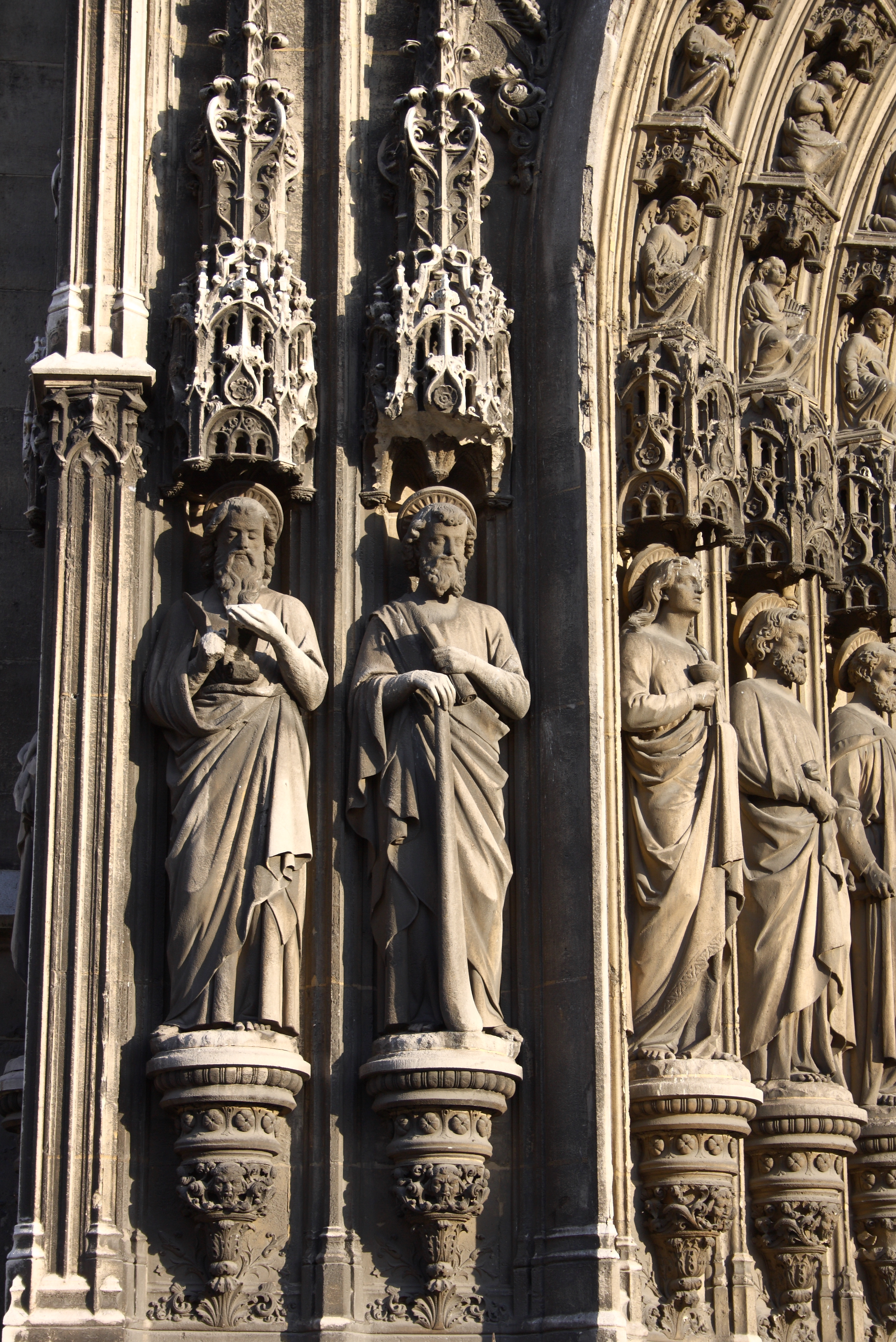
Sculptures of the Apostles in the archivoltes

== Interior ==
The elevations of the interior of the church, is simplified from earlier Gothic churches; has just two levels of equal height; an upper level with large windows, and a lower level of massive arcades of pillars. flanked by double side aisles for easy circulation. The side aisles also give access to a row of small chapels.

=== Choir ===
The choir of the church was begun in the first half of the 15th century, when the church was entirely rebuilt. It was then extensively modified in the 1650s by the architect Antoine Lepautre (1621 – about 1691). He created the very elaborate coats of arms on the arcades, the arcades and front on of the axis, and the Corinthian capitals on the columns. The woodwork decoration of the pillars was added when the facade was rebuilt between 1862 and 1865. The stone altar dates to 1884, and was built by A. Chertier.

The stained glass windows of the choir were created between 1932 and 1939 by the Atelier Gaudin founded by Pierre Gaudin (1908–197). They replaced earlier windows installed in 1846 by Laminators de Nozan.

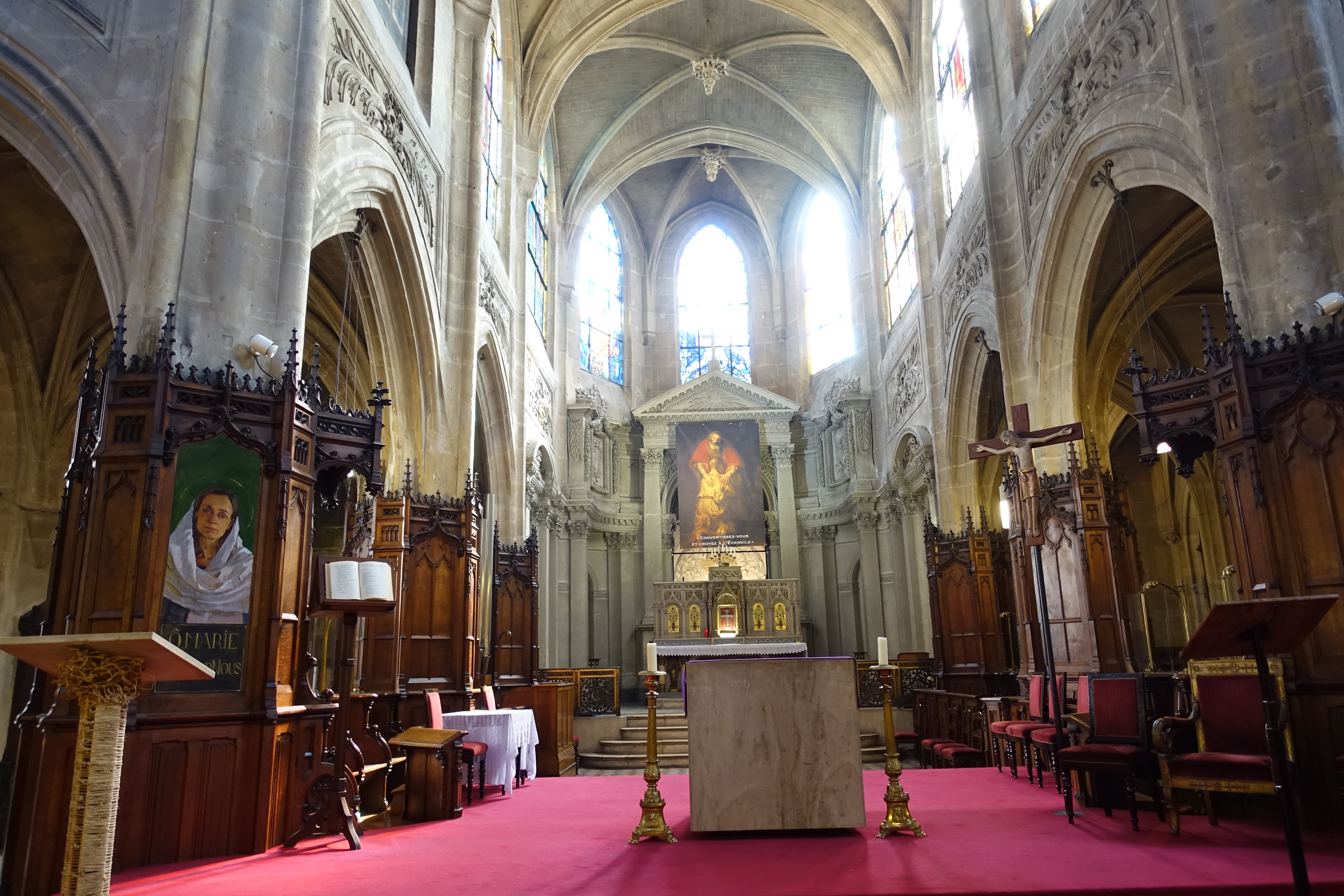
The Choir

=== Transept ===
The transept which divides the nave from the choir is slightly elevated from the nave and choir, and features two chapels. The north chapel is dedicated to Saint Lawrence, while the south chapel is dedicated to Saint Genevieve, the patron saint of Paris. Both chapels have elaborate carved woodwork from the 19th century, and large 19th century paintings of the two saints; the portrait of Saint Lawrence is by Louis Boulanger, and depicts his martyrdom. The portrait of Saint Genevieve is by Emile Leconte-Vernet. Above the woodwork of both chapels are bas-relief sculptures of angels holding a coat of arms.

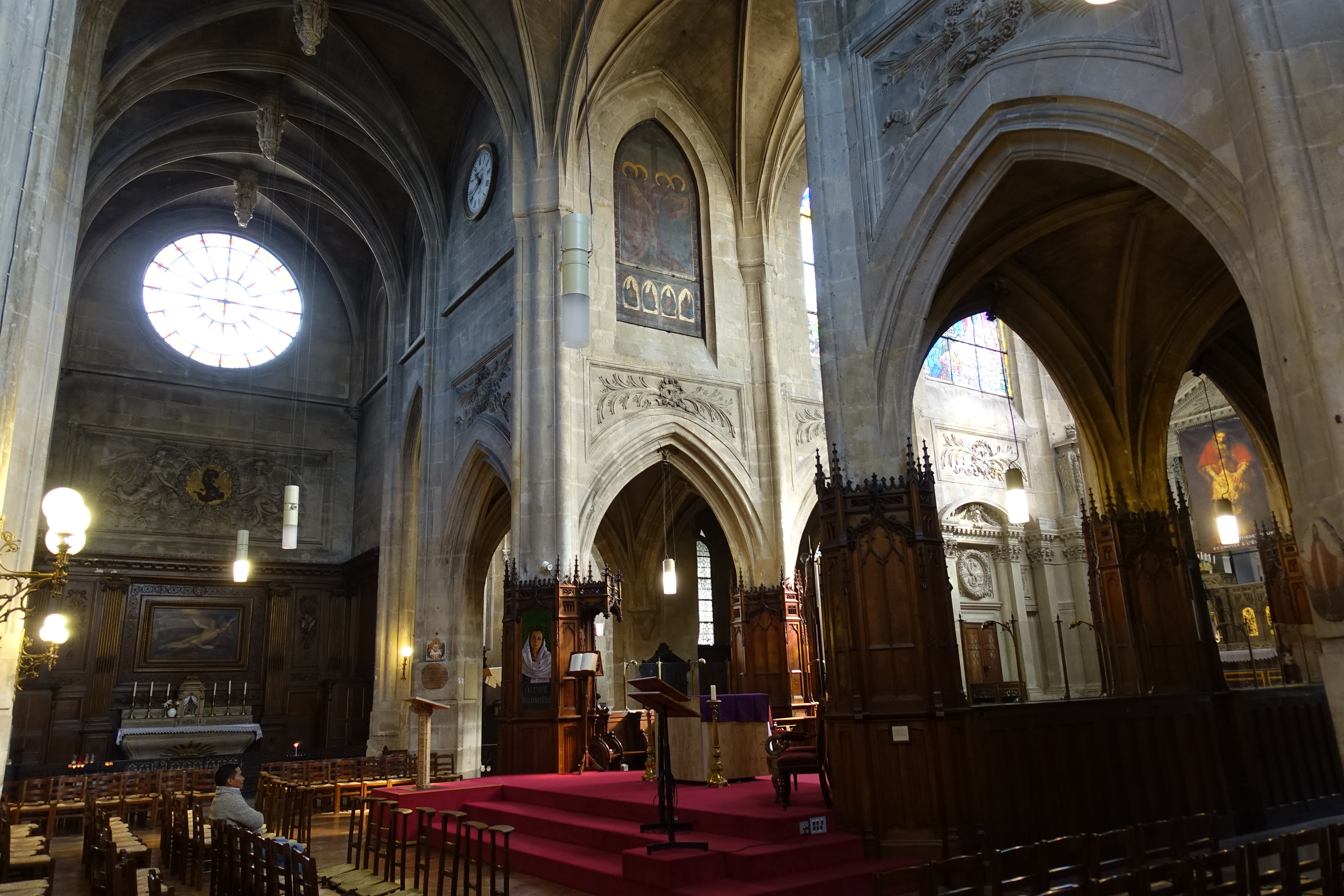
The transept (left) meets the choir (right).

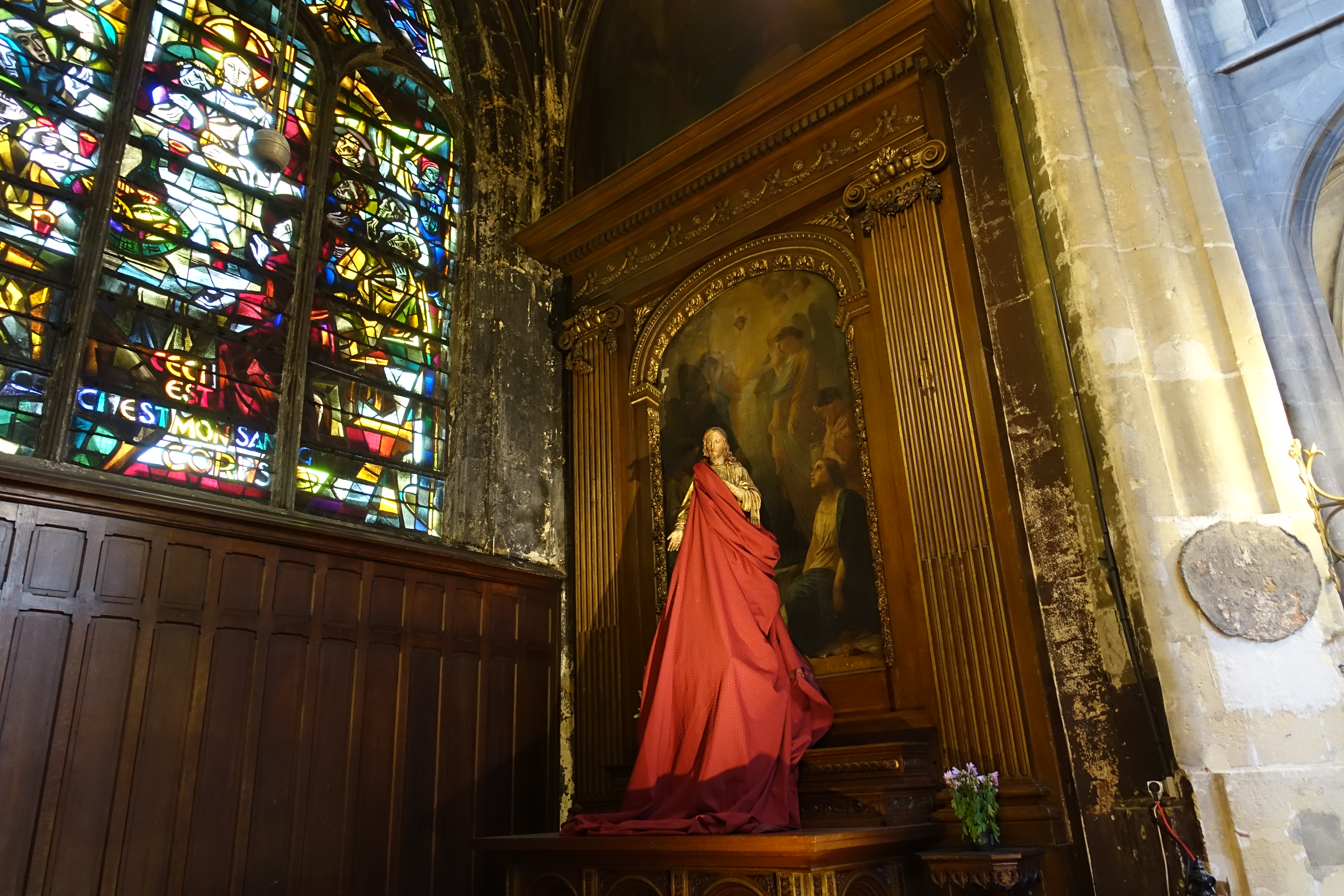
Chapel in the transept

=== Nave and tribune ===
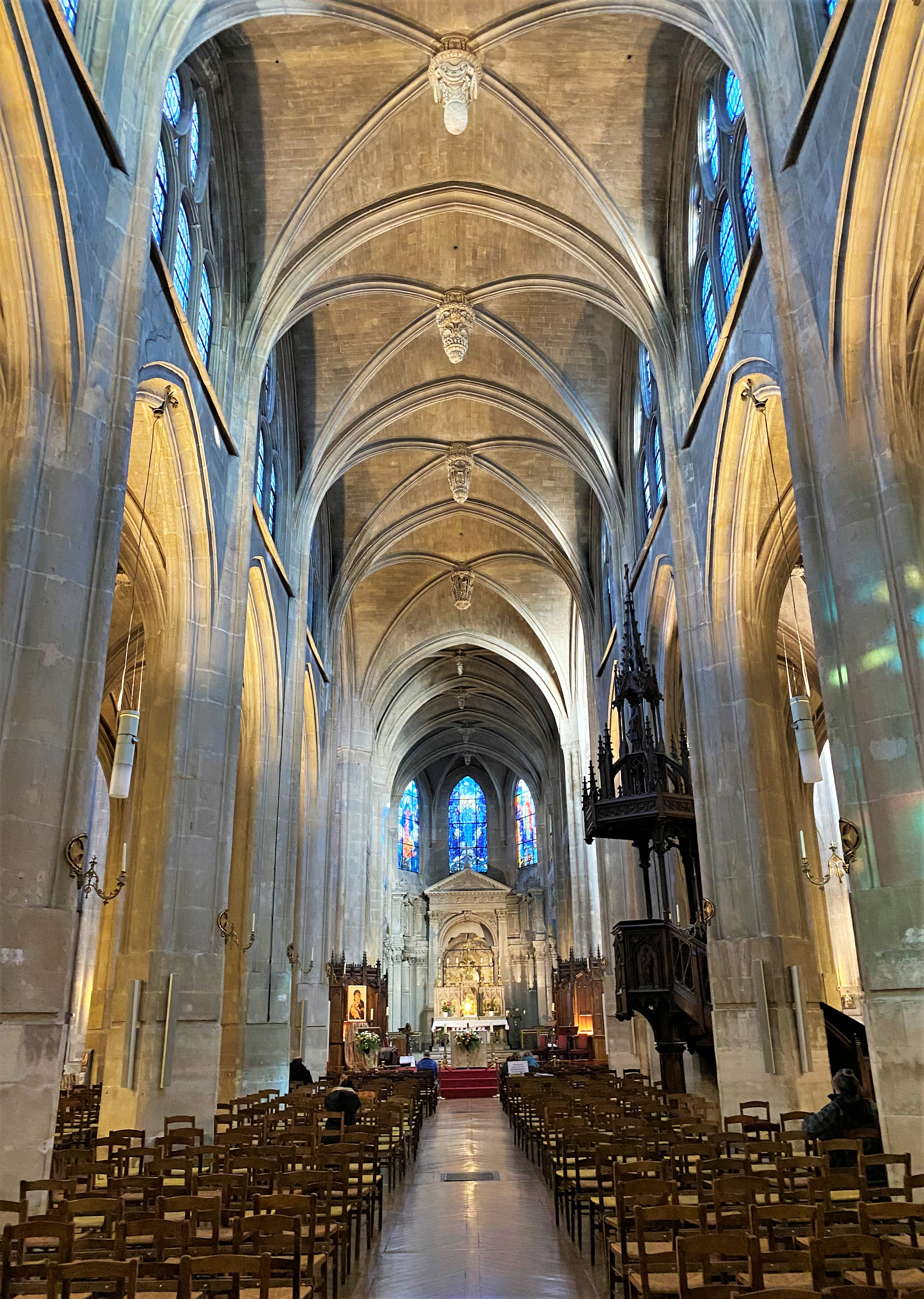
The nave, looking toward the choir

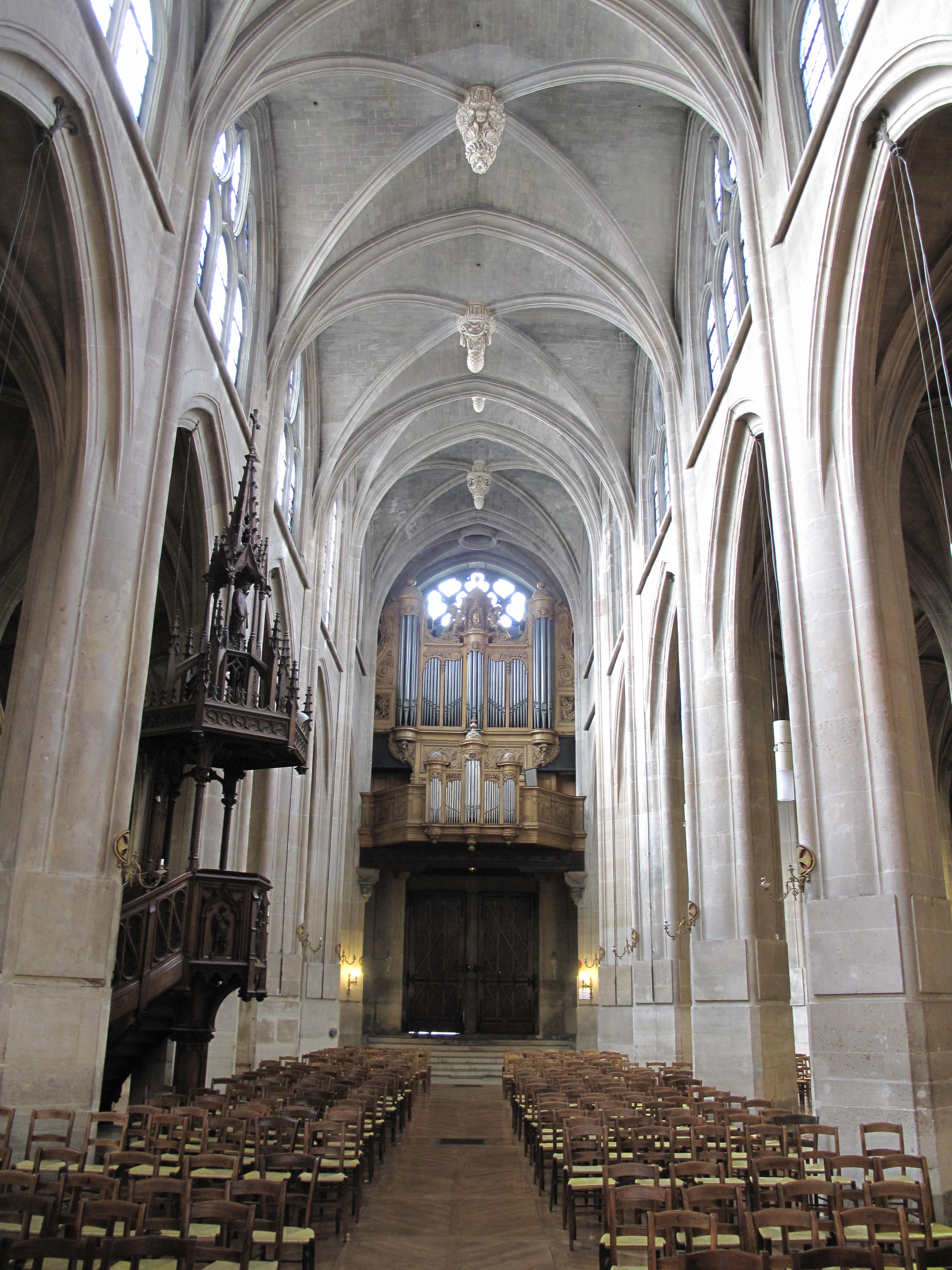
The nave looking toward the tribune and grand organ

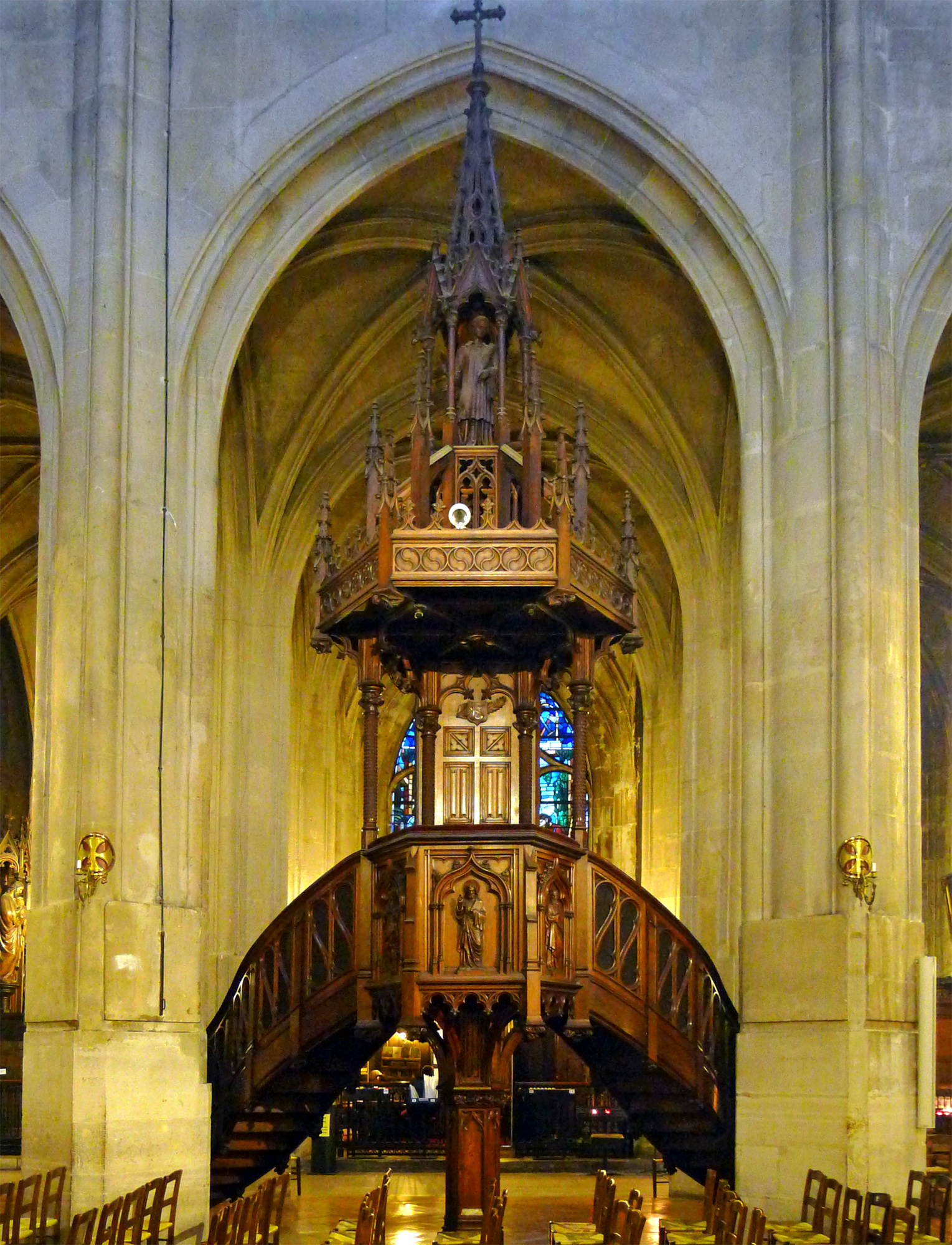
The pulpit, located in the nave

=== Chapel of the Virgin ===
The Chapel of the Virgin is an oval chamber located in the apse of the church, behind the choir, and visible from the nave. It was built in 1712 in the classical style, with dramatic classical pilasters, and replaced an earlier chapel built in 1429. The statue of the Virgin was made by the studio of Raffl in 1900. It is carved of Carrara marble. The vault is decorated with a circular painting of the Assumption of the Virgin, in 1730, as well as a painting of the Sacrifice of Abraham, both made by Antoine-Denis Postel. The stained glass windows of the chapel were commissioned in 1872 from the workshop of Antoine Lusson.

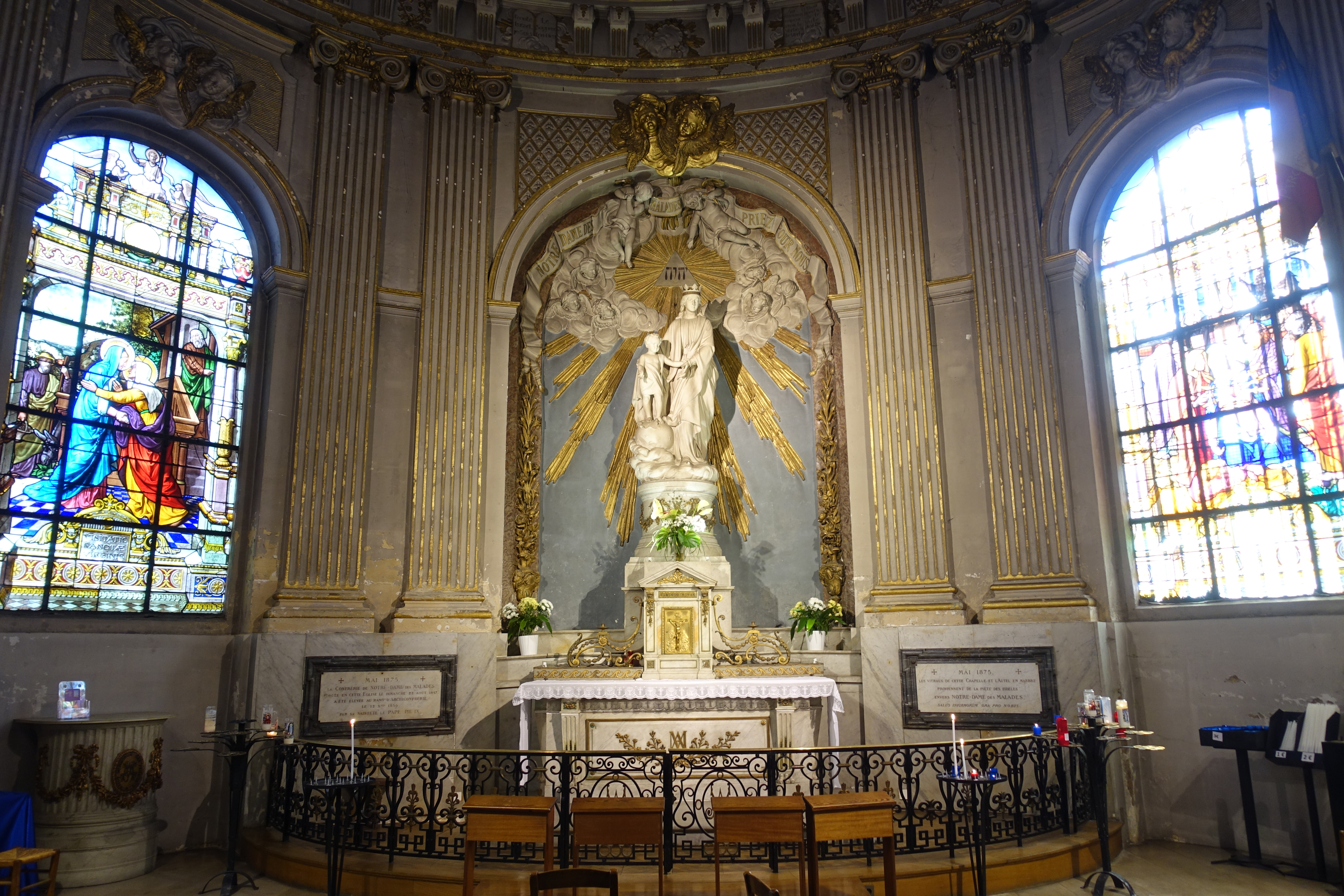
Chapel of the Virgin

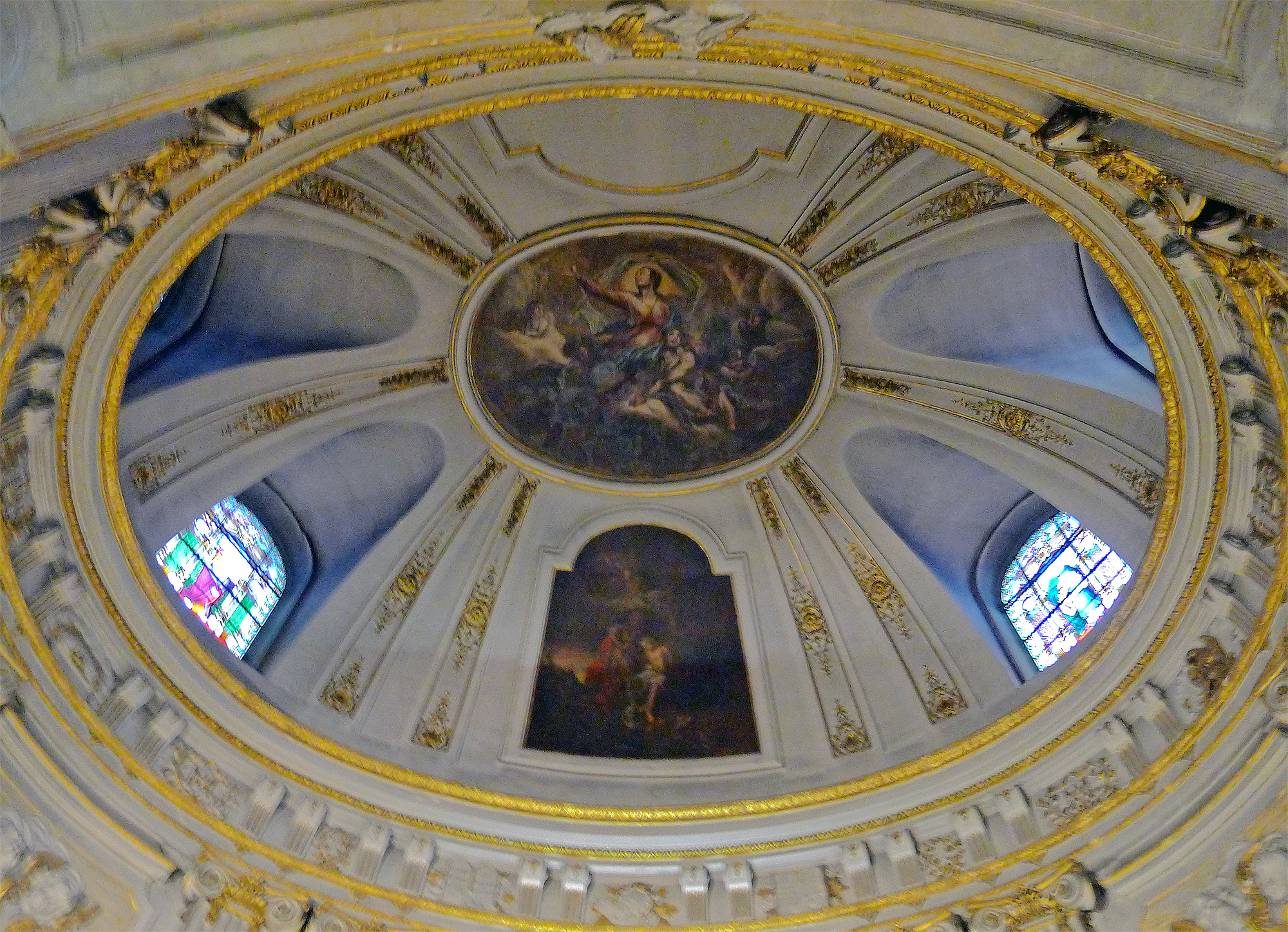
"The Assumption of the Virgin" by Antoine-Denis Postel, (1730), in the Chapel of the Virgin

== Art and decoration ==
=== Stained glass (19th century) ===
The church has a collection of stained glass windows, dating from the 19th and 20th centuries. They present a history of the development of French stained glass in the 19th century.

Before the 1850s the windows in the church were mostly clear glass or glass with simple geometric patterns. to admit a maximum of light. The windows in the chapels were oftenn covered with curtains. This began to change in the 19th century, after a visit to London by the Count of Chabrol in 1823. He admired the London church windows, and commissioned several windows from British glassmakers for the Saint Elizabeth of Hungary Church, Paris He also brought British glassmakers to Paris to train French craftsmen at the Saint-Laurent workshop.

One of the earliest existing windows in the church depicts Saint Lawrence. It was made in 1846/47 by Ernest Lami de Nozan (1801–1877), based on a design by Auguste-Nicolas Galimard (1813–1880). They also made the window of the Apostles(1846–47), depicting Saints John, Paul, and Peter, as well as Judas.

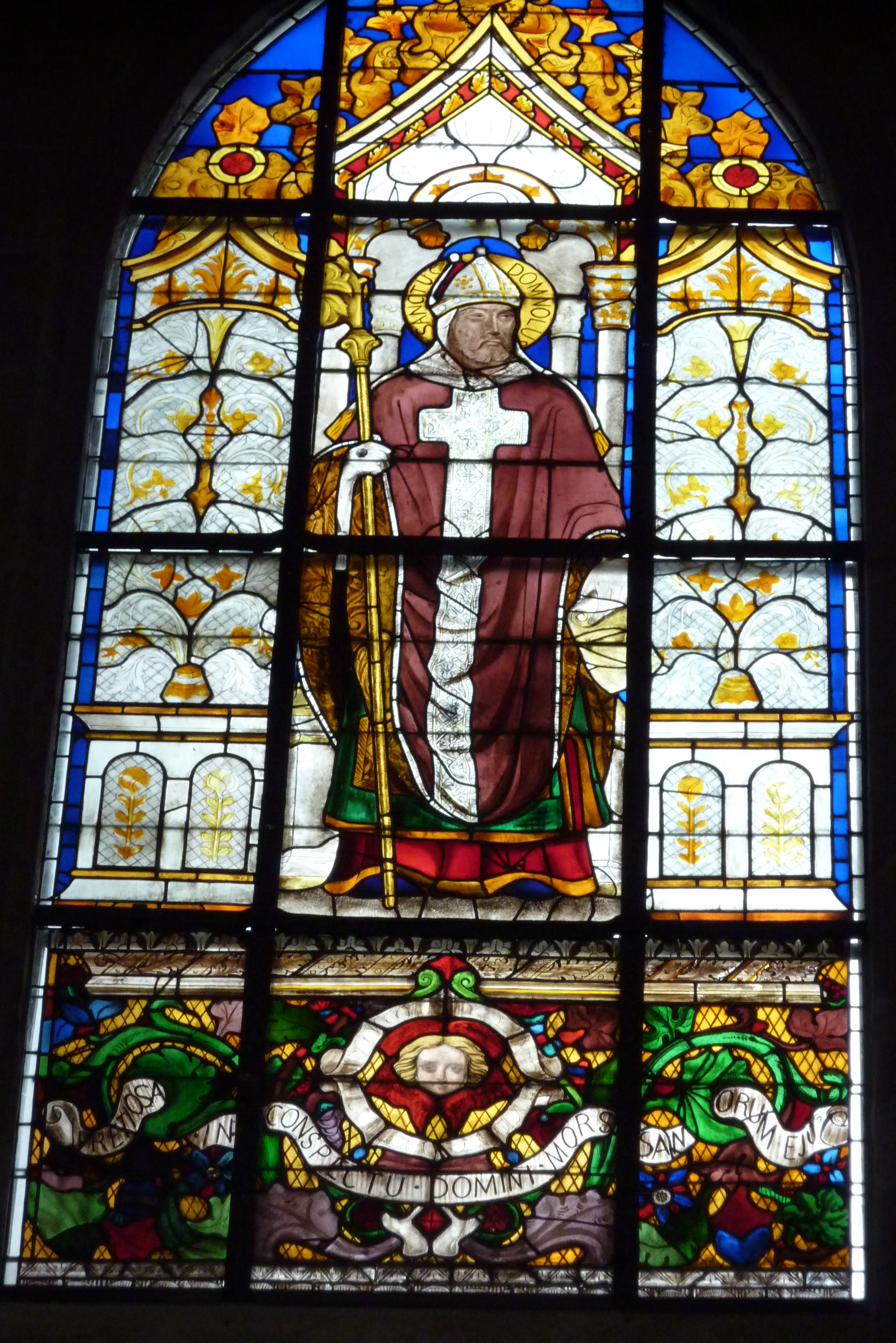
"Saint Lawrence" (1846–47) by Ernest Lami de Nozan and Auguste-Nicolas Galimard.

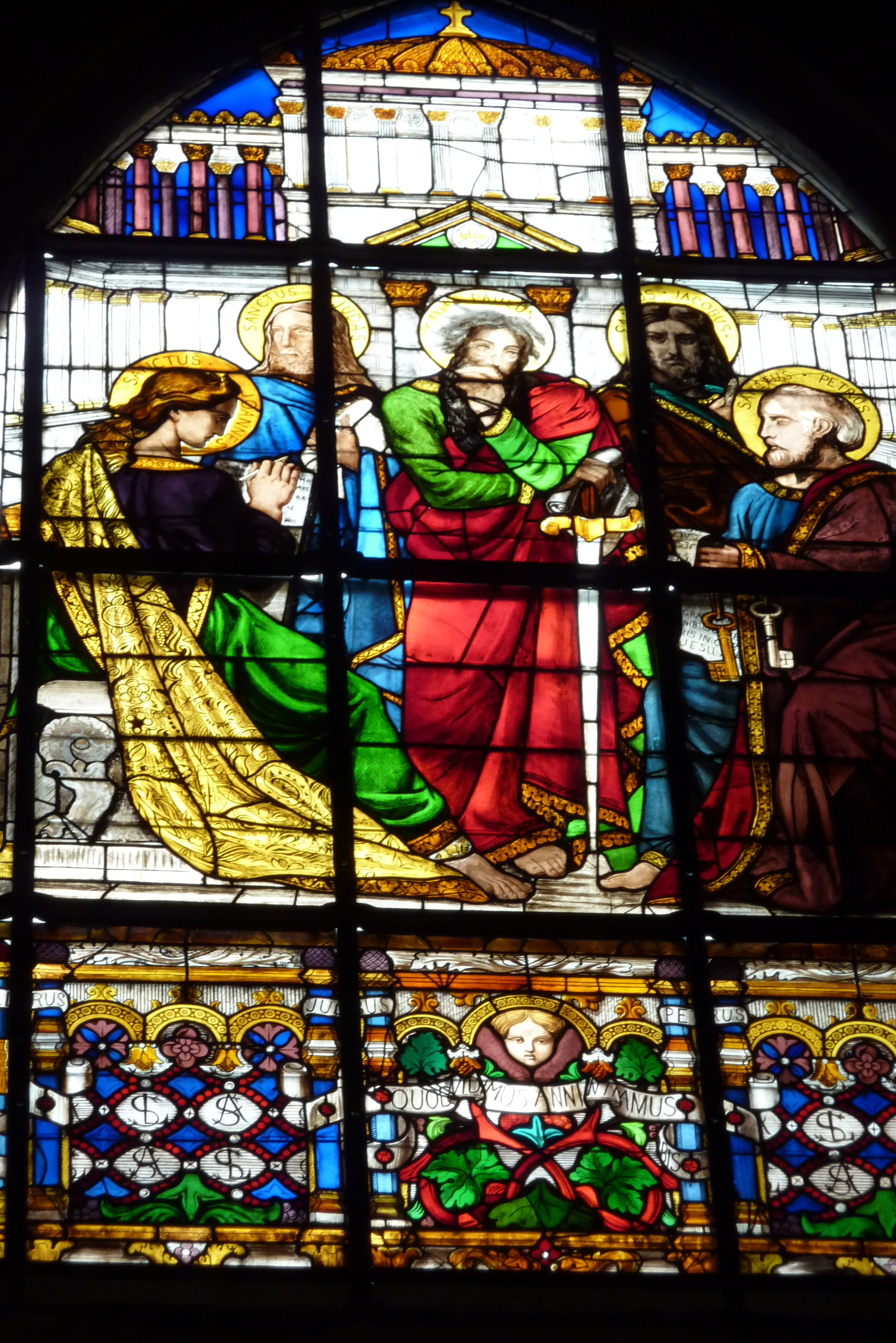
"The Apostles" (1846/47) by Ernest Lami de Nozan (1846/47)

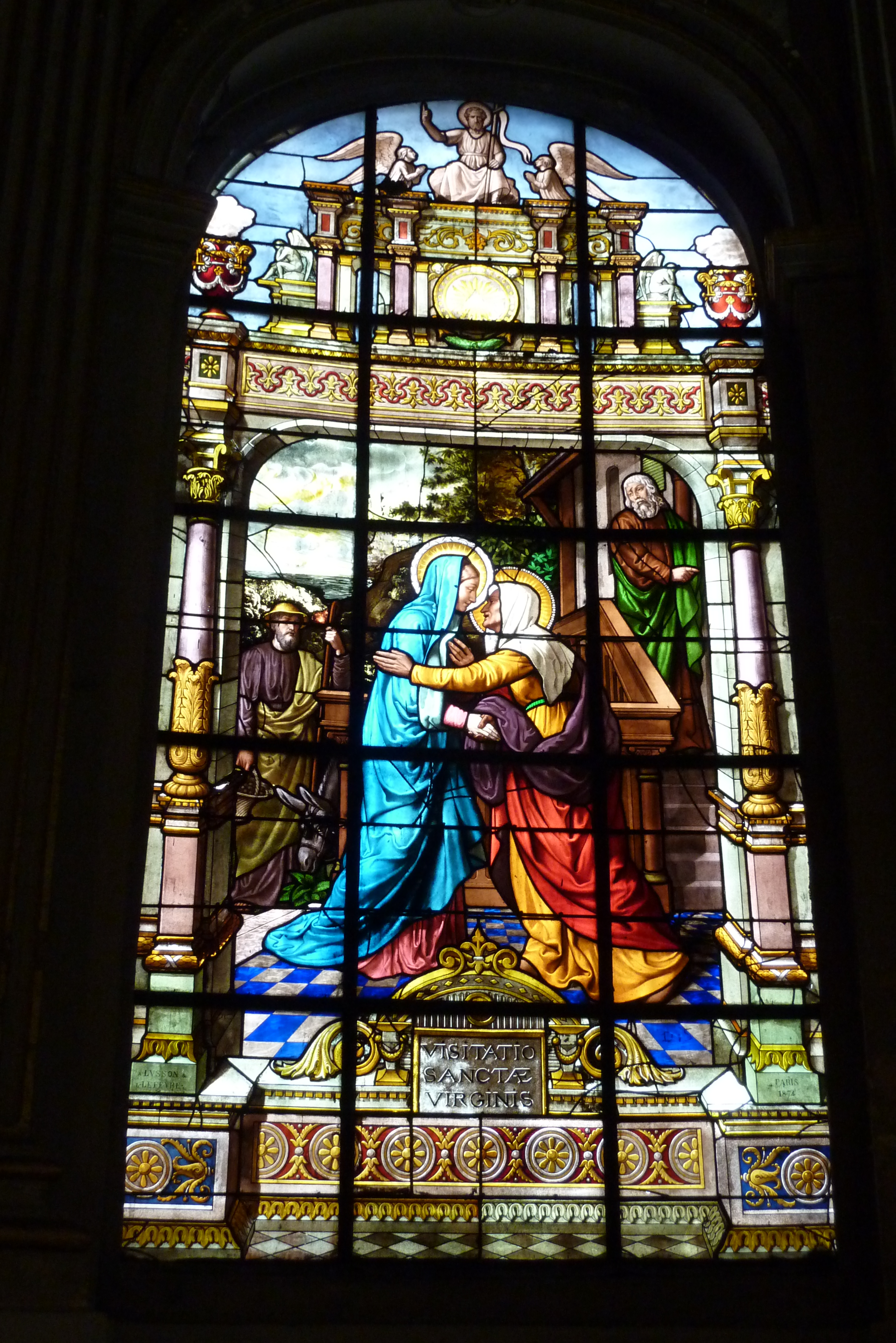
"Visitation of the Virgin", signed by Lusson and Lefevre, (1874–75).

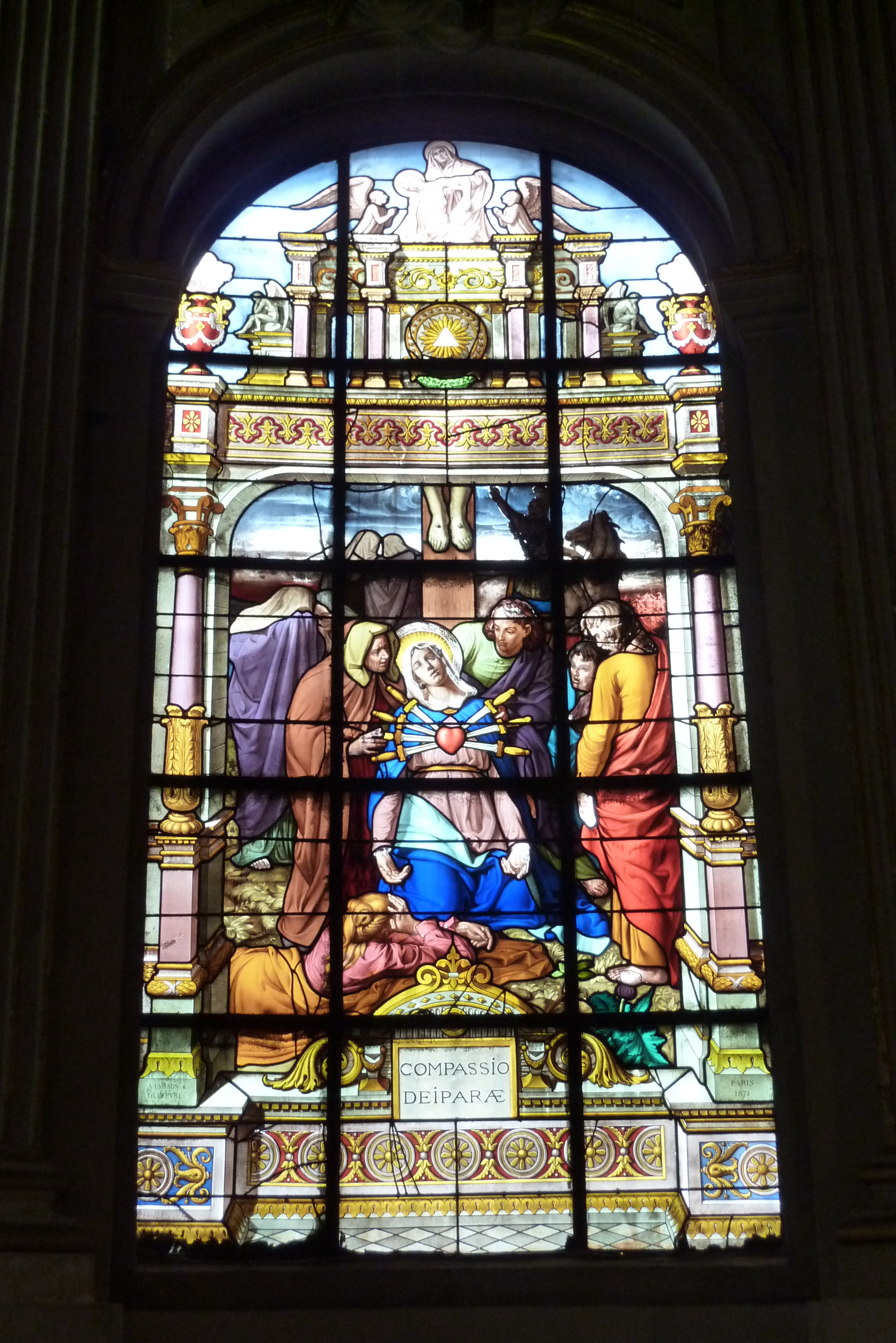
"The Seven Sorrows of the Virgin", signed by "A. Lusson & L. Lefèvre"

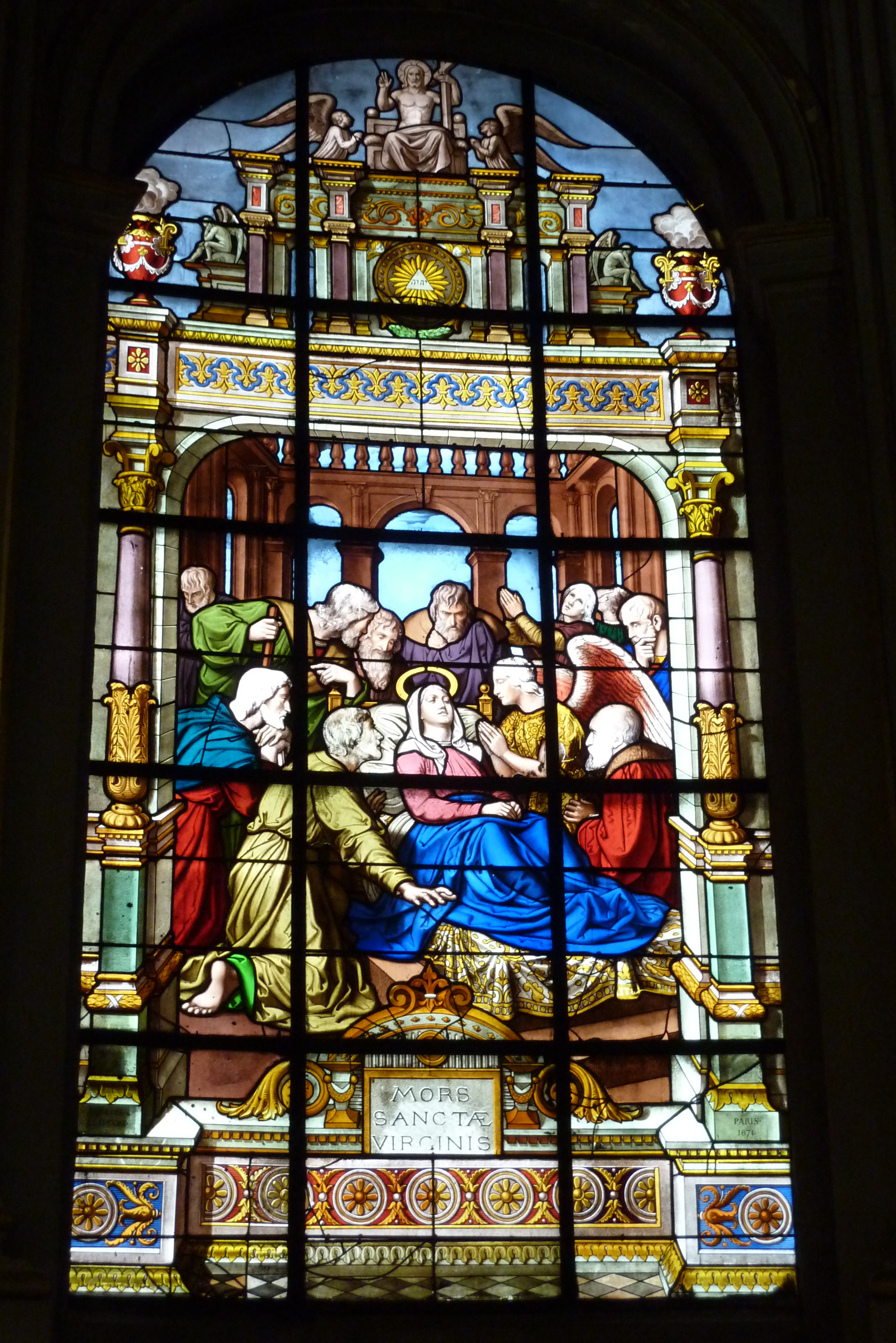
"Death of the Virgin" signed by Lusson and Lefevre, (1874).

=== Stained glass (20th century) ===
In the 20th century, new windows were commissioned from the family enterprise founded by Felix Gaudin (1851–1930) in Clermont Ferrand. The first group of new windows was commissioned between 1932 and 1939 to replace earlier windows in the choir created in 1846 by Lami de Nozan.

When Felix Gaudin died in 1930 his place was taken by his son Jean Gaudin (1879–1930). In the 1950s Jean Gaudin replaced many of the windows in the chapels with modernist designs.

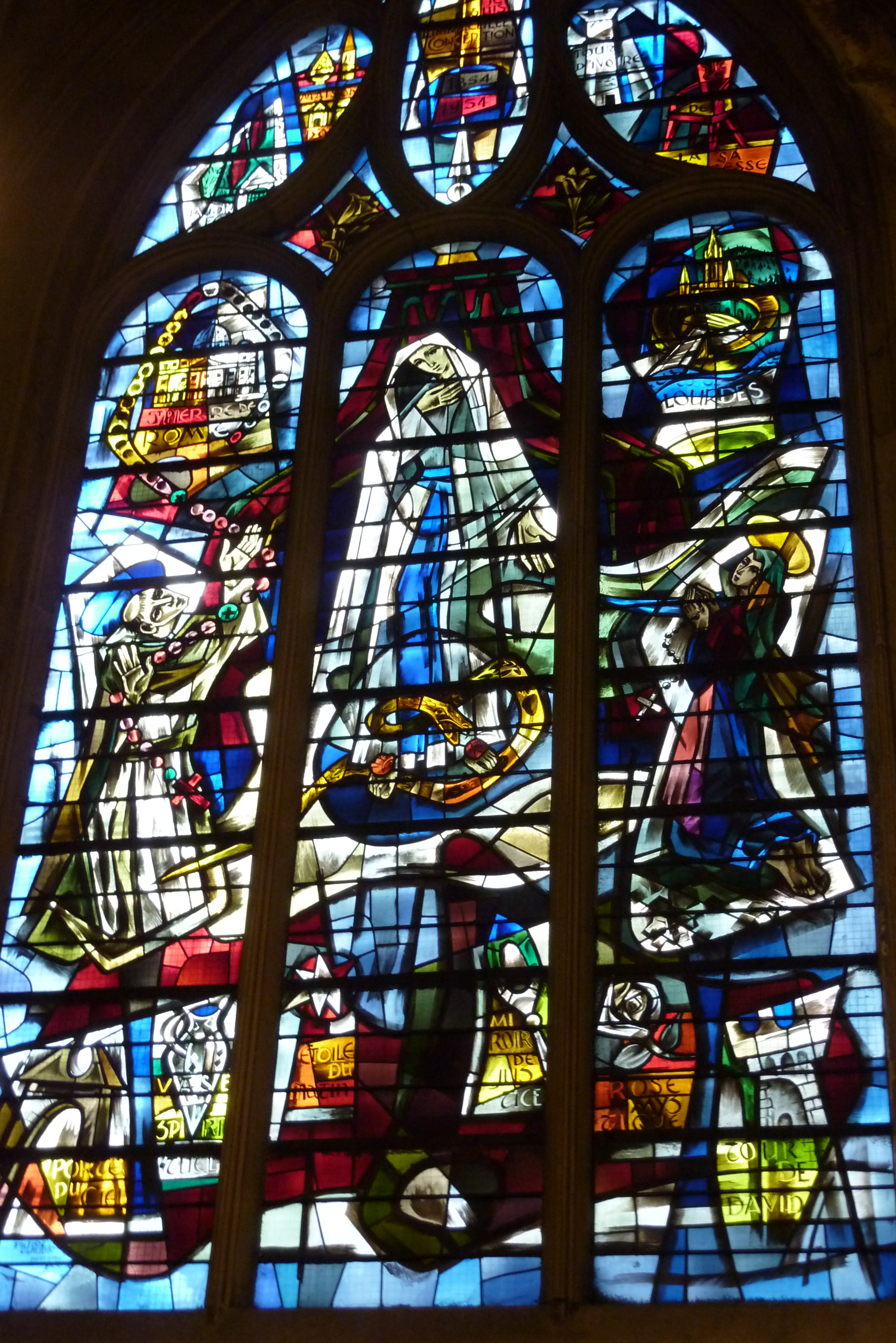
Scenes from life of Virgin Mary, by Jean Gaudin (1955)

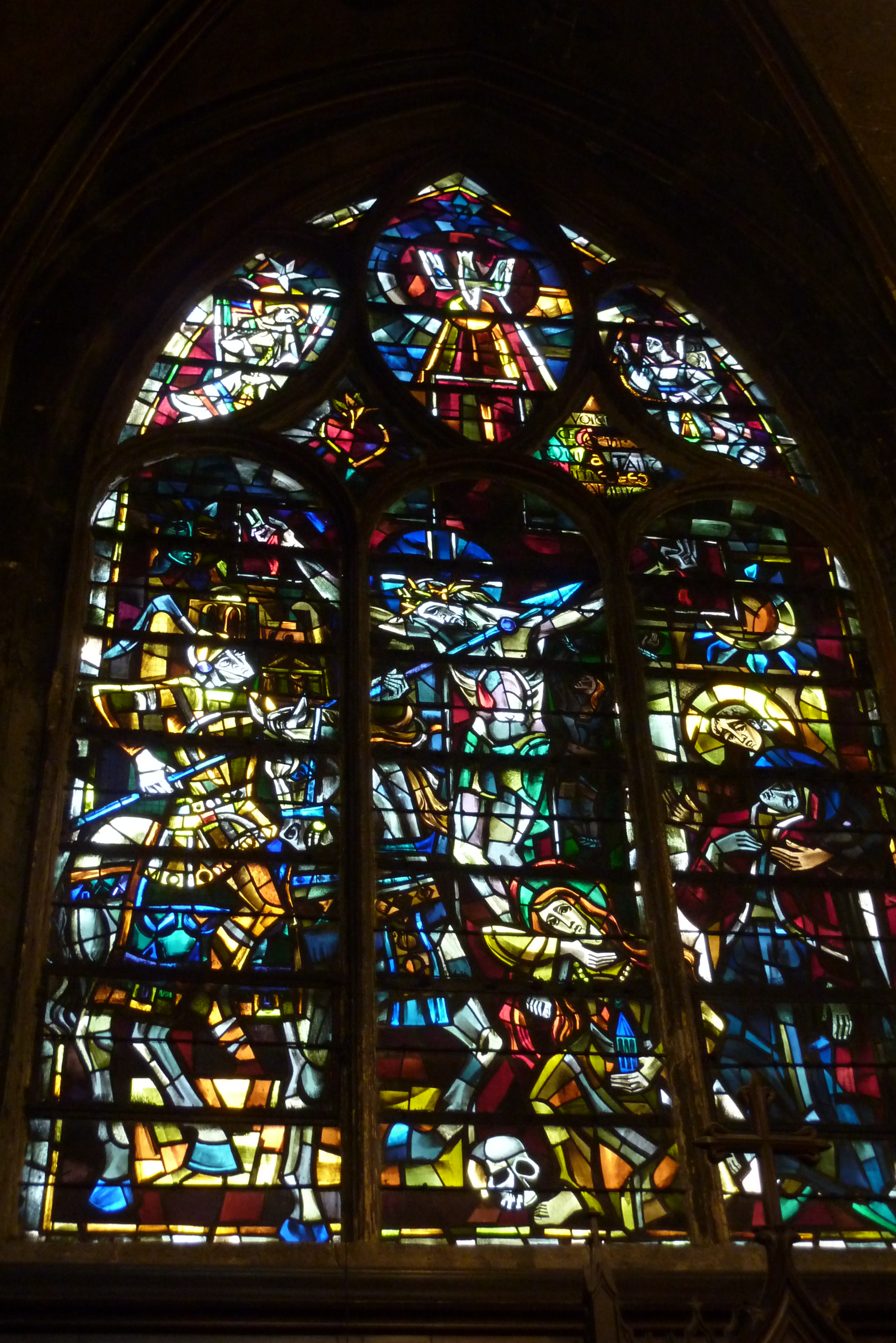
"The Crucifixion by Jean Gaudin (1953)

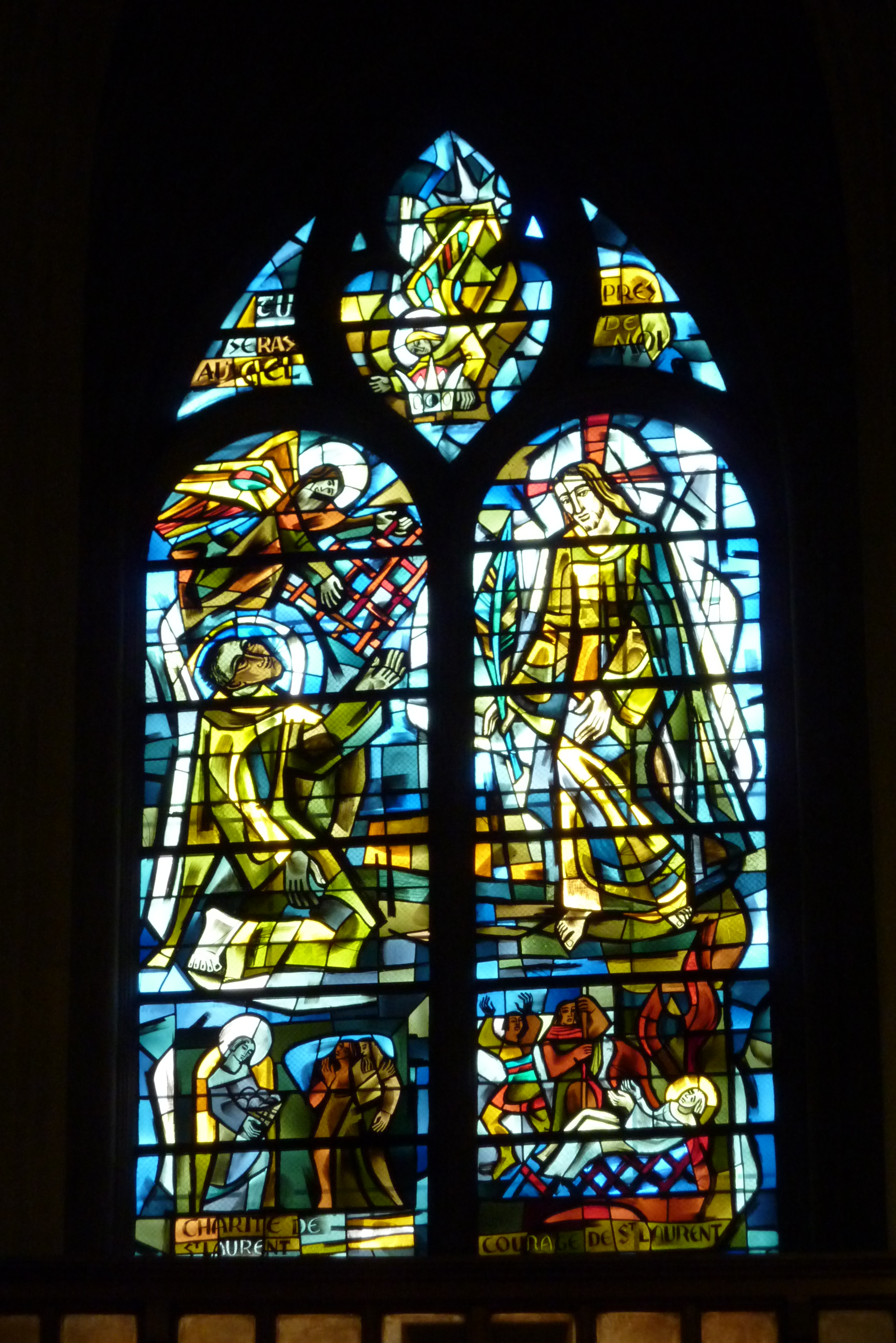
Scenes from life of Saint Lawrence by Jean Gaudin (1950s)

=== Bosses or keystones of vaults ===
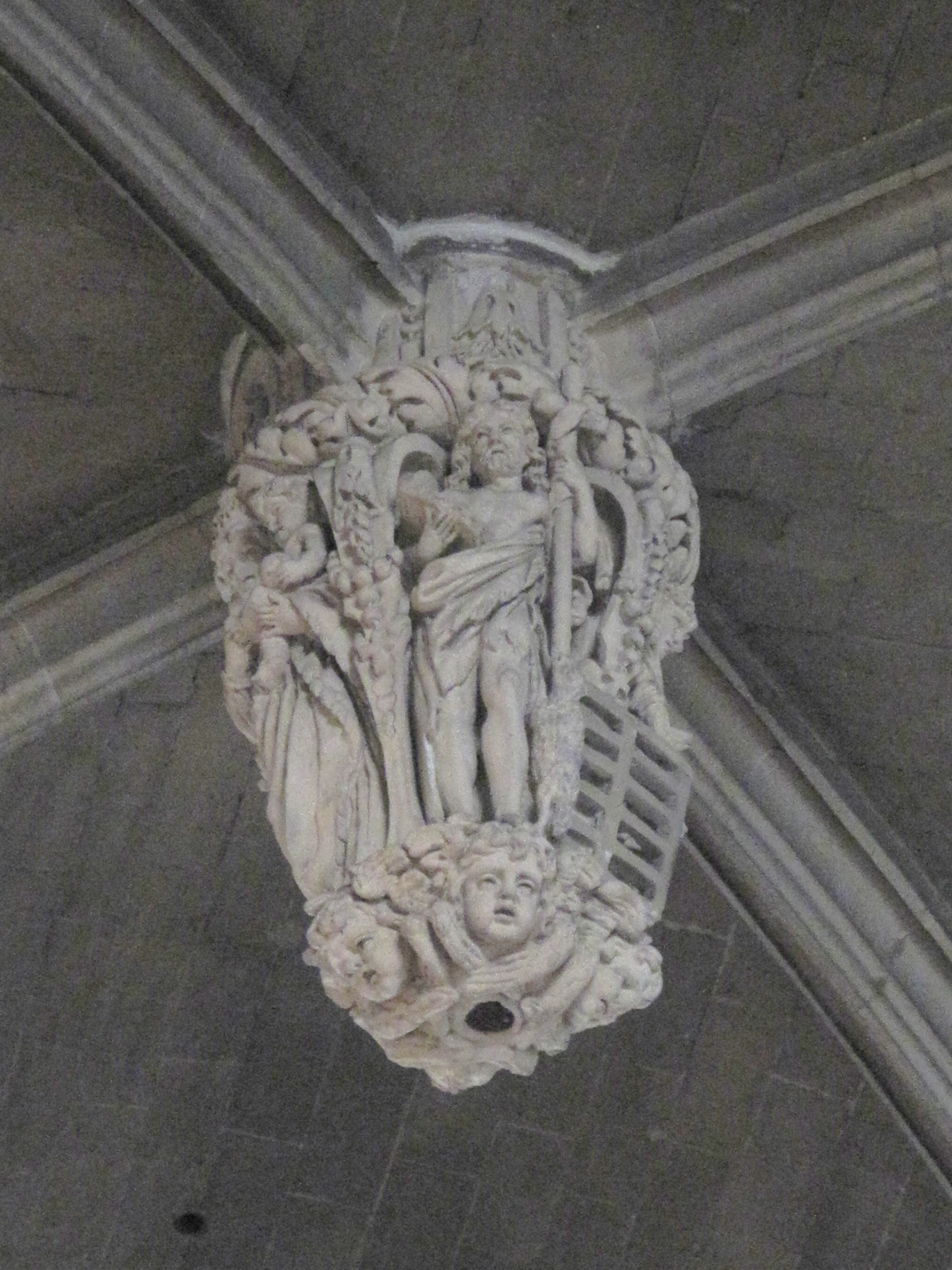
Keystone depicting "Martyrdom of Saint Lawrence"

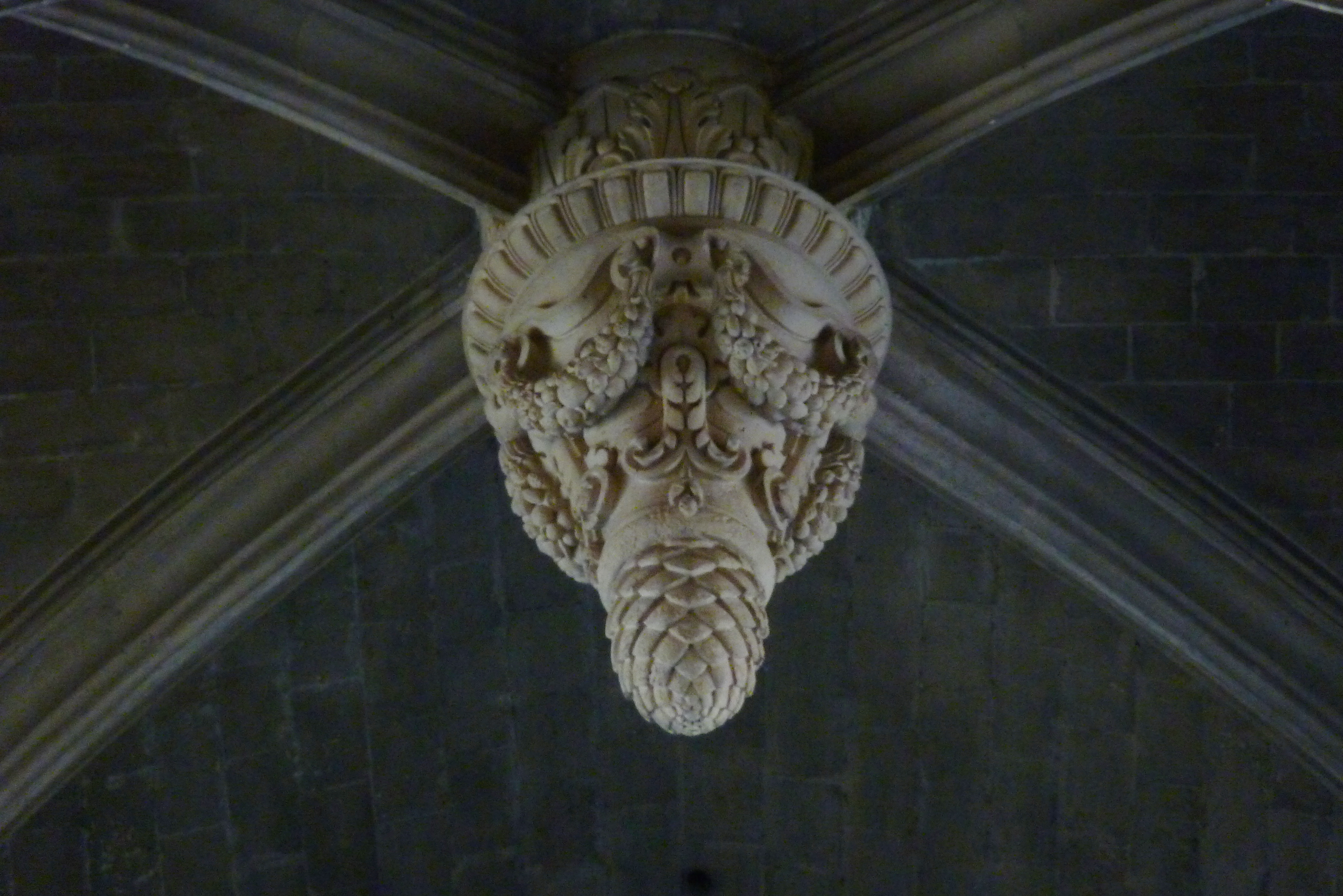
Depicting nature

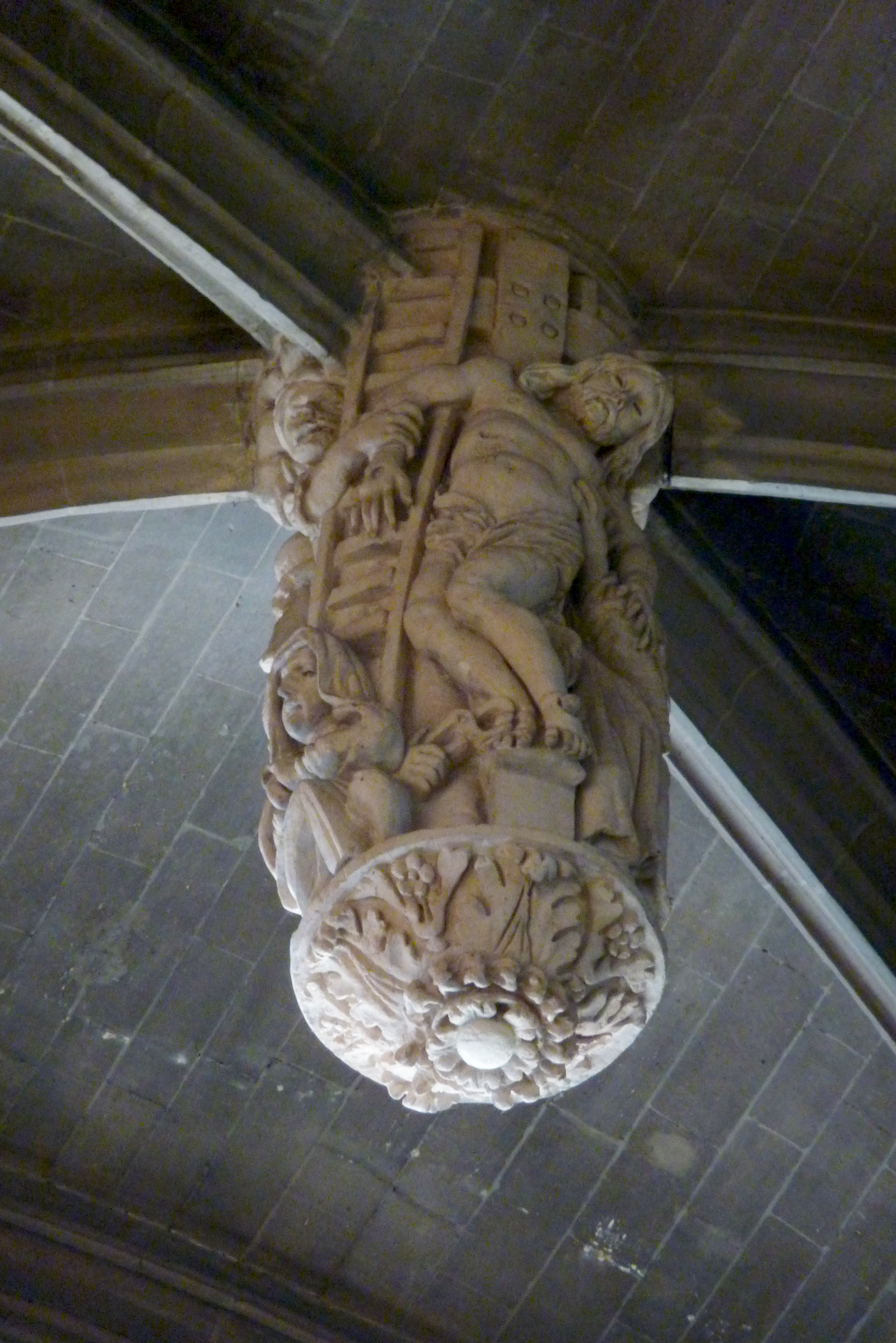
"Descent from the Cross"

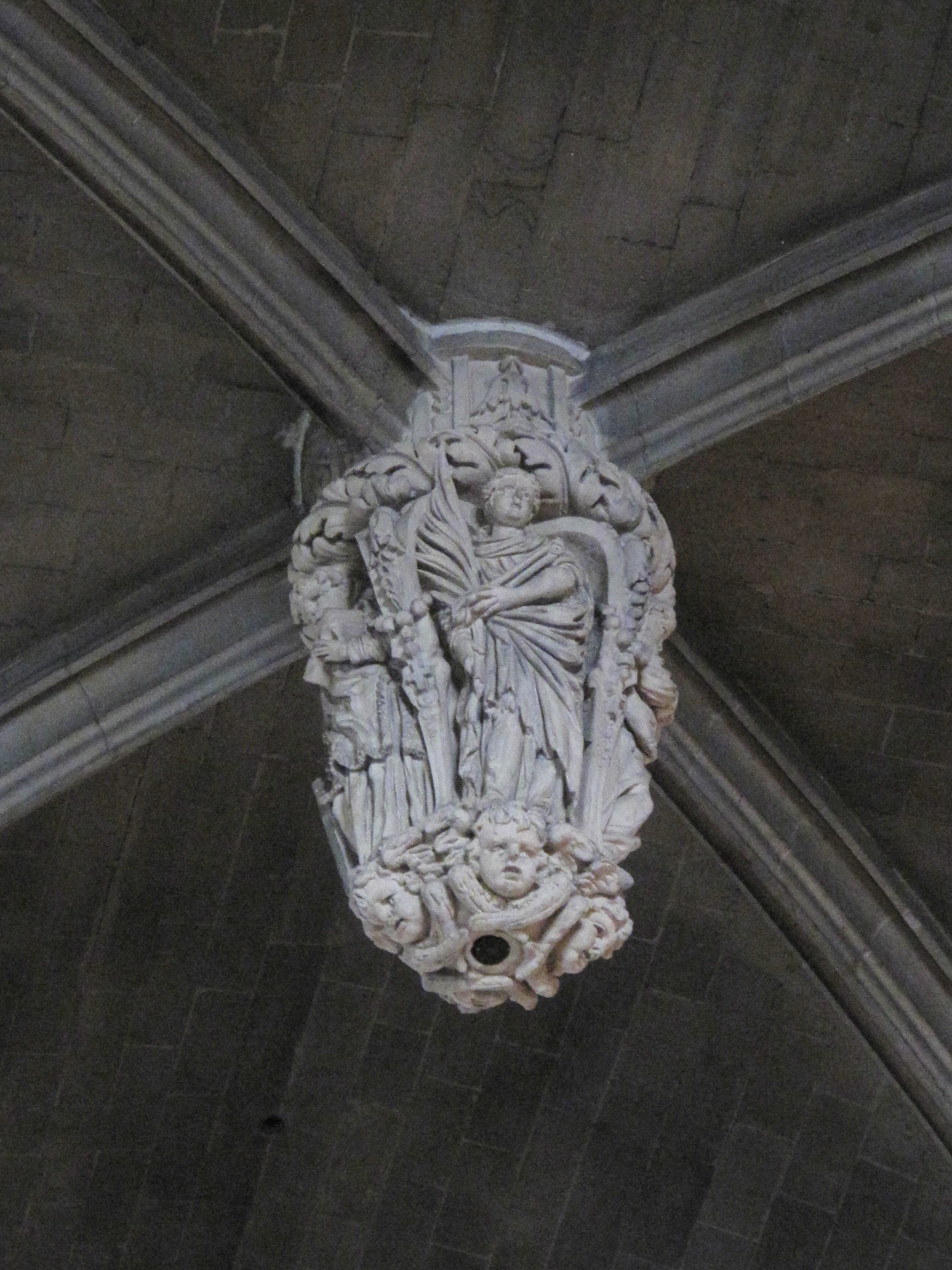
Saint Appoline

Among the distinctive features of the church are the bosses or keystones, hanging sculptures which decorate the centers of the ceiling vaults in the nave, choir and transept. These were made in 1656. ´They are very finely crafted, and each one is different, illustrating a Biblical story or theme.

=== Painting, sculpture and woodwork ===
The church is a textbook of French decorative religious art in the 19th century, with good examples of wood-carving, religious painting and sculpture.

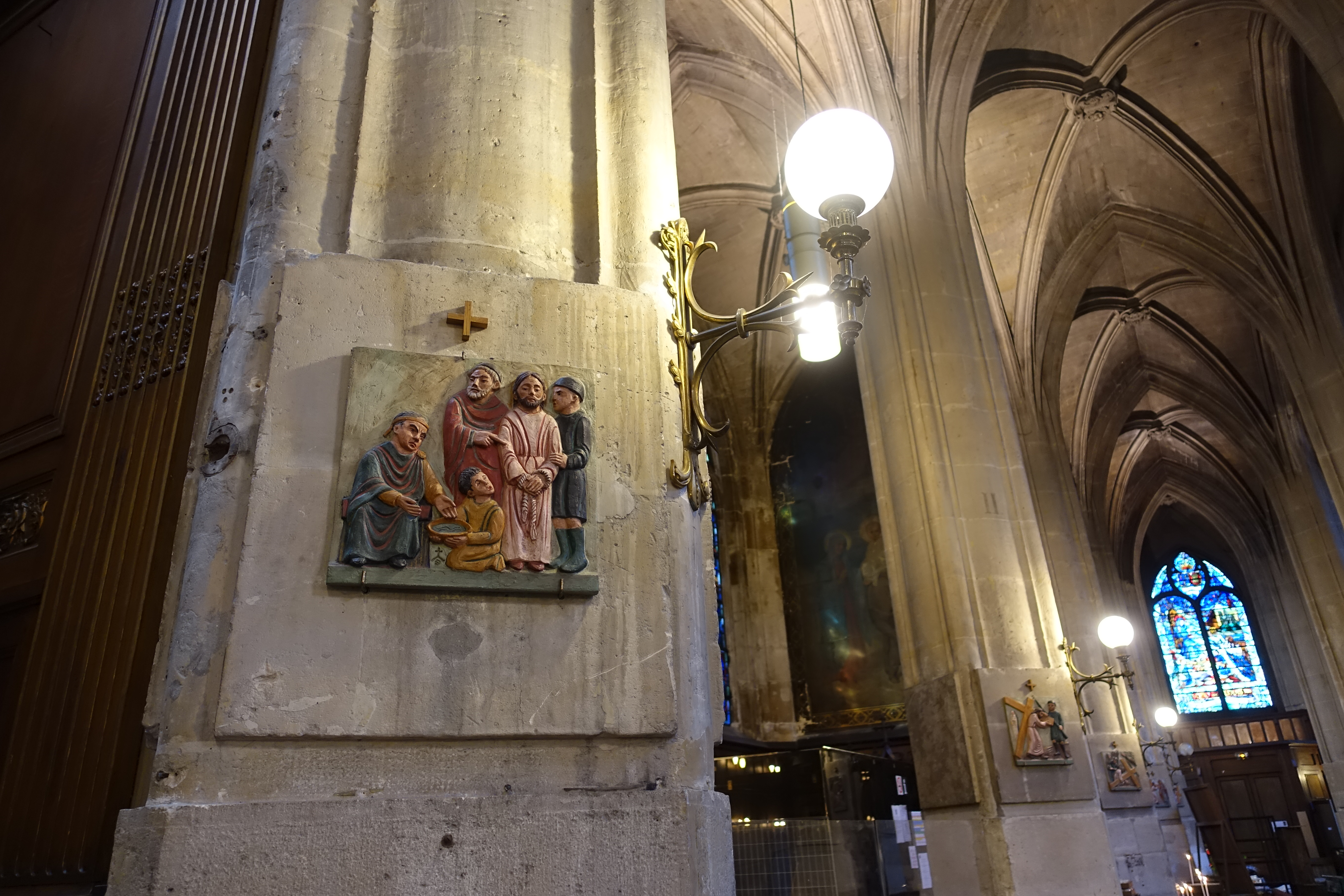
"Stations of the Cross" series in choir

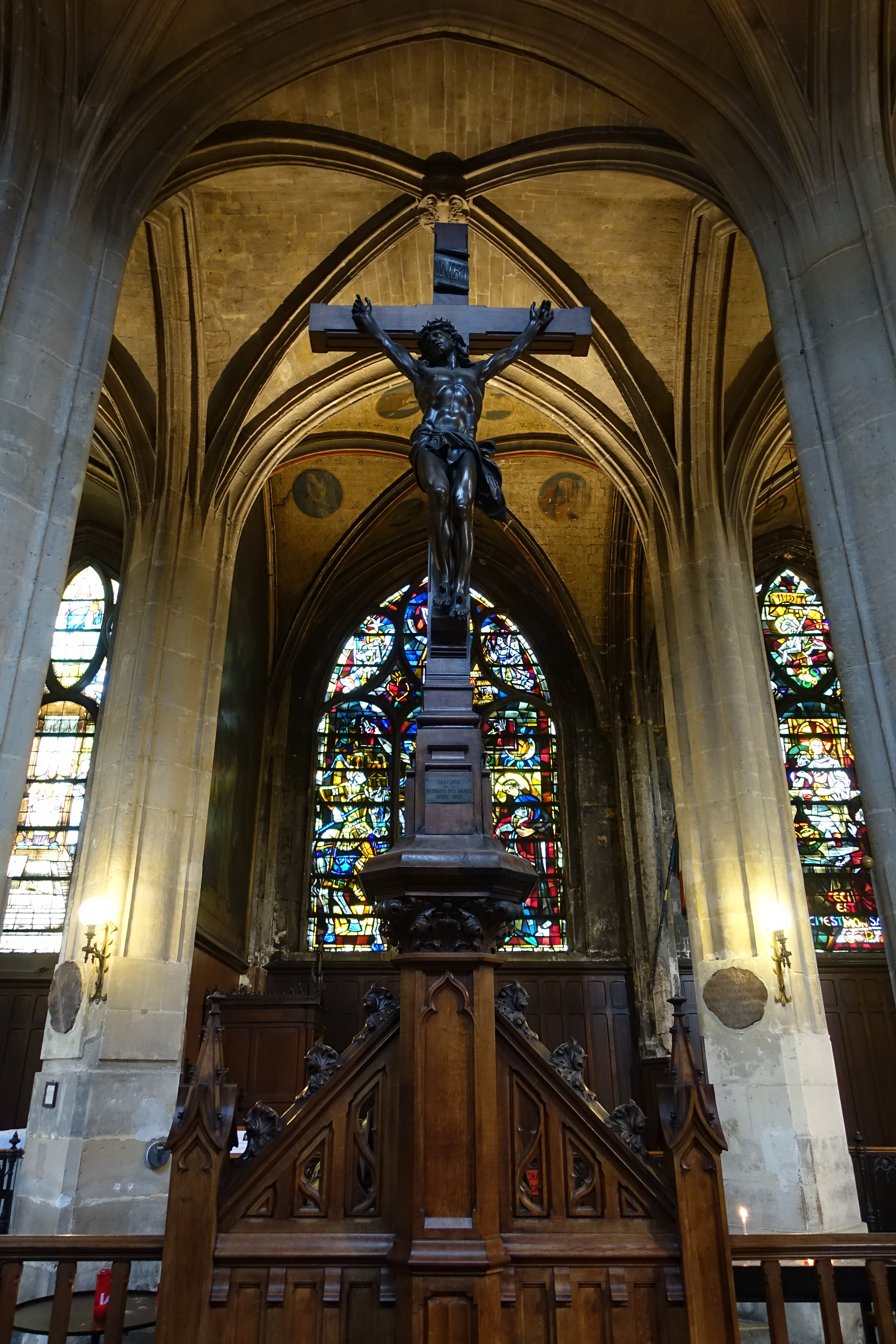
"Crucifix" in the Choir

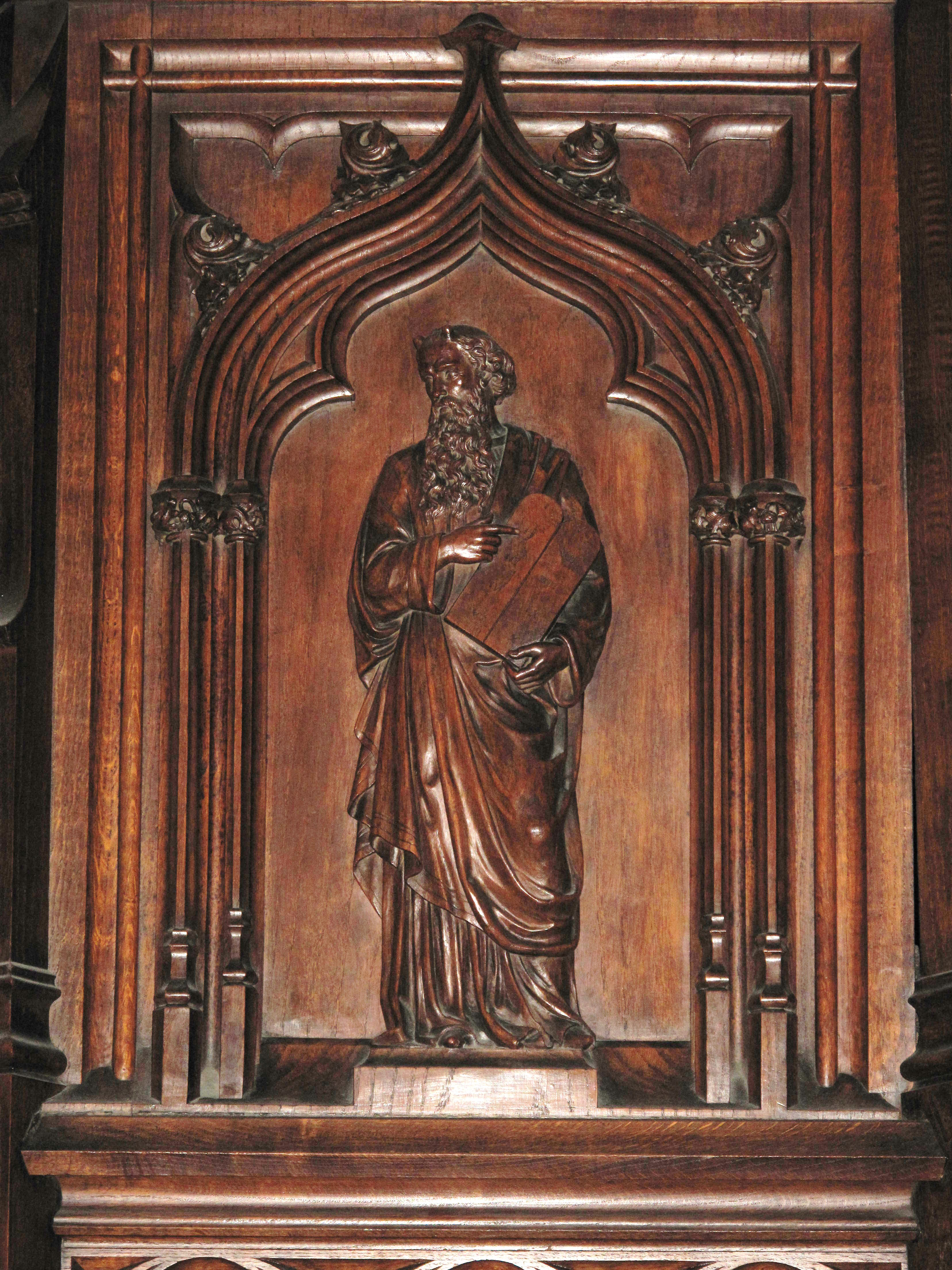
Carving if Moses on the pulpit

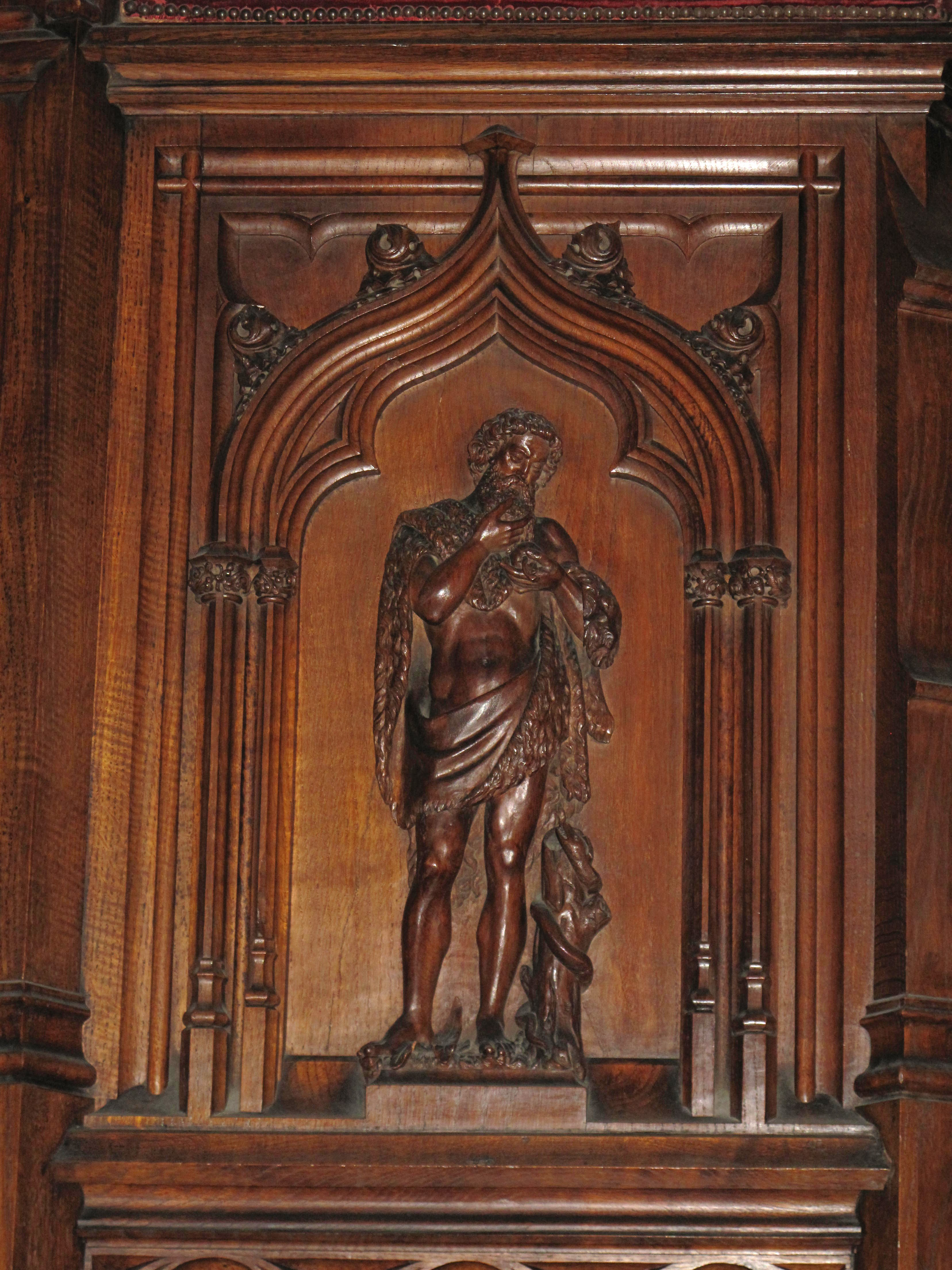
Carving of Saint John the Baptist on the pulpit (1872)

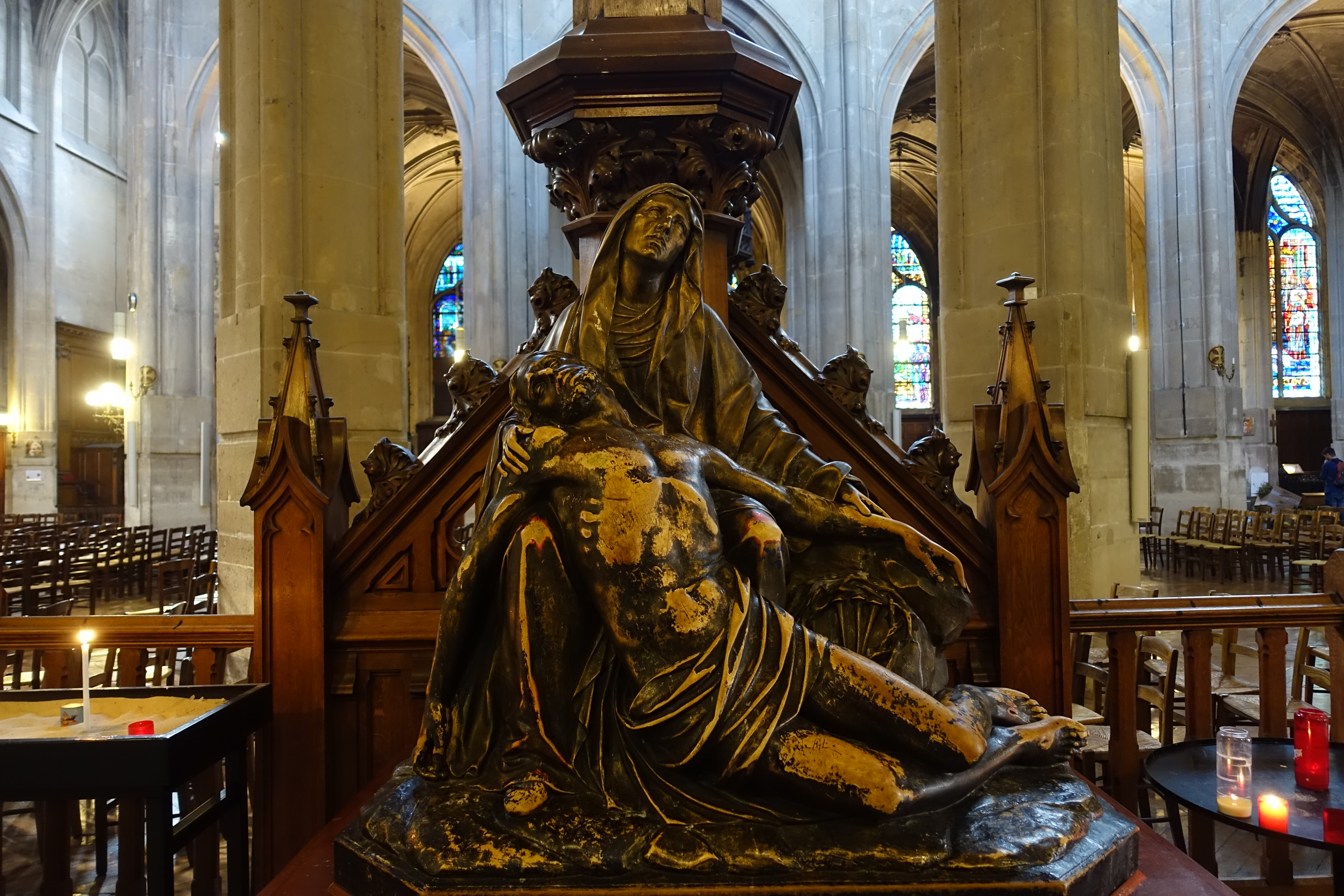
Bronze Pieta by Marrochi in the nave

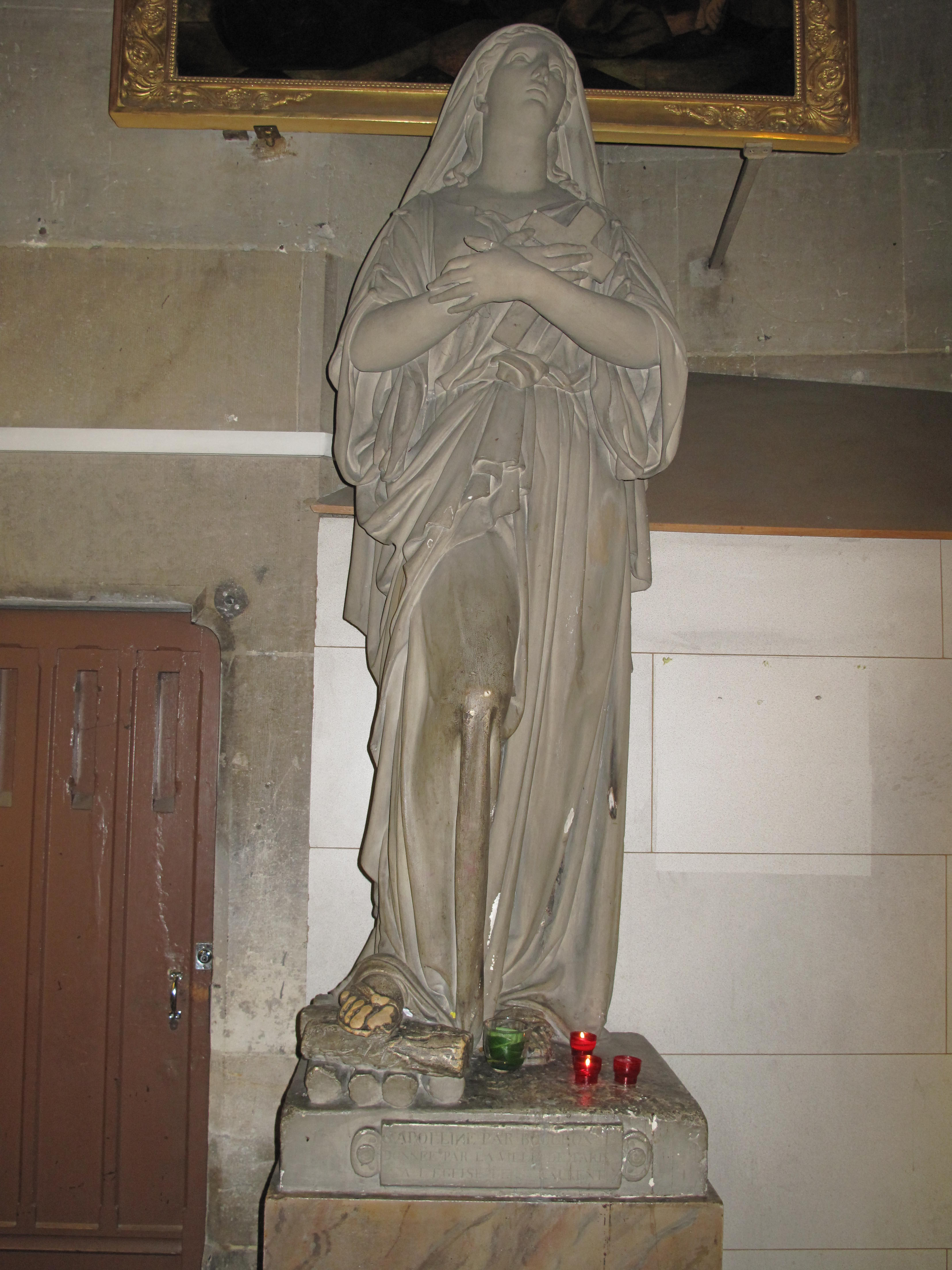
"Saint Apollonia" by Louis-Victor Bougron (1825)

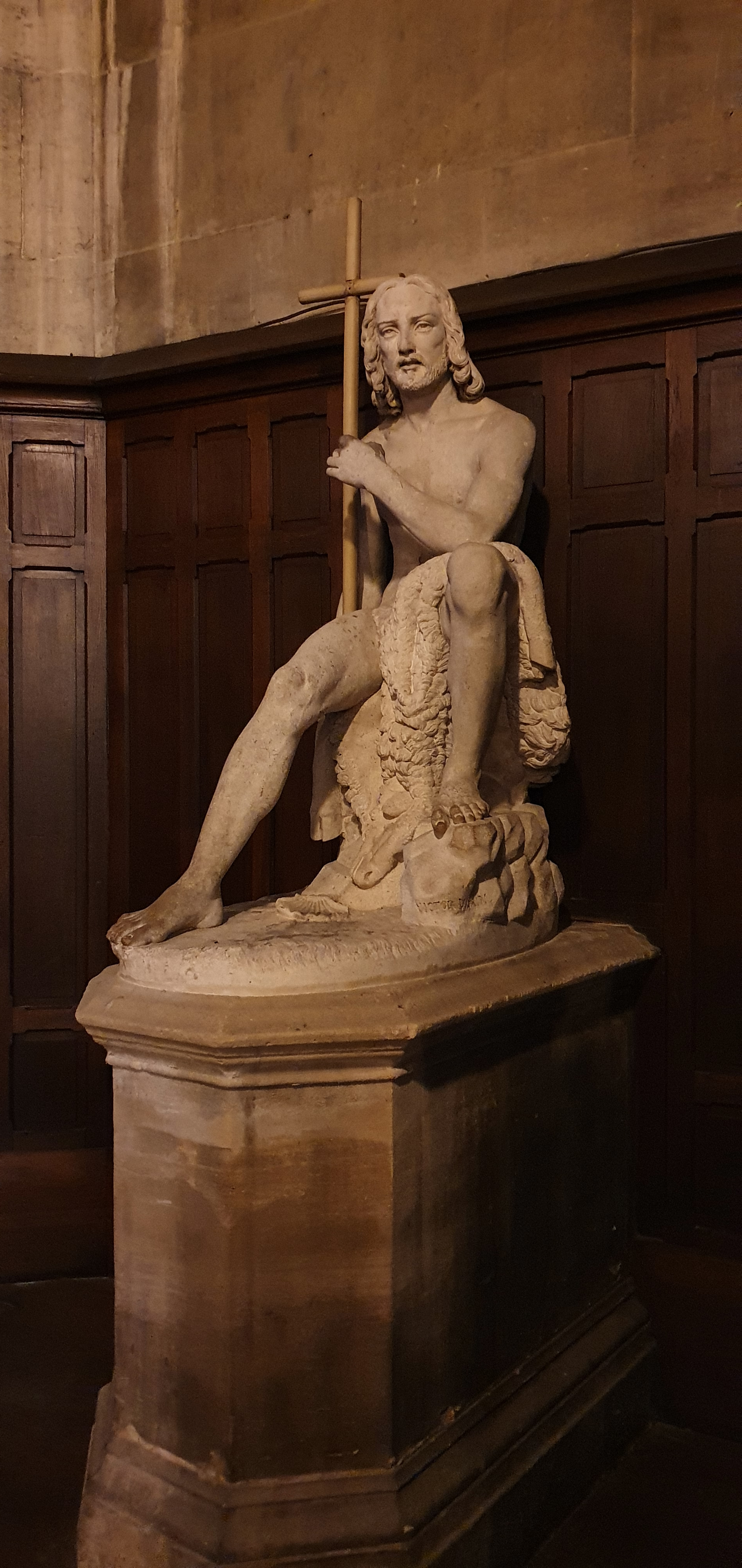
Saint John the Baptist by Victor Villain (1845)

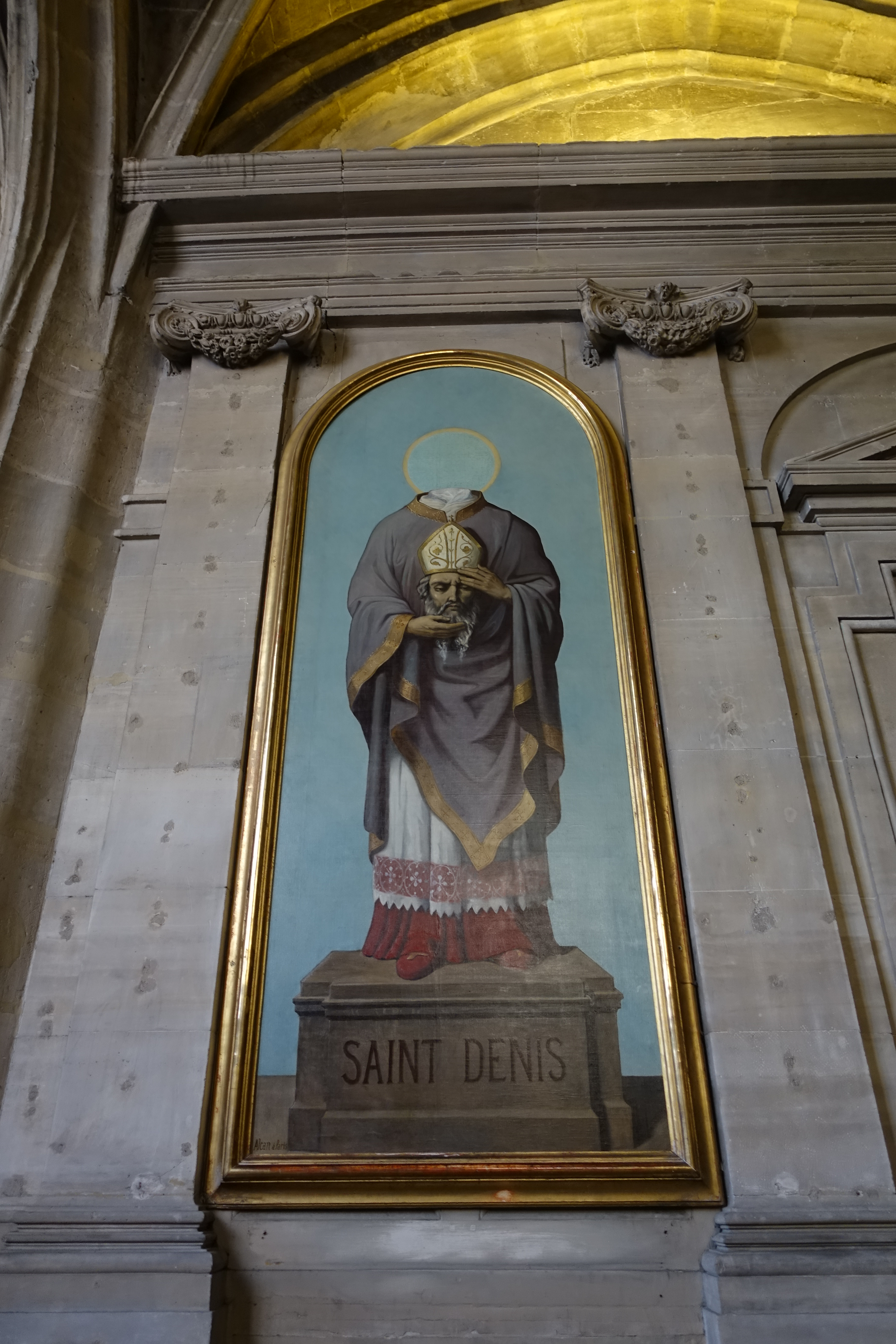
Portrait of Saint Denis, without his head

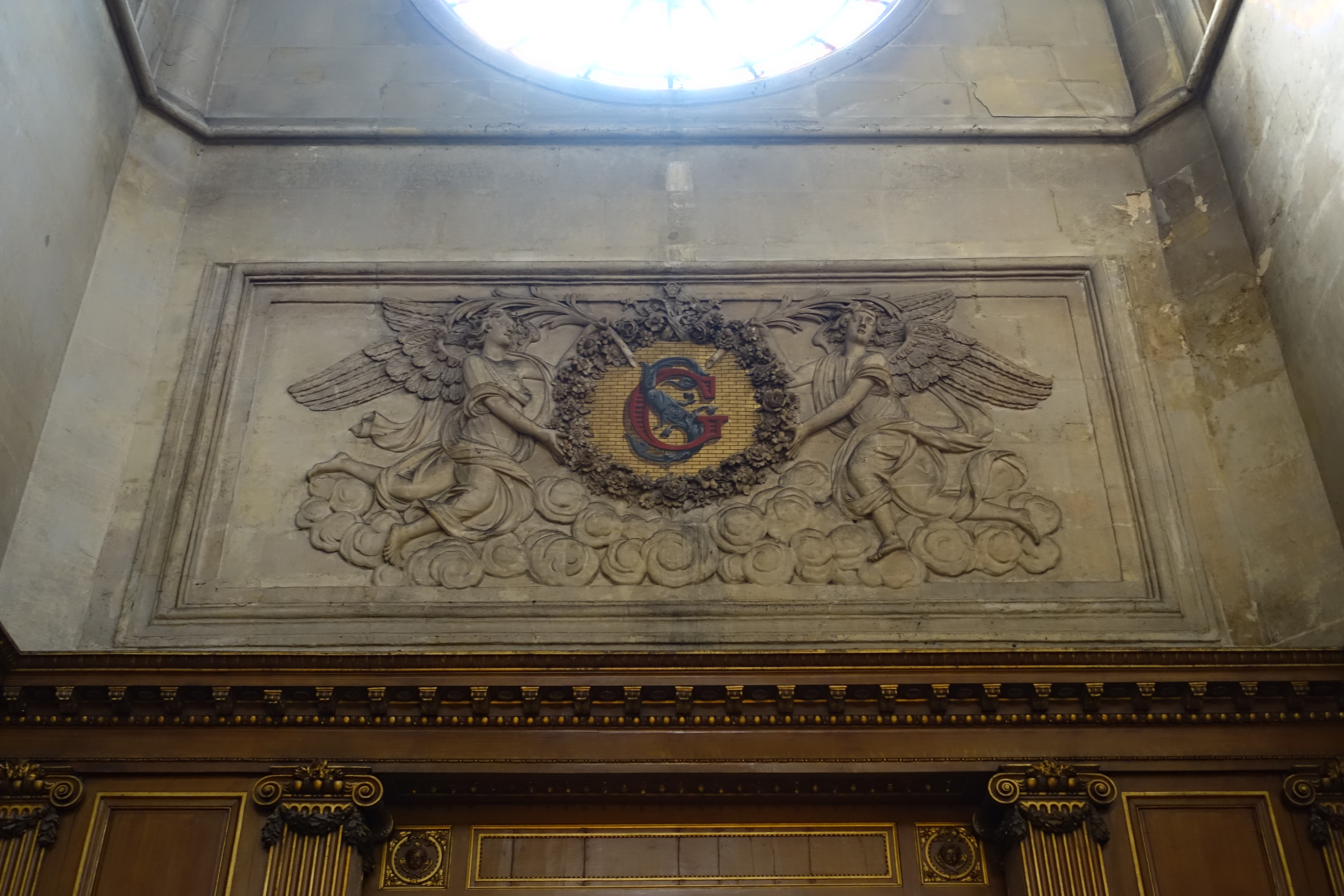
Stone carving below rose window in the transept

== Organs ==
The ornate carved wooden case of the grand organ, located in the tribune over the portal, was completed in 1684 and The organ itself was finished in 1686. It was built by Francois Du Castel and his son Hippolyte. It was modified between 1725 and 1732 by Nicolas Collar, then enlarged and extensively rebuilt in 1767 by Francois-Henri Clicquot. It underwent further reconstruction in 1864 and 1867 by Joseph Merklin. It was restored again in 1942. It was restored once more in 1993 by Jean Renaud. It was classified as an object of historical importance in 1945.

The current instrument has forty-two stops arranged on three keyboards. In addition to the grand organ, the church has a second, smaller organ located in the Choir.

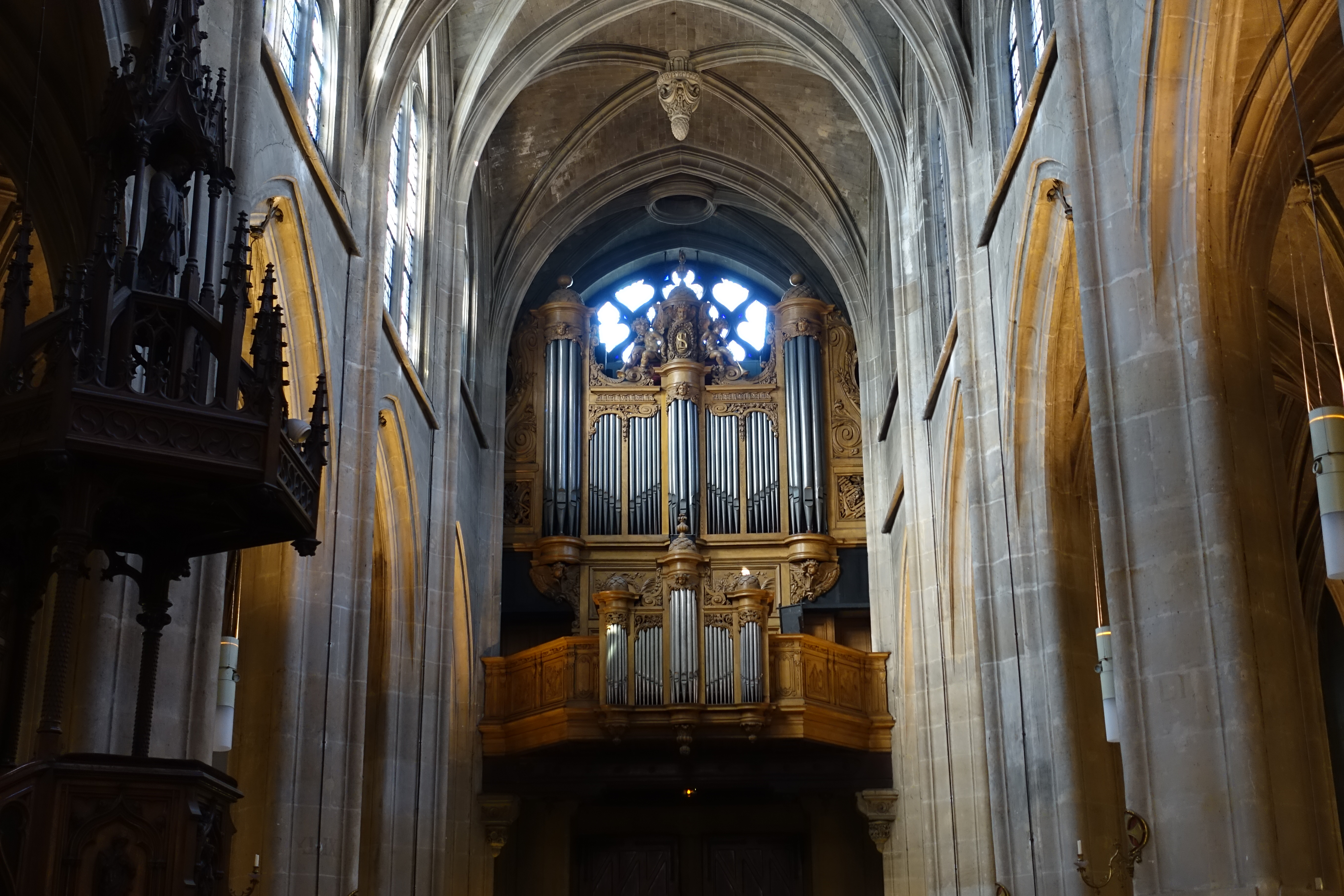
The organ and the tribune

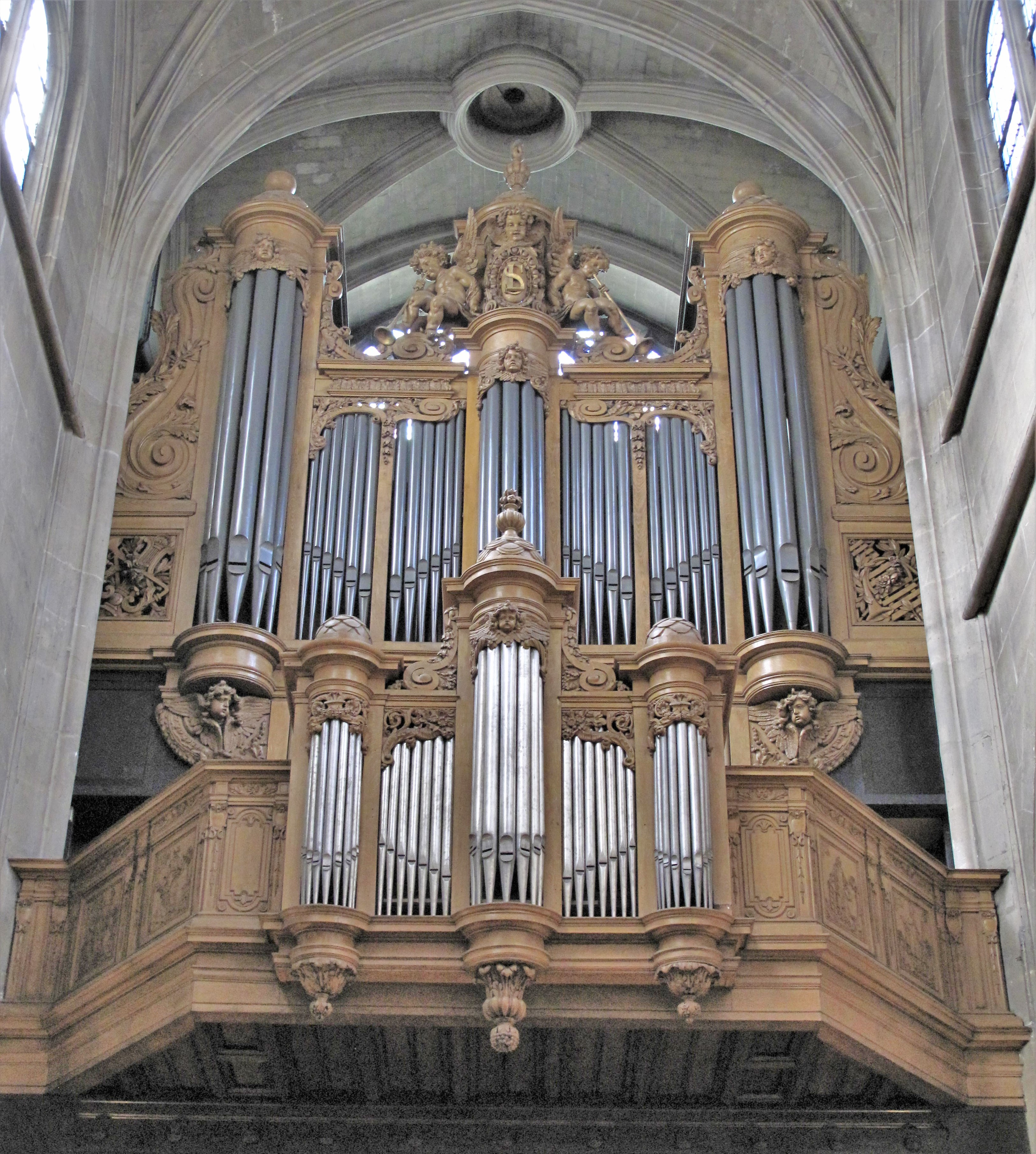
The Great Organ

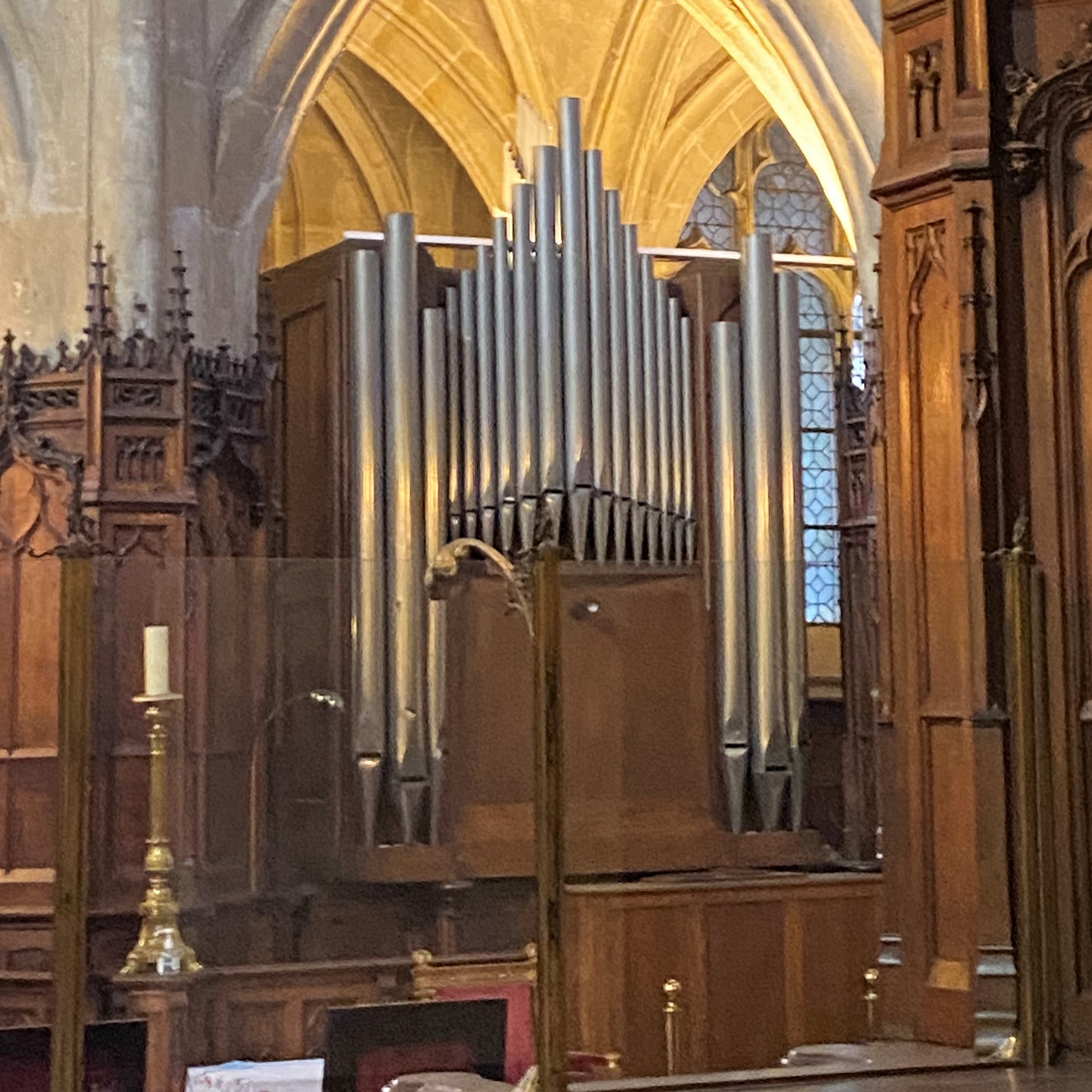
The Choir organ

== Sources and external links ==
- "Website of the parish (in French)".
