= Saint Elizabeth of Hungary Church, Paris =

Saint Elizabeth of Hungary Church
- Église Sainte-Élisabeth-de-Hongrie de Paris
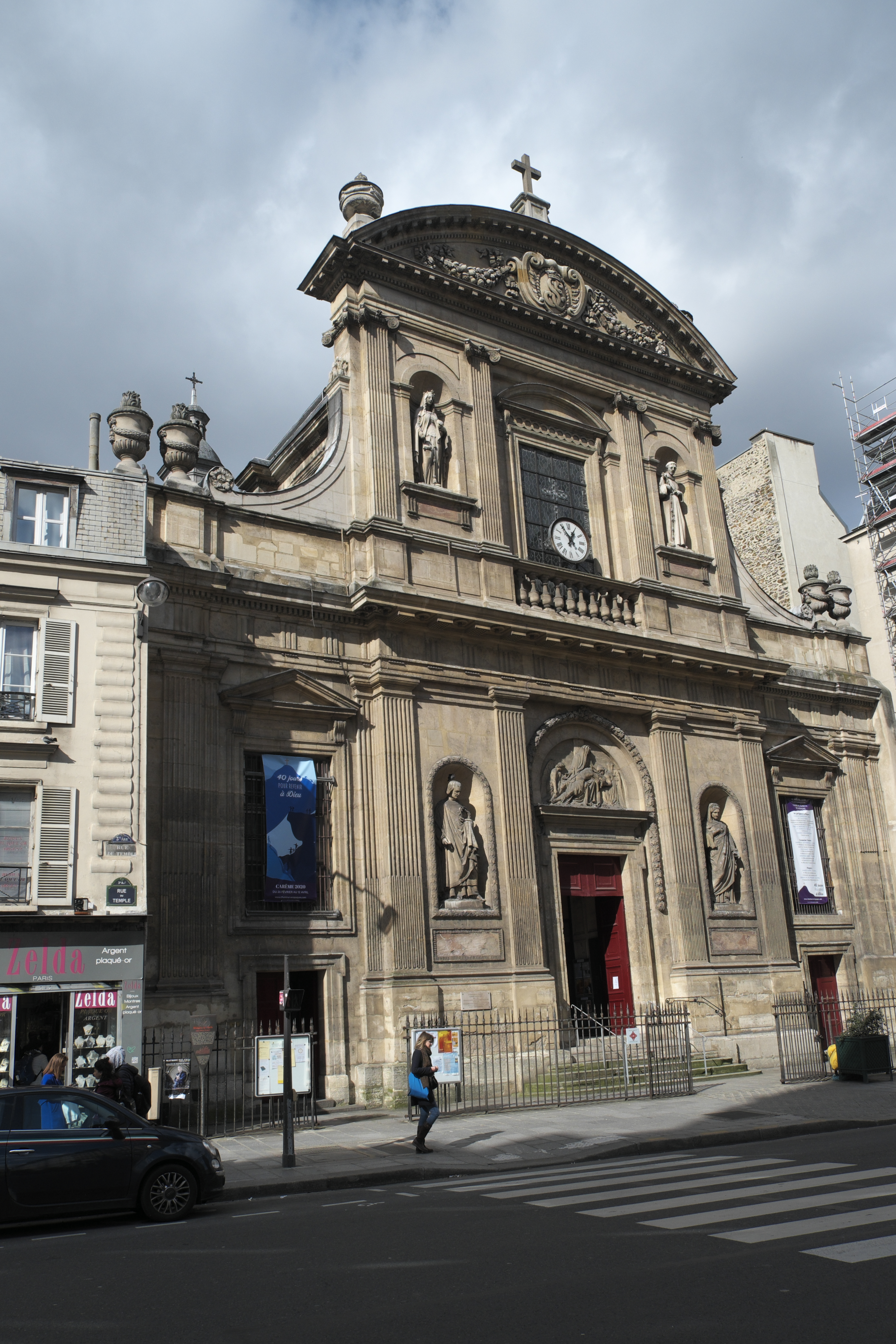
- The west front of the church
- Saint Elizabeth of Hungary Church
- 48.8661°N 2.3606°E
- Country: France
- Denomination: Roman Catholic
- Website: sainteelisabethdehongrie.fr (In French)

History
- Founded: 1626
- Consecrated: 1646

Architecture
- Heritage designation: Monument historique
- Style: Neoclassical architecture
- Groundbreaking: 1626
- Completed: 1857

Administration
- Archdiocese: Paris

Saint Elizabeth of Hungary Church (French: Église Sainte-Élisabeth-de-Hongrie de Paris) is a Roman Catholic church located at 195 rue du Temple, near Place de la Republique in the 3rd arrondissement of Paris, France. It is named for Saint Elizabeth of Hungary, a Princess of Hungary in the 13th century who became known as a symbol of Christian charity.

The first stone of the church was laid by Marie de Medicis in 1628. The facade was inspired by the Church of the Gesù in Rome and the Jesuit style, while the later architecture drew upon the Beaux-Arts architecture and neoclassicism. It has been registered as a historic monument of France since 1937.

== History ==
The church was originally built as a chapel for the Dames of Saint Elizabeth, part of Third Order of Saint Francis, of which Saint Elizabeth of Hungary had been an early member, but only the nave and the left aisle were finished by 1645. The church was consecrated in 1646 by the future cardinal of Retz, and dedicated to Notre-Dame of Pity and Saint Elizabeth of Hungary.

During the French Revolution, the church was closed and turned into a storage barn for fodder. It was returned to the church in 1797. The earlier parish church for the Temple neighbourhood, Saint-Marie-du-Temple, had been destroyed during the Revolution, and following the Restoration Saint Elizabeth was designated to take its place. The building was enlarged and modified by architect Étienne-Hippolyte Godde (1781-1869), Architect of the City of Paris from 1813 to 1830. Godde designed some thirty religious buildings in Paris. He designed a new choir, and added a disambulatory and two large chapels on the left lower side. His modifications doubled the size of the church. He also added an axial chapel dedicated to the Virgin Mary, but that chapel was demolished in 1858 to make room for the new rue de Turbigo constructed by Napoleon III and Baron Haussmann.

In 1938, the church became the convent church of the Knights of the Order of Saint John of Jerusalem, known as the Knights of Malta because of their ruling of that island from 1530 to 1798.

== Exterior ==
The facade of the church was inspired by the Church of the Gesù, the influential church of the Jesuits in Rome. Several other Paris churches of the period used the same design. It features pilasters, sculpture in niches, and other classical elements. The apse was a later addition; the original apse had to be shortened to allow the passage of a new street, Rue Turbigo, built by Napoleon III.

The sculpture in the tympanum over the portal, depicting Christ taken down from the cross, was made by the Italian sculptor Joseph-Michel-Ange Pollet (1814-1870). Statues in niches depict King Louis IX (Saint Louis) (left) and Saint Elizabeth of Hungary.

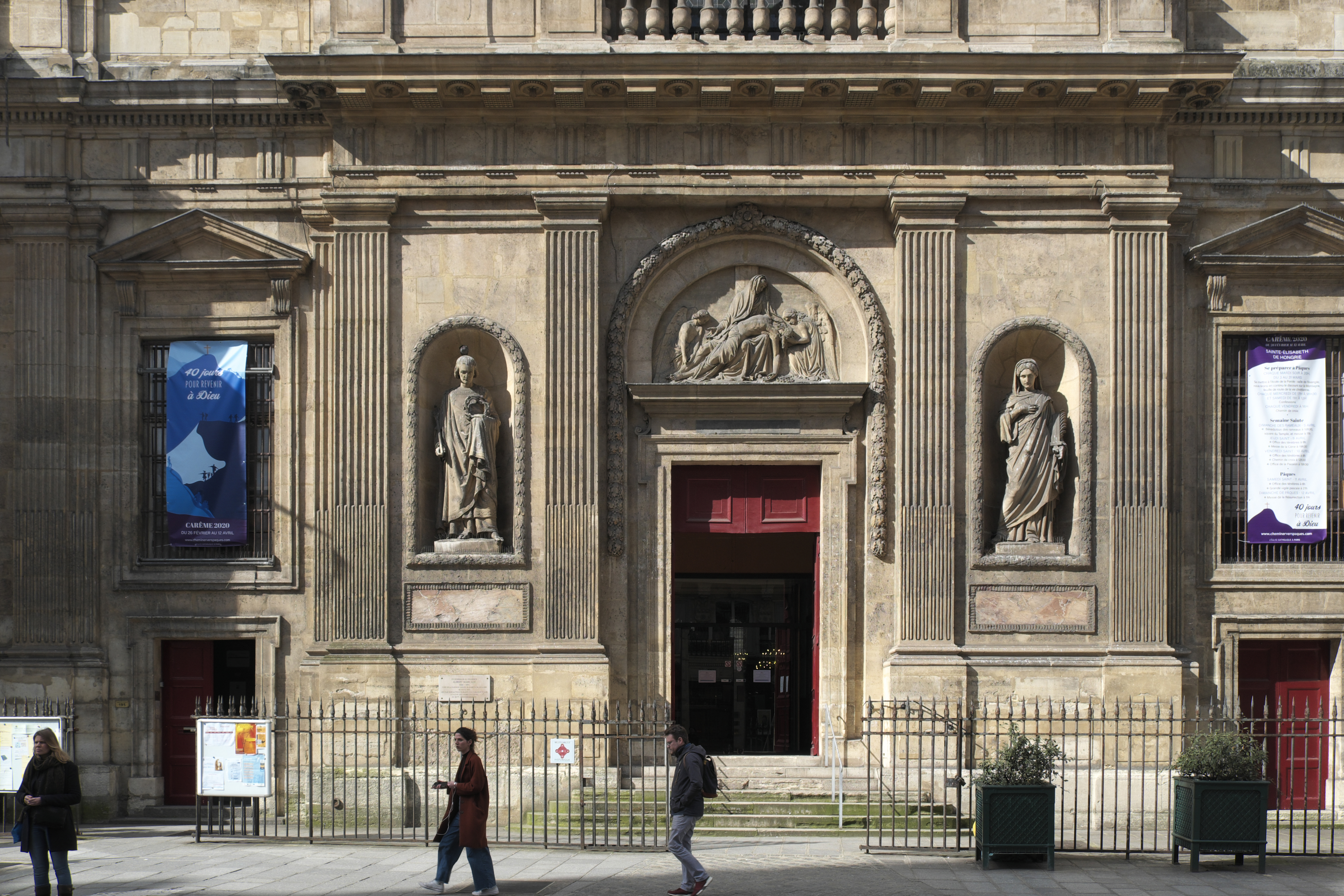
Portal with pilasters and sculpture. The left statue is Louis IX (Saint Louis) and the right statue depicts Saint Elizabeth of Hungary

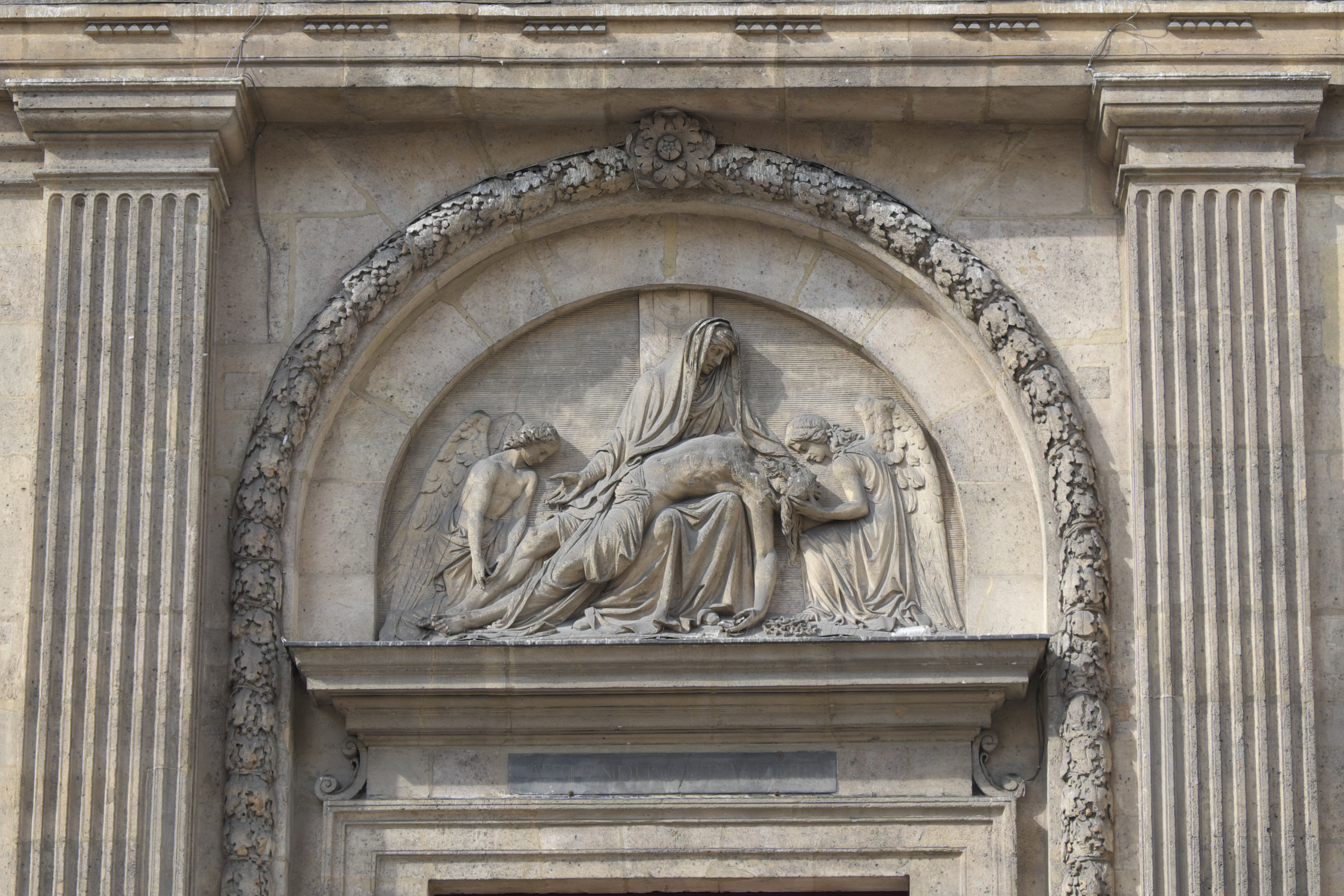
Tympanum with a sculpture of Christ taken down from the Cross made by Joseph-Michel-Ange Pollet (1814-1870).

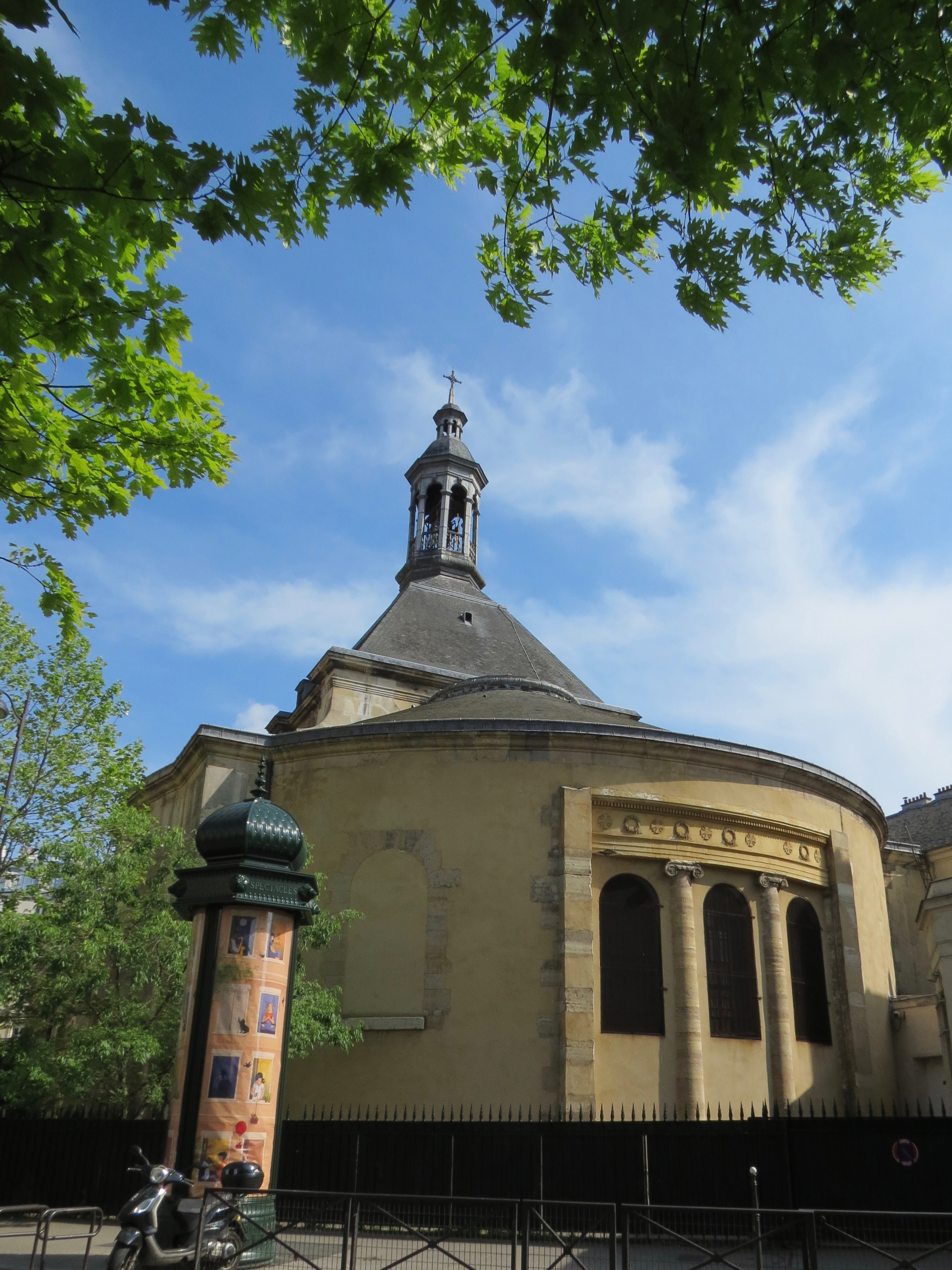
The 19th-century apse seen from Rue de Turbigo

== Interior ==
=== The Choir and Nave ===
The choir of the church was rebuilt in the early 19th century, following the restoration of monarchy, by the architect Étienne-Hippolyte Godde. The decoration includes large frescoes on the walls and a half-dome with colorful frescoes in the interior. and other frescoes in the disambulatory around the choir.

The fresco in the half-dome depicts "The Glorification of Saint Elizabeth of Hungary welcomed by the angles into heaven", made by Jean Alaux (1786-1864). In the fresco, Saint Elizabeth wears the habit of a Franciscan. She is welcomed by figures of the three theological virtues (Faith, Hope and Charity} and by the archangels Saint Michael and Saint Gabriel.

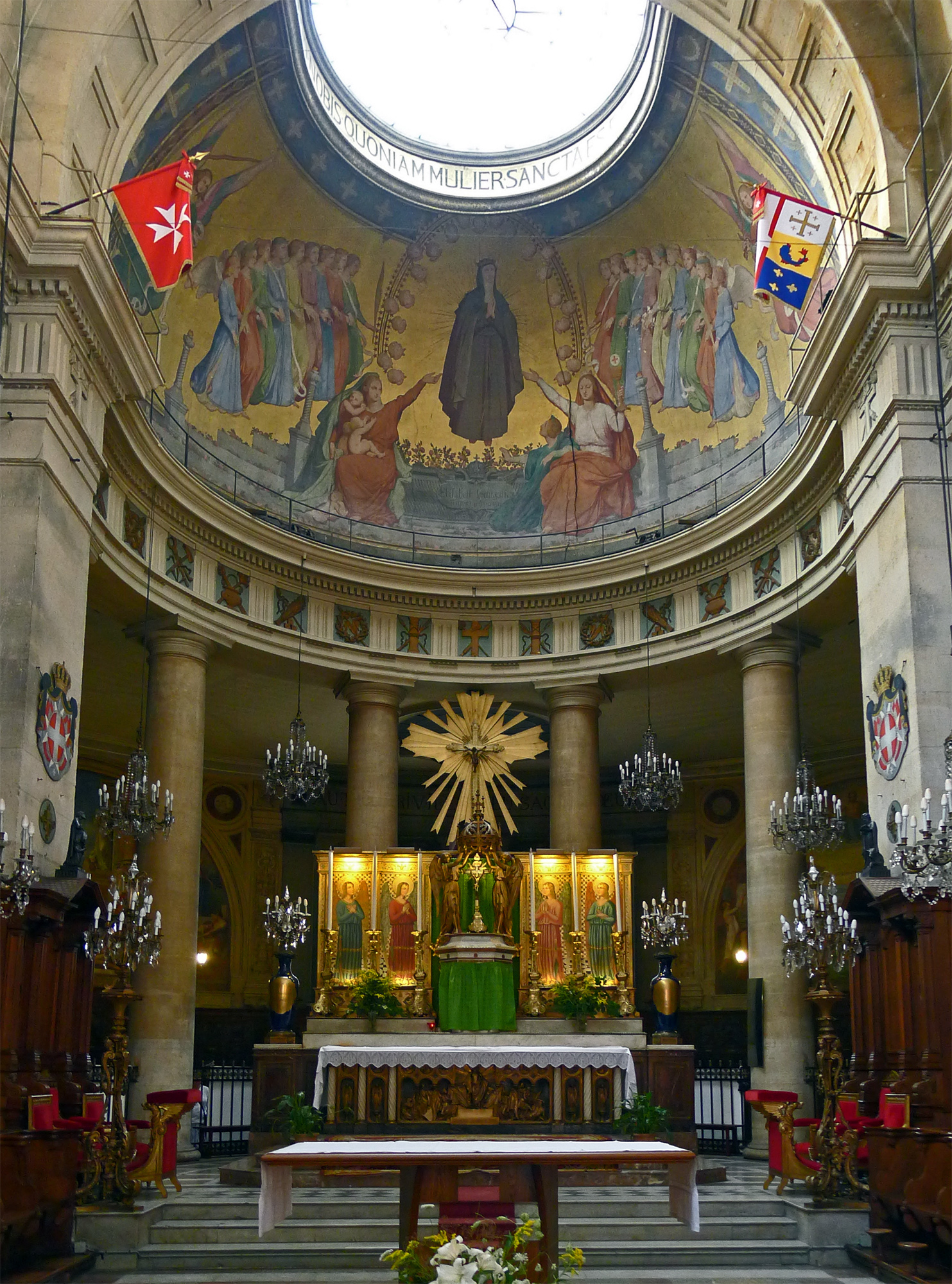
Altar and Choir of the church

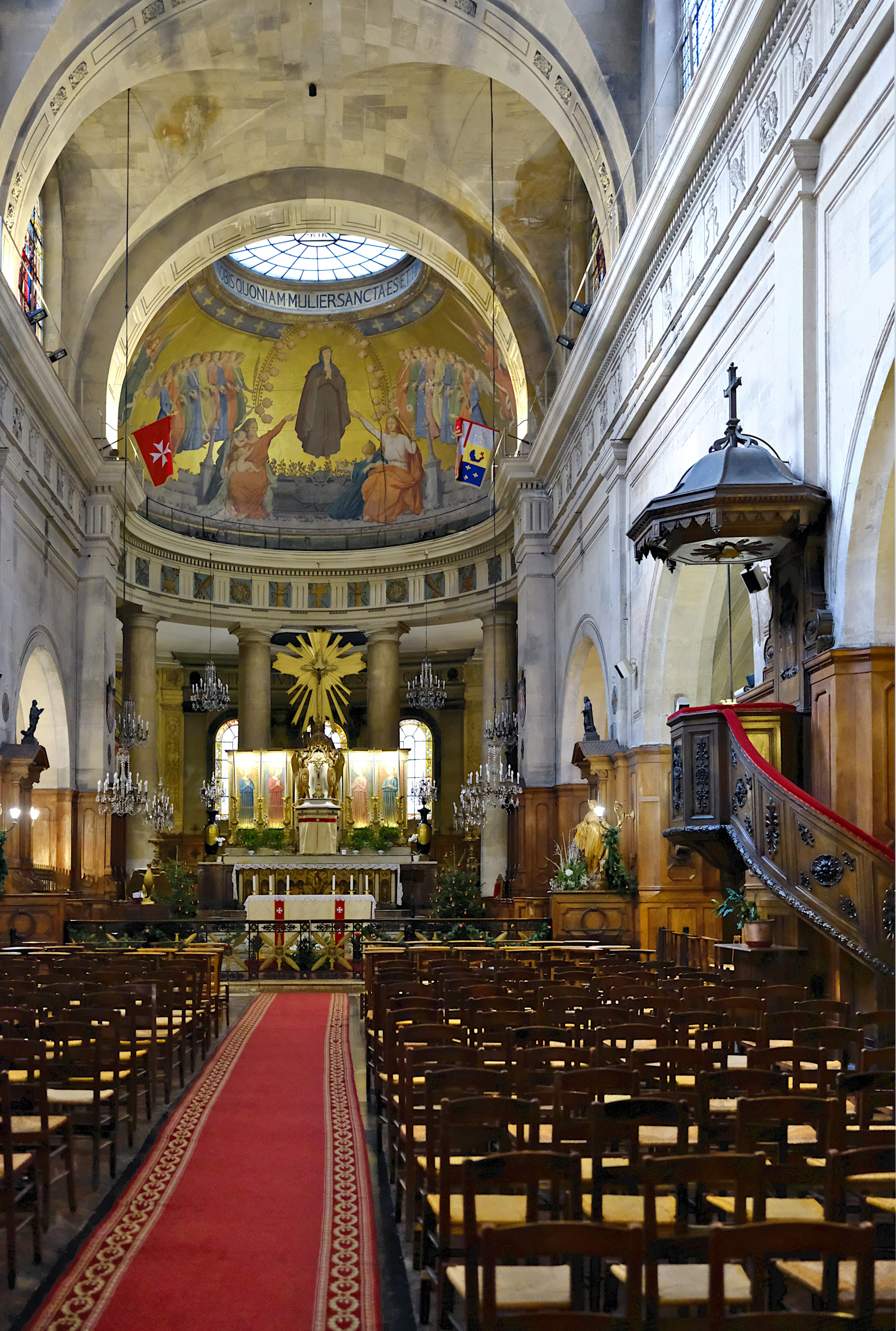
Nave

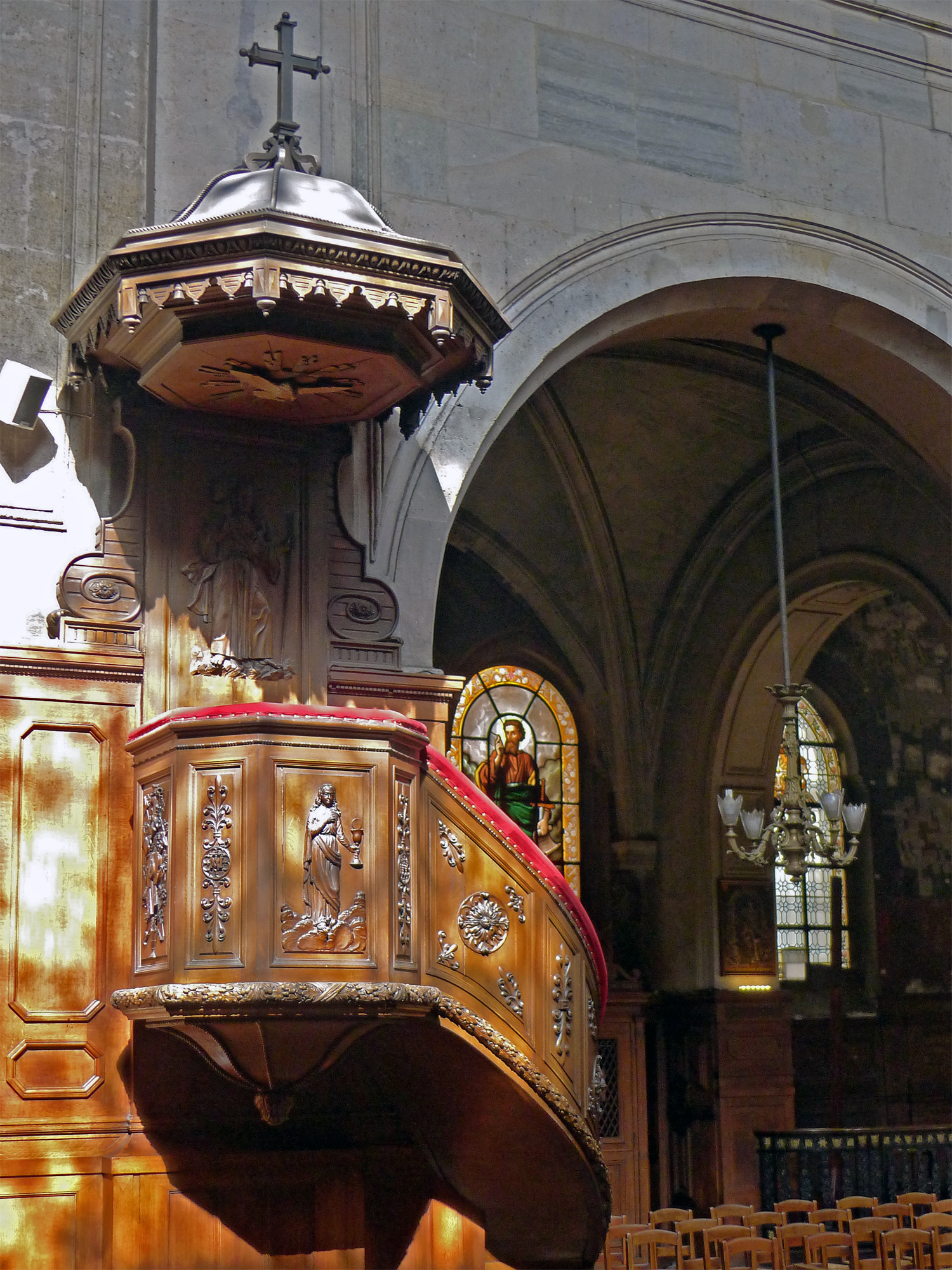
The pulpit in the nave

=== Side Aisles and Disabulatory ===
The Disambulatory behind the choir is decorated with one hundred elaborate carved wooden sculptures, which were made in the 17th century to decorate the choir stalls of the Abbey of Saint-Vaast in Arras, which was destroyed during the Revolution. They depict scenes from the Old Testament and the New Testament, and reflect the theological reforms established by the Council of Trent as of 1623. doctrines They were discovered by the architect Victor Baltard and moved to the church in 1845. They include Christ on the Cross, with the Virgin Mary and Saint John, A Tripique made in the 17th century in the style of Louis XIII. The disambulatory also displays a series of four frescoes made in the mid-19th century; "The Beatitudes" by Guermann Von Bohn; "The Seven Sacraments" by Paul Jourdy; "The Last Judgement" by Adolph Roger; and "Seven Works of the Les Béatitudes (de Guermann Von Bohn).

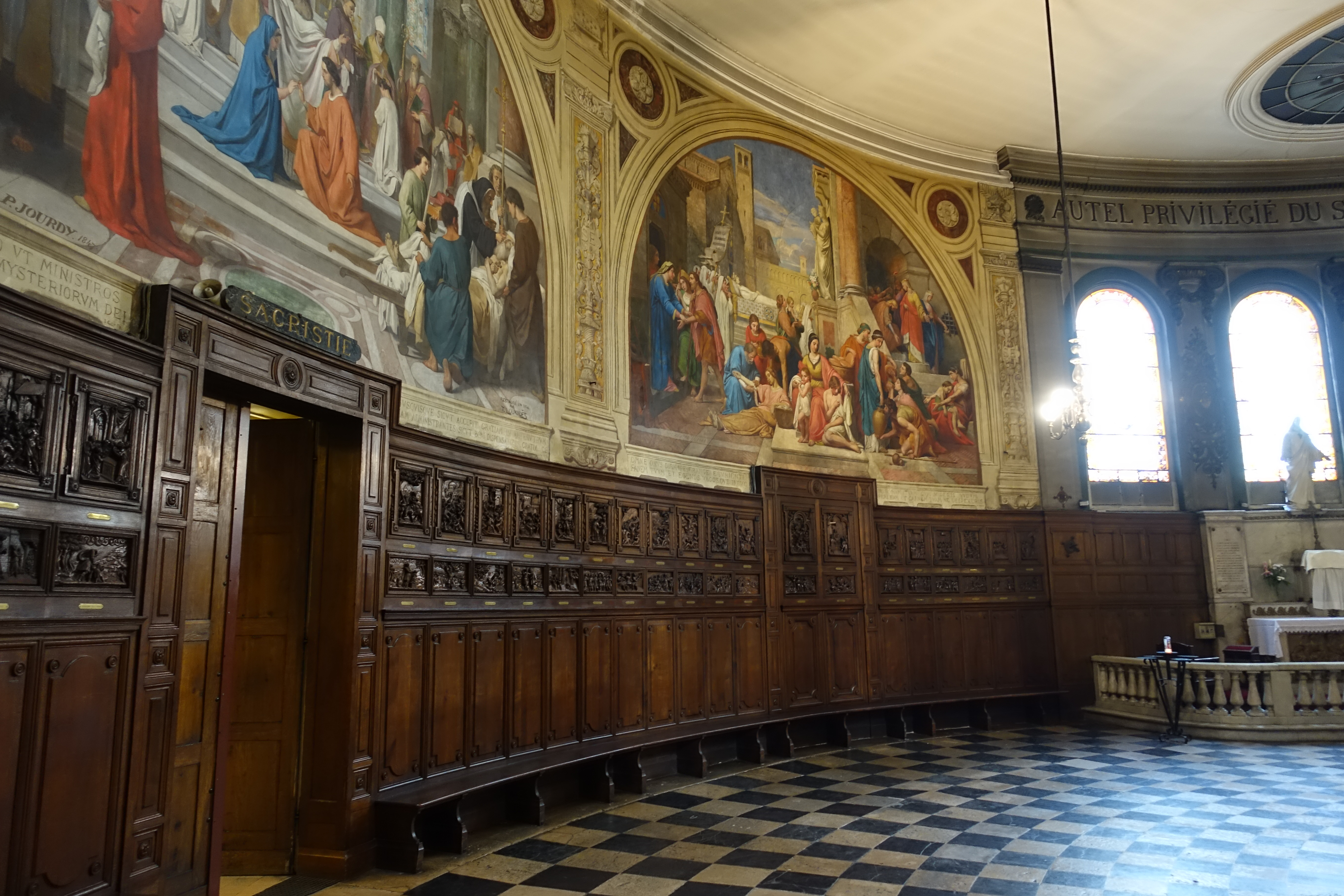
Disambulatory with wood carvings from stalls of St. Vaste Abbey (17th c.)

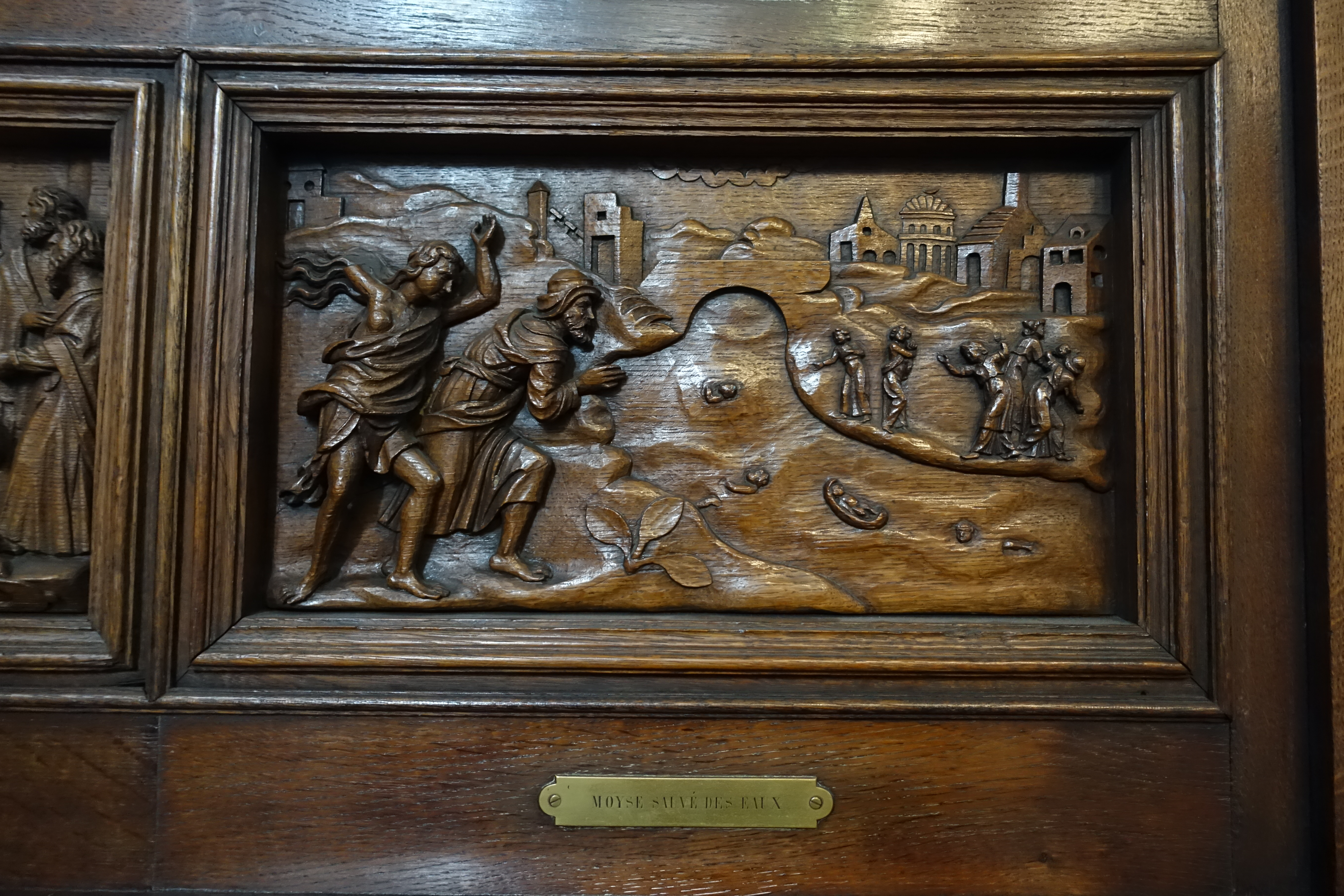
Detail of 16th c. carving from Abbey of Saint Vaast; "Moses parts the waters"

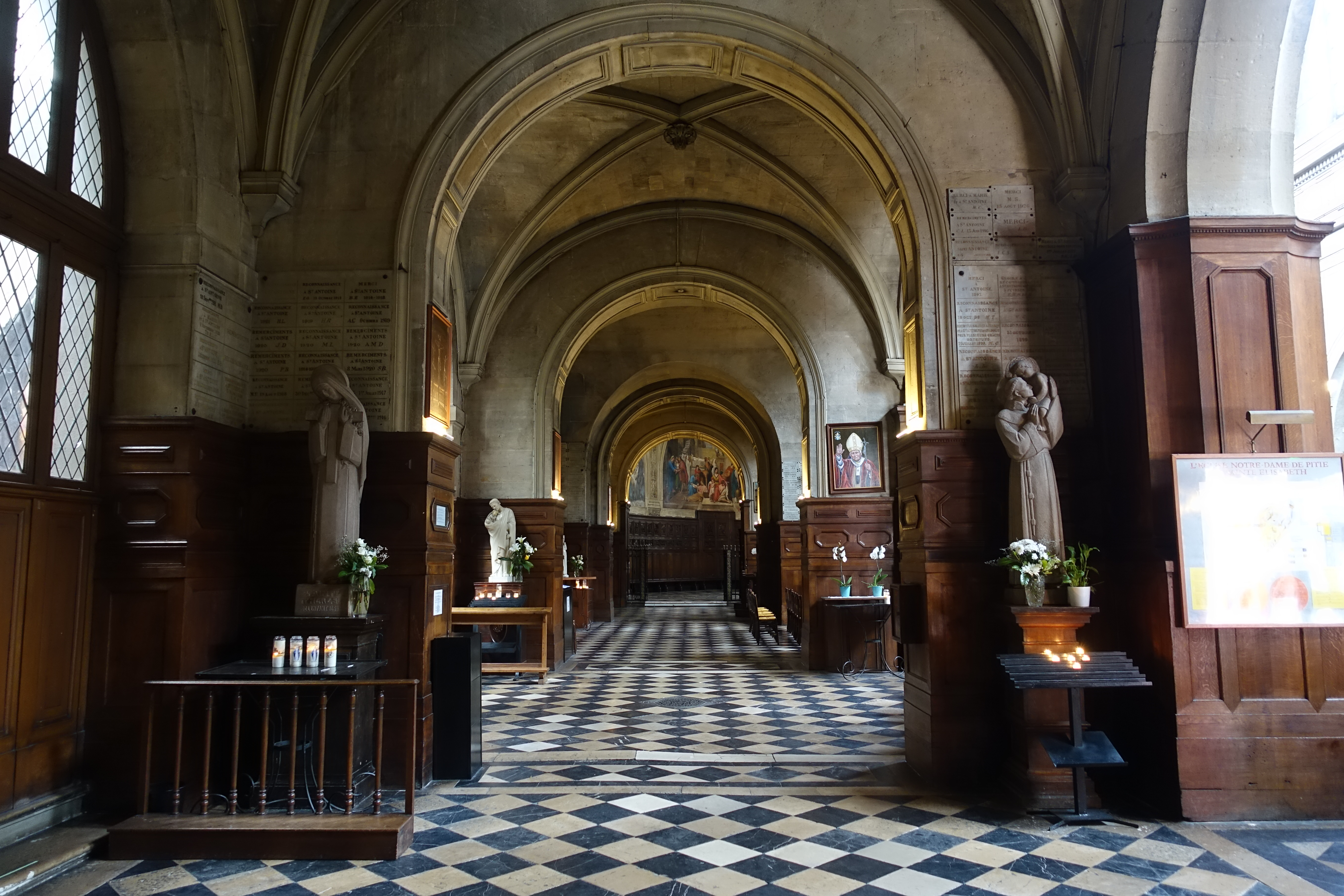
Left side aisle

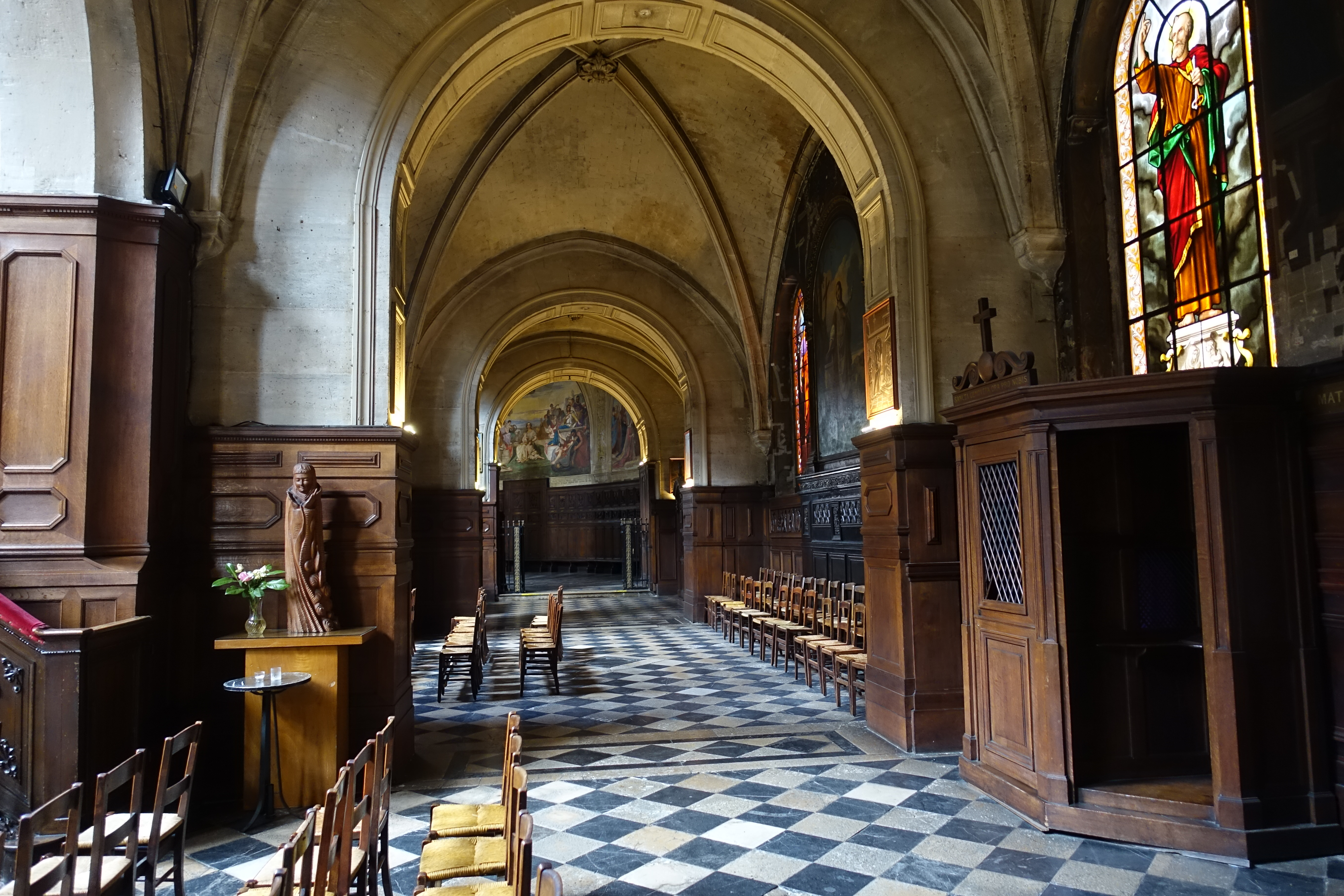
Right Side aisle

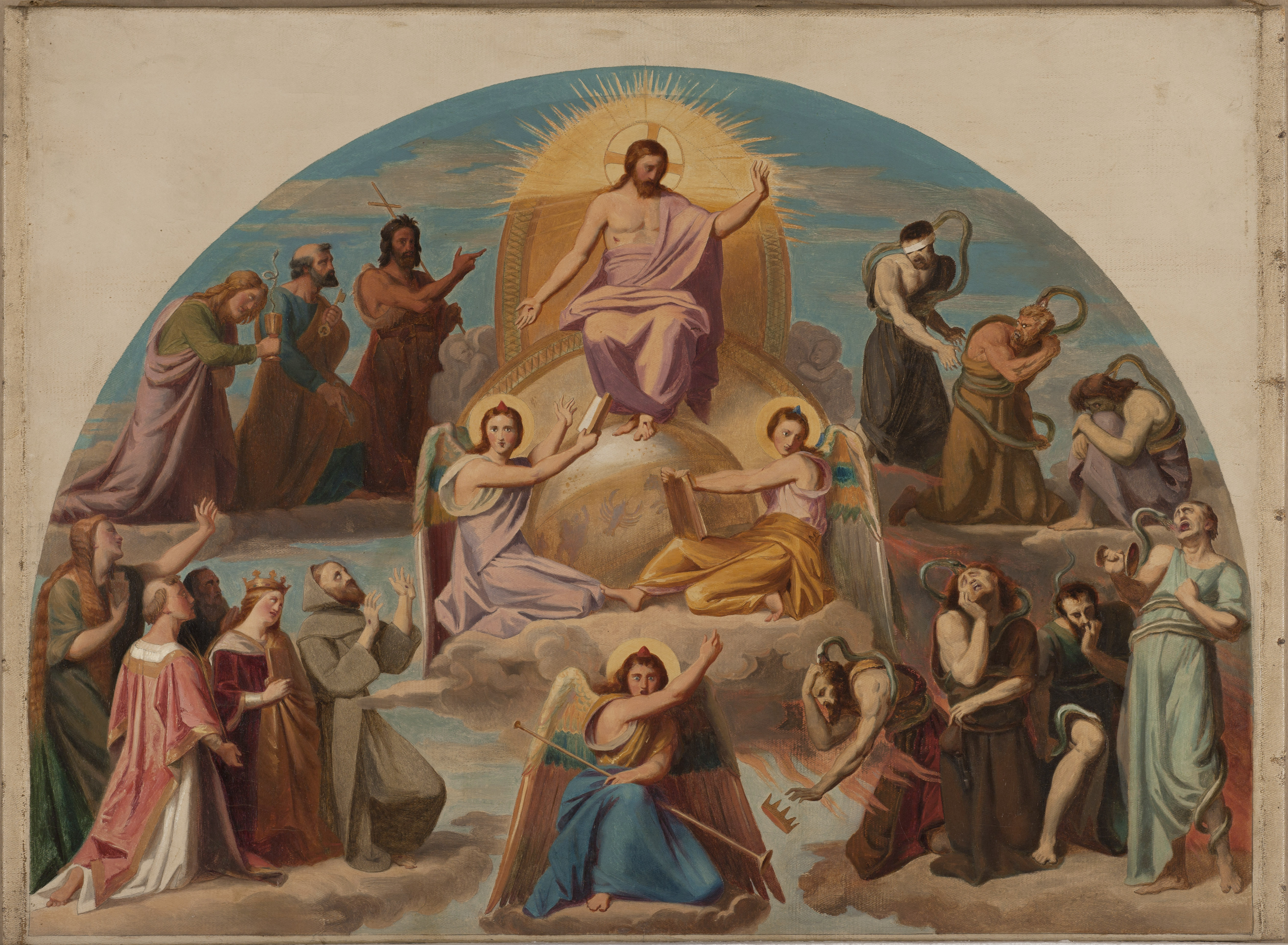
Sketch for "The Last Judgement", by Adolphe Roger, a fresco in the disabulatory.

=== Chapel of the Virgin ===
The centrepiece of the Chapel of the Virgin is a large painting, "Elisabeth placing her crown at the foot of the image of Our Lord", by Merry-Joseph Blondel (1781-1853). The lower level of the altar in the Virgin chapel is decorated with several notable small portraits of saints by Abel de Pujol.

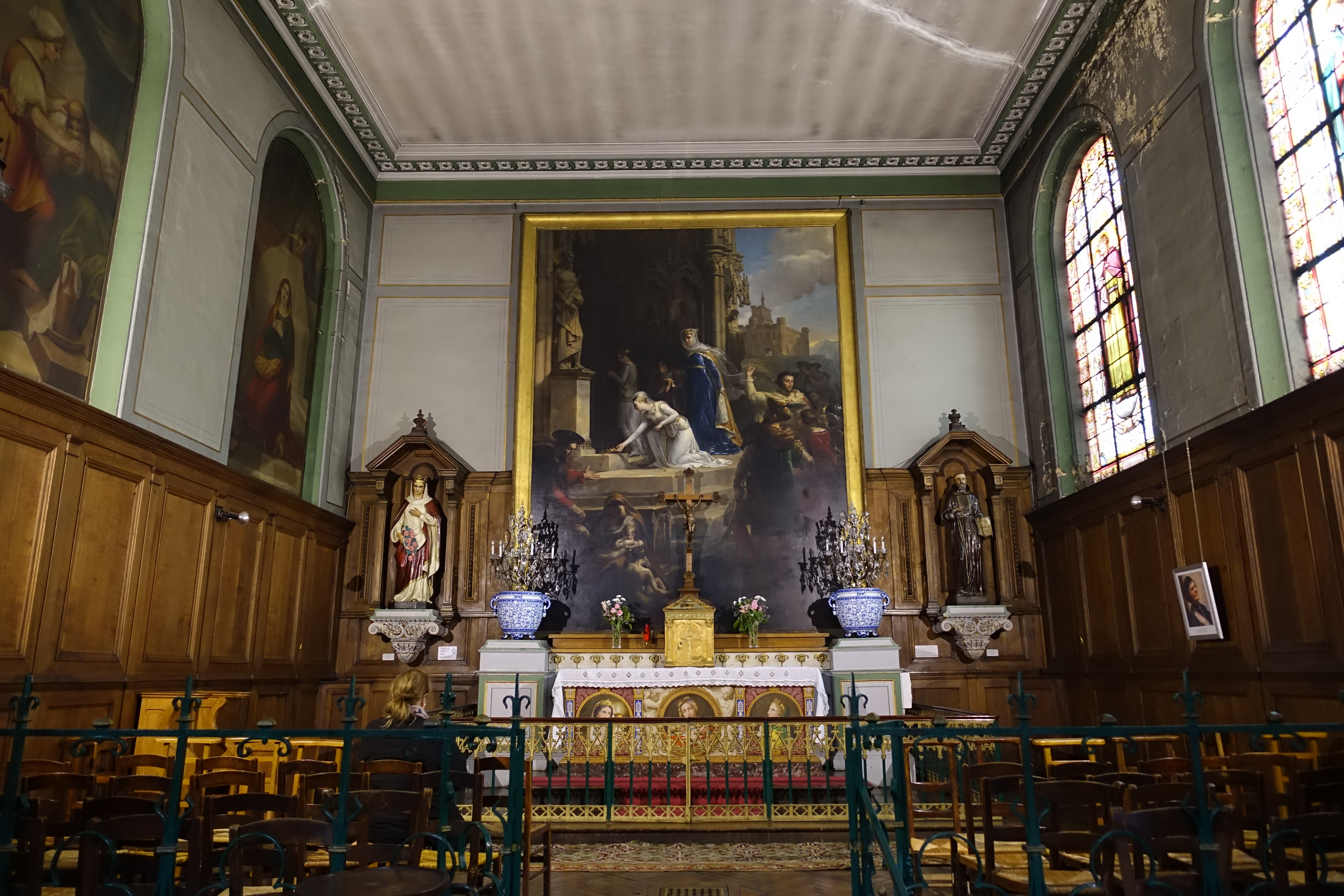
Chapel of the Virgin

=== Altar of the Sacred Heart ===
The Altar of the Sacred Heart is located in the left disambulaory, and is decorated with an elaborate altar and a statue of the Virgin Mary. The lower front of the altar is decorated with a bronze relief sculpture said to depict the death of Saint Elizabeth of Hungary.

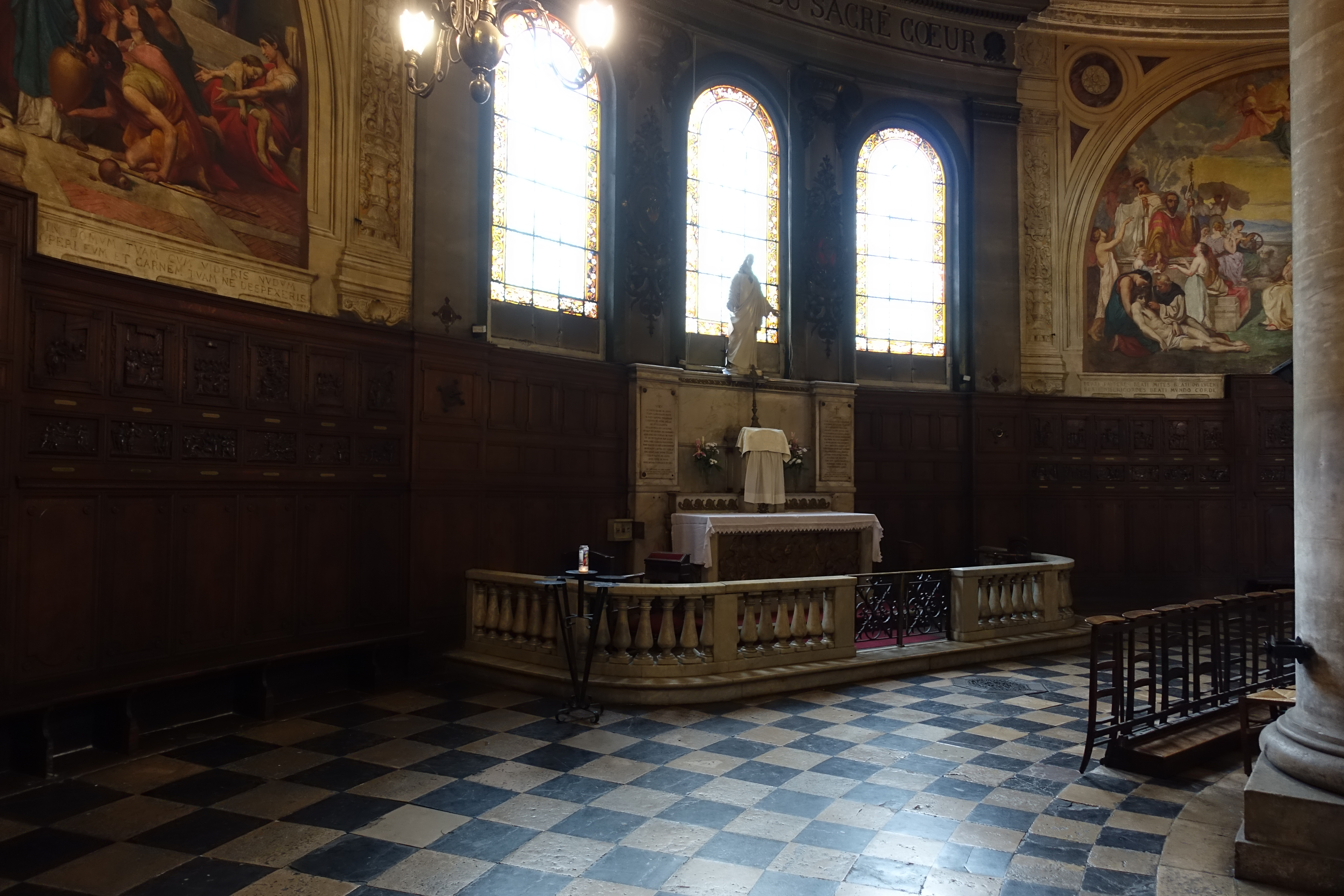
Altar of the Sacred Heart

== Art and Decoration ==
=== Stained glass ===
The church is particularly known for the quality of the stained glass, made in the 19th century. Several of the windows were made in England by the workshop of Warren-White and Edward Jones, beginning in 1829, based upon drawings made by Abel du Pujol. At this time Britain was a leader in the creation of windows made with enamel pigments, which were painted on the glass then fired to fuse them to the glass. Unlike the earlier Gothic windows, made with combinations of small pieces of coloured glass, this method allowed for more detailed pictures, with shading and perspective, which resembled paintings.

One group of windows, including a depiction of the canonisation of Saint Elizabeth of Hungary, was made from paintings of Abel de Pujol (1828), with the glass created by L. Lobin of Tours. This window was dated 1883. Several other windows followed until 1891.

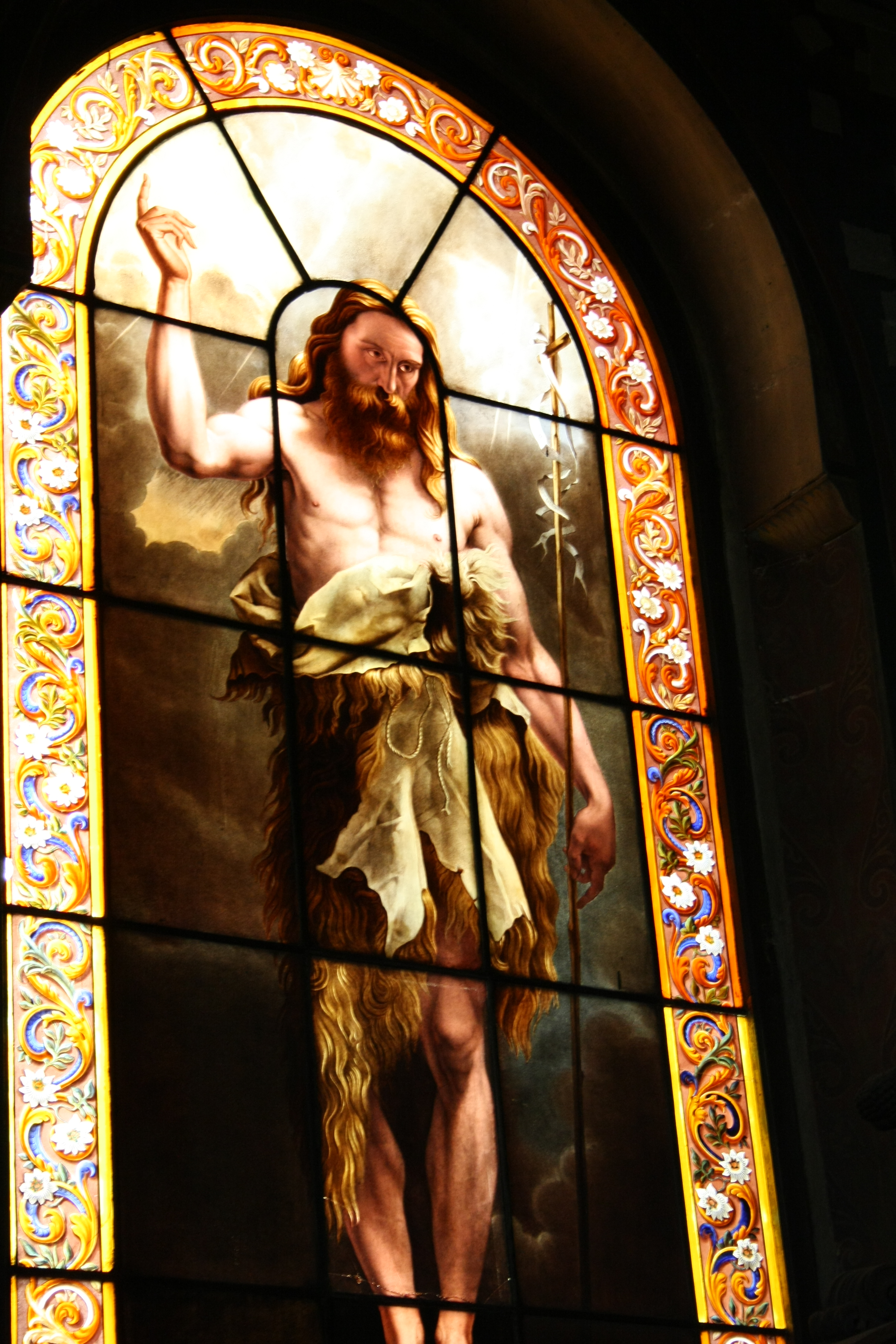
"John the Baptist" by Warren-White and Edward Jones (1829)

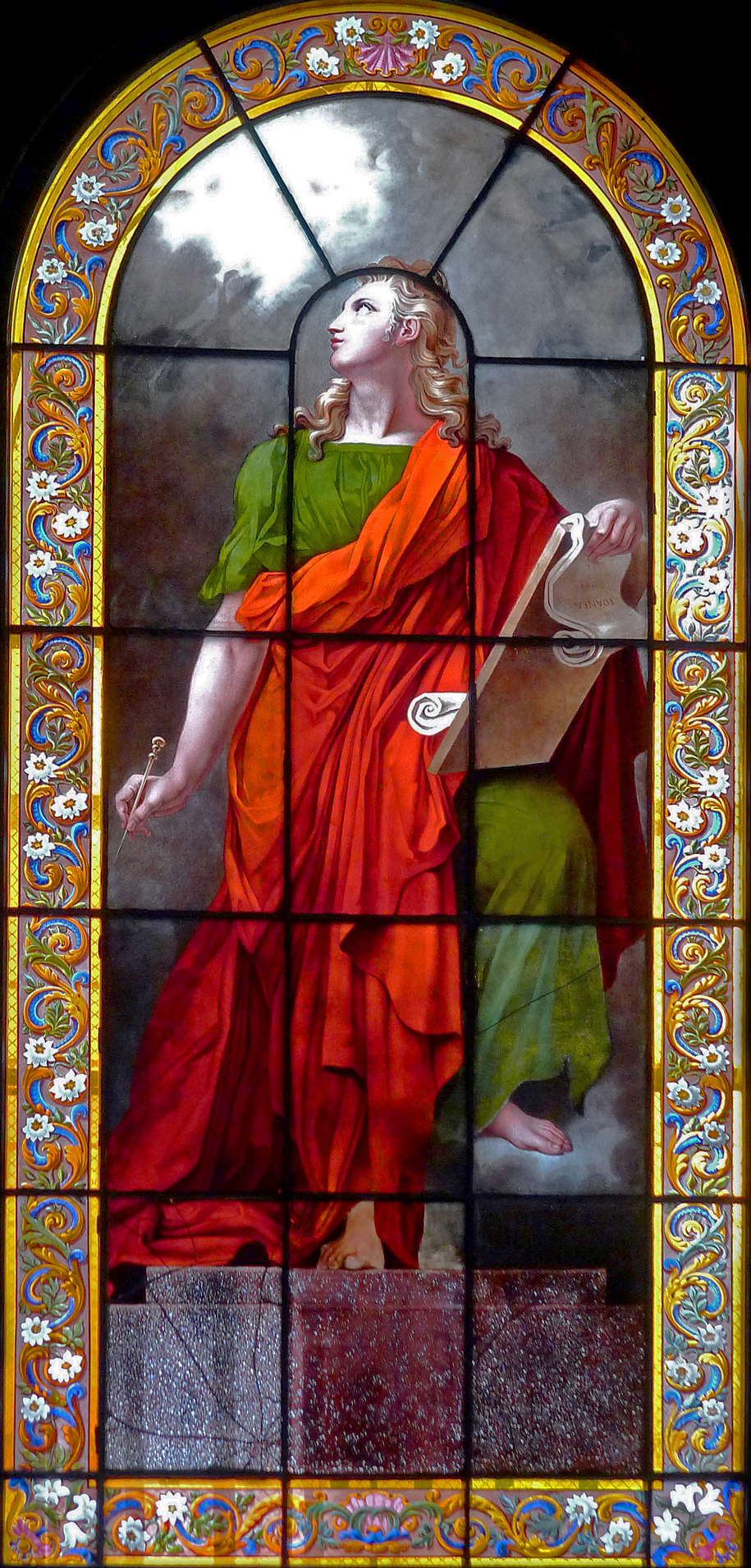
"Saint John the Evangelist". by Lobin workshop in Tours (1883)

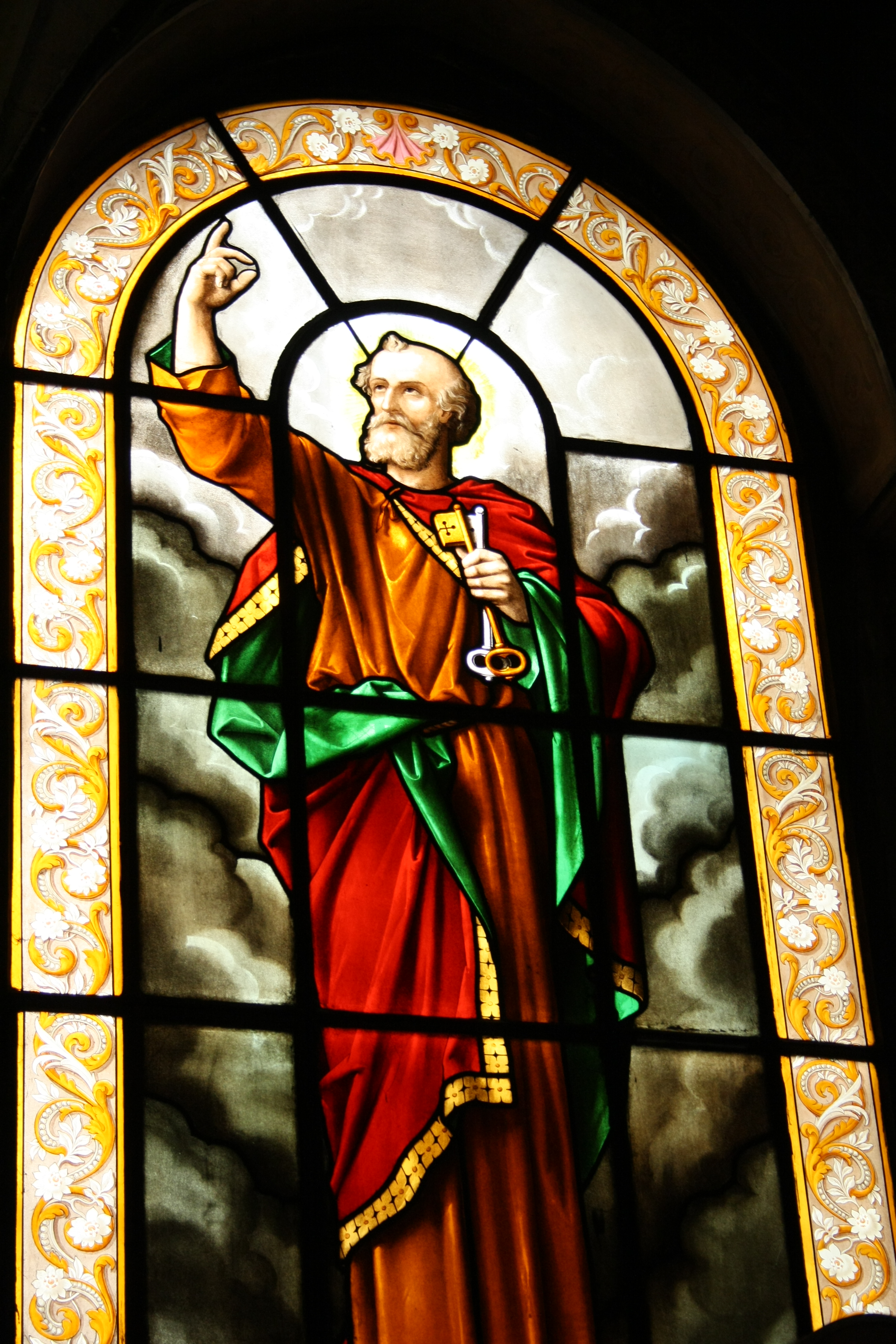
"Saint Peter"

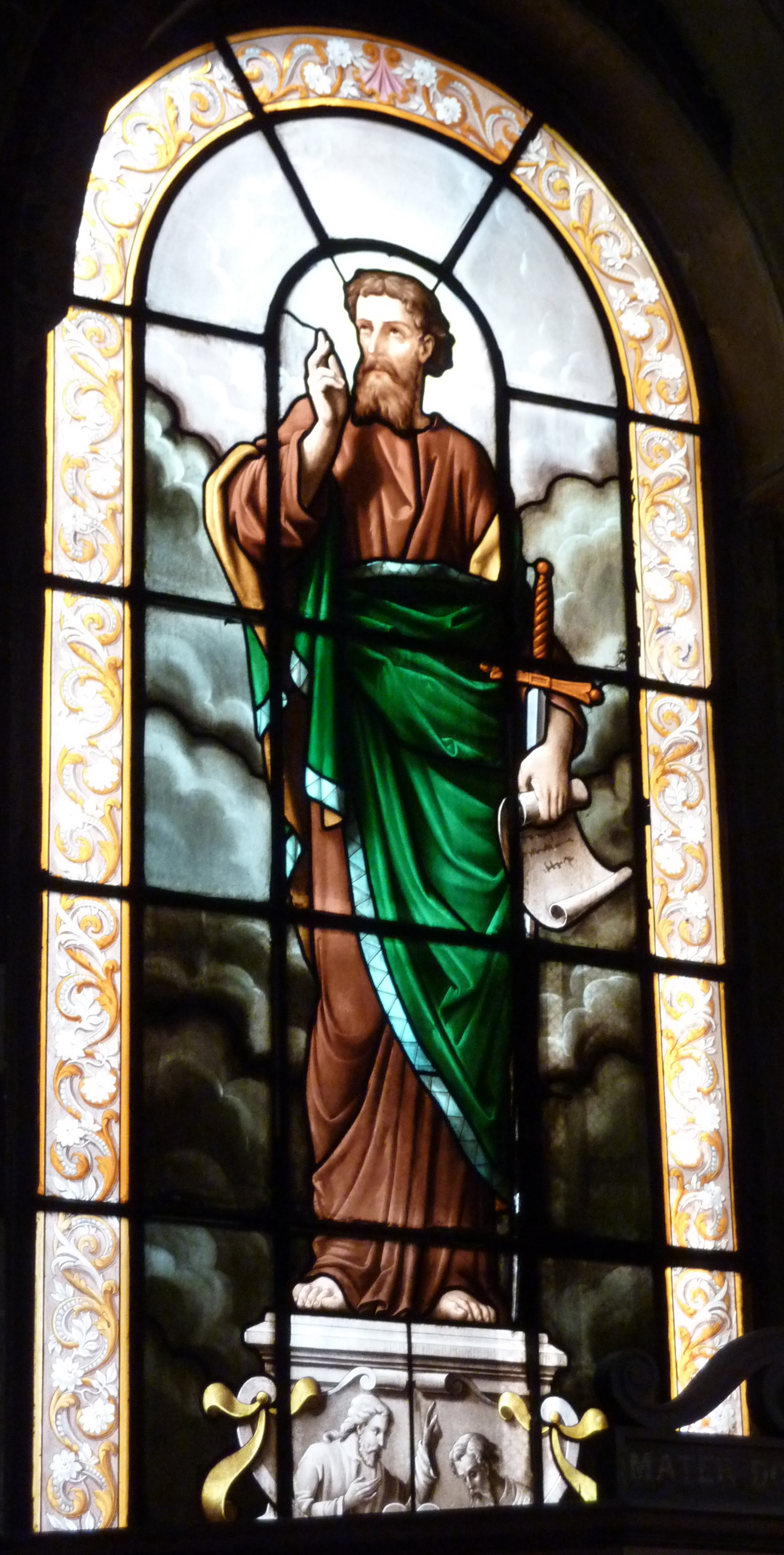
"Saint Paul"

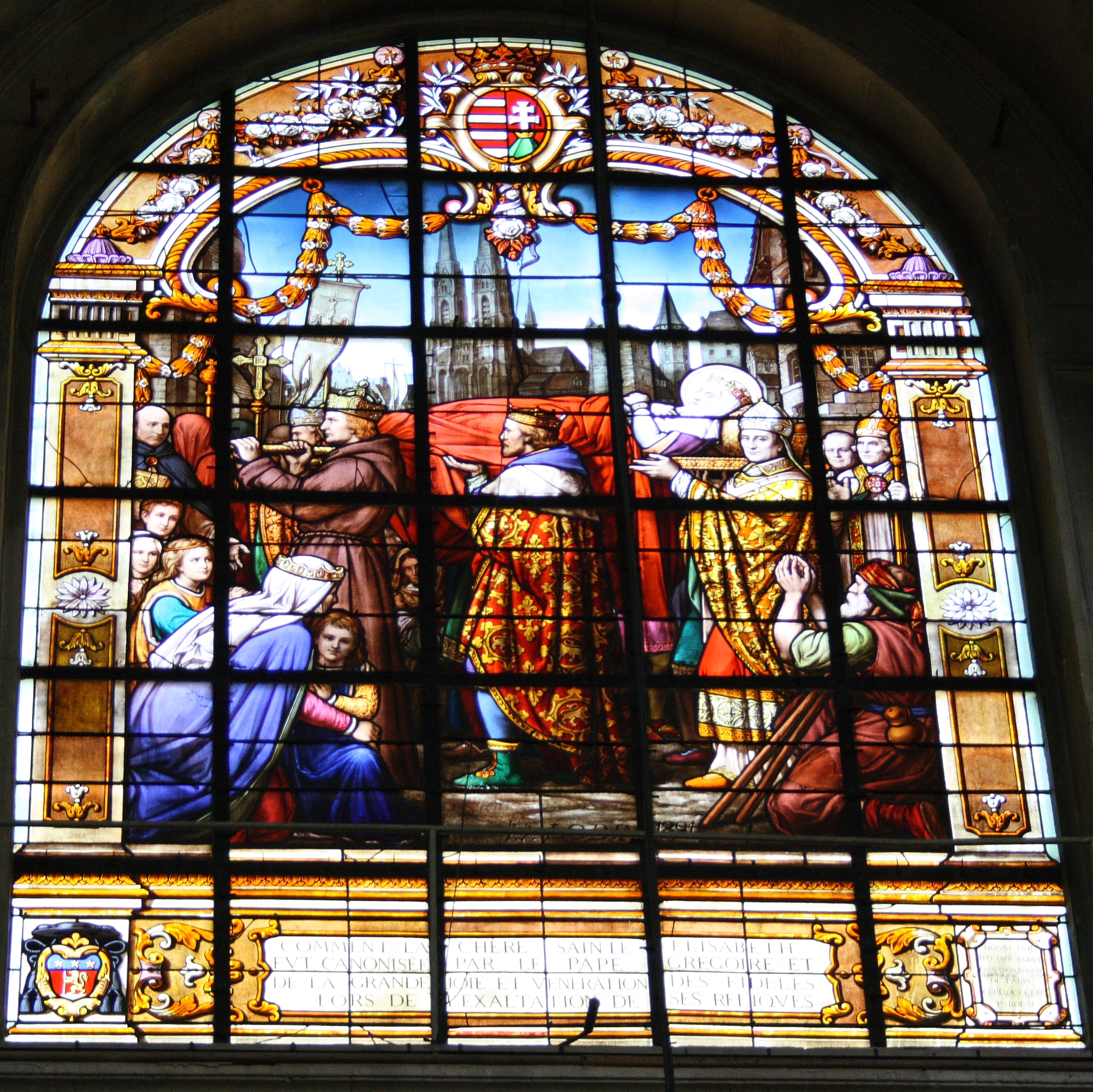
"The canonisation of Saint Elizabeth by Pope Gregory", the Lobin workshop (1891)
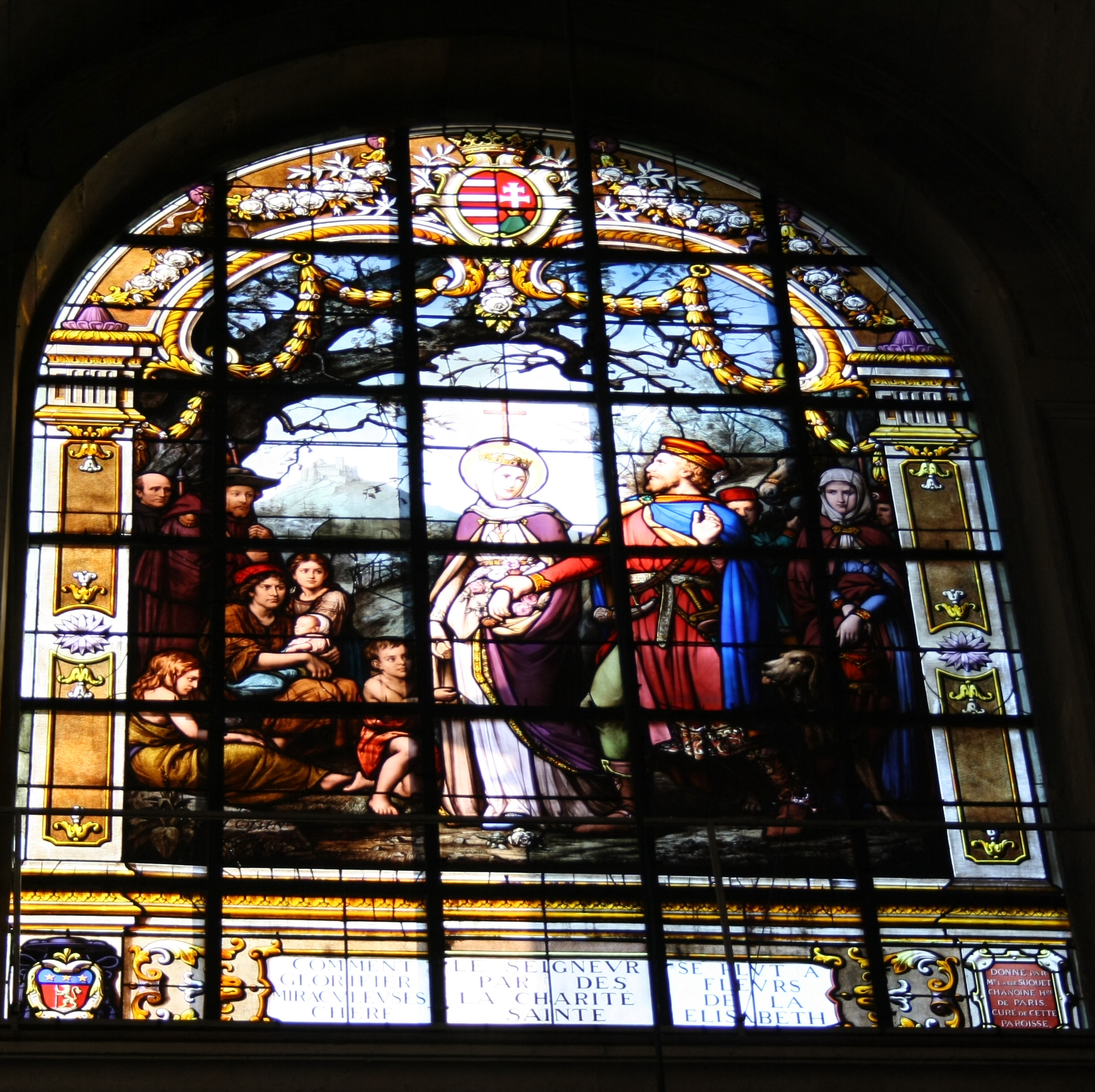
Saint Elizabeth of Hungary helping the poor

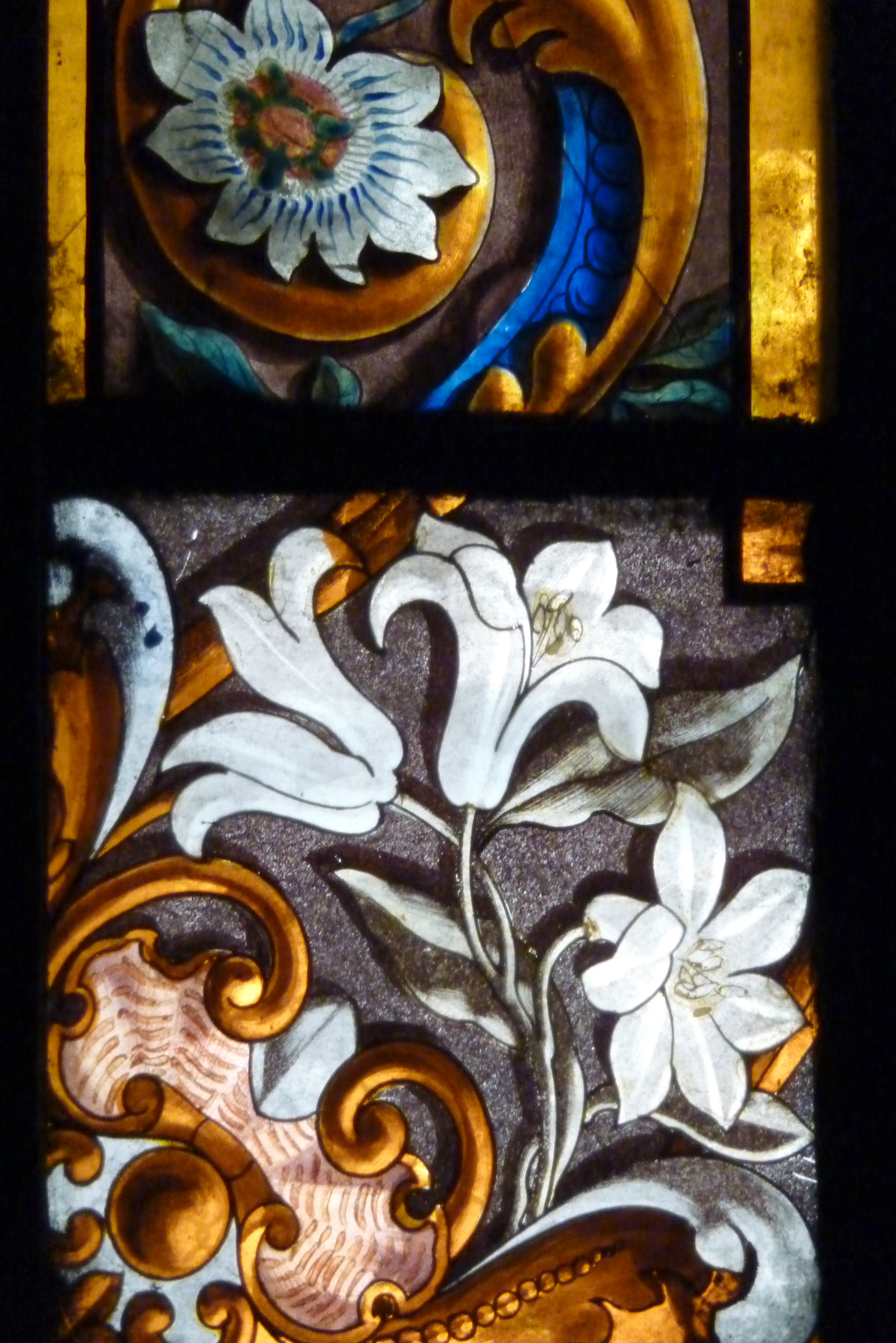
Decorative floral detail

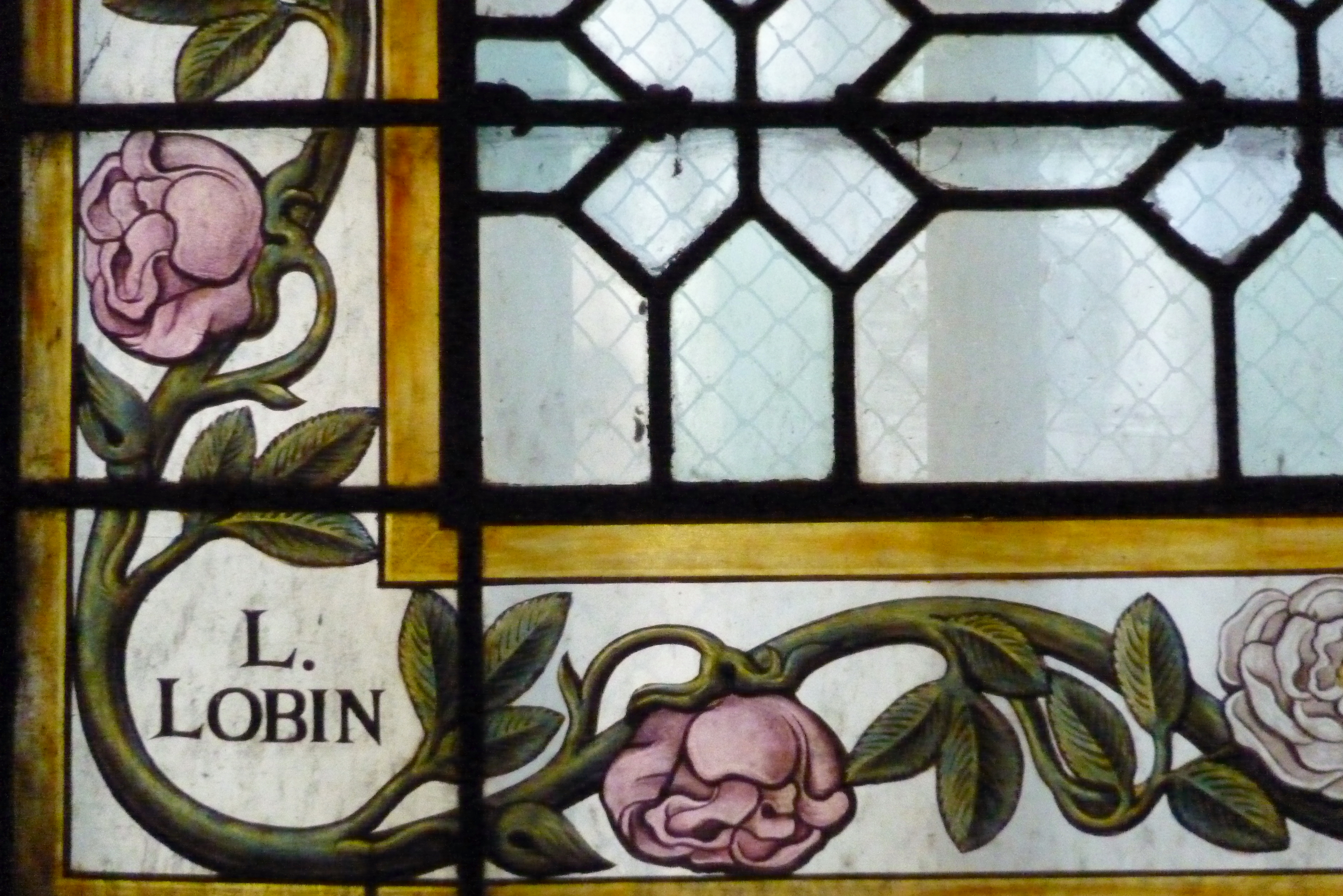
Signature of a window by L. Lobin of Tours (1891)

=== Painting and Sculpture ===
The church as an abundance of paintings and frescoes displayed in the nave, the side corridors, the chapels, and inside the half-dome. Most date to the second half of the 19th century. They were commissioned and paid for by the French government, the owner of the churches.

A series of four frescoes decorate the walls of the disambulator, painting directly onto the plaster walls. They date from the second half of the 19th century. They depict "The Seven Works of Misercordia" by Jean-Louis Bezard; "The Last Judgement" by Adolphe Roger; "The Last Judgement" by Adolphe Roger; and "The Seven Sacraments" by Paul Jourdy.

A pieta sculpture of Christ and the Virgin Mary, dating from the 17th century and coming from Troyes, is attributed to a prominent sculptor of the period, the Master of Chaource, but given stylistic differences with faces in other works of that sculptor, the attribution has been questioned.

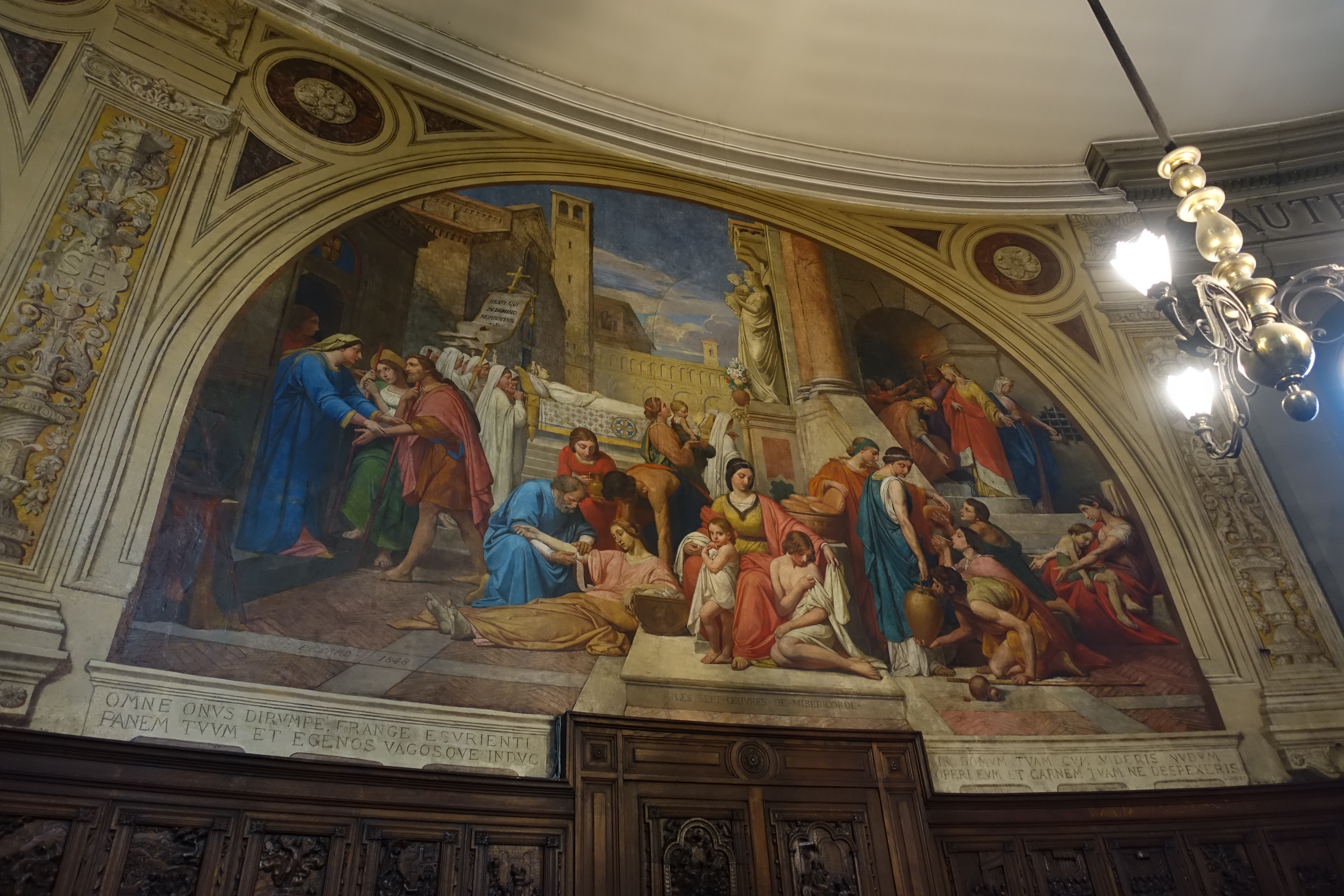
"The Seven Works of Misercordia " by Jean-Louis Bezard (1799-1881) (in the Disambulatory)

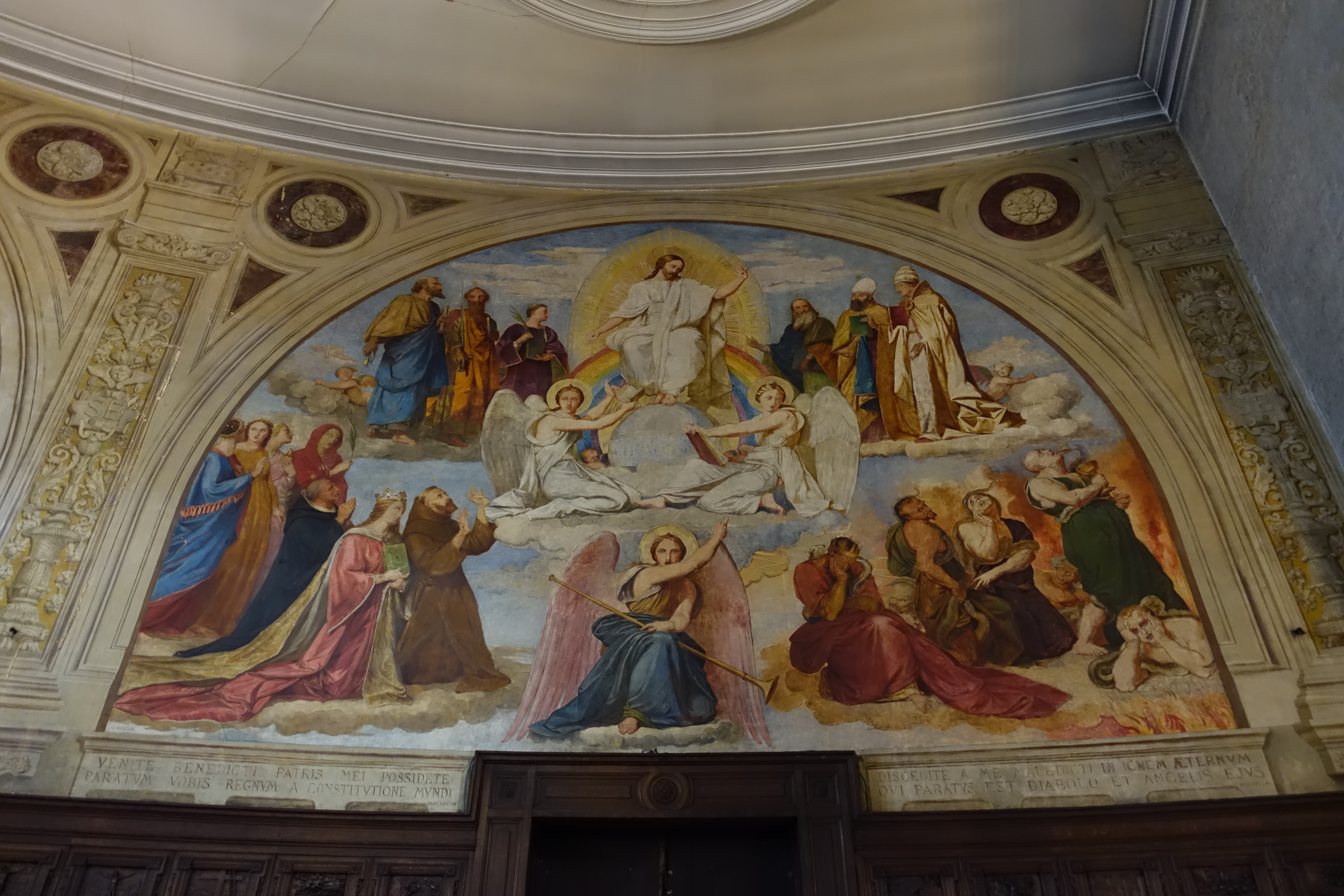
«The Last Judgement" by Adolphe Roger (1800-1880) (in the Disambulatory)

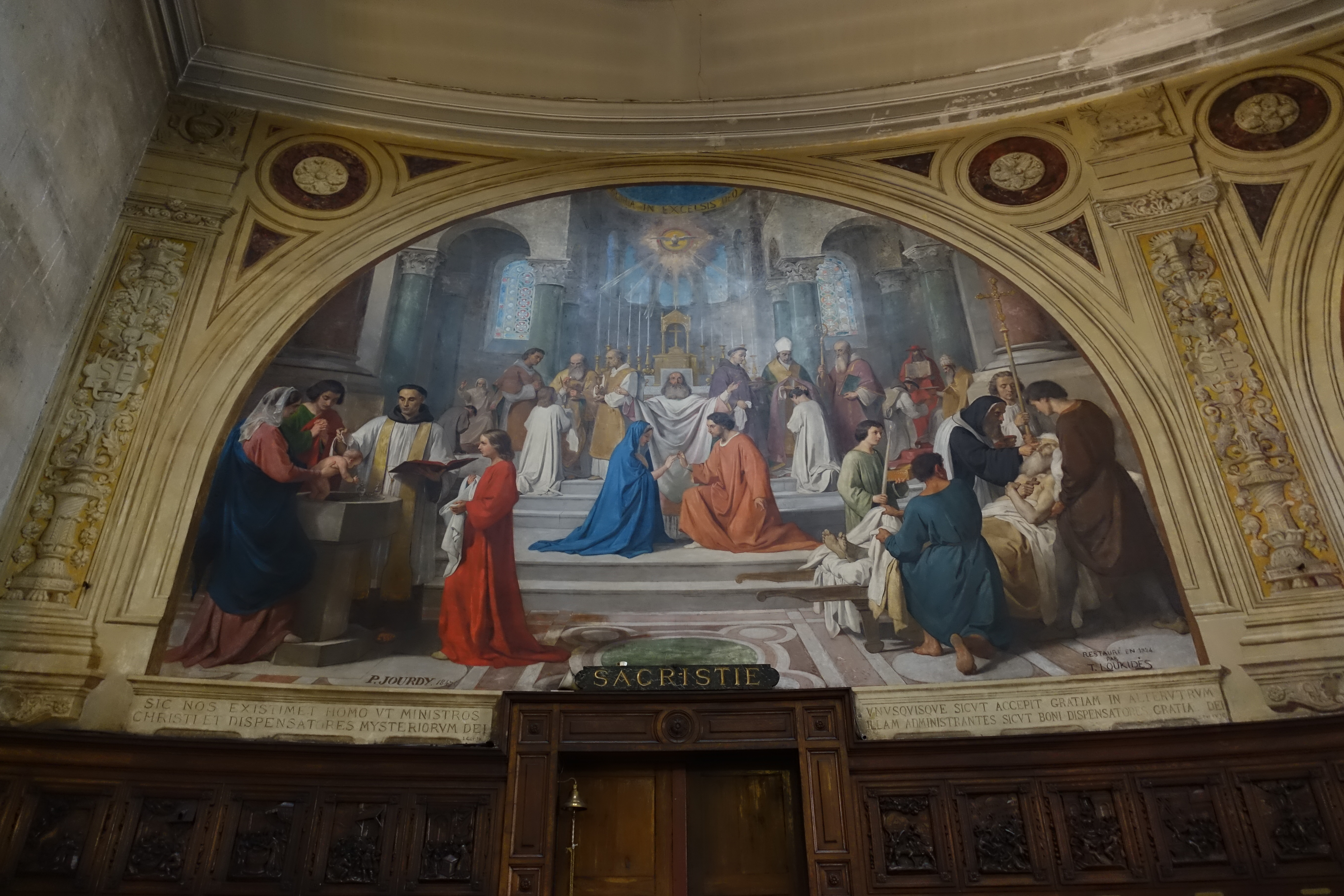
"The Seven Sacraments" by Paul Jourdy (1805-1856) (in the Disambulatory)

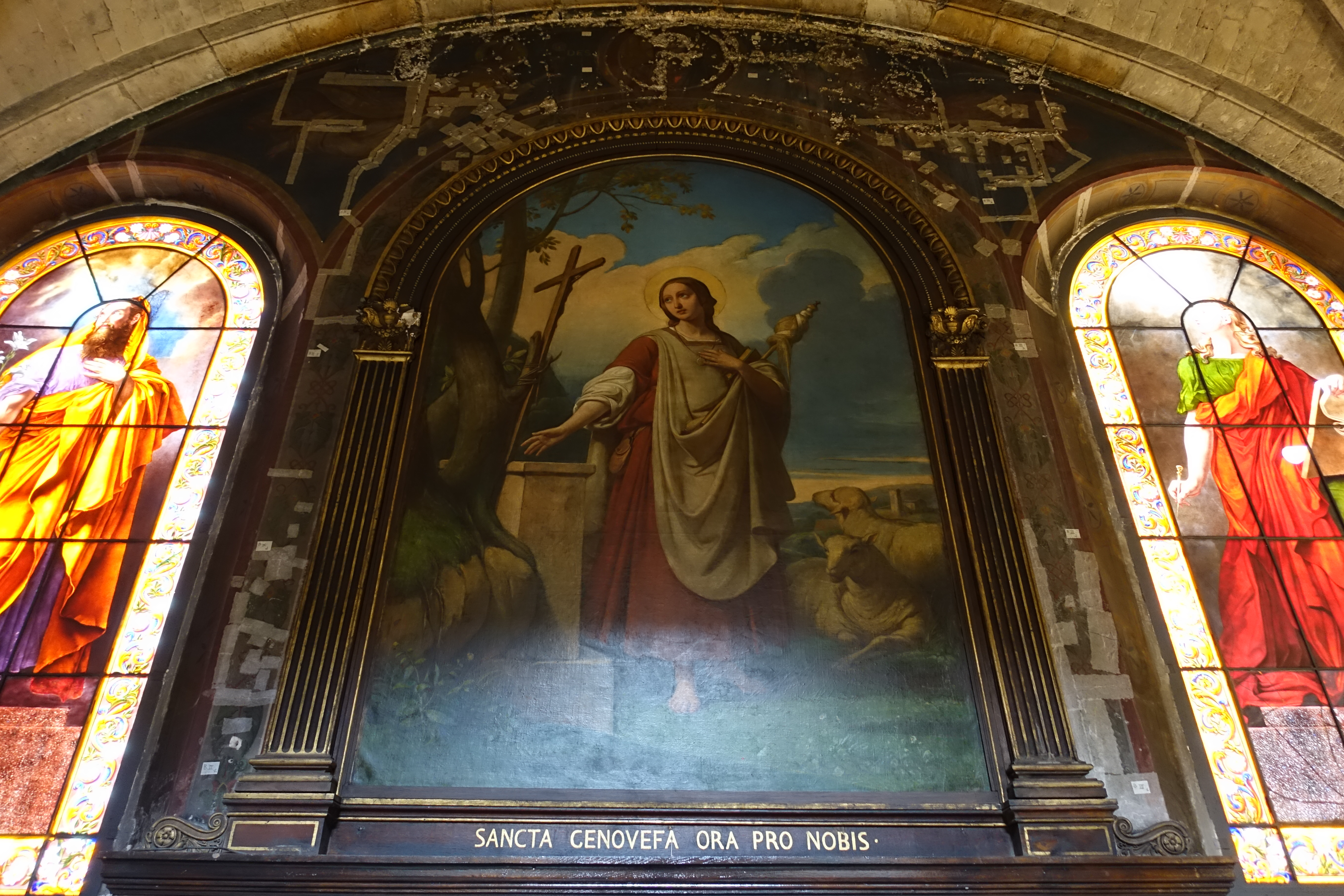
"Saint Genevieve guarding her flock" (19th c.) between two stained glass windows

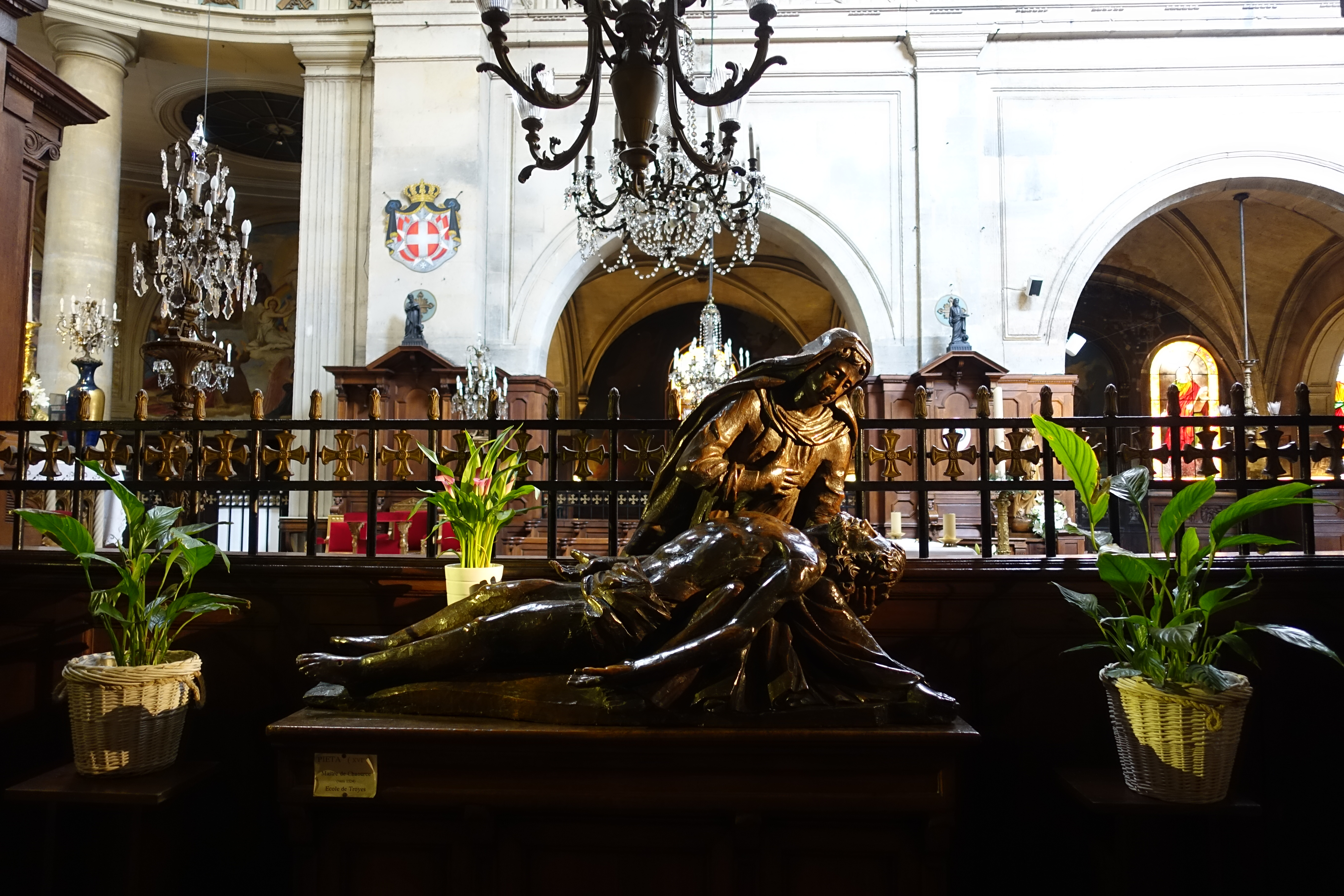
Pieta - Christ with the Virgin Mary (17th c.)

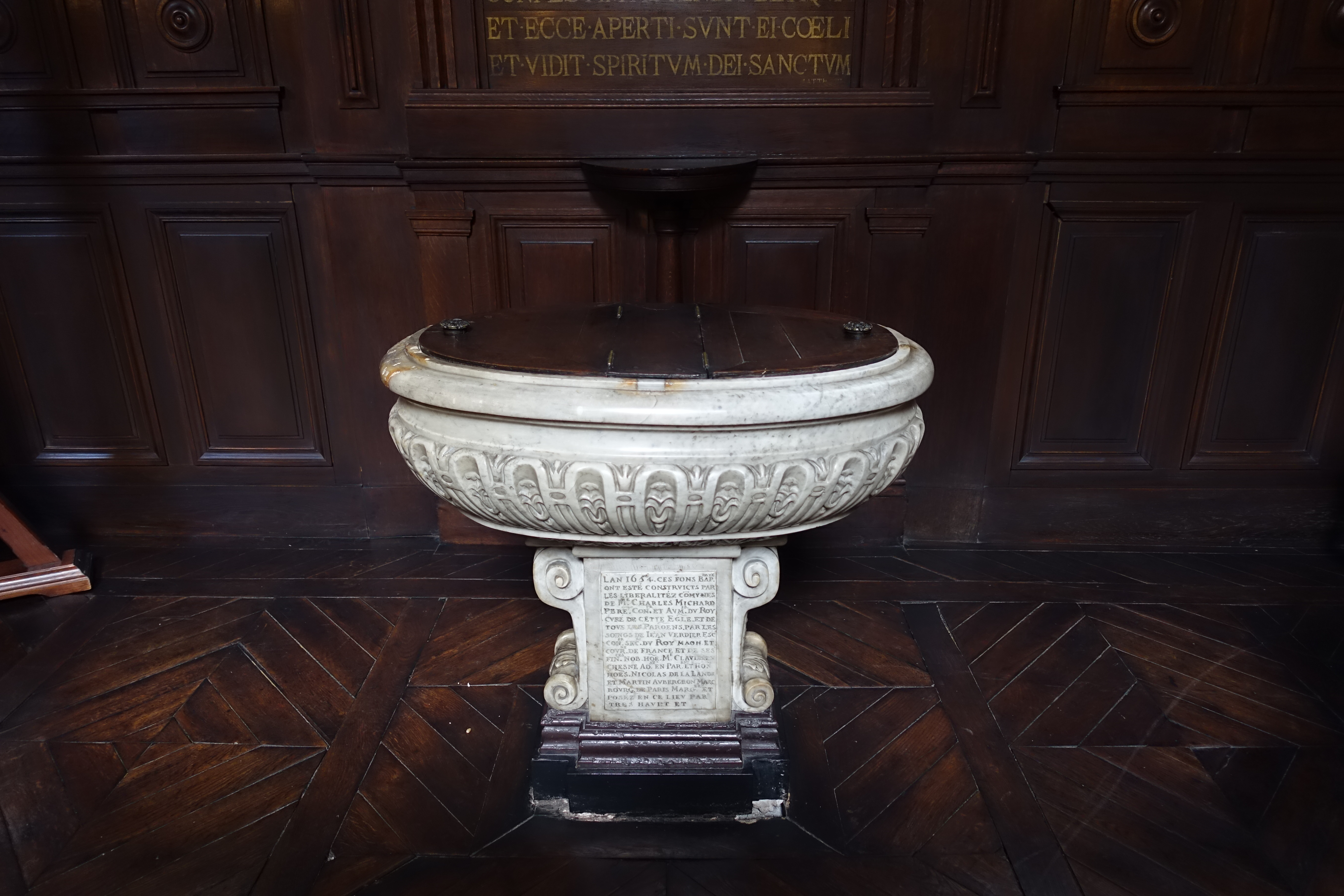
Marble Baptismal Font (1654)

== The Organ ==
The grand organ of the church is located on the tribune just above the entrance to the nave. It has three keyboards, with thirty-nine stops, and thirty pedals. It was the largest instrument constructed by Louis Marie and Paul Louis Suret, and was inaugurated in 1853. It underwent modification by the Gutschenritter firm later in the 19th century, then underwent a major restoration by the firm Girout in 1994-1999 to restore the integrity and sound of the original instrument. The grand organ is classified as an object of historical importance by the French Ministry of Culture.

The church has a smaller organ located in the choir, behind the main altar. This organ was built by John Abbey, installed in 1925, and modified in the late 1950s.

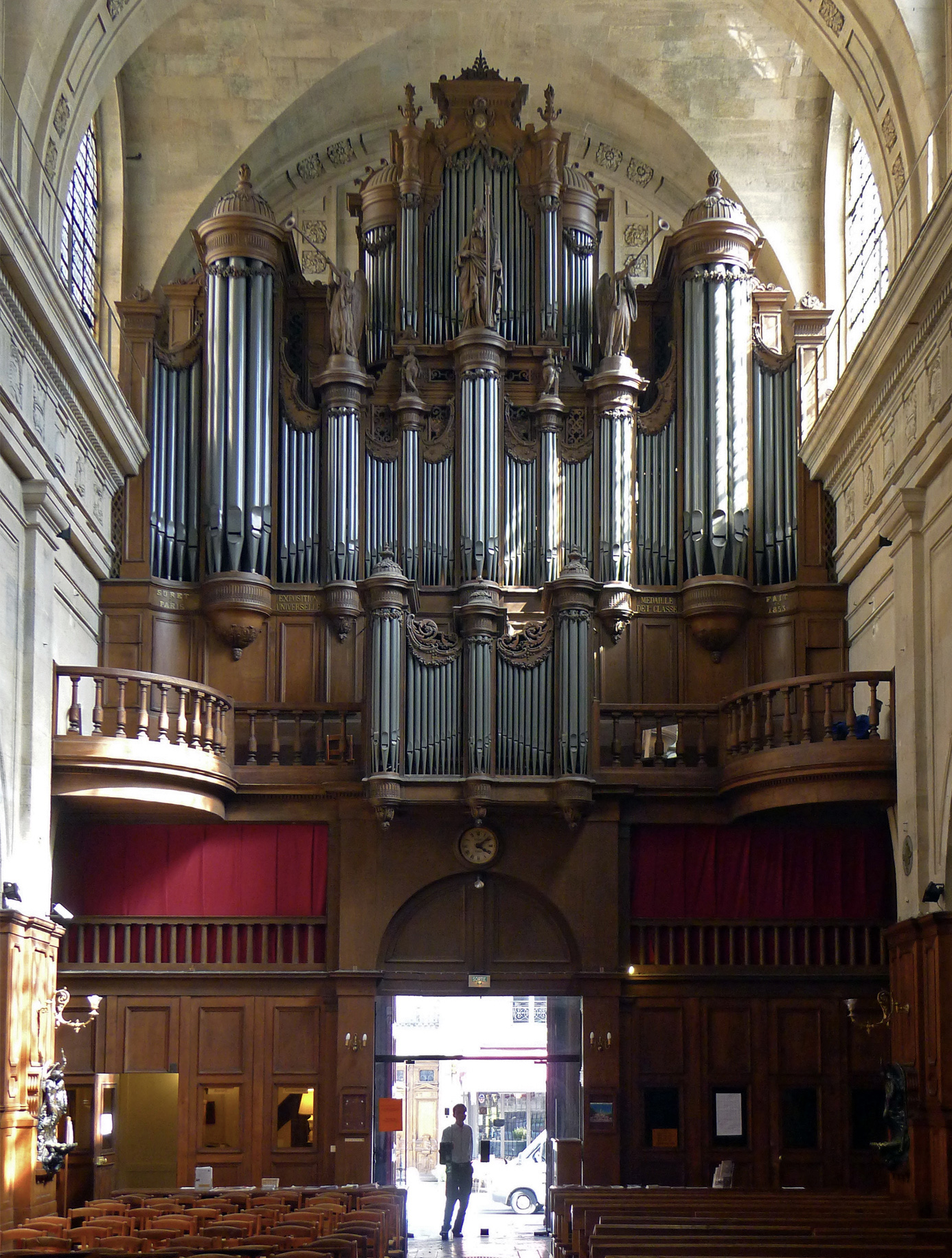
The organ on the tribune over the portal

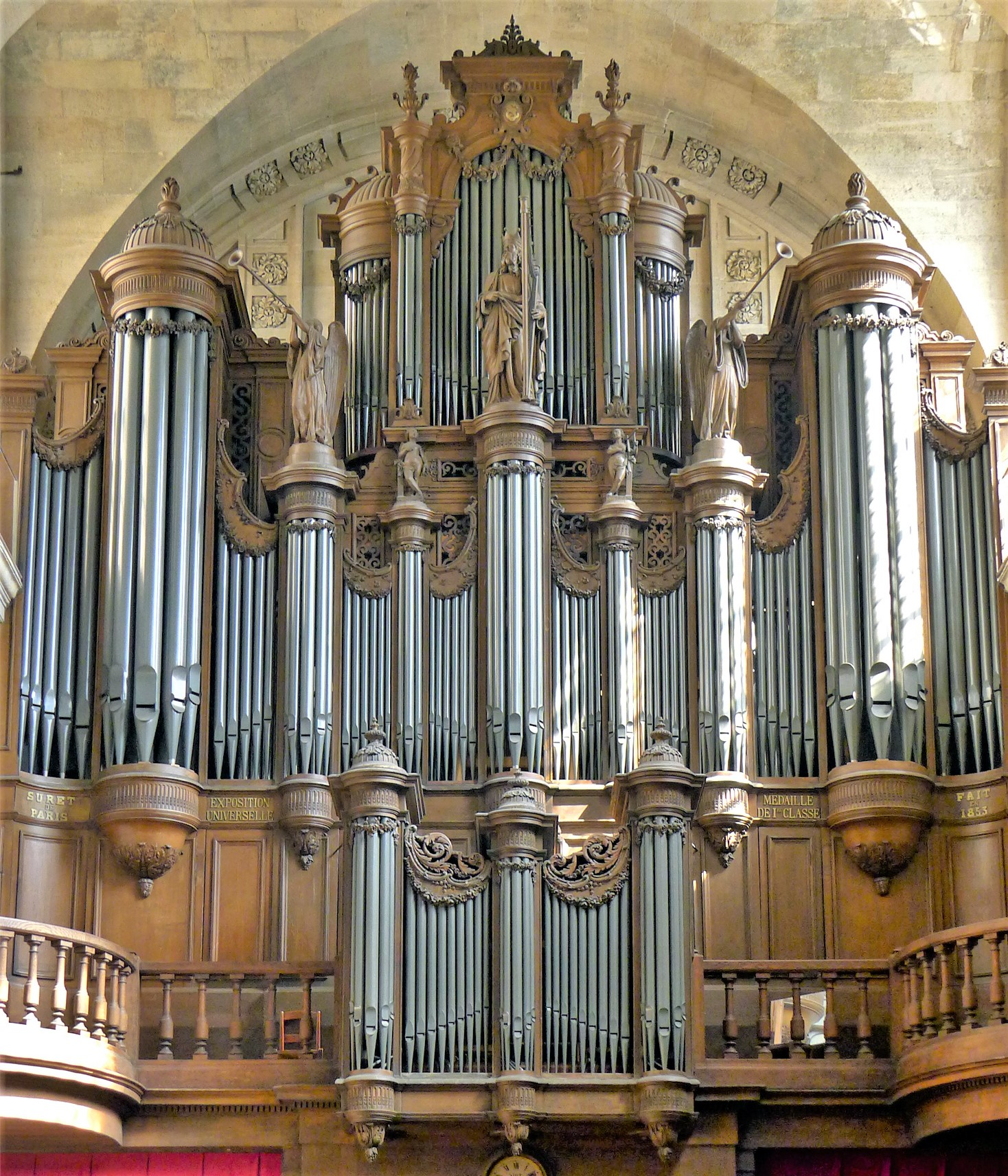
Detail of the organ case
