= Abraham Willet =

Dutch art collector and amateur painter

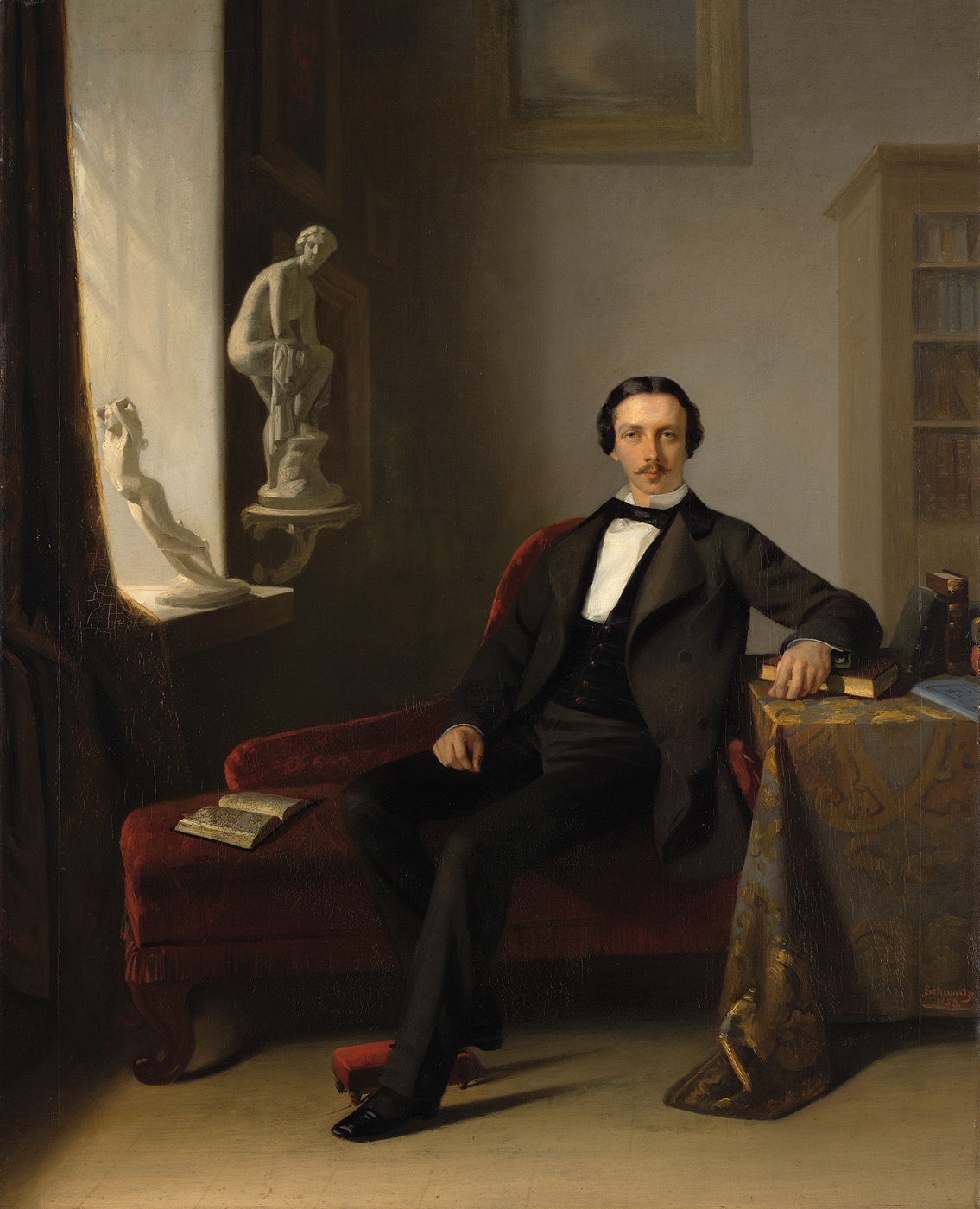
- Willet in his studio in 1853 by Johan Georg Schwartze
- Born: 25 May 1825; Amsterdam
- Died: 7 October 1888 (aged 63); Amsterdam

Abraham Willet (1825–1888) was a Dutch art collector and amateur painter.

Willet was born in Amsterdam and married Louisa Holthuysen on 17 July 1861.

Willet was a member of Arti et Amicitiae. For years, his art collection was considered the basis of the Willet-Holthuysen museum collection, but recent research has shown that his wife was perhaps more influential in forming the collection.

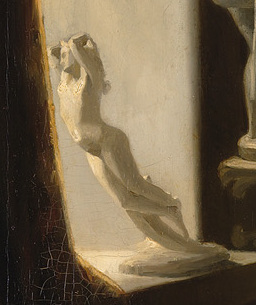
Une heure de la nuit, by Joseph Michel Ange Pollett

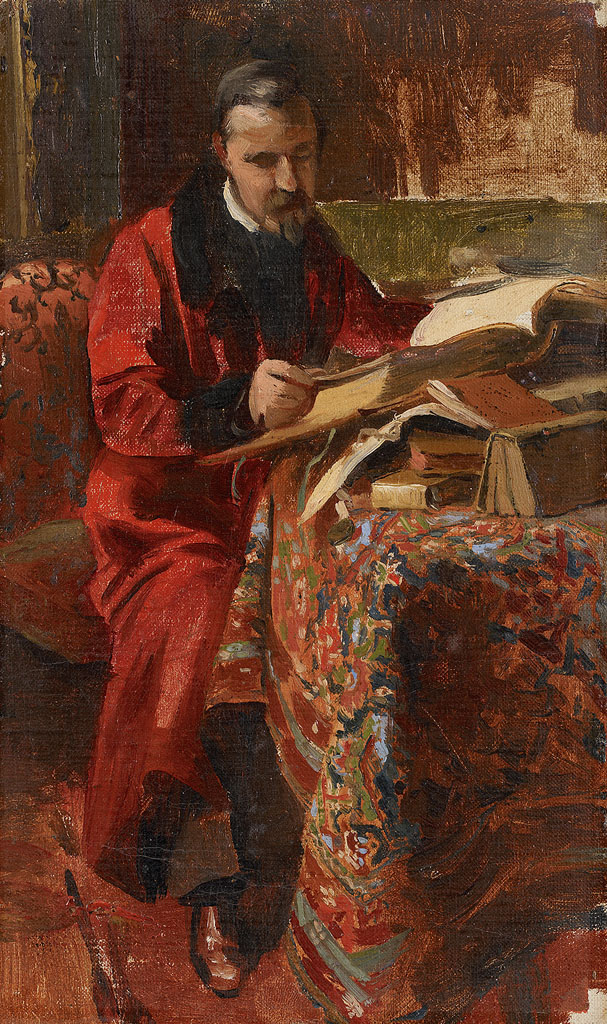
Portrait of Willet by Coen Metzelaar

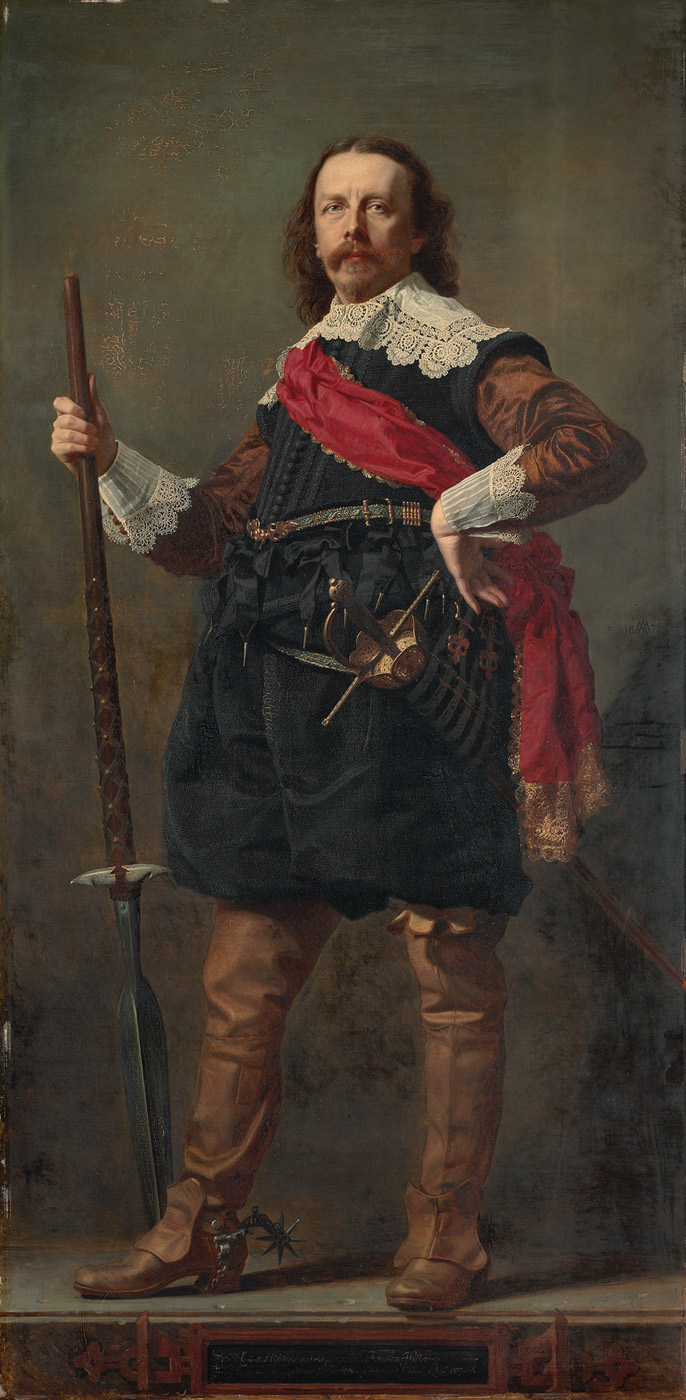
Willet in a schutterij costume, by Andrzej Jerzy Mniszech, 1877
