= Louisa Holthuysen =

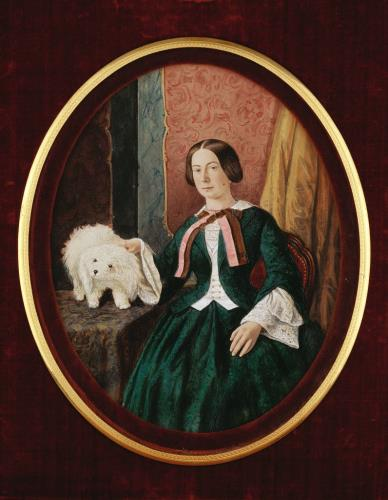
- Miniature portrait of Louisa Holthuysen with her Maltese lion dog, c. 1840-1860
- Born: 28 November 1824; Amsterdam
- Died: 30 January 1895 (aged 70); Amsterdam

Sandrina Louisa Geertruida Holthuysen (1824 – 1895) was a Dutch art collector and founder of the Museum Willet-Holthuysen in Amsterdam.

== Biography ==
Holthuysen was born in Amsterdam in the Netherlands as the only child of Pieter Gerard Holthuysen, a wealthy merchant who dealt in window glass and coal. Her father died in 1858 and in 1861 she married Abraham Willet and they proceeded to live a bohemian lifestyle, enjoying travel and art collecting. The art collection included items bought by her, of which the most expensive painting was a still-life by Blaise Alexandre Desgoffe that cost 5,000 guilders.

Holthuysen died childless in Amsterdam in 1895, a few years after her husband. Her house and its contents, including the artworks, were left to the City of Amsterdam, conditional upon the building being used as a museum named after her and her husband.

== Gallery ==
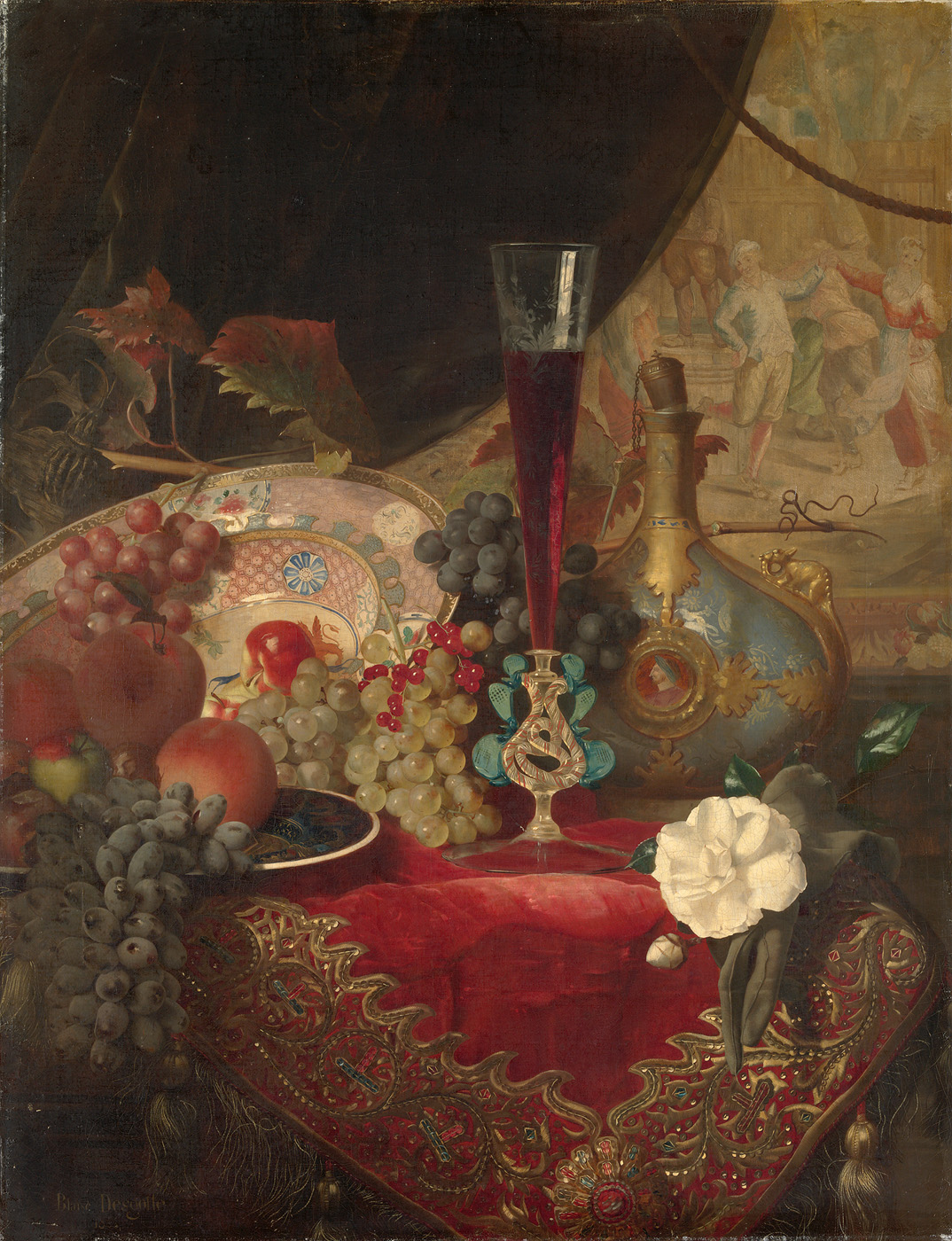
Still-life by Blaise-Alexandre Desgoffe

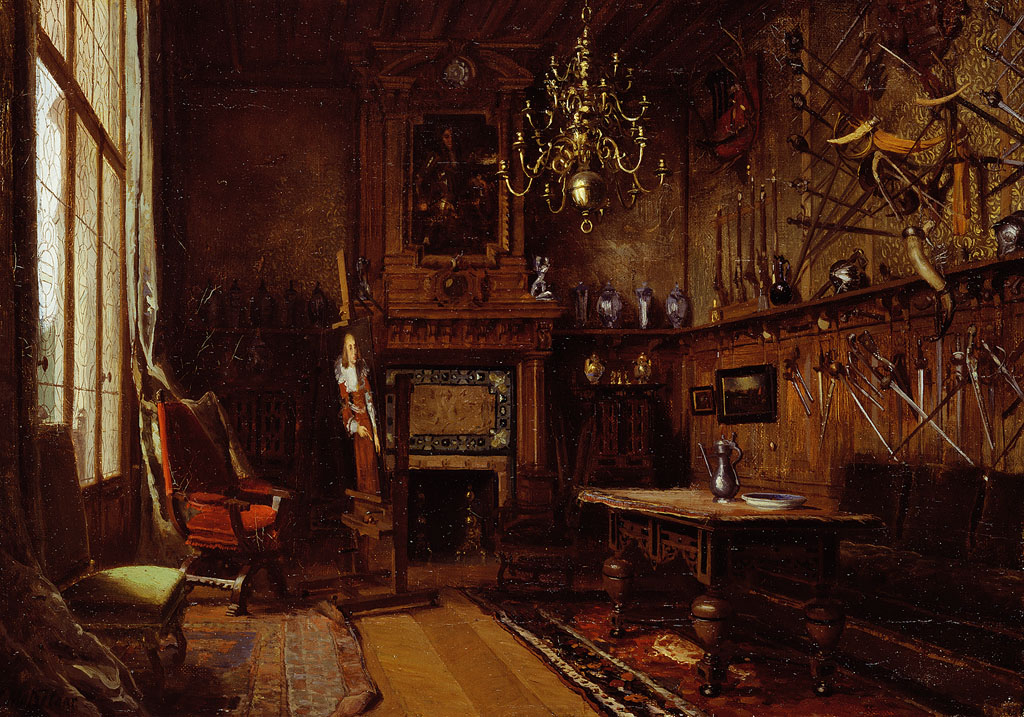
The parlour of the Willet-Holthuysens in their summer villa in Le Vésinet, by Coen Metzelaar

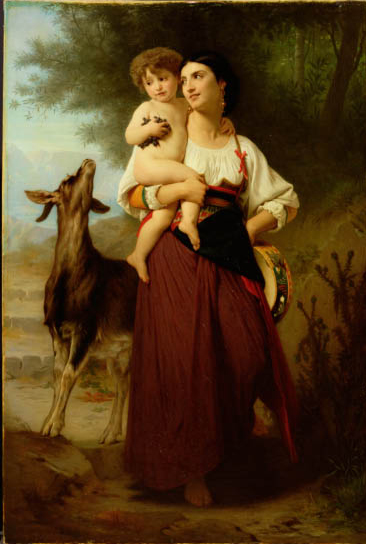
A Young Mother in the costume of the Campagna by William-Adolphe Bouguereau

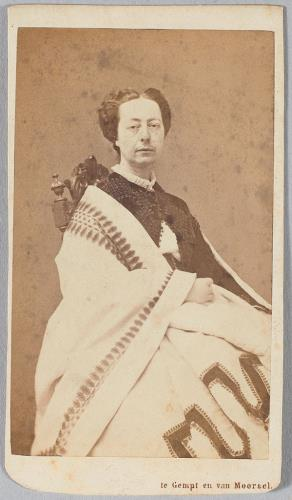
Louise Holthuysen, ca. 1864

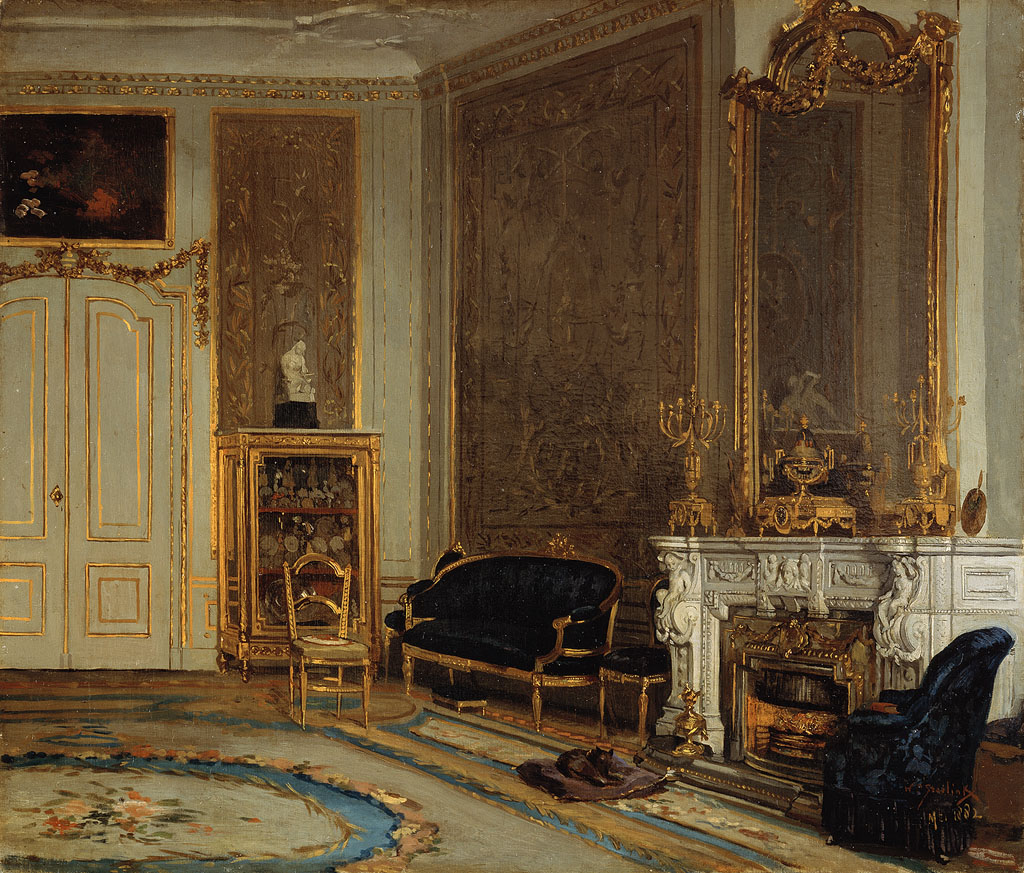
The parlour of the A. Willet-Holthuysen house, Herengracht 605, by Willem Steelink Jr., 1882
