= Joseph-Michel-Ange Pollet =

Italian sculptor

- Born: 1814; Palermo
- Died: 1870 (aged 55–56); Paris

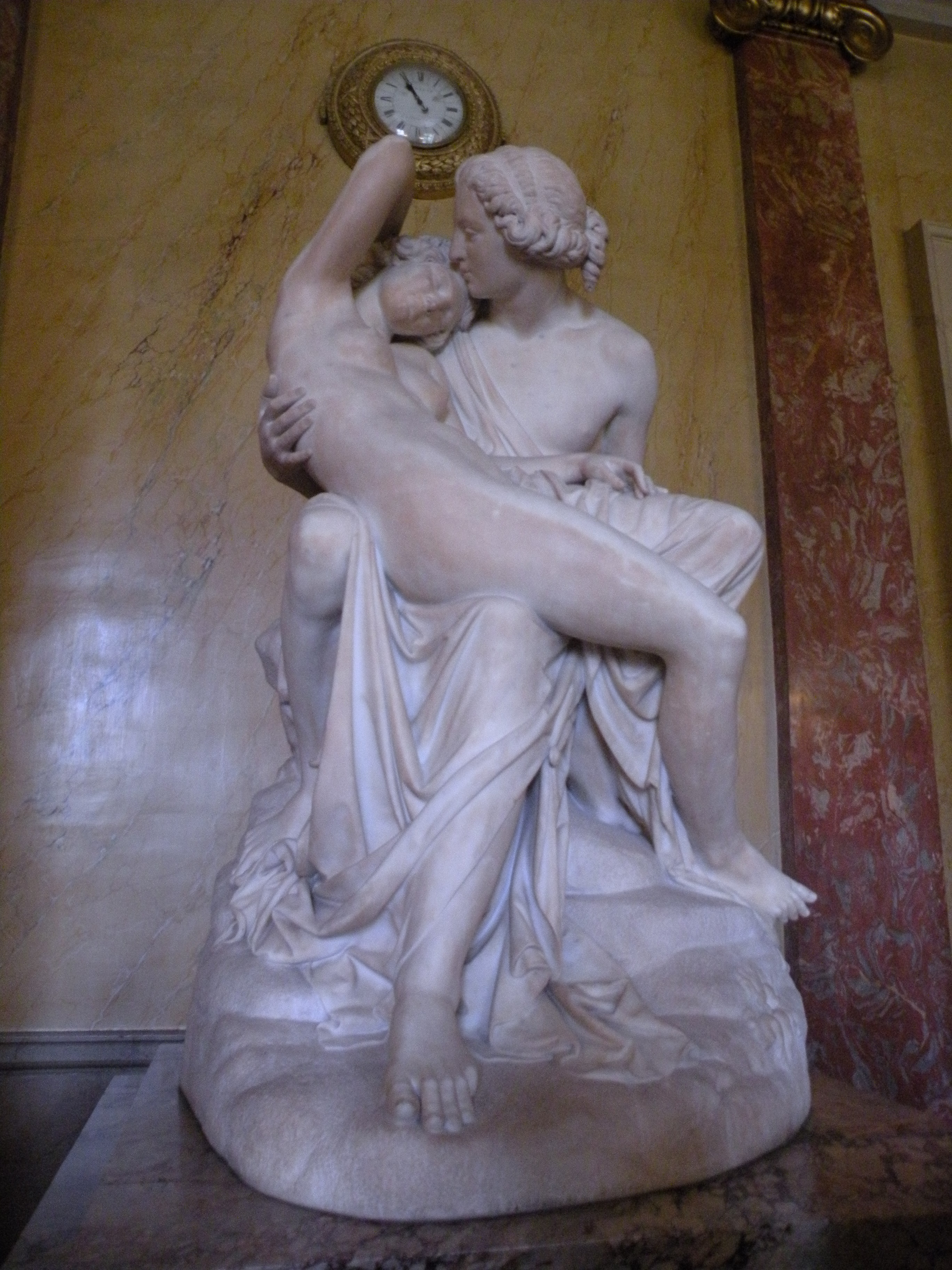
Achilles and Deidamia

Joseph-Michel-Ange Pollet (1814–1870) was an Italian sculptor.

Pollet was born in Palermo and studied there under Valerio Villareale, then under Bertel Thorvaldsen and Pietro Tenerani. He was active at least 5 years in Belgium and won several medals at the Paris Salon:

- a bronze medal in 1847
- a silver medal in 1848
- a gold medal in 1851
- a silver medal in 1855

His Une heure de la nuit was well received in 1848 and many copies were made in plaster, bronze and marble. A plaster cast of it is featured in a portrait of the Amsterdam collector Abraham Willet in his studio by the Dutch portrait painter Johan Georg Schwartze.

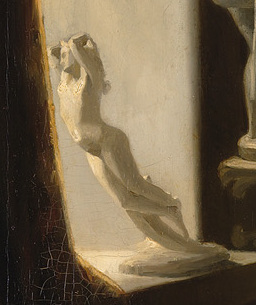
Une heure de la nuit in Schwartze's 1853 portrait

Pollet died in Paris.
