= Eliezer and Rebecca =

Eliezer and Rebecca is the title of two paintings by Nicolas Poussin:

- Eliezer and Rebecca (Poussin, Fitzwilliam)
- Eliezer and Rebecca (Poussin, Louvre)
