= Guillaume de Lamoignon =

French jurist (1617–1677)

Guillaume de Lamoignon (1617–1677) was a French jurist. He is known for work which he did towards preparing the codification of French laws.

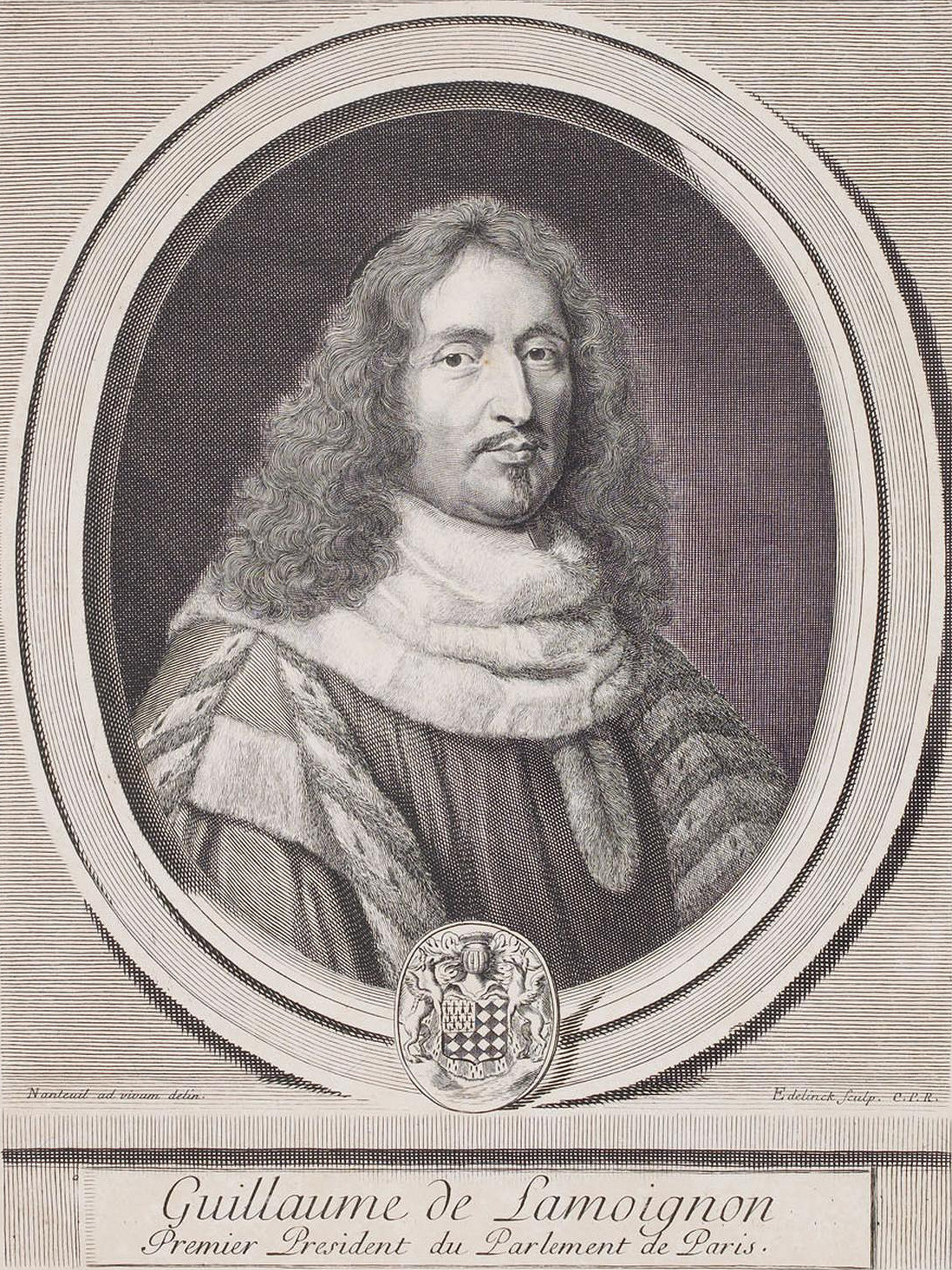
Guillaume de Lamoignon.

== Biography ==
He became in 1644 master of requests in the Parlement. He took an active part in the Fronde of the Parlement against Mazarin.

He became first president of the Parlement in 1658. A distinguished member of the Compagnie du Saint-Sacrement, he was greatly devoted to the Catholic cause. He induced Colbert to give up the idea of putting back to twenty-seven the age for ordination to priesthood, and the years required for monastic vows to twenty for the women and twenty-seven for the men.

First on the popular, and later on the royalist side during the Fronde, he presided at the earlier sittings of the trial of Nicolas Fouquet, whom he regarded as innocent. Lamoignon tried to simplify the laws of France and sought the society of men of letters like Gilles Boileau and Jean Racine.

He had Gallican tendencies, and in 1663 he spoke before the Parlement in favor of the "liberties of the Gallican church" against a thesis suspected of ultramontanism. A nephew of Bishop Potier of Beauvais, a close friend of the Jansenist Hermant, Lamoignon was supposed to sympathize with Port Royal, but he chose René Rapin, a Jesuit, as tutor for his sons, whom he also brought into close acquaintance with Bourdaloue. When in 1664 the Jansenists deferred to the Parlement a confutation of Pascal's Provinciales written by the Jesuits, the decree which condemned this book nevertheless spared the Jesuits. On this occasion Lamoignon said to the king that he had been "a witness of the unfair outbursts of the Jansenists in all the differences they had with the Society of Jesus; and this Jansenist party, which was being formed in the kingdom on the dissemination of the new teaching, was but a cabal which would become pernicious to the State".

It was Lamoignon who, having as first president to settle the dispute that had arisen at the Sainte-Chapelle between the precentor and the treasurer regarding a desk, furnished Boileau with the account of this incident from which the latter evolved the celebrated poem of the "Lutrin".

=== Marriage and children ===
He married on 14 November 1640 Madeleine Potier, daughter of Nicolas IV Potier. They had :

- Chrétien-André (1641–1643)
- Chrétien-André (1643–1644)
- Chrétien-François (1644–1709), Président à mortier of the Parlement, married Marie-Jeanne Voisin
- René (1646–1652)
- Nicolas (1648–1724), intendant over the Languedoc
- Marie (1645-1733), married Victor-Maurice de Broglie, Marshal of France
- Anne-Madeleine (1649-1671), married Achille III de Harlay Count of Beaumont (1639-1712)
- Elisabeth (born 1650), a nun
- Anne (born 1654), a nun
- Christine (1657–1659)
