= François Emmanuel Toulongeon =

French politician and historian

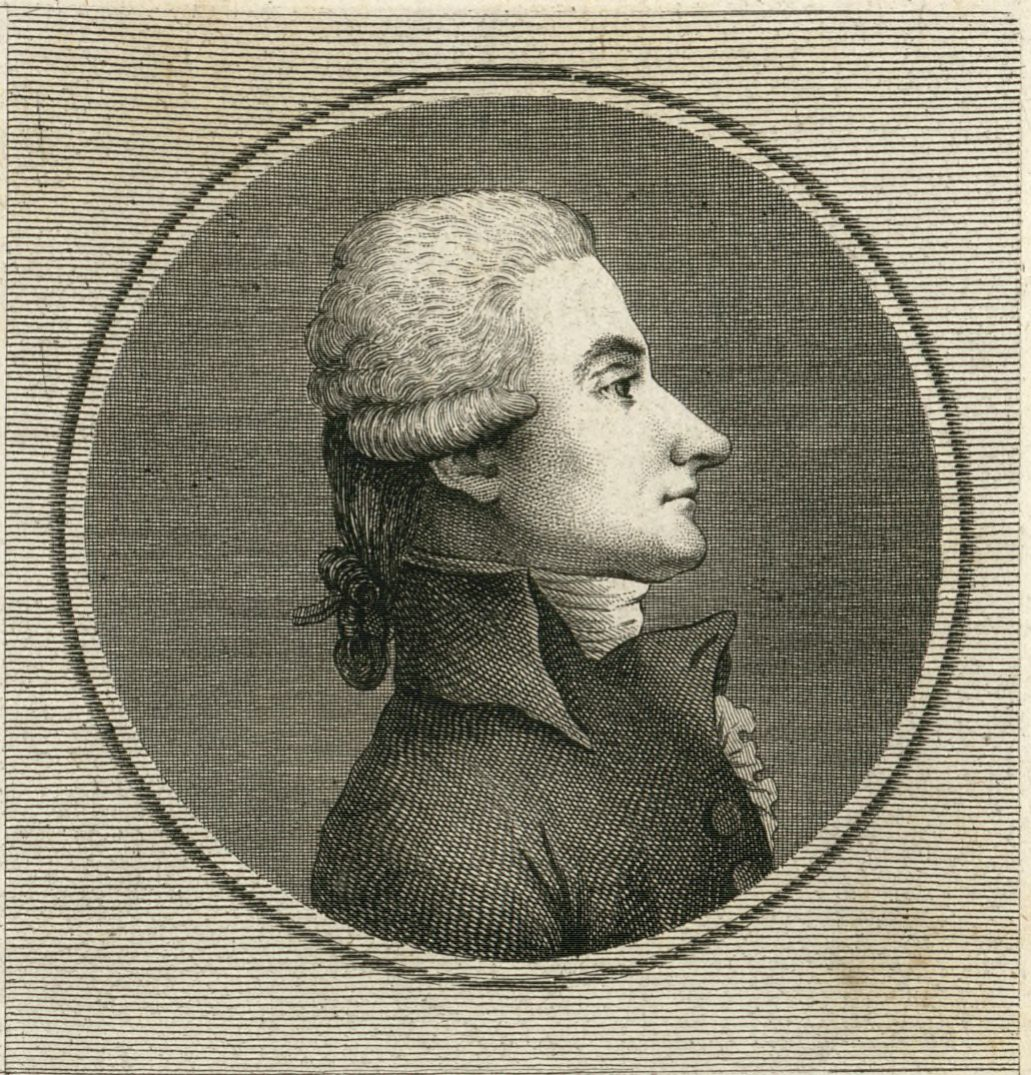
Toulongeon (engraving by E A Giraud after Olivier Perrin

François-Emmanuel Toulongeon or François Emmanuel d'Emskerque, vicomte de Toulongeon (3 December 1748 - 23 December 1812) was a French politician and historian, deputy to the Estates General of 1789 and author of a Histoire de la Révolution de 1789.

== Life ==
Born at the château de Champlitte, François Emmanuel was the third son of count François-Joseph de Toulongeon and Anne Prosper Cordier Delaunay, after René Hippolyte (1739–1794) and Edmé Alexandre (1741–1823). He initially served in the army, leaving with the rank of colonel in 1789. Whilst in the army he became known for his writing and was elected to the Académie de Besançon in 1779. In his acceptance speech he praised Voltaire and Fontenelle

In 1788 he published Principes naturels et constitutifs des assemblées nationales (Natural and Constituent Principals of National Assemblies) which allowed him to be elected deputy for the nobility for the bailiwick (in French, bailliage) of Aval in Lons-le-Saunier at the Estates General of 1789. He was one of the first nobles to back the third estate on 25 June 1789. During his career as a deputy he mainly worked on military questions. After the end of the Constituent Assembly in 1791 he briefly became an army officer again before being dismissed on 20 April 1792, the same day as his brother Edmé Alexandre, and retiring to the country.

François Emmanuel Toulongeon returned to public life in 1796. The following year he published a Manuel révolutionnaire (Revolutionary Manual), which brought him election to the Institut national in 1797, in the first section of the class of moral and political sciences, alongside the 'Idéologues' Cabanis, Ginguené and Volney. This began his interest in writing history.

In 1797 he married Luce-Antoinette-Émilie Bertaux, daughter of the painter Jacques Bertaux. He published his Histoire de la Révolution de 1789 between 1801 and 1810. He was elected deputy for Nièvre in the Corps Législatif in 1802 and 1809 and became interested in economics in 1802, proposing a modern analysis of the consulate's monetary situation.

== Lettres de la Vendée ==
March 1801 saw the publication of the Lettres de la Vendée, signed 'madame Éie. T***' (François Emmanuel's wife Émilie). Its attribution is debated, with Antoine-Alexandre Barbier in his Dictionnaire des ouvrages anonymes et pseudonymes considering François-Emmanuel to be the author but Pierre-Philippe Grappin in his Notice historique sur la vie et les ouvrages de M. le Général de Toulongeon arguing he was merely editor of Lettres.

== Works ==
- Principes naturels et constitutifs des assemblées nationales, 1788.
- Opinion de M. le vicomte de Toulongeon sur l'organisation de l'armée, s. d.
- Éloge véridique de François-Apolline de Guibert, Paris, Lejai, 1790.
- Manuel révolutionnaire, ou pensée morales sur l'état politique des Peuples en révolution, Paris, Du Pont, an IV.
- « De l'influence du régime diététique d'une nation sur son état politique », read 2 fructidor year V, Mémoires de l'Institut national des sciences et arts. Sciences morales et politiques, Paris, Baudouin, t. III, prairial an IX, p. 102-113.
- Histoire de France depuis la Révolution de 1789, Paris, Treuttel et Würtz, 1801-1810 (4 volumes in-4° et 7 volumes in-8°) Online version]
- Manuel du Muséum français, avec une description analytique et raisonnée de chaque tableau, Paris, Treuttel et Würtz, 1802–1808.
- Éloge historique de A. G. Camus, Paris, Baudouin, 1806.
- Les Commentaires de César (translation), Paris, Verdière, Magimel, 1813, 2 vol.

== Bibliography ==
- (in French) Olivier Ritz (2016). "Toulongeon, un écrivain au tournant des Lumières". Les Métaphores naturelles dans le débat sur la Révolution. Paris: Classiques Garnier. pp. 261–293. doi:10.58079/qynv.
- (in French) Alphonse Aulard (1910). Études et leçons sur la Révolution française. Paris: Félix Alcan. pp. 110–128.
- (in French) P. Lachaux (1947). Les Seigneurs de Champlitte. Les Toulongeon. Nemours: Imprimerie André Lescot.
- (in French) Guy Thuillier (1983). "Les idées monétaires du vicomte de Toulongeon". La Monnaie de France au début du XIXe siècle. Genève: Librairie Droz. pp. 205–214. ISBN 978-2-600-03395-4.
- (in French) Marie-Nicolas Bouillet; Alexis Chassang, eds. (1878). "François Emmanuel Toulongeon". Dictionnaire universel d'histoire et de géographie.
- (in French) Pierre-Philippe Grappin (1813). Notice historique sur la vie et les ouvrages de M. le général de Toulongeon,... lue par M. le secrétaire perpétuel en séance publique de la Société académique de Besançon, le 14 août 1813.
