= Achille III de Harlay =

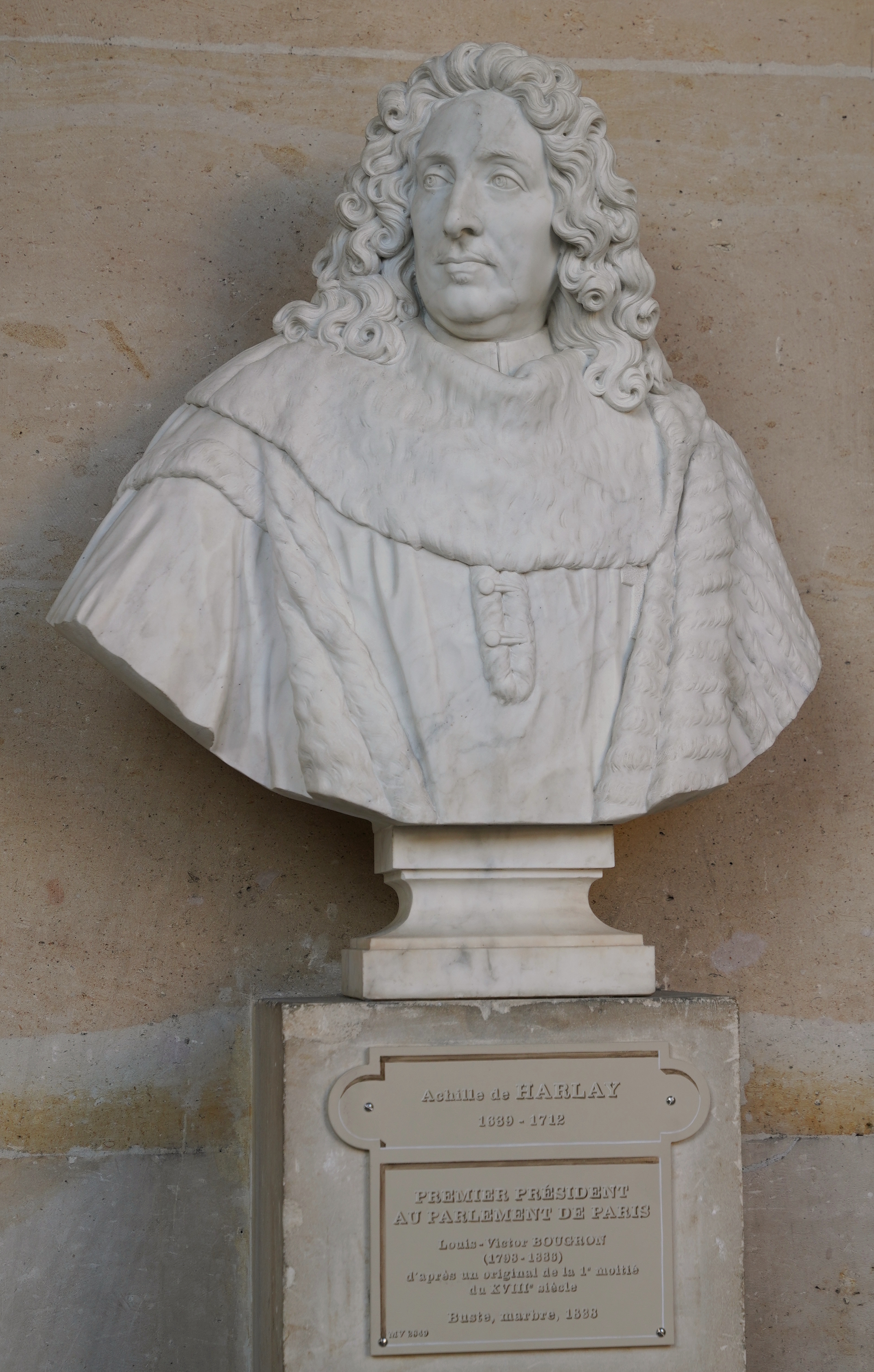
1833 bust of Achille III de Harlay by Louis-Victor Bougron, after an 18th-century original.

Achille III de Harlay, count of Beaumont, lord of Grosbois (1 August 1639 - 23 July 1712) was a French magistrate and legal expert.

== Life ==
Born in Paris, he was the great-grandson of the First President of the Parliament of Paris Achille de Harlay, and grandson of Christophe II de Harlay de Beaumont. His parents were Marie de Bellièvre and Achille II, procureur général in the same court and to the Parliament of Paris. The future Achille III was made a counsellor on 3 August 1657, before replacing his father as procureur général on 4 June 1667, then (like his great-uncle) was appointed First President from 12 November 1689 to 1707.

With legal and literature knowledge, he exercised influence over his companions, knowing well how to make them follow the will of Louis XIV, to who he was very devoted.

A friend of Madame de Maintenon, he made major contributions to the legitimation of Louis's children in the affair of the king's bastards.

== Bibliography (in French) ==
- Edouard Pilastre, Achille III de Harlay, 1er président du Parlement de Paris sous le règne de Louis XIV, sans date [1904], Paris, Calmann-Levy, IV-190 pages, online version;
