= Jacques Thuillier =

French art historian

- Born: 18 March 1928; Vaucouleurs, Meuse, France
- Died: 18 October 2011 (aged 83); Paris
- Education: École normale supérieure, Paris (1951–1955); Sorbonne
- Occupations: Art historian, honorary professor at the Collège de France

Jacques Thuillier (March 18, 1928, Vaucouleurs, Meuse – October 18, 2011, Paris) was a French art historian specializing in 17th-century French painting.

Thuillier was an honorary professor at the Collège de France, where he taught history of artistic creation from 1977 to 1998. He was a renowned specialist of French painting and, alongside the late Anthony Blunt, a leading authority on Nicolas Poussin. He published seminal works on the leading French painters of the time, including Simon Vouet, Georges de La Tour, the Le Nain brothers, Laurent de La Hyre, Sébastien Bourdon, Jacques Blanchard and Lubin Baugin. His publications on those painters often took the form of both an exhibition catalogue and a catalogue raisonné based on extensive archival research.

An avid collector, Thuillier donated, while still alive, along with his brother Guy Thuillier, his collection of drawings (2,000) and engravings (13,000) to the Museum of Fine Arts of Nancy and part of his collection of paintings to the art museum at Vic-sur-Seille. He donated to the city of Nevers part of his archives, his library, a collection of drawings and engravings, and his collections of photographs, thus making the Nevers Médiathèque into a documentation centre for French painting of the 17th century. Another part of these archives and manuscripts is held at the INHA (fr), in Paris.

== Main publications ==
- French Painting, Rizzoli International Publications
- Fragonard, Rizzoli International Publications
- Les Prophètes: Vitraux de Sergio de Castro / Los Profetas: Vidrieras de Sergio de Castro (1984), Ediciones El Viso, Madrid, ISBN 84-86022-09-6
- Laurent de La Hyre 1606–1655 (1988), Geneva, Skira
- Georges de La Tour (1992), Paris, Flammarion
- Nicolas Poussin (1995), Flammarion, Paris, ISBN 2-08-012440-4
- Poussin before Rome: 1594–1624, translated from the French by Christopher Allen (1995), Richard L. Feigen & Co., London, New York, Chicago ISBN 1-873232-03-9
- Sébastien Bourdon 1616–1671 (2000), Éditions de la Réunion des musées nationaux, Paris
- Histoire de l'art (2002), Flammarion, Paris, ISBN 2-08-012535-4
- History of Art (2002), Flammarion, Paris, ISBN 2-08-010875-1
