= Louis-Victor Bougron =

French sculptor (1798–1879)

Louis-Victor Bougron (2 November 1798 - 10 December 1879) was a French sculptor. He is best known for the scandal in which he opposed Auguste de Forbin, the director general of the royal museums

== Life ==
Born on rue Saint-Denis in Paris, he was the grandson of Pierre-Amable Bougron, a former paper merchant and storekeeper in the royal press, and Louise-Amélie Milandre. Via his mother, Louis-Victor was great-grandson of Marie-Françoise Marchand, a famour actor in the Comédie-Française, known as Mlle Dumesnil.

Initially studying at the École des Arts et Métiers in Châlons, in 1817 he was seconded to Paris to administer hospices. He left that job in 1821 to study sculpture, becoming a pupil of Charles Dupaty. On 18 October 1823 he joined the École des beaux-arts de Paris and first exhibited at the Paris Salon of 1824, winning a second medal with a plaster statue titled The Spartan Othryades Dying for his Fatherland. In 1831 he exhibited a plaster group entitled King Pepin Descending into the Arena to Fight a Lion, a work complimented by Louis-Philippe I, who took him on to produce a marble copy to decorate a public square. That royal commission did not bring him the post of head of the Beaux-Arts, instead only receiving a first honourable mention. He insisted on claiming the post, with no success, and in 1832 published a booklet violently attacking the count of Forbin entitled Réclamation tardive. Petit mémoire contre M. le comte de Forbin, directeur-général des Musées royaux, par L.-V. Bougron, statuaire,

In 1837 he was living in Lille, where he taught drawing at the pensionnat du Sacré-Cœur. He producede several works for the city's churches and also worked for Cambrai, Saint-Omer, Arras and Boulogne-sur-Mer. He moved to Versailles in 1868 and was still living there in 1875 when he exhibited at the Paris Salon for the last time in 1875 and also dying there in 1879.

== Works ==
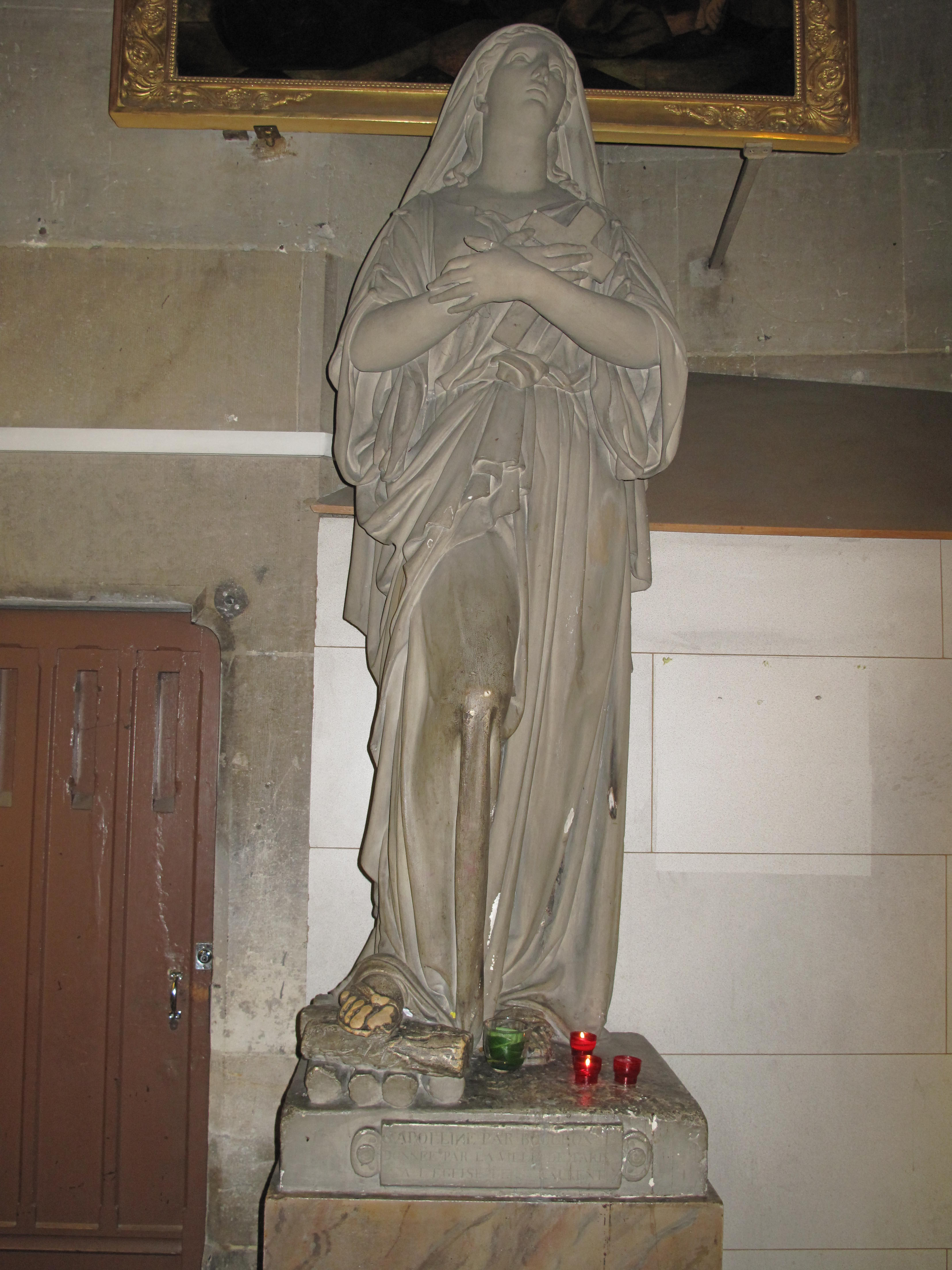
Saint Apollonia (1825), Paris, église Saint-Laurent.

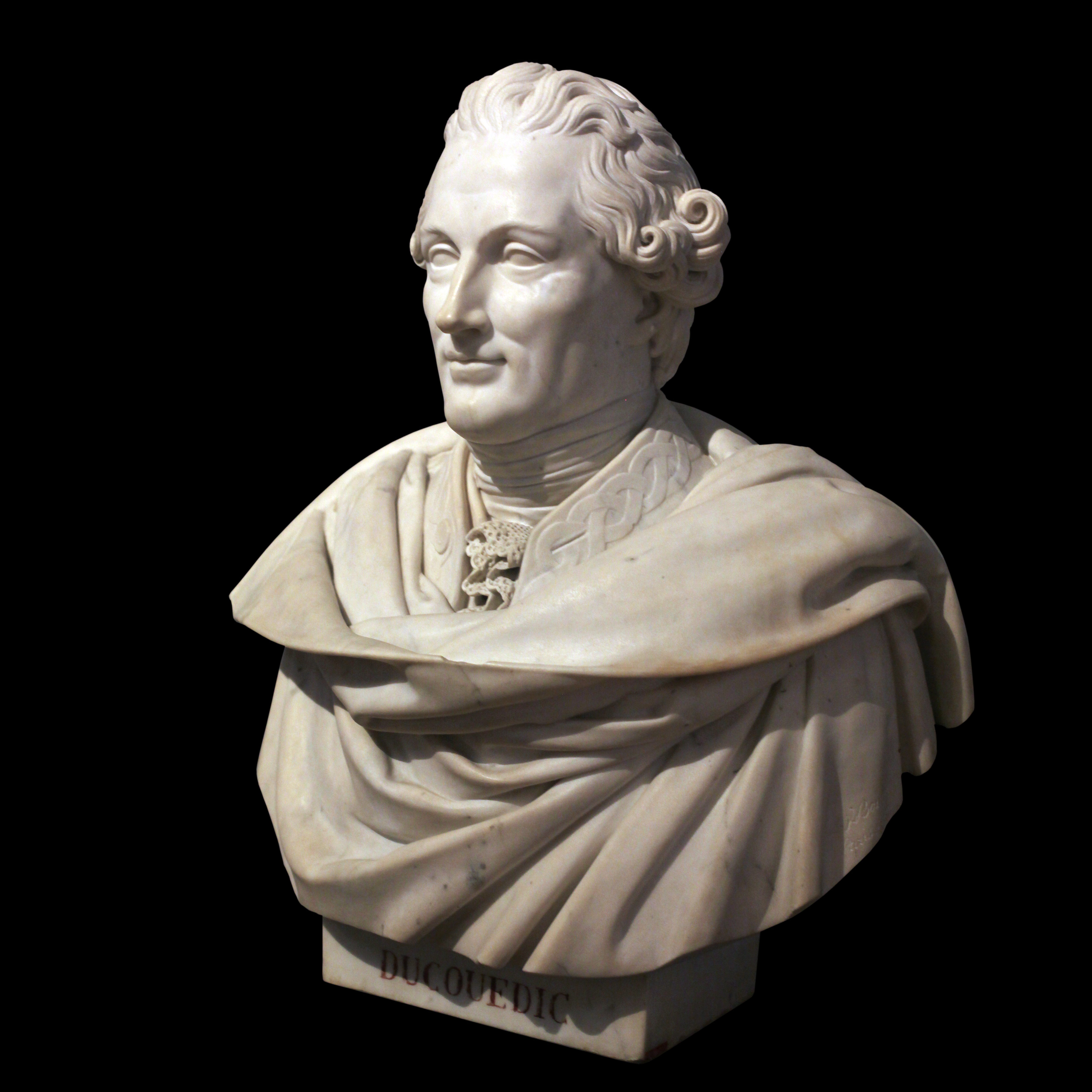
Charles-Louis, viscount of Le Couédic de Kergoualer (1740-1780), capitaine de vaisseau (1830), Paris, musée national de la Marine.
