= Eliezer and Rebecca (Poussin, Fitzwilliam) =

Painting by Nicolas Poussin

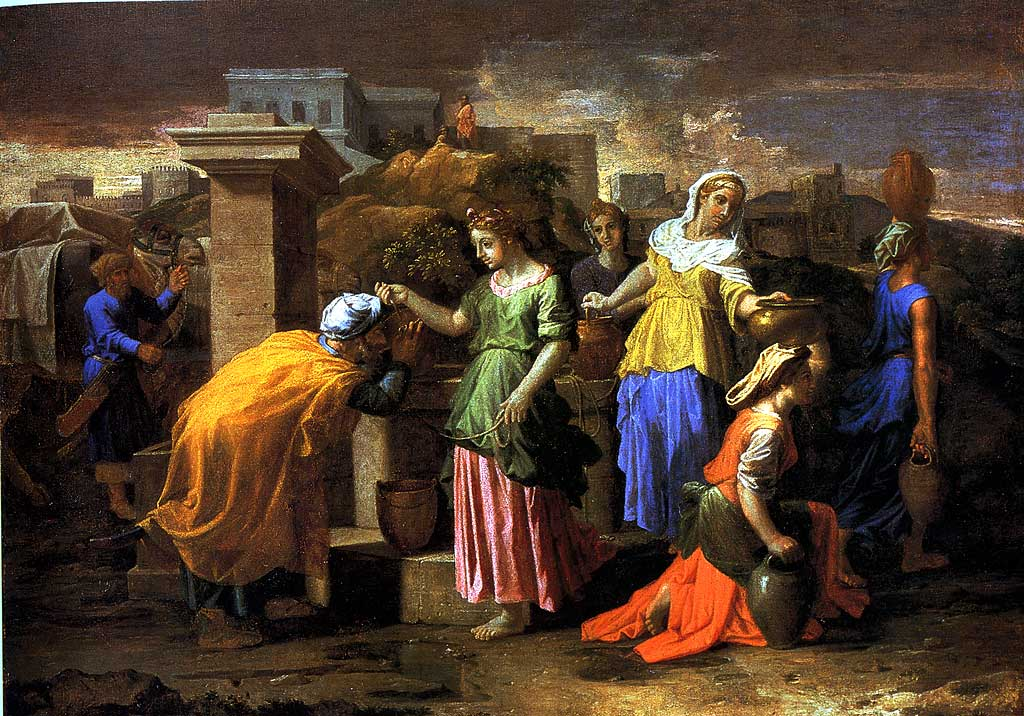

Eliezer and Rebecca is a painting by Nicolas Poussin, dated to 1660–1665 by Denis Mahon. It is in the Fitzwilliam Museum in Cambridge.

== History ==
The painting shows the biblical figure Rebecca quenching Eliezer's thirst.

Produced for Carlo Antonio dal Pozzo, a close friend of Poussin, its first sale record was in London in 1795. It was sold to art historian (and Cambridge spy) Anthony Blunt in 1933 and bought from his estate in 1984 by its present owner, the Fitzwilliam Museum. Victor Rothschild gave Blunt £100 to purchase the painting. The painting was sold by Blunt's executors for £100,000 (totalling £192,500 with tax remission).

== See also ==
- List of paintings by Nicolas Poussin
- Eliezer and Rebecca (Poussin, Louvre)
