= Self-Portrait (Poussin, 1649) =

Painting by Nicolas Poussin

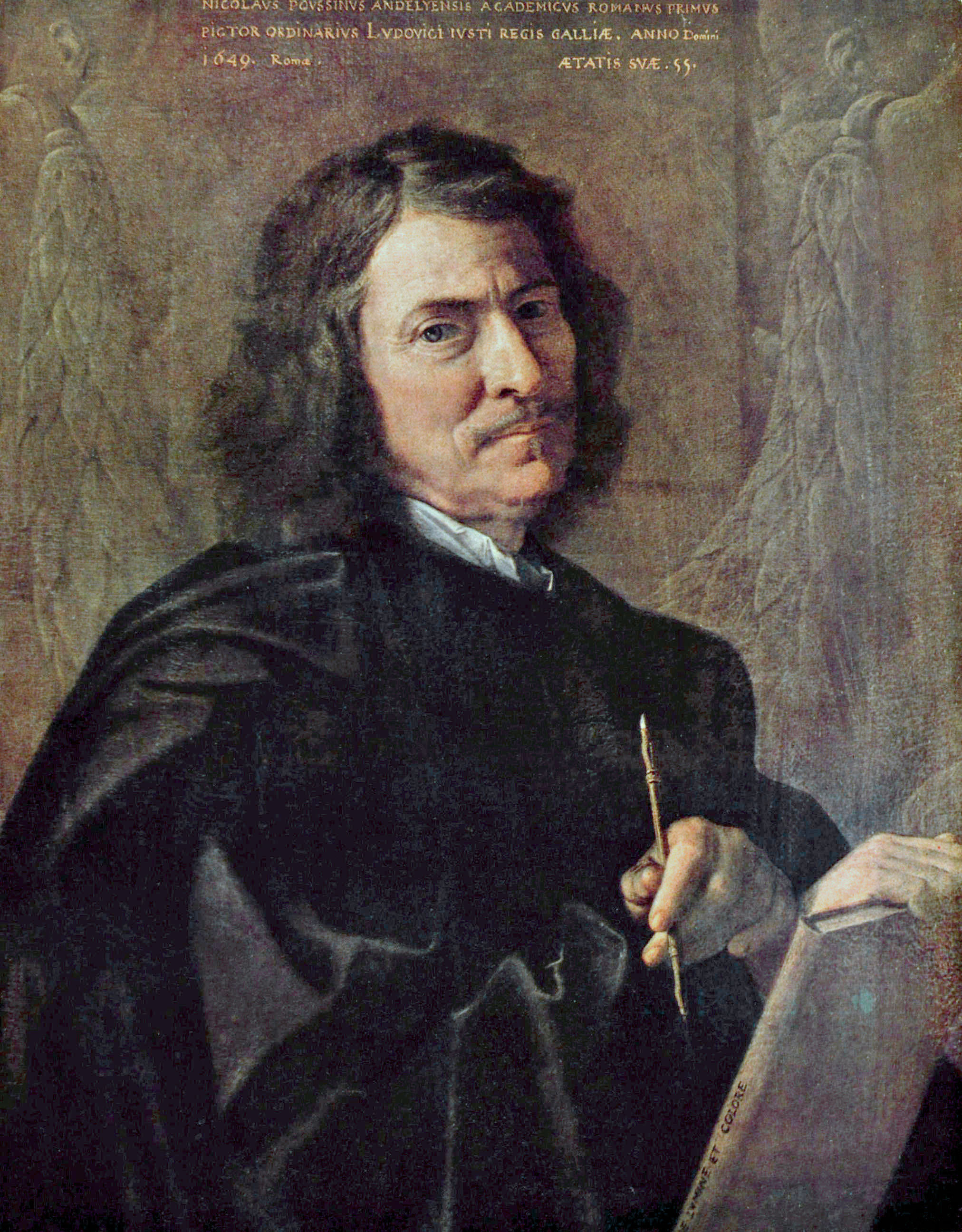
Self-Portrait (1649) by Nicolas Poussin

Self-Portrait is the first self-portrait by Nicolas Poussin, painted in 1649 and dedicated to his patron Jean Pointel. It is signed "Nicolaus Poussinus Andelyensis Academicus Romanus Primus Pictor Ordinarius Ludovici Iusti Regis Galliæ. Anno Domini 1649. Roma. Ætatis Suæ. 55" (Nicolas Poussin, of Les Andelys. Member of the Roman Academy. First painter in ordinary to Louis the Just, king of France. In the Year of Our Lord 1649. In the 55th year of his age"). In his hands is a book by an unknown author showing the title "De lumine et colore" (On light and colour). It was bought for the Prussian state collection in 1821 as part of Edward Solly's collection and is now in the Gemäldegalerie, Berlin.

== See also ==
- List of paintings by Nicolas Poussin
