= Pierre-Philippe Grappin =

French Catholic priest (1738–1833)

Pierre-Philippe Grappin (1 February 1738 – 20 November 1833) was a French Benedictine canon and member of several scholarly societies including the Académie des sciences, belles-lettres et arts de Besançon et de Franche-Comté, of which he was permanent secretary. He was known as Dom Grappin. He became a priest in the Constitutional Church and well known for his correspondence with the abbé Grégoire, published in 1969.

== Life ==
He was born in Ainvelle to a notary. His family lived in Gy, where he later lived for a few years.

Aged eighteen he entered the abbey at Luxeuil, where he made his profession. He became superior of the college at Saint-Ferjeux

In 1768 he published Lettre à l'auteur de l'examen philosophique de la règle de Saint-Benoît ou examen religieux de l'examen philosophique, attacking Dom Cajot, a Benedictine of Saint-Vanne. He competed for various dissertation subjects proposed by the académie de Besançon such as :

- l'origine de la main-morte,
- Histoires des abbayes de Faverney et de Luxeuil,
- Recherches sur les anciennes monnaies, poids et mesures du Comté de Bourgogne., published in octavo in 1782 in Besançon

He was thus admitted to the academy at Besançon where in 1785 he read a historical elegy on Jean Jouffroy, cardinal of Albi. He assisted abbé Grandidier on Histoires d'Alsace.

In 1790–1791, he took the oath to abide by the civil constitution of the clergy, remaining faithful to it to the end. He died in Besançon.

== Works ==
- L'histoire abrégée du comté de Bourgogne, which he had printed in Vesoul (1773) and Besançon (1780)
- L'art de vérifier les dates,
- Notices sur les comtés de Bourgogne
- Notices sur les landgraves de Hesse
- Abrégé du Traité du pouvoir des évêques, 1803
- Almanach historique de Besançon et de Franche-Comté, 1785 and 1786,
- Essais poétiques, 1786,
- Mémoires historiques sur les guerres du XVIeme siecle dans le comté de Bourgogne, 1788,
- Éloge historique de M. l'abbé Grandidier, Strasbourg, 1788
- Mémoire historique où l'on essaie de prouver que le Cardinal de Granvelle n'eut point de part aux troubles des Pays-Bas au XVIeme siecle, 1788.
