= Decree on the goods of the clergy placed at the disposal of the Nation =

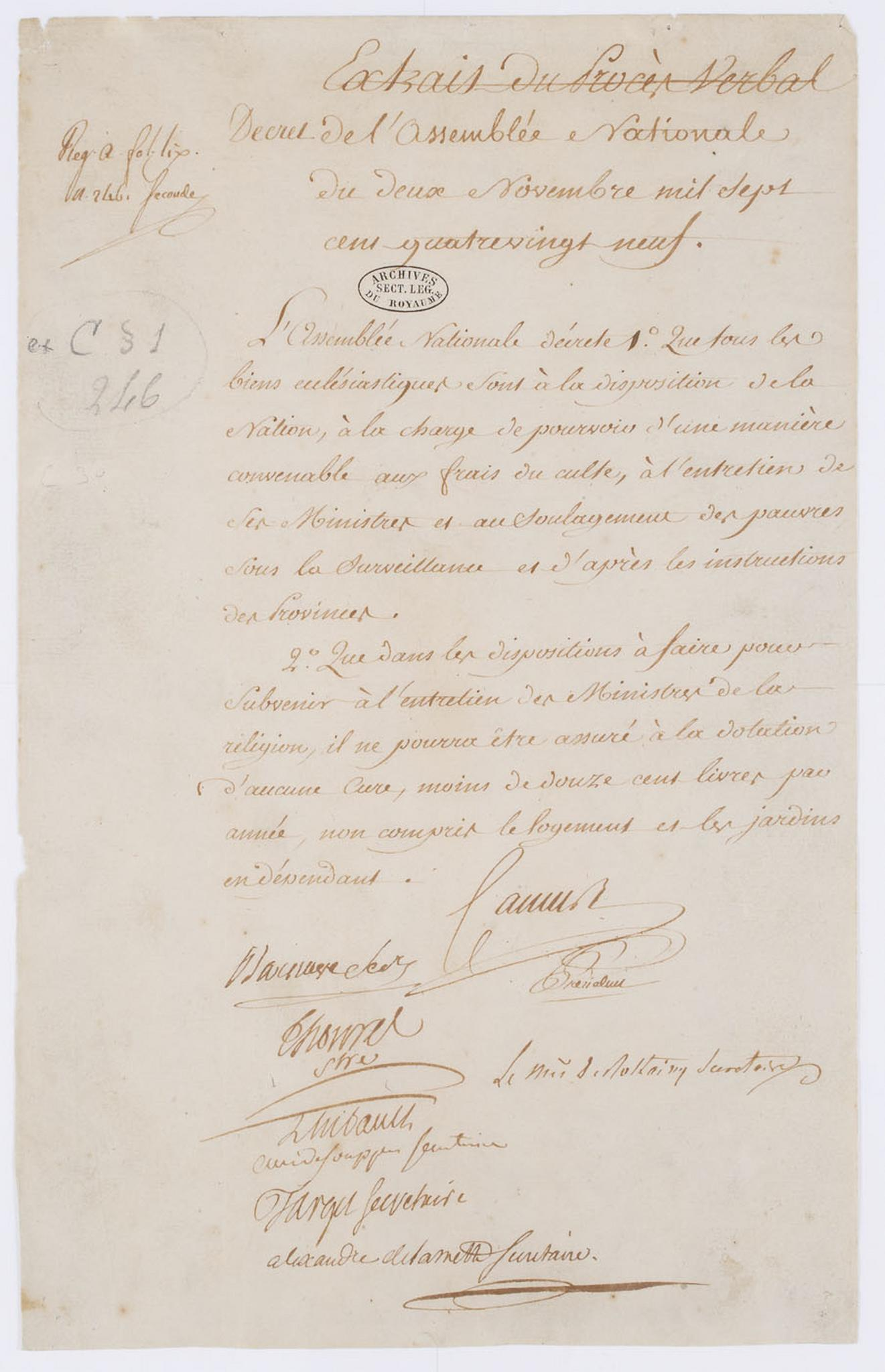
The decree in the Archives nationales.

The decree on the goods of the clergy placed at the disposal of the Nation (French - décret des biens du clergé mis à la disposition de la Nation) was a decree passed by the National Constituent Assembly of France on 2 November 1789, during the French Revolution. Proposed by Talleyrand, bishop of Autun, it was carried by 568 votes against 346.

It forced Roman Catholic clergy to give their lands and goods to the French state to pay its debts. Clergy's belongings and lands became 'biens nationaux' (state goods) and were partly sold off to replenish the state's coffers (assignats). In return the state paid for maintenance of churches and hospitals, poor relief, and other costs incurred for religious purposes, as well as paying priests salaries (initially set at 1200 livres a year, although most - reduced to a 'portion congrue' from tithes - only received 750). Those salaries ceased by another decree of 18 September 1794 suppressing the budget of the Constitutional Church.
