= Eliezer and Rebecca (Poussin, Louvre) =

Blblical painting by Poussin

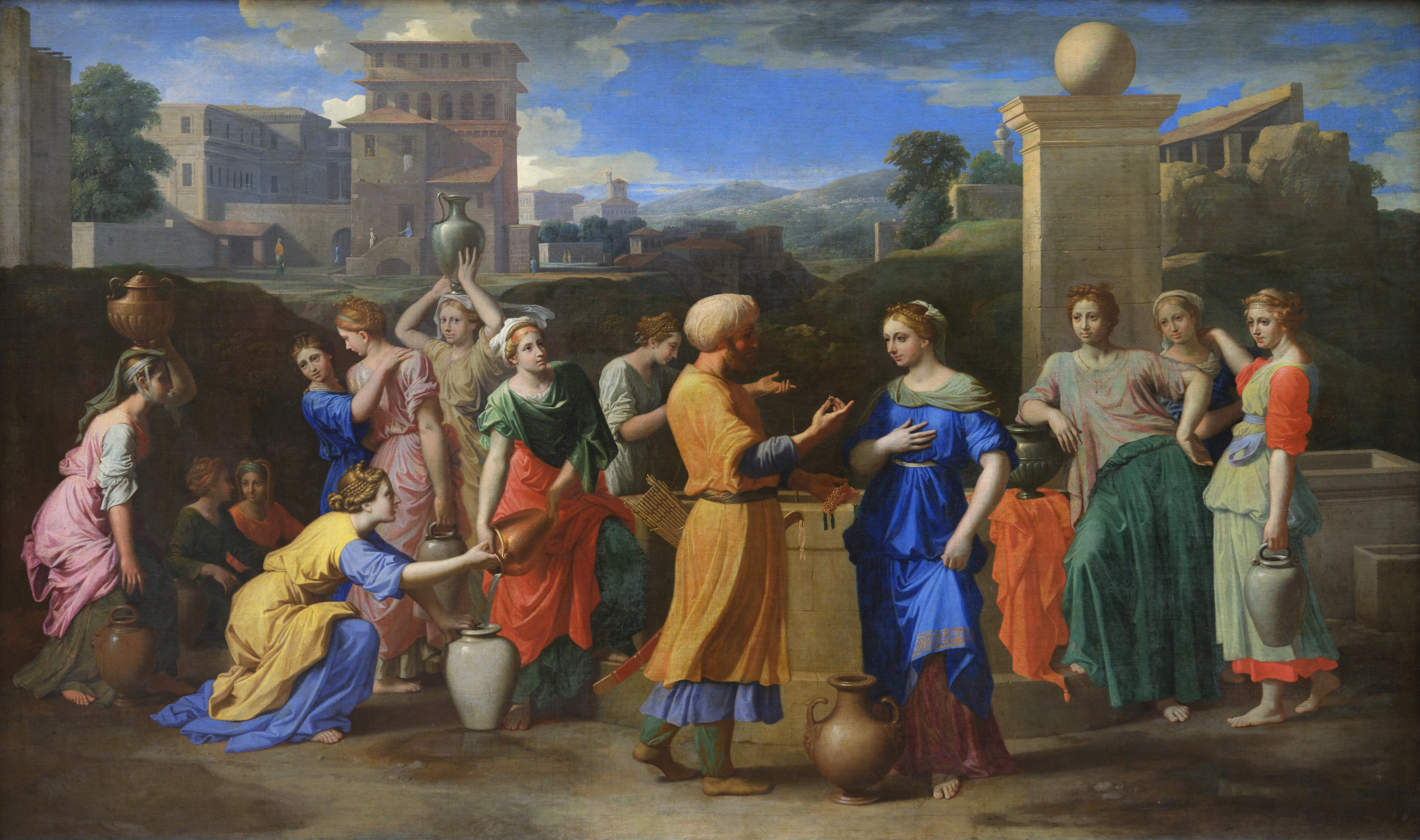
Eliezer and Rebecca, Louvre version

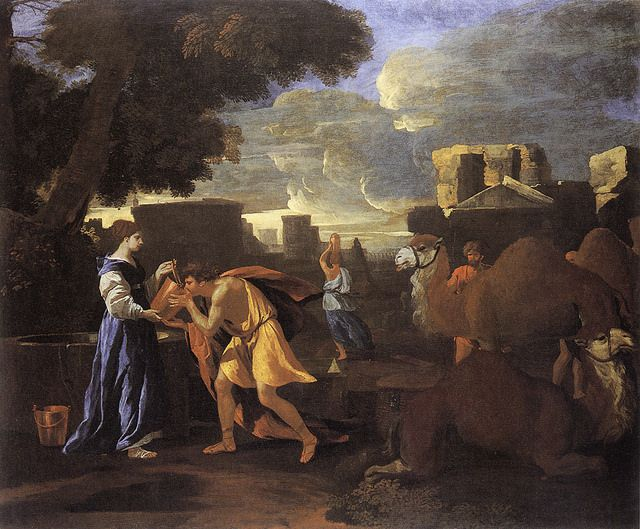
Private collection version

Eliezer and Rebecca (in French Éliézer et Rébecca) or Eliezer Giving Abraham's Presents to Rebecca (Éliézer remet les présents d'Abraham à Rébecca) is an oil-on-canvas paintings by Nicolas Poussin, dating to c.1647–1649, commissioned by silk merchant and banker Jean Pointel and is now in the Louvre. Another similar version is at the Fitzwilliam Museum, whilst another (dated to around 1626 and formerly in Cassiano dal Pozzo's and Denis Mahon's collections) is in a private collection and shows Rebecca quenching Eliezer's thirst rather than Eliezer giving the gifts.

== Production ==
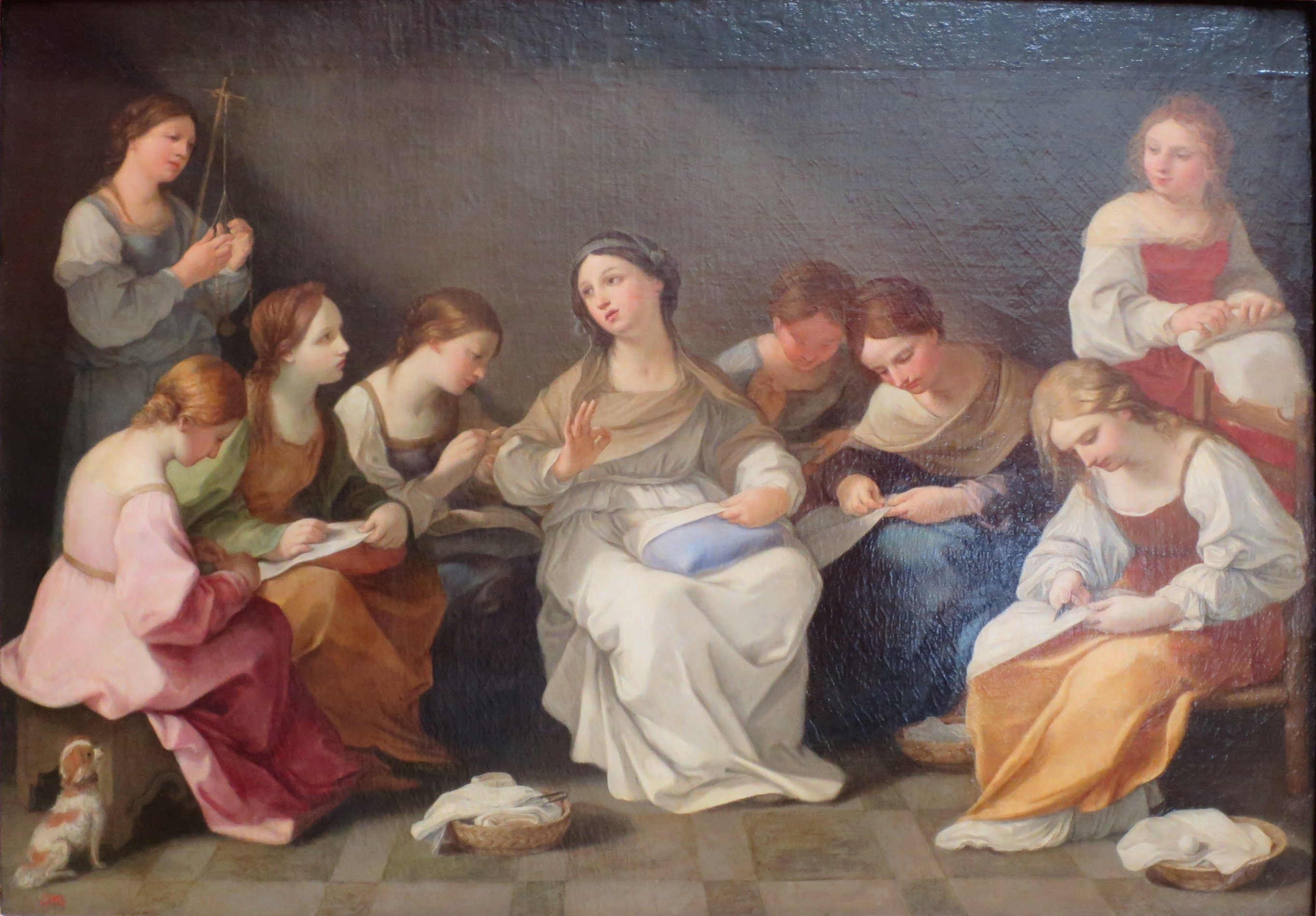
Guido Reni, The Virgin Mary Sewing with Companions, Hermitage Museum.

The work shows Eliezer of Damascus giving Abraham's ring and gifts to Rebecca, who was to marry Abram's son Isaac (Genesis 24, 15–27), and is dated to between 1647 and 1649 by Poussin's biographer André Félibien whilst Pointel was in Rome. He commissioned it to be inspired by Guido Reni's The Virgin Mary Sewing with Companions (Hermitage Museum), which had recently been acquired by Cardinal Mazarin, and asked Poussin to paint him "a painting like it, with several women, in whom one can note different beauties". The painting was highly praised on arrival in Paris – Félibien states "you and I went to see it with a woman we know who was so charmed that she offered Mr Pointel as high a price for it as he liked. But he had such passion for his friend's works that – far from selling it – he did not want to be deprived of it for even a single day".

On Pointel's death in 1660, he owned this and twenty other works by Poussin, with a total value of 1200 livres, according to the posthumous inventory of his possessions drawn up by the painter Philippe de Champaigne. The duc de Richelieu probably acquired it the following year on the dispersal of Pointel's collection, then in December 1665 it, The Seasons and eleven other Poussin works were all acquired by Louis XIV.

On 7 January 1668 de Champaigne gave a talk on the painting to the Académie royale de peinture et de sculpture – at that time in the king's painting cabinet at the Louvre Palace It was recorded as being in the cabinet du billiard in the Petit Appartement du roi at the Palace of Versailles in 1695. It was probably around this time that the painting was cut down at the sides to fit the room's panelling, hanging as a pendent to The Discovery of Moses (Louvre). Its 1703 catalogue entry still had it there, but three years later it was moved into the painting store in the hôtel de la surintendance des bâtiments du roi. In 1719 it was recorded as hanging in Paris after Louis XV moved it there, but it returned to Versailles again, where it was in the painting store in 1760 and until 1792. In 1793 it was moved to Paris for good, when it hung in the opening display of the Louvre as a public gallery and the reopening of Louvre's Grande Galerie in 1799.

== Analysis ==
As well as showing the Old Testament scene itself, the work presents it as a type of the Annunciation to the Virgin Mary. Rebecca's robe is blue (the Virgin Mary's colour) and puts her right hand on her heart to show her acceptance (also done by Mary in many depictions of the Annunciation). The water in the well also alludes to Mary who – for theologians of Poussin's time – was a fountain or in Jean-Pierre Camus's words an "inexhaustible well of the living waters of grace" for Christians. The twelve companions also refer to the twelve stars in the Virgin's Mary's crown. Each has a different reaction to the scene, ranging from indifference to envy and jealousy and from wonder to surprise, and only one of them turns to look at the viewer.

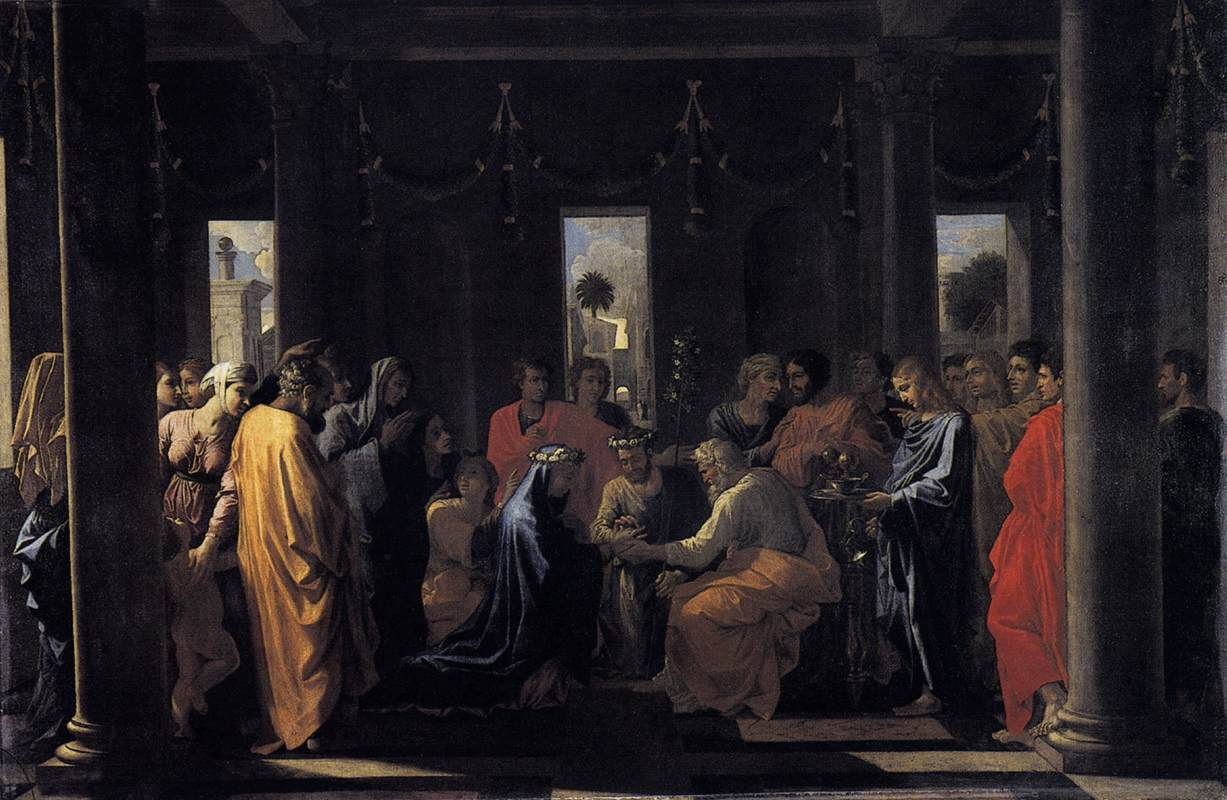
Marriage, second series of The Seven Sacraments, c. 1647–1648.

The works also recall marriage iconography. The year before Poussin had completed the last painting in his Seven Sacraments for Paul Fréart de Chantelou, showing marriage. Many theologians saw Rebecca as the ideal wife, chaste and virtuous, with Eliezer's gifts symbolising the virtues of faith and charity.

The third theme is seen in the column surmounted by a large ball. This represents Fortune and Providence, with the ball (symbolising the eye of God) married to Virtue (represented by the column), showing the meeting of Eliezer and Rebecca as one of the great moments of the Bible in the course of which God's will was made manifest.

== Copies and inspirations ==
Several copies of the work exist, including two partial ones by Jean-Auguste-Dominique Ingres now in the Musée des beaux-arts de Marseille and the Musée Ingres de Montauban. It also inspired Pablo Picasso's Three Women at a Fountain (Museum of Modern Art, New York).

== See also ==
- List of paintings by Nicolas Poussin
