= 2022 in public domain =

The following is a list of creators whose works entered the public domain on 1 January 2022. When copyright expires in a creative work, it enters the public domain. Since copyright terms vary from country to country, the copyright status of a work may not be the same in all countries.

== Countries with life + 70 years ==
With the exception of Belarus (Life + 50 years) and Spain (which has a copyright term of Life + 80 years for creators that died before 1987), a work enters the public domain in Europe 70 years after its creator's death, if it was published during their lifetime. For previously unpublished material, those who publish it first retain the publication rights for 25 years. The list is sorted alphabetically and includes a notable work of the creator's that entered the public domain on 1 January 2022.

Other countries with a copyright term of life + 70 years are Argentina, Brazil, Chile, Ecuador, Uruguay, Peru, Paraguay, Panama, Costa Rica, Nicaragua, Japan, Russia, Indonesia, Israel, Armenia, Burkina Faso, Nigeria, Ivory Coast, Singapore, South Korea, Dominican Republic, Ghana, Madagascar, Mozambique, Senegal, Sri Lanka and Uzbekistan.

Names	Country	Death	Occupation	Notable work
Louis Adamic	United States	4 September 1951	Writer	Dynamite: The Story of Class Violence in America
Bartlett Adamson	Australia	4 November 1951	Journalist, writer, and political activist	
Jyoti Prasad Agarwala	India	17 January 1951	Film director, playwright, writer	Joymoti
Choudhry Rahmat Ali	Pakistan	3 February 1951	Jurist	Pakistan Declaration
Muhammad Ali	India	13 October 1951	Writer	
Egbert Van Alstyne	United States	9 July 1951	Composer	"In the Shade of the Old Apple Tree", "Pretty Baby"
Aram Andonian	Armenia	23 December 1951	Writer	The Memoirs of Naim Bey
Leopold Andrian	Austria	19 November 1951	Writer	
Henry W. Armstrong	United States	28 February 1951	Composer	Sweet Adeline
Numa Ayrinhac	Argentina	23 March 1951	Painter	
Resurrección María de Azkue	Spain	9 November 1951	Writer	
Mohammad-Taqi Bahar	Iran	22 April 1951	Poet	
R. H. Barlow	United States	2 January 1951	Writer, anthropologist	
Sarah Jane Baines	Australia	20 February 1951	Feminist, suffragette, social reformer	
Jacques de Baroncelli	France	12 January 1951	Film director	
Gaspar Agüero Barreras	Cuba	18 May 1951	Pianist, composer	
Pramathesh Barua	India	29 November 1951	Film director, actor, writer	
Daisy Bates	Australia	18 April 1951	Journalist, welfare worker	
Celadet Alî Bedirxan	Turkey	1951	Writer, linguist	
Frank Weston Benson	United States	15 November 1951	Painter	List of works by Frank Weston Benson
Jørgen Bentzon	Denmark	9 July 1951	Composer	
Konstantin Biebl	Czech Republic	12 November 1951	Poet	
Leo Birinski	Germany	23 October 1951	Playwright, screenwriter, film director	
Dorothea Foster Black	Australia	13 September 1951	Painter and printmaker	
Algernon Blackwood	United Kingdom	10 December 1951	Journalist, writer	Incredible Adventures, "The Willows", "The Wendigo" and The Doll and One Other
Francisco Boix	Spain	7 July 1951	Photographer	Photographs of Mauthausen concentration camp
Ivanoe Bonomi	Italy	20 April 1951	Politician	
Stephen Bonsal	United States	8 June 1951	Journalist, writer	
Tadeusz Borowski	Poland	3 July 1951	Writer, journalist	
Herman Charles Bosman	South Africa	14 October 1951	Writer	
Alfred-Alphonse Bottiau	France	25 February 1951	Sculptor	
James Bridie	Scotland	29 January 1951	Playwright, screenwriter, physician	
Hermann Broch	Austria	30 May 1951	Writer	The Sleepwalkers, The Death of Virgil
Gelett Burgess	United States	18 September 1951	Writer	"Purple Cow"
Abraham Cahan	United States	31 August 1951	Writer	The Rise of David Levinsky
Andrew Caldecott	United Kingdom	14 July 1951	Writer and British colonial administrator	
Amy Carmichael	Ireland	18 January 1951	Writer	
John Alden Carpenter	United States	26 April 1951	Composer	
Ethel Carrick	Australia	17 June 1951	Artist	
Émile Chartier	France	2 June 1951	Writer	
Alphonse de Châteaubriant	France	2 May 1951	Writer	The Keynote, La Brière
Peter Cheyney	United Kingdom	26 June 1951	Writer	Lemmy Caution, Slim Callaghan
Ben Chifley	Australia	13 June 1951	Politician	
Cho Ki-chon	North Korea	31 July 1951	Poet	
Gendün Chöphel	Tibet	1951	Writer, poet	
Al Christie	Canada	14 April 1951	Film director	
Halfdan Cleve	Norway	6 April 1951	Composer	
Christabel Cockerell	United Kingdom	18 March 1951	Painter	
Edith Coleman	Australia	3 June 1951	Naturalist	
Gustav Cords	Germany	18 February 1951	Composer	
Cara David	Australia	25 December 1951	Educator, feminist, social reformer	
Wilfrid de Glehn	United Kingdom	11 May 1951	Painter	
Nirupama Devi	India	7 January 1951	Writer	
Enrique Santos Discépolo	Argentina	23 December 1951	Composer, director	
Hans Andrias Djurhuus	Faroe Islands	6 May 1951	Poet, writer	
Lloyd C. Douglas	United States	13 February 1951	Writer, pastor	Magnificent Obsession, The Robe
Georgios Drossinis	Greece	3 January 1951	Writer	
Frank DuMond	United States	6 February 1951	Illustrator, painter	
József Egry	Hungary	1951	Painter	
Mário Eloy	Portugal	5 September 1951	Painter	
Anastasia Eristavi-Khoshtaria	Georgia	1 May 1951	Writer	
John Erskine	United States	2 June 1951	Writer, composer	The Moral Obligation to Be Intelligent
'Abd al-'Aziz Fahmi	Egypt	1951	Poet	
Georgy Fedotov	Russia	1 September 1951	Writer	
Fei Mu	China	31 January 1951	Film director	Spring in a Small Town
Jerzy Fitelberg	United States	25 April 1951	Composer	
Kristo Floqi	Albania	1 July 1951	Playwright, politician	
John Flynn	Australia	5 May 1951	Minister, aviator	
Josef Bohuslav Foerster	Czech Republic	29 May 1951	Composer	List of compositions by Josef Bohuslav Foerster
Robert J. Flaherty	United States	23 July 1951	Filmmaker	Nanook of the North
Pietro Frosini	Italy	2 September 1951	Musician, composer	
Gao Jianfu	China	1951	Painter	
André Gide	France	19 February 1951	Writer	Bibliography of André Gide
Bert Grant	United States	9 May 1951	Composer	
María Grever	Mexico	15 December 1951	Composer	"What a Diff'rence a Day Makes"
René Guenon	France	7 January 1951	Philosopher and Sufi Scholar	The Reign of Quantity and the Signs of the Times
Jacinto Guerrero	Spain	15 September 1951	Composer	
James Norman Hall	United States	5 July 1951	Writer	Mutiny on the Bounty
Ebbe Hamerik	Denmark	12 August 1951	Composer	
Tamiki Hara	Japan	13 March 1951	Writer	Summer Flower
Fumiko Hayashi	Japan	28 June 1951	Writer	Bangiku
Józef Hecht	Poland	19 June 1951	Printmaker, painter	
Sadegh Hedayat	Iran	9 April 1951	Writer, poet	The Blind Owl, The Stray Dog
Thomas N. Heffron	United States	24 May 1951	Film director	
Herman Hupfeld	United States	8 June 1951	Songwriter	"As Time Goes By", "Let's Put Out the Lights (and Go to Sleep)"
Jenő Illés	Hungary	17 October 1951	Film director	
Ernest Ludvig Ipsen	United States	2 November 1951	Painter	
George Jeske	United States	28 October 1951	Film director	
Tor Jonsson	Norway	14 January 1951	Poet	
Gustave-Henri Jossot	France	7 April 1951	Illustrator, painter	
Robert Kahn	Germany	29 May 1951	Composer	
Alfrēds Kalniņš	Latvia	23 December 1951	Composer	
Karl Maria Kaufmann	Germany	6 February 1951	Archeologist	
Kim Dong-in	Korea	5 January 1951	Writer	
Kim Myeong-sun	Korea	22 June 1951	Writer	
Kitawaki Noboru	Japan	18 December 1951	Painter	
Tyra Kleen	Sweden	17 September 1951	Writer	
Georg af Klercker	Sweden	13 November 1951	Film director	South of the Highway
Katarzyna Kobro	Poland	21 February 1951	Avant-garde sculptor	
Alexander Krein	Soviet Union	25 April 1951	Composer	
Kwee Tek Hoay	Indonesia	4 July 1951	Writer	List of works by Kwee Tek Hoay
Constant Lambert	United Kingdom	21 August 1951	Composer	List of compositions by Constant Lambert
Louis Lavelle	France	1 September 1951	Philosopher	
Ernestina Lecuona	Cuba	3 September 1951	Pianist, composer	
Henri-René Lenormand	France	16 February 1951	Playwright	
Sinclair Lewis	United States	10 January 1951	Writer	Main Street, Babbitt, Arrowsmith
J. C. Leyendecker	United States	25 July 1951	Illustrator	The Arrow Collar Man
Heinz von Lichberg	Germany	14 March 1951	Writer	"Lolita"
Ana Aurora do Amaral Lisboa (pt)	Brazil	22 March 1951	Poet	
Benito Lynch	Argentina	23 December 1951	Writer	The Caranchos of Florida, The Englishman of the Bones, The Romance of a Gaucho
Richard Malden	United Kingdom	19 August 1951	Biblical scholar, editor, author of ghost stories	
Carl Gustaf Emil Mannerheim	Finland	27 January 1951	Politician, memoirist	
Homero Manzi	Argentina	3 May 1951	Writer	
Edwin L. Marin	United States	2 May 1951	Film director	
Konstantin Märska	Estonia	30 August 1951	Film director	
Nellie McClung	Canada	1 September 1951	Writer	
Nikolai Medtner	Russia	13 November 1951	Composer	List of compositions by Nikolai Medtner
Oscar Micheaux	United States	25 March 1951	Writer, director	
Hasrat Mohani	India	13 May 1951	Independence activist, poet	
Giuseppe Mulè	Italy	10 September 1951	Composer	
Takashi Nagai	Japan	1 May 1951	Writer	The Bells of Nagasaki
Nam Cao	Vietnam	1951	Writer	
Ștefan Neaga	Moldova	30 May 1951	Composer	Anthem of the Moldavian Soviet Socialist Republic
Ndoc Nikaj	Albania	16 January 1951	Writer	
Ivor Novello	United Kingdom	6 March 1951	Composer	"Keep the Home Fires Burning"
Selim Palmgren	Finland	13 December 1951	Composer, pianist	
Pyotr Pavlenko	Soviet Union	16 June 1951	Writer	
Scott Pembroke	United States	21 February 1951	Film director	
Brian Penton	Australia	24 August 1951	Journalist, novelist	Landtakers
Felix Petyrek	Austria	1 December 1951	Composer	
Andrei Platonov	Soviet Union	5 January 1951	Writer	The Foundation Pit
Ľudmila Podjavorinská	Slovakia	2 March 1951	Writer, poet	
Clara Katharina Pollaczek	Austria	22 July 1951	Writer	
Voydan Popgeorgiev – Chernodrinski	Bulgaria	8 January 1951	Playwright, writer	Macedonian Blood Wedding
George Henry Powell	United Kingdom	3 December 1951	Songwriter	"Pack Up Your Troubles in Your Old Kit-Bag"
Paula von Preradović	Austria	25 May 1951	Writer	National anthem of Austria
James Peter Quinn	Australia	18 February 1951	Painter	
Assen Razcvetnikov	Bulgaria	30 July 1951	Writer	
Godofredo Rangel	Brazil	4 August 1951	Writer, translator	
Gholamreza Rashid-Yasemi	Iran	1951	Poet	
Cattamanchi Ramalinga Reddy	India	24 February 1951	Educator, writer	
Henri Rivière	France	24 August 1951	Painter	
Sigmund Romberg	United States	9 November 1951	Composer	
Phil Rosen	United States	22 October 1951	Film director	
Georges Hanna Sabbagh	France	1951	Painter	
Pedro Salinas	Spain	4 December 1951	Poet	
Harry Schmidt	Germany	7 September 1951	Mathematician	
Artur Schnabel	Austria	15 August 1951	Classical pianist, composer	Artur Schnabel's recordings of Beethoven's piano sonatas
Arnold Schoenberg	Austria; United States	13 July 1951	Composer, music theorist	List of compositions by Arnold Schoenberg
Percival Serle	Australia	16 December 1951	Writer	
Robert Seton-Watson	United Kingdom	25 July 1951	Historian	
Levon Shant	Armenia	29 November 1951	Playwright	
Angelos Sikelianos	Greece	19 June 1951	Poet, playwright	
S. Sylvan Simon	United States	17 May 1951	Film director	
Houcine Slaoui	Morocco	1951	Musician	
John Sloan	United States	7 September 1951	Painter	
Pamela Colman Smith	United Kingdom	18 September 1951	Illustrator	Rider–Waite tarot deck
Henry De Vere Stacpoole	(Republic of Ireland) Ireland	12 April 1951	Writer	The Blue Lagoon
Paul L. Stein	Austria	2 May 1951	Film director	
Arthur Szyk	Poland	13 September 1951	Illustrator	
Abanindranath Tagore	India	5 December 1951	Painter, writer	
Maila Talvio	Finland	6 January 1951	Writer	
Mary Tannahill	United States	21 June 1951	Painter	
Nikoghayos Tigranian	Armenia	17 February 1951	Composer	
Timrava	Slovakia	27 November 1951	Writer	
Julio Torres Mayorga	Colombia	9 January 1951	Musician and songwriter	"Los Camarones"
Marcel Tournier	France	8 May 1951	Composer	
Walter Trier	Germany	8 July 1951	Illustrator	Illustration of Emil and the Detectives and Lilliput covers
Manuel Ugarte	Argentina	1951	Writer	
Jan Valtin	Germany	14 January 1951	Writer, covert agent	
Maxence Van der Meersch	France	14 January 1951	Writer	Bodies and Souls
Vsevolod Vishnevsky	Soviet Union	28 February 1951	Playwright	
Henrik Visnapuu	Estonia	3 April 1951	Poet	
Will Vodery	United States	18 November 1951	Composer	
Volodymyr Vynnychenko	Ukraine	6 March 1951	Writer, playwright	
Richard Wallace	United States	3 November 1951	Film director	
Jean-Jacques Waltz	France	10 June 1951	Illustrator	
Nik Welter	Luxembourg	13 July 1951	Writer	
Ludwig Wittgenstein	Austria; United Kingdom	29 April 1951	Philosopher	Tractatus Logico-Philosophicus, Philosophical Investigations
Wols	Germany	1 September 1951	Painter, photographer	
Gregorios Xenopoulos	Greece	14 January 1951	Writer	
Miyamoto Yuriko	Japan	21 January 1951	Writer	
Corrado Zoli	Italy	8 December 1951	Writer	
Hermynia Zur Mühlen	Austria	20 March 1951	Writer, translator	

== Countries with life + 60 years ==
In Bangladesh, India, and Venezuela a work enters the public domain 60 years after the creator's death.

Names	Country	Death	Occupation	Notable work
Fani Badayuni	India	27 August 1961	Poet	
Chandradhar Barua	India	1 December 1961	Poet, novelist	
Charu Chandra Bhattacharya	India	26 August 1961	Scientific writer	
Roussan Camille	Haiti	7 December 1961	Poet, journalist	
Joanna Cannan	United Kingdom	22 April 1961	Writer, detective novelist	
Louis-Ferdinand Céline	France	1 July 1961	Novelist, pamphleteer	
Blaise Cendrars	Switzerland	21 January 1961	Novelist, poet	
Bhupendranath Datta	India	1 December 1961	Poet, novelist	
Hilda Doolittle	United States	27 September 1961	Poet, novelist, memoirist	
Mazo de la Roche	Canada	12 July 1961	Novelist	
Gertrude Minnie Faulding	United Kingdom	26 December 1961	Children's writer and novelist	
Jessie Redmon Fauset	United States	30 April 1961	Editor, writer, educator	
Olga Forsh	Russia	17 July 1961	Dramatist, novelist, memoirist	
Leonhard Frank	Germany	18 August 1961	Writer	
Dashiell Hammett	United States	10 January 1961	Crime writer, screenwriter	
Hazel Heald	United States	4 February 1961	Pulp fiction writer	
Ernest Hemingway	United States	2 July 1961	Novelist	
George S. Kaufman	United States	2 June 1961	Dramatist, critic	
Oliver Onions	United Kingdom	9 April 1961	Novelist, ghost story writer	
Arata Osada	Japan	18 April 1961	Professor	Children of the A-Bomb: Testament of the Boys and Girls of Hiroshima
Nalam Krishna Rao	India	1961	Magazine editor	
E. Arnot Robertson	United Kingdom	18 March 1961	Novelist	
Mihail Sadoveanu	Romania	19 October 1961	Novelist	
Peyami Safa	Turkey	15 June 1961	Journalist, writer	
Saralabala Sarkar	India	1 December 1961	Novelist	
Sachin Sengupta	India	5 March 1961	Playwright	
R. P. Sethu Pillai	India	25 April 1961	Lawyer, professor	
Nalin Vilochan Sharma	India	12 September 1961	Professor	
Clark Ashton Smith	United States	14 August 1961	Writer	
Vattikota Alwar Swamy	India	5 February 1961	Human rights activist, journalist	Jailu Lopala
Rathindranath Tagore	India	3 June 1961	Agronomist	
Dorothy Thompson	United States	30 January 1961	Journalist	
James Thurber	United States	2 November 1961	Humorist	
Suryakant Tripathi	India	15 October 1961	Poet, short story writer	Hindi translation of Anandmath
William Troy	United States	26 May 1961	Writer, educator	

== Countries with life + 50 years ==
In most countries of Africa and Asia, as well as Belarus, Bolivia, Canada, New Zealand, Egypt and Uruguay, a work enters the public domain 50 years after its creator's death.

Names	Country	Death	Occupation	Notable work
Kate Aitken	Canada	11 December 1971	Broadcaster	Books
Ya'qoub Al-Oudat	Jordan	23 September 1971	Poet, writer	Biography of Mustafa Wahbi et-Tull
John Beaglehole	New Zealand	10 October 1971	Historian	The Life of Captain James Cook
Pacho Benavides	Colombia	18 December 1971	Musician, composer	"Veleñita"
James Boswell	New Zealand	15 April 1971	Artist	The Artist's Dilemma
John W. Campbell	United States	11 July 1971	Author and editor	Who Goes There?
Brock Chisholm	Canada	4 February 1971	Psychiatrist	Works
August Derleth	United States	4 July 1971	Writer	August Derleth bibliography
Abd El-Razzak El-Sanhuri	Egypt	21 July 1971	Legal scholar	Al-Waseet fil Qanun
Gerardo Gombau	Spain	13 December 1971	Composer	
Helmy Halim	Egypt	18 November 1971	Film director	Our Beautiful Days
Samuel Alfred Haynes	Belize	1971	Civil rights activist, poet	Land of the Free
Usmar Ismail	Indonesia	2 January 1971	Film director	Darah dan Doa
Ub Iwerks	United States	1 July 1971	Cartoonist, film producer	Oswald the Lucky Rabbit, Mickey Mouse, Flip the Frog
Abdul Jabbar Jomard	Iraq	30 November 1971	Historian, Poet	
Paul Lévy	France	15 December 1971	Mathematician	Calcul des Probabilités
C. C. MacApp	United States	15 November 1971	SF author	"The Mercurymen"
Reginald Alec Martin	United Kingdom	27 June 1971	Children's writer	Kemlo
R. A. K. Mason	New Zealand	13 July 1971	Poet	Works
Janka Maŭr	Belarus	3 August 1971	Children's writer, translator	
Ghulam Rasool Mehr	Pakistan	16 November 1971	Scholar	Books
Jim Morrison	United States	3 July 1971	Musician	The Doors discography
Ogden Nash	United States	19 May 1971	Poet	Bibliography of Ogden Nash
Andre Ryder	Greece; Egypt	5 March 1971	Musician	
Tawfīq Sāyigh	Palestine	1971	Poet	
Stevie Smith	United Kingdom	7 March 1971	Poet, writer	Works
Igor Stravinsky	Russia	6 April 1971	Composer	List of compositions by Igor Stravinsky
Frank Underhill	Canada	16 September 1971	Historian	Upper Canadian Politics in the 1850s
Philip Wylie	United States	25 October 1971	Author	Gladiator
David Law (cartoonist)	Scotland	30 April 1971	Cartoonist	Dennis the Menace and Gnasher, Beryl the Peril

== Australia ==
In 2004 copyright in Australia changed from a "plus 50" law to a "plus 70" law, in line with America and the European Union. But the change was not made retroactive (unlike the 1995 change in the European Union which brought some British authors back into copyright, especially those who died from 1925 to 1944). Hence the work of an author who died before 1955 is normally in the public domain in Australia; but the copyright of authors was extended to 70 years after death for those who died in 1955 or later, and no more Australian authors would come out of copyright until 1 January 2026 (those who died in 1955).

== Countries with life + 80 years ==
Spain, Colombia, and Equatorial Guinea have a copyright term of life + 80 years. For Spain this is for creators who died before 1987. The list is sorted alphabetically and includes a notable work of the creator's that entered the public domain on 1 January 2022.

Names	Country	Death	Occupation	Notable work
Prudenci Bertrana	Spain	21 November 1941	Writer	Entre la terra i els núvols
J. Stuart Blackton	United Kingdom; United States	13 August 1941	Cartoonist, film producer and director	Humorous Phases of Funny Faces
Henry Justice Ford	United Kingdom	1941	Artist and illustrator	Lang's Fairy Books
James Joyce	Ireland	13 January 1941	Writer	Ulysses, Dubliners and Finnegans Wake
José Fernández del Villar	Spain	2 April 1941	Playwright	Plays
Hugh Walpole	United Kingdom	1 June 1941	Author	Rogue Herries, The Cathedral and The Dark Forest
Virginia Woolf	United Kingdom	28 March 1941	Author	Mrs Dalloway, Orlando and The Waves

== United States ==
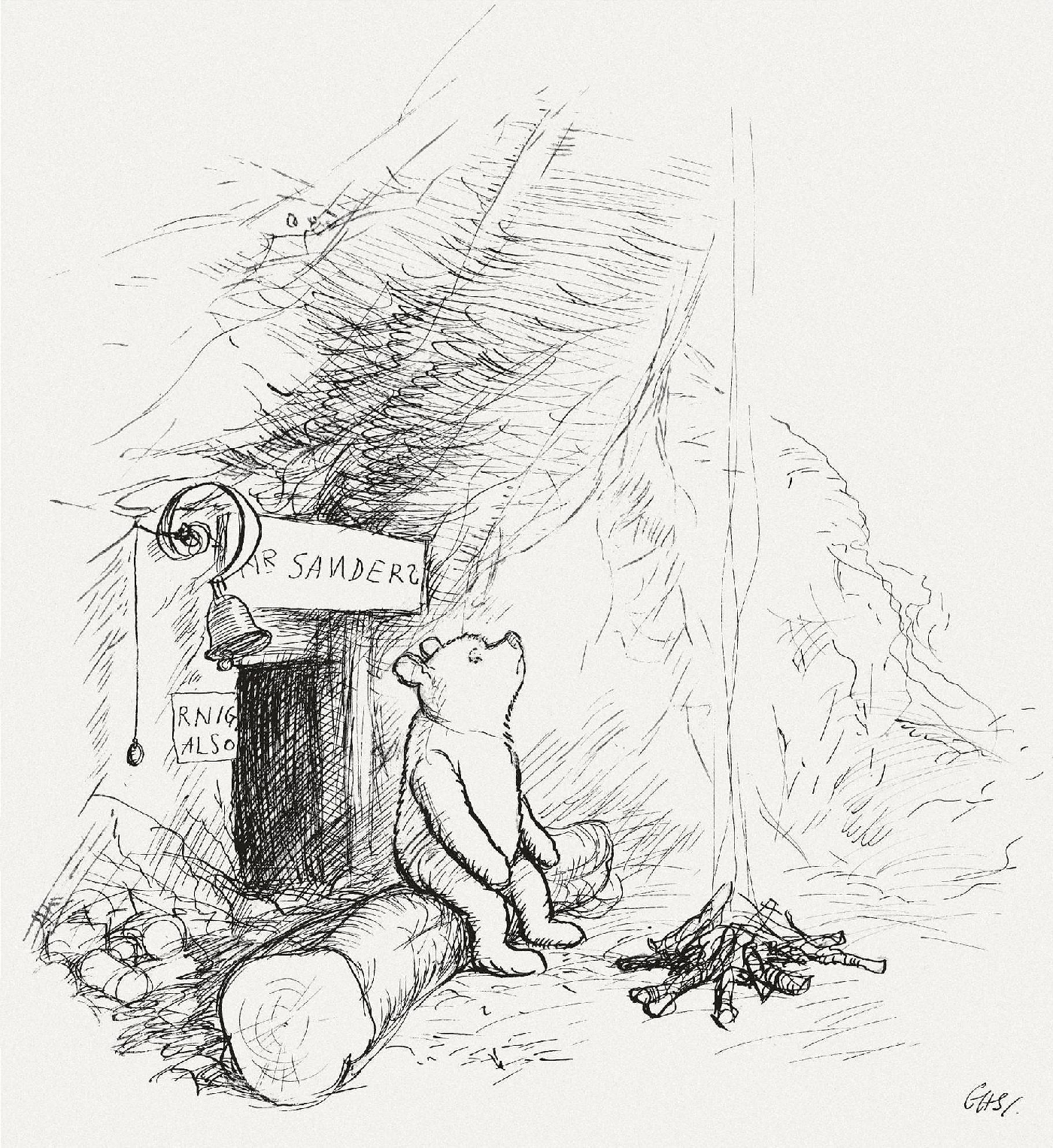
One of the most notable works to enter the public domain in the United States in 2022 was Winnie-the-Pooh by A. A. Milne, introducing its titular bear character.

Under the Music Modernization Act, tens of thousands of sound recordings that were published before 1923 entered the public domain on 1 January 2022. The Library of Congress says that this will result in "Increased public and online access to previously unavailable recordings and expanded opportunities to explore the earliest days of our sound recording heritage." The sound recordings that entered the public domain under the MMA included performances by Mamie Smith, Ethel Waters, Sophie Tucker, Jelly Roll Morton, Vess L. Ossman, Bert Williams, William Murray, Harry Lauder, Enrico Caruso, Pablo Casals, Sergei Rachmaninoff, Edward "Kid" Ory, Europe's Society Orchestra, the Sousa Band, Jules Levy, Anna Chandler, Fanny Brice, Marion Harris, Nora Bayes, Al Jolson, John Steel, Joe Schenck, and Peerless Quartet. Sound recordings that were first published in 1923 or later would not enter the public domain until 100 years after their respective dates of publication.

Under the Copyright Term Extension Act, sheet music published in 1926 entered the public domain, including the compositions of "Bye Bye Blackbird", King Oliver's song "Snag It", Jelly Roll Morton's "Black Bottom Stomp", George Gershwin's song "Someone to Watch Over Me", "Are You Lonesome Tonight?", and "Ke Kali Nei Au" (later known as the "Hawaiian Wedding Song").

Additionally, all books published in 1926, films released in 1926, and other works published in 1926 entered the public domain in 2022. Unpublished works by authors who died in 1951 also entered the public domain.

Notable books entering the public domain in the United States included A. A. Milne's Winnie-the-Pooh, Ernest Hemingway's The Sun Also Rises, Dorothy Parker's first collection of poems Enough Rope, Langston Hughes' The Weary Blues, T. E. Lawrence's The Seven Pillars of Wisdom (later adapted into the film Lawrence of Arabia), Felix Salten's book Bambi, a Life in the Woods, Kahlil Gibran's Sand and Foam, Agatha Christie's The Murder of Roger Ackroyd, Edna Ferber's Show Boat, William Faulkner's first novel Soldiers' Pay, Willa Cather's My Mortal Enemy, D. H. Lawrence's The Plumed Serpent, H. L. Mencken's Notes on Democracy, and Franz Kafka's The Castle in its original German. The character Mary Poppins also entered the public domain through her first short story, "Mary Poppins and the Match Men".

Notable films entering the public domain included For Heaven's Sake starring Harold Lloyd, Battling Butler with Buster Keaton, Rudolph Valentino's final film The Son of the Sheik, The Temptress with Greta Garbo, Moana (a docufiction filmed in Samoa), the German expressionist classic Faust, So This Is Paris (based on the play Le Réveillon), Don Juan (the first feature film to use the Vitaphone sound system), The Cohens and Kellys (a subject of the copyright lawsuit Nichols v. Universal), and the Western film The Winning of Barbara Worth.

In 2022 Théâtre D'opéra Spatial was created and became the first AI-generated artwork to win a big art price. However, the United States Copyright Office declined to grant it a copyright status because it was "predominantly not made by humans", allowing it to automatically fall in the public domain.

== Worldwide ==
Minecraft’s End Poem written by Julian Gough was released into the public domain under Creative Commons CC0 1.0.

Kevin Rose announced that all his Moonbird NFTs will enter the public domain. In April 2024 they announced they were going to reinstate the copyright on the NFTs.

== See also ==
- List of American films of 1926
- List of countries' copyright lengths
- Public Domain Day
- Creative Commons
- Public Domain
- Over 300 public domain authors available in Wikisource (any language), with descriptions from Wikidata
- 1950 in literature, 1960 in literature, 1971 in literature
