= 2032 in public domain =

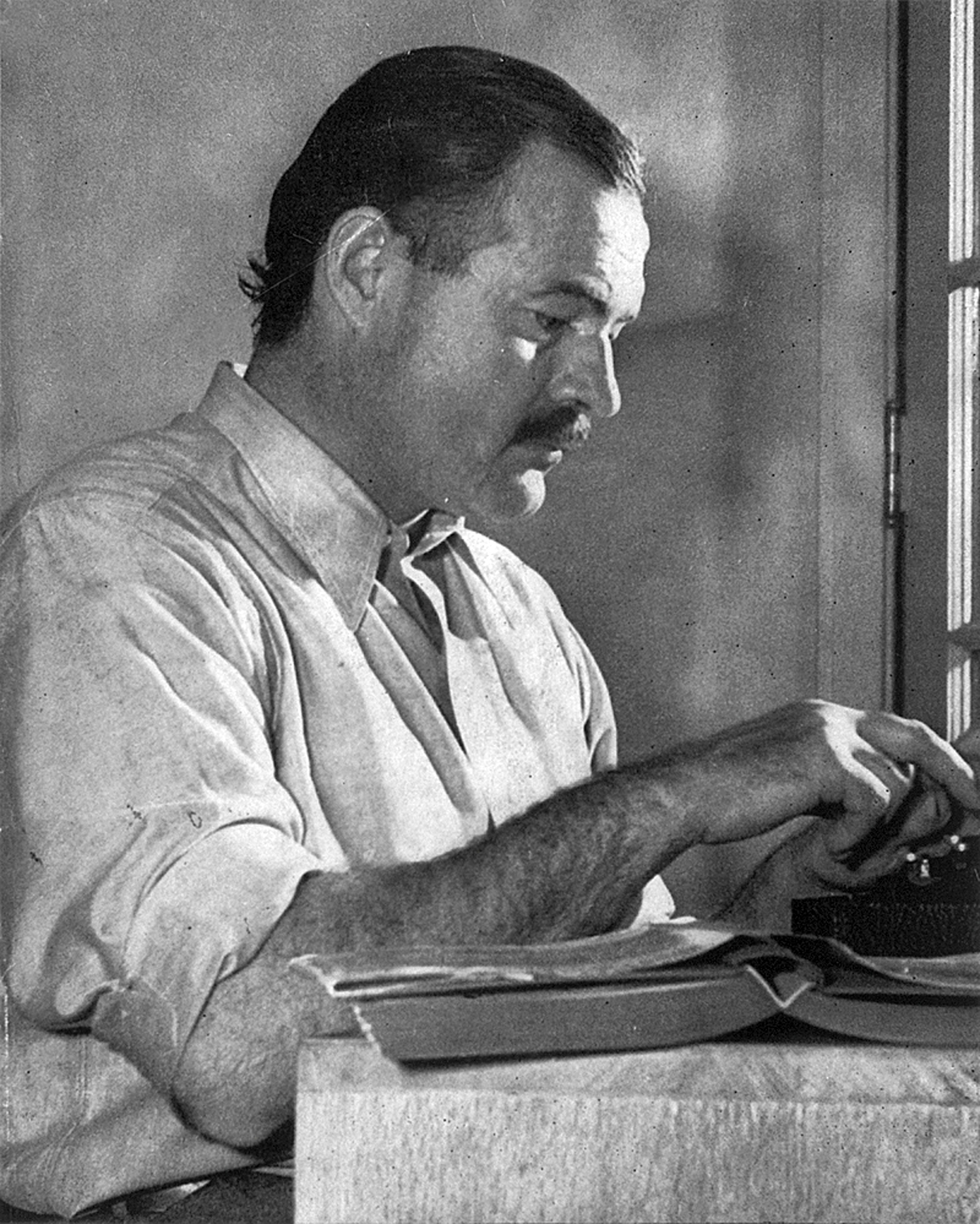
The literature of Ernest Hemingway will enter the public domain in Europe in 2032, at a time when much of it will remain under copyright in his native United States.

When a work's copyright expires, it enters the public domain. Since laws vary globally, the copyright status of some works are not uniform. The following is a list of creators whose works enter the public domain in 2032 under the most common copyright regimes, assuming no further extensions to copyright terms become law in the interim.

== Countries with life + 70 years ==
Except for Belarus (Life + 50 years) and Spain (which has a copyright term of Life + 80 years for creators that died before 1988), a work enters the public domain in Europe 70 years after the creator's death, if it was published during the creator's lifetime. In addition, several other countries have a limit of 70 years. The list is sorted alphabetically and includes a notable work of the creator.

Names	Country	Death	Occupation	Notable work
Zakariyya Ahmad	Egypt	15 February 1961	Musician	Ana Fi Intizarak
Fani Badayuni	India	27 August 1961	Poet	
Chandradhar Barua	India	1 December 1961	Poet, novelist	
Charu Chandra Bhattacharya	India	26 August 1961	Scientific writer	
Roussan Camille	Haiti	7 December 1961	Poet, journalist	Assaut à la Nuit
Joanna Cannan	United Kingdom	22 April 1961	Writer, detective novelist	
Louis-Ferdinand Céline	France	1 July 1961	Novelist, pamphleteer	Death on Credit, Castle to Castle
Blaise Cendrars	Switzerland	21 January 1961	Novelist, poet	Moravagine
Bhupendranath Datta	India	1 December 1961	Poet, novelist	
Hilda Doolittle	United States	27 September 1961	Poet, novelist, memoirist	
Mazo de la Roche	Canada	12 July 1961	Novelist	Jalna novel series
Gertrude Minnie Faulding	United Kingdom	26 December 1961	Children's writer and novelist	
Jessie Redmon Fauset	United States	30 April 1961	Editor, writer, educator	Plum Bun: A Novel Without a Moral
Olga Forsh	Russia	17 July 1961	Dramatist, novelist, memoirist	
Leonhard Frank	Germany	18 August 1961	Writer	
Dashiell Hammett	United States	10 January 1961	Crime writer, screenwriter	Various detective novels and short stories
Hazel Heald	United States	4 February 1961	Pulp fiction writer	
Ernest Hemingway	United States	2 July 1961	Novelist	The Sun Also Rises, For Whom the Bell Tolls, The Old Man and the Sea, and other books
Carl Jung	Switzerland	6 June 1961	Psychiatrist	Over 20 publications relating to analytical and other psychology
George S. Kaufman	United States	2 June 1961	Dramatist, critic	Of Thee I Sing, You Can't Take It with You
Patrick MacDonogh	Ireland	1961	Poet	Over the Water
Oliver Onions	United Kingdom	9 April 1961	Novelist, ghost story writer	Widdershins
Arata Osada	Japan	18 April 1961	Professor	Children of the A-Bomb: Testament of the Boys and Girls of Hiroshima
Nalam Krishna Rao	India	1961	Magazine editor	
E. Arnot Robertson	United Kingdom	18 March 1961	Novelist	
Mihail Sadoveanu	Romania	19 October 1961	Novelist	
Peyami Safa	Turkey	15 June 1961	Journalist, writer	
Saralabala Sarkar	India	1 December 1961	Novelist	
R. A. Schwaller de Lubicz	France	7 December 1961	Egyptologist, mystic	The Temple In Man, Esoterism and Symbol
Sachin Sengupta	India	5 March 1961	Playwright	
R. P. Sethu Pillai	India	25 April 1961	Lawyer, professor	
Nalin Vilochan Sharma	India	12 September 1961	Professor	
Clark Ashton Smith	United States	14 August 1961	Writer	Clark Ashton Smith bibliography
Vattikota Alwar Swamy	India	5 February 1961	Human rights activist, journalist	Jailu Lopala
Rathindranath Tagore	India	3 June 1961	Agronomist	
Dorothy Thompson	United States	30 January 1961	Journalist	
James Thurber	United States	2 November 1961	Humorist	
Suryakant Tripathi	India	15 October 1961	Poet, short story writer	Hindi translation of Anandmath
William Troy	United States	26 May 1961	Writer, educator	
Bayram al-Tunisi	Egypt	5 January 1961	Poet	Ana Fi Intizarak

== Countries with life + 60 years ==
In Bangladesh, India, and Venezuela a work enters the public domain 60 years after the creator's death.

Names	Country	Death	Occupation	Notable work
Kate Aitken	Canada	11 December 1971	Broadcaster	Books
Ya'qoub Al-Oudat	Jordan	23 September 1971	Poet, writer	Biography of Mustafa Wahbi et-Tull
John Beaglehole	New Zealand	10 October 1971	Historian	The Life of Captain James Cook
James Boswell	New Zealand	15 April 1971	Artist	The Artist's Dilemma
John W. Campbell	United States	11 July 1971	Author and editor	Who Goes There?
Brock Chisholm	Canada	4 February 1971	Psychiatrist	Works
August Derleth	United States	4 July 1971	Writer	August Derleth bibliography
Abd El-Razzak El-Sanhuri	Egypt	21 July 1971	Legal scholar	Al-Waseet fil Qanun
Gerardo Gombau	Spain	13 December 1971	Composer	
Helmy Halim	Egypt	18 November 1971	Film director	Our Beautiful Days
Samuel Alfred Haynes	Belize	1971	Civil rights activist, poet	Land of the Free
Usmar Ismail	Indonesia	2 January 1971	Film director	Darah dan Doa
Ub Iwerks	United States	1 July 1971	Cartoonist, film producer	Oswald the Lucky Rabbit, Mickey Mouse, Flip the Frog
Abdul Jabbar Jomard	Iraq	30 November 1971	Historian, Poet	
Paul Lévy	France	15 December 1971	Mathematician	Calcul des Probabilités
C. C. MacApp	United States	15 November 1971	SF author	"The Mercurymen"
Reginald Alec Martin	United Kingdom	27 June 1971	Children's writer	Kemlo
R. A. K. Mason	New Zealand	13 July 1971	Poet	Works
Janka Maŭr	Belarus	3 August 1971	Children's writer, translator	
Ghulam Rasool Mehr	Pakistan	16 November 1971	Scholar	Books
Jim Morrison	United States	3 July 1971	Musician, Poet	The Doors discography
Ogden Nash	United States	19 May 1971	Poet	Bibliography of Ogden Nash
Andre Ryder	Greece; Egypt	5 March 1971	Musician	
Tawfīq Sāyigh	Palestine	1971	Poet	
Stevie Smith	United Kingdom	7 March 1971	Poet, writer	Works
Igor Stravinsky	Russia	6 April 1971	Composer	List of compositions by Igor Stravinsky
Frank Underhill	Canada	16 September 1971	Historian	Upper Canadian Politics in the 1850s
Philip Wylie	United States	25 October 1971	Author	Gladiator

== Countries with life + 50 years ==
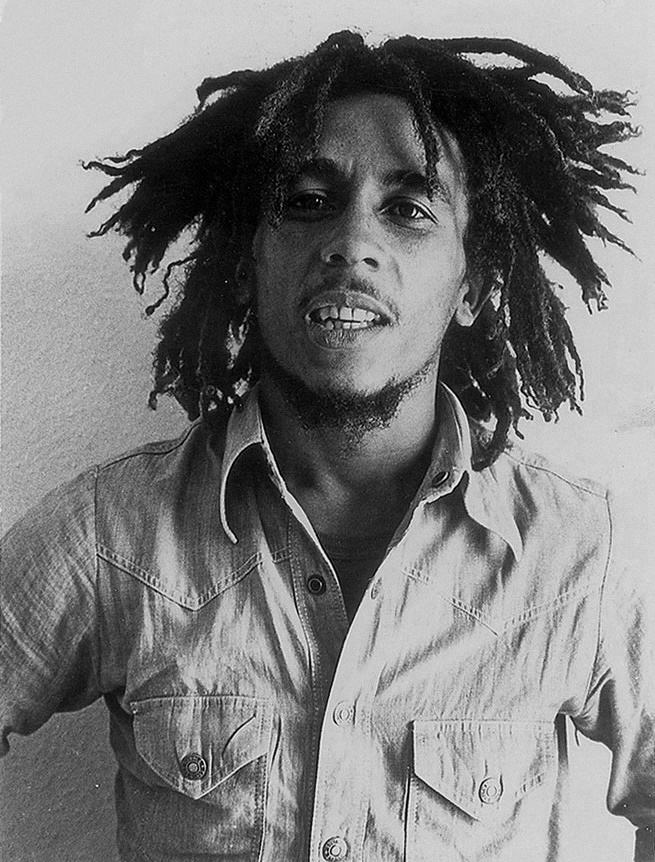
All songs by Bob Marley will enter the public domain in most of Africa and Asia in 2032.

In most countries of Africa and Asia, as well as Belarus, Bolivia, New Zealand, Egypt and Uruguay, a work enters the public domain 50 years after the creator's death.

Names	Country	Death	Occupation	Notable work
Nelson Algren	United States	9 May 1981	Novelist	The Man with the Golden Arm
Enid Bagnold	United Kingdom	31 March 1981	Writer	National Velvet
Gwendolyn B. Bennett	United States	30 May 1981	Writer, artist	"To a Dark Girl"
Carol Ryrie Brink	United States	15 August 1981	Writer	Caddie Woodlawn
Christy Brown	Ireland	7 September 1981	Writer, painter	My Left Foot
Pedro García Cabrera	Spain	20 March 1981	Poet	
Mary Coyle Chase	United States	20 October 1981	Playwright	Harvey
A. J. Cronin	United Kingdom	6 January 1981	Novelist	The Citadel
Bosley Crowther	United States	7 March 1981	Film critic	
Lanza del Vasto	Italy	5 January 1981	Philosopher, poet, activist	
Robert Garioch	United Kingdom	26 April 1981	Poet	
David Garnett	United Kingdom	17 February 1981	Novelist	
Digby George Gerahty	United Kingdom	6 November 1981	Novelist	Elephant Walk
Uri Zvi Grinberg	Israel	8 May 1981	Poet	
Cynthia Harnett	United Kingdom	25 October 1981	Children's book writer	The Wool-Pack, The Load of Unicorn
Rayner Heppenstall	United Kingdom	23 May 1981	Writer	
Pamela Hansford Johnson	United Kingdom	18 June 1981	Poet, novelist, playwright, literary and social critic	
D. F. Jones	United Kingdom	1 April 1981	Science fiction writer	Colossus
Charles Eric Maine	United Kingdom	30 November 1981	Science fiction writer	
Bob Marley	Jamaica	11 May 1981	Musician	Discography
Eugenio Montale	Italy	12 September 1981	Poet	
Mounir Mourad	Egypt	17 October 1981	Musician	Qadi al-Belaj
John Pascal	United States	7 January 1981	Playwright, screenwriter, author, journalist	
Eleanor Perry	United States	14 March 1981	Writer	
Josep Pla	Spain	23 April 1981	Journalist, writer	Life Embitters
Normand Poirier	United States	3 February 1981	Newspaper editor, journalist, essayist	
Ahmed Rami	Egypt	5 June 1981	Poet	Rubaiyat of Omar Khayyam
Lobsang Rampa	United Kingdom	23 January 1981	Writer	The Third Eye
Amber Reeves	New Zealand, United Kingdom	26 December 1981	Scholar, feminist, novelist	
Denys Rhodes	United Kingdom	30 October 1981	Novelist	The Syndicate
Clive Sansom	United Kingdom	29 March 1981	Poet, playwright	The Witnesses, The Golden Unicorn
William Saroyan	United States	18 May 1981	Novelist, dramatist	Bibliography
Zerna Sharp	United States	17 June 1981	Writer, educator	Dick and Jane
Nan Shepard	United Kingdom	23 February 1981	Novelist, poet	The Living Mountain
Riad Al Sunbati	Egypt	10 September 1981	Musician	Rubaiyat of Omar Khayyam, Al-Atlal
C. P. Taylor	United Kingdom	9 December 1981	Playwright	
Gwyn Thomas	Wales	13 April 1981	Novelist, broadcaster	
Philip Toynbee	United Kingdom	15 June 1981	Novelist, journalist	Pantaloon
Alec Waugh	United Kingdom	3 September 1981	Novelist	

== Countries with life + 80 years ==
Spain has a copyright term of life + 80 years for creators that died before 1988. In Colombia and Equatorial Guinea, a work enters the public domain 80 years after the creator's death.

Names	Country	Death	Occupation	Notable work
Louis Adamic	United States	4 September 1951	Writer	Dynamite: The Story of Class Violence in America
Bartlett Adamson	Australia	4 November 1951	Journalist, writer, and political activist	
Jyoti Prasad Agarwala	India	17 January 1951	Film director, playwright, writer	Joymoti
Choudhry Rahmat Ali	Pakistan	3 February 1951	Jurist	Pakistan Declaration
Muhammad Ali	India	13 October 1951	Writer	
Egbert Van Alstyne	United States	9 July 1951	Composer	"In the Shade of the Old Apple Tree", "Pretty Baby"
Aram Andonian	Armenia	23 December 1951	Writer	The Memoirs of Naim Bey
Leopold Andrian	Austria	19 November 1951	Writer	
Henry W. Armstrong	United States	28 February 1951	Composer	Sweet Adeline
Numa Ayrinhac	Argentina	23 March 1951	Painter	
Resurrección María de Azkue	Spain	9 November 1951	Writer	
Mohammad-Taqi Bahar	Iran	22 April 1951	Poet	
R. H. Barlow	United States	2 January 1951	Writer, anthropologist	
Sarah Jane Baines	Australia	20 February 1951	Feminist, suffragette, social reformer	
Jacques de Baroncelli	France	12 January 1951	Film director	
Gaspar Agüero Barreras	Cuba	18 May 1951	Pianist, composer	
Pramathesh Barua	India	29 November 1951	Film director, actor, writer	
Daisy Bates	Australia	18 April 1951	Journalist, welfare worker	
Celadet Alî Bedirxan	Turkey	1951	Writer, linguist	
Frank Weston Benson	United States	15 November 1951	Painter	List of works by Frank Weston Benson
Jørgen Bentzon	Denmark	9 July 1951	Composer	
Konstantin Biebl	Czech Republic	12 November 1951	Poet	
Leo Birinski	Germany	23 October 1951	Playwright, screenwriter, film director	
Dorothea Foster Black	Australia	13 September 1951	Painter and printmaker	
Algernon Blackwood	United Kingdom	10 December 1951	Journalist, writer	Incredible Adventures, "The Willows", "The Wendigo" and The Doll and One Other
Francisco Boix	Spain	7 July 1951	Photographer	Photographs of Mauthausen concentration camp
Ivanoe Bonomi	Italy	20 April 1951	Politician	
Stephen Bonsal	United States	8 June 1951	Journalist, writer	
Tadeusz Borowski	Poland	3 July 1951	Writer, journalist	
Herman Charles Bosman	South Africa	14 October 1951	Writer	
Alfred-Alphonse Bottiau	France	25 February 1951	Sculptor	
James Bridie	Scotland	29 January 1951	Playwright, screenwriter, physician	
Hermann Broch	Austria	30 May 1951	Writer	The Sleepwalkers, The Death of Virgil
Gelett Burgess	United States	18 September 1951	Writer	"Purple Cow"
Abraham Cahan	United States	31 August 1951	Writer	The Rise of David Levinsky
Andrew Caldecott	United Kingdom	14 July 1951	Writer and British colonial administrator	
Amy Carmichael	Ireland	18 January 1951	Writer	
John Alden Carpenter	United States	26 April 1951	Composer	
Ethel Carrick	Australia	17 June 1951	Artist	
Émile Chartier	France	2 June 1951	Writer	
Alphonse de Châteaubriant	France	2 May 1951	Writer	The Keynote, La Brière
Peter Cheyney	United Kingdom	26 June 1951	Writer	Lemmy Caution, Slim Callaghan
Ben Chifley	Australia	13 June 1951	Politician	
Cho Ki-chon	North Korea	31 July 1951	Poet	
Gendün Chöphel	Tibet	1951	Writer, poet	
Al Christie	Canada	14 April 1951	Film director	
Halfdan Cleve	Norway	6 April 1951	Composer	
Christabel Cockerell	United Kingdom	18 March 1951	Painter	
Edith Coleman	Australia	3 June 1951	Naturalist	
Gustav Cords	Germany	18 February 1951	Composer	
Cara David	Australia	25 December 1951	Educator, feminist, social reformer	
Wilfrid de Glehn	United Kingdom	11 May 1951	Painter	
Nirupama Devi	India	7 January 1951	Writer	
Enrique Santos Discépolo	Argentina	23 December 1951	Composer, director	
Hans Andrias Djurhuus	Faroe Islands	6 May 1951	Poet, writer	
Lloyd C. Douglas	United States	13 February 1951	Writer, pastor	Magnificent Obsession, The Robe
Georgios Drossinis	Greece	3 January 1951	Writer	
Frank DuMond	United States	6 February 1951	Illustrator, painter	
József Egry	Hungary	1951	Painter	
Mário Eloy	Portugal	5 September 1951	Painter	
Anastasia Eristavi-Khoshtaria	Georgia	1 May 1951	Writer	
John Erskine	United States	2 June 1951	Writer, composer	The Moral Obligation to Be Intelligent
'Abd al-'Aziz Fahmi	Egypt	1951	Poet	
Georgy Fedotov	Russia	1 September 1951	Writer	
Fei Mu	China	31 January 1951	Film director	Spring in a Small Town
Jerzy Fitelberg	United States	25 April 1951	Composer	
Kristo Floqi	Albania	1 July 1951	Playwright, politician	
John Flynn	Australia	5 May 1951	Minister, aviator	
Josef Bohuslav Foerster	Czech Republic	29 May 1951	Composer	List of compositions by Josef Bohuslav Foerster
Robert J. Flaherty	United States	23 July 1951	Filmmaker	Nanook of the North
Pietro Frosini	Italy	2 September 1951	Musician, composer	
Gao Jianfu	China	1951	Painter	
André Gide	France	19 February 1951	Writer	Bibliography of André Gide
Bert Grant	United States	9 May 1951	Composer	
María Grever	Mexico	15 December 1951	Composer	"What a Diff'rence a Day Makes"
René Guenon	France	7 January 1951	Philosopher and Sufi Scholar	The Reign of Quantity and the Signs of the Times
Jacinto Guerrero	Spain	15 September 1951	Composer	
James Norman Hall	United States	5 July 1951	Writer	Mutiny on the Bounty
Ebbe Hamerik	Denmark	12 August 1951	Composer	
Tamiki Hara	Japan	13 March 1951	Writer	Summer Flower
Fumiko Hayashi	Japan	28 June 1951	Writer	Bangiku
Józef Hecht	Poland	19 June 1951	Printmaker, painter	
Sadegh Hedayat	Iran	9 April 1951	Writer, poet	The Blind Owl, The Stray Dog
Thomas N. Heffron	United States	24 May 1951	Film director	
Herman Hupfeld	United States	8 June 1951	Songwriter	"As Time Goes By", "Let's Put Out the Lights (and Go to Sleep)"
Jenő Illés	Hungary	17 October 1951	Film director	
Ernest Ludvig Ipsen	United States	2 November 1951	Painter	
George Jeske	United States	28 October 1951	Film director	
Tor Jonsson	Norway	14 January 1951	Poet	
Gustave-Henri Jossot	France	7 April 1951	Illustrator, painter	
Robert Kahn	Germany	29 May 1951	Composer	
Alfrēds Kalniņš	Latvia	23 December 1951	Composer	
Karl Maria Kaufmann	Germany	6 February 1951	Archeologist	
Kim Dong-in	Korea	5 January 1951	Writer	
Kim Myeong-sun	Korea	22 June 1951	Writer	
Kitawaki Noboru	Japan	18 December 1951	Painter	
Tyra Kleen	Sweden	17 September 1951	Writer	
Georg af Klercker	Sweden	13 November 1951	Film director	South of the Highway
Katarzyna Kobro	Poland	21 February 1951	Avant-garde sculptor	
Alexander Krein	Soviet Union	25 April 1951	Composer	
Kwee Tek Hoay	Indonesia	4 July 1951	Writer	List of works by Kwee Tek Hoay
Constant Lambert	United Kingdom	21 August 1951	Composer	List of compositions by Constant Lambert
Louis Lavelle	France	1 September 1951	Philosopher	
Ernestina Lecuona	Cuba	3 September 1951	Pianist, composer	
Henri-René Lenormand	France	16 February 1951	Playwright	
Sinclair Lewis	United States	10 January 1951	Writer	Main Street, Babbitt, Arrowsmith
J. C. Leyendecker	United States	25 July 1951	Illustrator	The Arrow Collar Man
Heinz von Lichberg	Germany	14 March 1951	Writer	"Lolita"
Ana Aurora do Amaral Lisboa (pt)	Brazil	22 March 1951	Poet	
Benito Lynch	Argentina	23 December 1951	Writer	The Caranchos of Florida, The Englishman of the Bones, The Romance of a Gaucho
Richard Malden	United Kingdom	19 August 1951	Biblical scholar, editor, author of ghost stories	
Carl Gustaf Emil Mannerheim	Finland	27 January 1951	Politician, memoirist	
Homero Manzi	Argentina	3 May 1951	Writer	
Edwin L. Marin	United States	2 May 1951	Film director	
Konstantin Märska	Estonia	30 August 1951	Film director	
Nellie McClung	Canada	1 September 1951	Writer	
Nikolai Medtner	Russia	13 November 1951	Composer	List of compositions by Nikolai Medtner
Oscar Micheaux	United States	25 March 1951	Writer, director	
Hasrat Mohani	India	13 May 1951	Independence activist, poet	
Giuseppe Mulè	Italy	10 September 1951	Composer	
Takashi Nagai	Japan	1 May 1951	Writer	The Bells of Nagasaki
Nam Cao	Vietnam	1951	Writer	
Ștefan Neaga	Moldova	30 May 1951	Composer	Anthem of the Moldavian Soviet Socialist Republic
Ndoc Nikaj	Albania	16 January 1951	Writer	
Ivor Novello	United Kingdom	6 March 1951	Composer	"Keep the Home Fires Burning"
Selim Palmgren	Finland	13 December 1951	Composer, pianist	
Pyotr Pavlenko	Soviet Union	16 June 1951	Writer	
Scott Pembroke	United States	21 February 1951	Film director	
Brian Penton	Australia	24 August 1951	Journalist, novelist	Landtakers
Felix Petyrek	Austria	1 December 1951	Composer	
Andrei Platonov	Soviet Union	5 January 1951	Writer	The Foundation Pit
Ľudmila Podjavorinská	Slovakia	2 March 1951	Writer, poet	
Clara Katharina Pollaczek	Austria	22 July 1951	Writer	
Voydan Popgeorgiev – Chernodrinski	Bulgaria	8 January 1951	Playwright, writer	Macedonian Blood Wedding
George Henry Powell	United Kingdom	3 December 1951	Songwriter	"Pack Up Your Troubles in Your Old Kit-Bag"
Paula von Preradović	Austria	25 May 1951	Writer	National anthem of Austria
James Peter Quinn	Australia	18 February 1951	Painter	
Assen Razcvetnikov	Bulgaria	30 July 1951	Writer	
Godofredo Rangel	Brazil	4 August 1951	Writer, translator	
Gholamreza Rashid-Yasemi	Iran	1951	Poet	
Cattamanchi Ramalinga Reddy	India	24 February 1951	Educator, writer	
Henri Rivière	France	24 August 1951	Painter	
Sigmund Romberg	United States	9 November 1951	Composer	
Phil Rosen	United States	22 October 1951	Film director	
Georges Hanna Sabbagh	France	1951	Painter	
Pedro Salinas	Spain	4 December 1951	Poet	
Harry Schmidt	Germany	7 September 1951	Mathematician	
Artur Schnabel	Austria	15 August 1951	Classical pianist, composer	Artur Schnabel's recordings of Beethoven's piano sonatas
Arnold Schoenberg	Austria; United States	13 July 1951	Composer, music theorist	List of compositions by Arnold Schoenberg
Percival Serle	Australia	16 December 1951	Writer	
Robert Seton-Watson	United Kingdom	25 July 1951	Historian	
Levon Shant	Armenia	29 November 1951	Playwright	
Angelos Sikelianos	Greece	19 June 1951	Poet, playwright	
S. Sylvan Simon	United States	17 May 1951	Film director	
Houcine Slaoui	Morocco	1951	Musician	
John Sloan	United States	7 September 1951	Painter	
Pamela Colman Smith	United Kingdom	18 September 1951	Illustrator	Rider–Waite tarot deck
Henry De Vere Stacpoole	(Republic of Ireland) Ireland	12 April 1951	Writer	The Blue Lagoon
Paul L. Stein	Austria	2 May 1951	Film director	
Arthur Szyk	Poland	13 September 1951	Illustrator	
Abanindranath Tagore	India	5 December 1951	Painter, writer	
Maila Talvio	Finland	6 January 1951	Writer	
Mary Tannahill	United States	21 June 1951	Painter	
Nikoghayos Tigranian	Armenia	17 February 1951	Composer	
Timrava	Slovakia	27 November 1951	Writer	
Julio Torres Mayorga	Colombia	9 January 1951	Musician and songwriter	"Los Camarones"
Marcel Tournier	France	8 May 1951	Composer	
Walter Trier	Germany	8 July 1951	Illustrator	Illustration of Emil and the Detectives and Lilliput covers
Manuel Ugarte	Argentina	1951	Writer	
Jan Valtin	Germany	14 January 1951	Writer, covert agent	
Maxence Van der Meersch	France	14 January 1951	Writer	Bodies and Souls
Vsevolod Vishnevsky	Soviet Union	28 February 1951	Playwright	
Henrik Visnapuu	Estonia	3 April 1951	Poet	
Will Vodery	United States	18 November 1951	Composer	
Volodymyr Vynnychenko	Ukraine	6 March 1951	Writer, playwright	
Richard Wallace	United States	3 November 1951	Film director	
Jean-Jacques Waltz	France	10 June 1951	Illustrator	
Nik Welter	Luxembourg	13 July 1951	Writer	
Ludwig Wittgenstein	Austria; United Kingdom	29 April 1951	Philosopher	Tractatus Logico-Philosophicus, Philosophical Investigations
Wols	Germany	1 September 1951	Painter, photographer	
Gregorios Xenopoulos	Greece	14 January 1951	Writer	
Miyamoto Yuriko	Japan	21 January 1951	Writer	
Corrado Zoli	Italy	8 December 1951	Writer	
Hermynia Zur Mühlen	Austria	20 March 1951	Writer, translator	

== United States ==
Under the Copyright Term Extension Act, books published in 1936, films released in 1936, and other works published in 1936 will enter the public domain in 2032. Sound recordings published in 1931 and unpublished works whose authors died in 1961 will also enter the public domain.

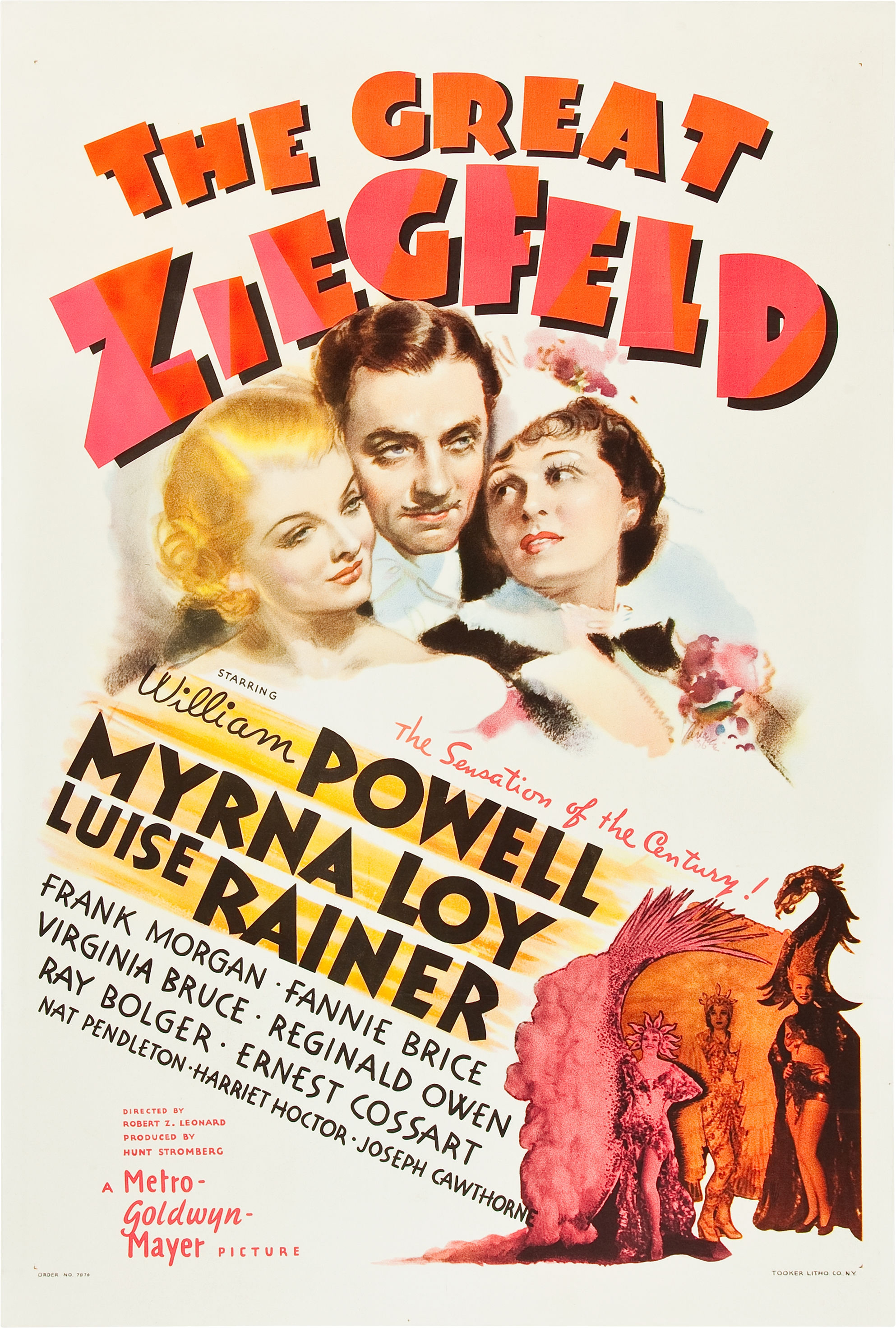
MGM's The Great Ziegfeld will enter the public domain in 2032.

Notable films entering the public domain in 2032 include Best Picture Academy Award winner The Great Ziegfeld with William Powell and Luise Rainer, Charlie Chaplin's Modern Times (the final film of his character "The Tramp"), the Alfred Hitchcock films Secret Agent and Sabotage, the John Ford films Mary of Scotland and The Prisoner of Shark Island, Frank Capra's Mr. Deeds Goes to Town with Gary Cooper, the eleventh Universal Monsters film Dracula's Daughter, Jean Renoir's films Partie de campagne and The Crime of Monsieur Lange, The Story of Louis Pasteur with Paul Muni, Mervyn LeRoy's Anthony Adverse with Fredric March and Olivia de Havilland, the George Cukor adaptations of Romeo and Juliet with Norma Shearer and Leslie Howard and Camille with Greta Garbo and Robert Taylor, Marcel Pagnol's César, The Petrified Forest with Howard, Bette Davis, and Humphrey Bogart, William Wyler's Dodsworth with Walter Huston, Fritz Lang's first Hollywood film Fury with Spencer Tracy and Bruce Cabot, William Cameron Menzies' Things to Come (an adaptation of H.G. Wells' The Shape of Things to Come), San Francisco with Clark Gable and Jeanette MacDonald, Cecil B. DeMille's The Plainsman with Cooper and Jean Arthur, Swing Time with Fred Astaire and Ginger Rogers, Berthold Viertel's biopic Rhodes of Africa starring Huston as Cecil Rhodes, Judy Garland's debut film Pigskin Parade, Fred Zinnemann's directorial debut Redes, Walt Disney's Mickey Mouse cartoons Thru the Mirror and Mickey's Rival (the debut and only Golden Age appearance of the character Mortimer Mouse) and Silly Symphony short The Country Cousin, and the Merrie Melodies short I Love to Singa.

Among the literary works that will enter the public domain are Margaret Mitchell's novel Gone with the Wind, Daphne du Maurier's novel Jamaica Inn, Agatha Christie's Hercule Poirot mystery novels The A. B. C. Murders, Cards on the Table and Murder in Mesopotamia, as well as her short story collection The Thirteen Problems; Arthur Miller's debut play No Villain; William Faulkner's novel Absalom, Absalom!; Clare Boothe Luce's play The Women; John Dos Passos' The Big Money; John Maynard Keynes' The General Theory of Employment, Interest and Money; C.S. Lewis's nonfiction work The Allegory of Love; Munro Leaf's The Story of Ferdinand; Michael Innes' mystery novel Death at the President's Lodging introducing Sir John Appleby, Arthur Ransome's Pigeon Post, Louis-Ferdinand Céline's Death on Credit, The Hardy Boys' fifteenth novel The Sinister Signpost, the Nancy Drew novel The Mystery of the Ivory Charm, Hendrik Marsman's poem Memory of Holland, Hergé's Tintin story The Blue Lotus in its original French black-and-white version; and the first issues of Life magazine.

Notable musical works entering the public domain include the popular songs "The Glory of Love", "I've Got You Under My Skin", "Pennies from Heaven", and "The Way You Look Tonight"; Alban Berg's Violin Concerto; Sergei Prokofiev's Peter and the Wolf (one of the most famous foreign works affected by the 2012 Supreme Court decision Golan v. Holder); and Dmitri Shostakovich's Symphony No. 4.

Works of art entering the public domain include Salvador Dalí's Lobster Telephone and the first design of the Aalto Vase from Alvar and Aino Aalto, which is currently still being made and sold by the Finnish design brand Iittala.

== See also ==
- List of American films of 1936
- 1936 in literature
- 1936 in music
- 1961 in literature and 1981 in literature for deaths of writers
- Public Domain Day
- Creative Commons
