= Selected Essays =

Among the numerous literary works titled Selected Essays are the following:

- Selected Essays (Frederick Douglass) by Frederick Douglass
- Selected Essays (T. S. Eliot) by T. S. Eliot
- Selected Essays (William Troy) by William Troy
