= The Moon Maid =

Fantasy novel by Edgar Rice Burroughs

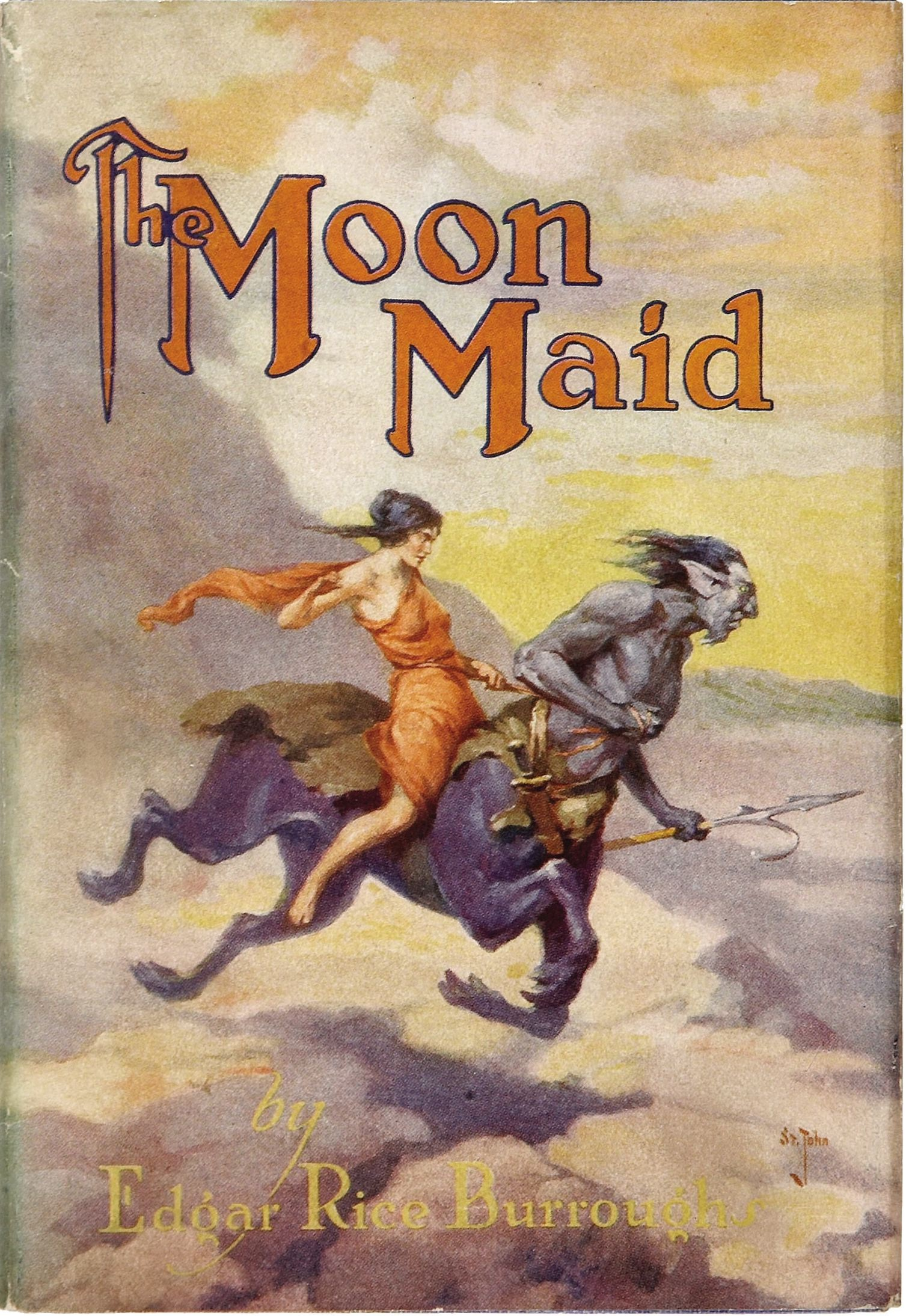
- Dust jacket from the first edition.
- Author: Edgar Rice Burroughs
- Cover artist: J. Allen St. John
- Language: English
- Genre: Fantasy
- Publisher: A. C. McClurg
- Publication date: 6 February 1926
- Publication place: United States
- Media type: Print (Hardback)
- Pages: 412
- Text: The Moon Maid online

The Moon Maid is a fantasy novel by American writer Edgar Rice Burroughs. It was written in three parts, Part 1 was begun in June 1922 under the title The Moon Maid, Part 2 was begun in 1919 under the title Under the Red Flag, later retitled The Moon Men, Part 3 was titled The Red Hawk. As evident from the name Under the Red Flag, it appears to have been originally set in contemporary Soviet Russia, with the Bolsheviks as villains; as this was not popular with the publishers, Burroughs transferred it to a science-fictional setting, with the evil Communist-like "Kalkars" taking over the Moon (in the first part) and then the Earth (in the second part, with the help of a renegade Earthman) and being finally overthrown in the third part.

The book version was first published by A. C. McClurg on February 6, 1926, under the title The Moon Maid, though it was shortened from the serial. The three parts have been published in varying combinations and under varying titles since 1926.

== Literary significance and reception ==
The book is well regarded, and described by one critic, Richard A. Lupoff, as the best of Edgar Rice Burrough's non-series "scientific romances". He describes the book as conveying a remarkable sense of wonder. He goes on to say that the extrapolation of society, including the feudal and nomadic societies of the conquered earth, display new facets of Burrough's skill as a writer. For example, a surviving Stars and Stripes flag which had been in the Battle of Argonne Forest in World War I comes after many generations to be worshipped as a powerful totem by Americans who had reverted to tribal nomadic life on the Great Plains, with the flag's original meaning completely forgotten. P. Schuyler Miller wrote that "Most readers agree that 'The Moon Maid' was Burroughs's best book and best science fiction."

== Future history ==
The prologues to both parts, "The Moon Maid" and "The Moon Men", constitute a future history, effectively Burroughs' vision of what the 20th century held in store for humanity, which could be considered a kind of retroactive alternate history—a genre rare in Burroughs' writings and a bit reminiscent of such works as H. G. Wells' The Shape of Things to Come. Burroughs was writing in the early 1920s, several years after the end of the First World War in 1918; clearly, however, he did not regard the war as having truly ended but only changed in intensity—especially as it had been directly followed by the October Revolution in Russia and the intervention of the Western powers in an effort to crush that revolution (Britain and France did send token forces to "crush the Revolution", but American forces sent by President Wilson had no orders to try to end Marxist rule), which the staunchly anti-Communist Burroughs supported. As envisioned by Burroughs, there would follow many decades of unceasing worldwide fighting at various locations and at various intensities until a great outburst in 1959, leading to eight years of all-out war. In Burroughs's vision posterity would not divide this into a "first war", an "inter-war period" and a "second war"; rather, one single war, "The Great War" would be deemed to have started in 1914 and lasted until 1967.

In Burroughs's vision, this decades-long war would culminate in April 1967 with the total victory of the Anglo-Saxon Powers, Britain and the US, and the complete defeat and surrender of all other powers. Britain and the US thereupon become co-rulers of the planet, London and Washington being the twin planetary capitals and the US president and British monarch acting as co-rulers. The British-American domination of the world is imposed by the International Peace Fleet, made up of airships, which is given a complete global monopoly of armed force. This bears some resemblance to the "Air and Sea Control" envisioned in Wells' above-mentioned The Shape of Things to Come, enforcing worldwide "The Dictatorship of the Air". Although it is closer to Kipling's "Aviation Board of Control" ("ABC") which was armed with airships. There are also similarities with Robert Heinlein's later vision of a US-dominated "International Patrol", made of airplanes equipped with radioactive dust—which in "Solution Unsatisfactory" would dominate the world's skies at the end of World War II, and which Heinlein later upgraded into a nuclear-armed Interplanetary Patrol.

In Burroughs's vision, the Anglo-Saxon victory in 1967 is immediately followed by the first sending of a crewed spacecraft to the Moon—Burroughs having come very near to the actual 1969 date of the Apollo 11 Moon landing. The spaceship is seen taking off in a blaze of worldwide publicity and celebration, with the war's Anglo-Saxon victors seeking to provide a sense of common purpose to the forcibly unified world. However, the Moon in Burroughs' imagining turns out to be inhabited and the various races and cultures inhabiting its interior provide the setting for the more typically Burroughs adventures of "The Moon Maid". From the global point of view, the space venture horribly boomerangs by bringing the evil Earthling genius Orthis into contact with the malevolent Kalkars of the Moon, though the disastrous results would become evident only much later. In the first decades of the 21st Century the world basks in peace, there seems no enemy and no threat anywhere, and pressure grows for complete disarmament and scrapping of the International Peace Fleet. Due to resistance by the King of Britain, half of the Fleet and of the world's armament industries are retained—which is not enough to resist the Kalkar invasion fleets, built and led by Orthis, which descend on the world in 2050.

London and Washington are captured at once by the invaders, who range the world at will. In a last effort they are confronted by the remnants of the Peace Fleet; the heroic Julian V and the evil Orthis destroy each other. However, the Kalkars remain in possession of the world and bring millions of their fellows from the Moon to colonize it. But lacking Orthis' organizing genius, they are unable to maintain the civilization they conquered. Their oppressive rule degenerates into semi-feudal enclaves, and they lose contact with the Moon. Eventually, Americans fleeing Kalkar rule and reverting to nomadic tribal life on the Great Plains grow stronger—and the Kalkars correspondingly weaker—until at last the American tribes capture California and the last Kalkars flee into the Pacific.

== Copyright ==
The copyright for this story has expired in Australia, and thus now resides in the public domain there. The text is available via Project Gutenberg Australia. As of 2022, it is in the public domain in the United States as well.

== See also ==
- Invasion literature
