= Hashem Jawad =

59th Iraqi Minister of Foreign Affairs

Hashim Al-Jawad
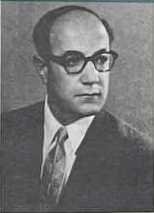
- Portrait of Hashim Al-Jawad

Foreign Minister of Iraq
- In office 7 February 1959 – 8 February 1963
- President: Muhammad Najib ar-Ruba'i (Chairman of Sovereignty Council)
- Prime Minister: Abdul Karim Qassem
- Preceded by: Abdul Jabbar Jomard
- Succeeded by: Talib El-Shibib

Acting minister of finance
- In office 3 March 1960 – 15 November 1960
- President: Muhammad Najib ar-Ruba'i (Chairman of Sovereignty Council)
- Prime Minister: Abdul Karim Qassem
- Preceded by: Mohammed Hadid

Personal details
- Born: 15 January 1911 Baghdad, Ottoman Empire
- Died: 12 October 1972 (aged 61) Beirut, Lebanon
- Occupation: Politician

Hashem Jawad (Arabic: هاشم جواد; 1911 in Baghdad – 1972 in Beirut) was an Iraqi politician and who served as Foreign Minister of iraq from 1959 to 1963.

== Early life ==
Hashem Jawad was born at 15 January 1911 in Baghdad, he finished his study at high school in 1928, then entered The American University of Beirut and graduated in 1932, He obtained a diploma in political science and economics from the University of London.

== Political life ==
During his mandate he represented Iraq at the 1st Summit of the Non-Aligned Movement in Belgrade, FPR Yugoslavia making the country a founding member of the Non-Aligned Movement. He was also acting Minister of Finance from March 1960 to November 1960.

== Assassination ==
Hashim Jawad was assassinated on 12 October 1972 in Beirut.
