= Notes on Democracy =

1926 book by H. L. Mencken

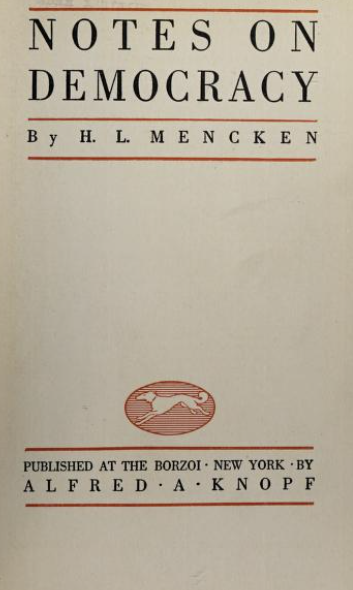
- Author: H. L. Mencken
- Language: English
- Subject: Democracy
- Published: New York City
- Publisher: Alfred A. Knopf
- Publication date: 1926
- Publication place: United States
- Media type: Print
- Pages: 212
- OCLC: 182664

Notes on Democracy is a 1926 book by American journalist, satirist and leading cultural critic H. L. Mencken.

The initial print run was only 235 copies; another edition was printed later in 1926. A number of reprints of the book have continued to be issued, with editions released in 2008 and 2012.

== Synopsis and impact ==
Notes on Democracy is a critique of democracy. The book places political leaders into two categories: the demagogue, who "preaches doctrines he knows to be untrue to men he knows to be idiots" and the demaslave, "who listens to what these idiots have to say and then pretends that he believes it himself." Mencken depicts politicians as "men who have sold their honor for their jobs."

== Reception ==
Writing for The Saturday Review of Literature Walter Lippmann described the book as a "tremendous polemic" which "destroy[s] by rendering it ridiculous and unfashionable, the democratic tradition of the American pioneers" and likens Notes on Democracy to The Social Contract by Jean-Jacques Rousseau, but Lippmann also criticizes Mencken by saying "The chief weakness of the book, as a book of ideas, arises out of this naive contrast in Mr. Mencken’s mind between the sordid reality he knows and the splendid society he imagines."
