= C. C. MacApp =

American novelist

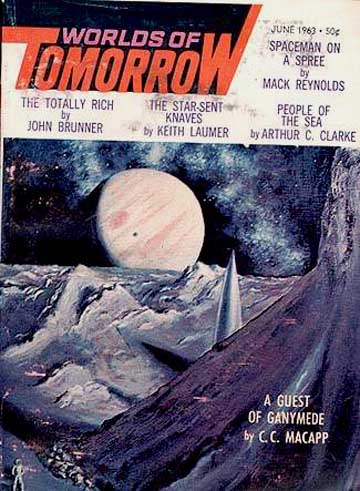
MacApp's novelette "A Guest of Ganymede" took the cover of the June 1963 issue of Worlds of Tomorrow

C. C. MacApp, pseudonym of Carroll Mather Capps (27 November 1917 – 15 January 1971) was an American science fiction author. He was also a long-time benefactor of San Francisco chess. MacApp was a former president of the San Francisco Bay Area Chess League, and won the Northern California and San Francisco chess championship several times. He also wrote as Carroll J. Clem.

== Bibliography ==
=== Novels ===
As listed in Fantastic Fiction

- Omha Abides (1968)
- Prisoners of the Sky (1969)
- Secret of the Sunless World (as Carroll M. Capps, 1969)
- Worlds of the Wall (1969)
- Recall Not Earth (1970)
- SUBB (1971)
- Bumsider (1972)

=== Short stories ===
Published in Galaxy Science Fiction:

- "The Drug" Galaxy, February 1961
- "And All the Earth a Grave" Galaxy, December 1963
- "A Flask of Fine Arcturan" Galaxy, February 1965
- "Sculptor" Galaxy, April 1965
- "The Mercurymen" Galaxy, December 1965
- "Spare That Tree" Galaxy, June 1967

Published in Worlds of If:

- "Prisoners of the Sky", Worlds of If, February 1966
- "The Impersonators", Worlds of If, January 1967
- "When Sea is Born Again", Worlds of If, May 1967
- "A Ticket to Zenner"", Worlds of If, July 1967
- "The Fortunes of Peace", Worlds of If, September 1967
- "Winter of the Llangs", Worlds of If, October 1967
- "Mail Drop", Worlds of If, November 1967
- "Where the Subbs Go", Worlds of If, May 1968
- "The Hides of Marrech", Worlds of If, July 1968
- "Dream Street", Worlds of If, September 1968
- "Mad Ship", Worlds of If, May 1969

=== Gree series ===
This space opera series ran in Worlds of If alongside Fred Saberhagen's Berserker series and Keith Laumer's tales of Jame Retief.

- "The Slavers of Gree", Worlds of If, August 1964
- "Gree's Commandos", Worlds of If, February 1965
- "Gree's Hellcats", Worlds of If, April 1965
- "No Friend of Gree", Worlds of If, June 1965
- "Gree's Damned Ones", Worlds of If, September 1965
- "Like Any World of Gree", Worlds of Tomorrow, March 1966
- "Enemies of Gree", Worlds of If, September 1966
- "The Sign of Gree", Worlds of If, November 1966
- "A Beachhead for Gree", Worlds of If, February 1967

== Awards ==
His novella The Mercurymen was a finalist for the 1965 Nebula Award for Best Novella.
