= Incredible Adventures =

1914 book by Algernon Blackwood

Incredible Adventures is a collection by Algernon Blackwood, comprising three novellas and two short stories. It was originally published by Macmillan in 1914 and reprinted in 2004 by Hippocampus Press. H. P. Lovecraft wrote that:

In the volume titled Incredible Adventures occur some of the finest tales which the author has yet produced, leading the fancy to wild rites on nocturnal hills, to secret and terrible aspects lurking behind stolid scenes, and to unimaginable vaults of mystery below the sands and pyramids of Egypt; all with a serious finesse and delicacy that convince where a cruder or lighter treatment would merely amuse. Some of these accounts are hardly stories at all, but rather studies in elusive impressions and half-remembered snatches of dream. Plot is everywhere negligible, and atmosphere reigns untrammelled.

S. T. Joshi has acclaimed Incredible Adventures as possibly "the premier weird collection of this or any other century".

The book contains the following stories, all novella-length except for "The Sacrifice" and "Wayfarers":

- The Regeneration of Lord Ernie
- "The Sacrifice"
- The Damned
- A Descent into Egypt
- "Wayfarers"
