= Harry Schmidt (mathematician) =

German mathematician (1894–1951)

Harry Schmidt (21 June 1894, in Hamburg – 7 September 1951, in Halle) was a German mathematician. Core areas of his research were experimental physics, as well as the theory of boundary layers and wings in aerodynamics.

== Biography ==
In 1913 Schmidt began his study of physics, chemistry, mathematics, and philosophy at the University of Leipzig. There he received in 1919 his Ph.D. (Promotion) in theoretical physics with dissertation Über die Möglichkeit und Stabilität von Gleichgewichtszuständen ruhender sowie rotierender Elektronengruppen innerhalb einer im allgemeinen nichtäquivalenten Kugel von homogener positiver Elektrizität (On the possibility and stability of equilibrium states of stationary and rotating electron groups within a generally non-spherical region of homogeneous electricity). In 1926 he received his Habilitation at the University of Leipzig. In 1932 in Zurich he was an Invited Speaker of the ICM, with talk Zur Statistik und Dynamik elastischer Platten. From 1937 to 1945 he was a research associate of the Deutsche Versuchsanstalt für Luftfahrt in Berlin-Adlershof. In 1945 Schmidt was appointed a professor ordinarius of applied mathematics at the Martin Luther University of Halle-Wittenberg, and later became there the director of the Institute for Applied Mathematics. After two years of severe illness, Schmidt died in September 1951 from pulmonary tuberculosis.

== Selected publications ==
=== Articles ===
- "Zur Theorie der erzwungenen Schwingungen." Zeitschrift für Physik A Hadrons and Nuclei 39, no. 5 (1926): 474–489. doi:10.1007/BF01322056
- "Theorie der Biegungsschwingungen frei aufliegender Rechteckplatten unter dem Einfluß beweglicher, zeitlich periodisch veränderlicher Belastungen." Archive of Applied Mechanics 2, no. 4 (1931): 449–471. doi:10.1007/BF02079951
- "Bemerkung zur Statik der Kreisplatte." Mathematische Annalen 112, no. 1 (1936): 322–324. doi:10.1007/BF01565420
- "Strenge Lösungen zur Prandtlschen Theorie der tragenden Linie." ZAMM‐Journal of Applied Mathematics and Mechanics/Zeitschrift für Angewandte Mathematik und Mechanik 17, no. 2 (1937): 101-116. doi:10.1002/zamm.19370170207

=== Books ===
- Aerodynamik des Fluges. Eine Einführung in die mathematische Tragflächentheorie. W. de Gruyter & Co. Berlin, 1929.
- Einführung in die Theorie der Wellengleichung. J. A. Barth, Leipzig, 1931. vi+146 pp.
- Einführung in die Vektor- und Tensorrechnung unter besonderer Berücksichtigung ihrer physikalischen Bedeutung, Leipzig, Jänecke, 1935
- Einführung in die Vektor- und Tensorrechnung unter besonderer Berücksichtigung ihrer physikalischen Bedeutung Berlin : Verl. Technik, 1953
- Analysis der elementaren Funktionen, Berlin : Verl. Technik, 1953
