= Nalam Krishna Rao =

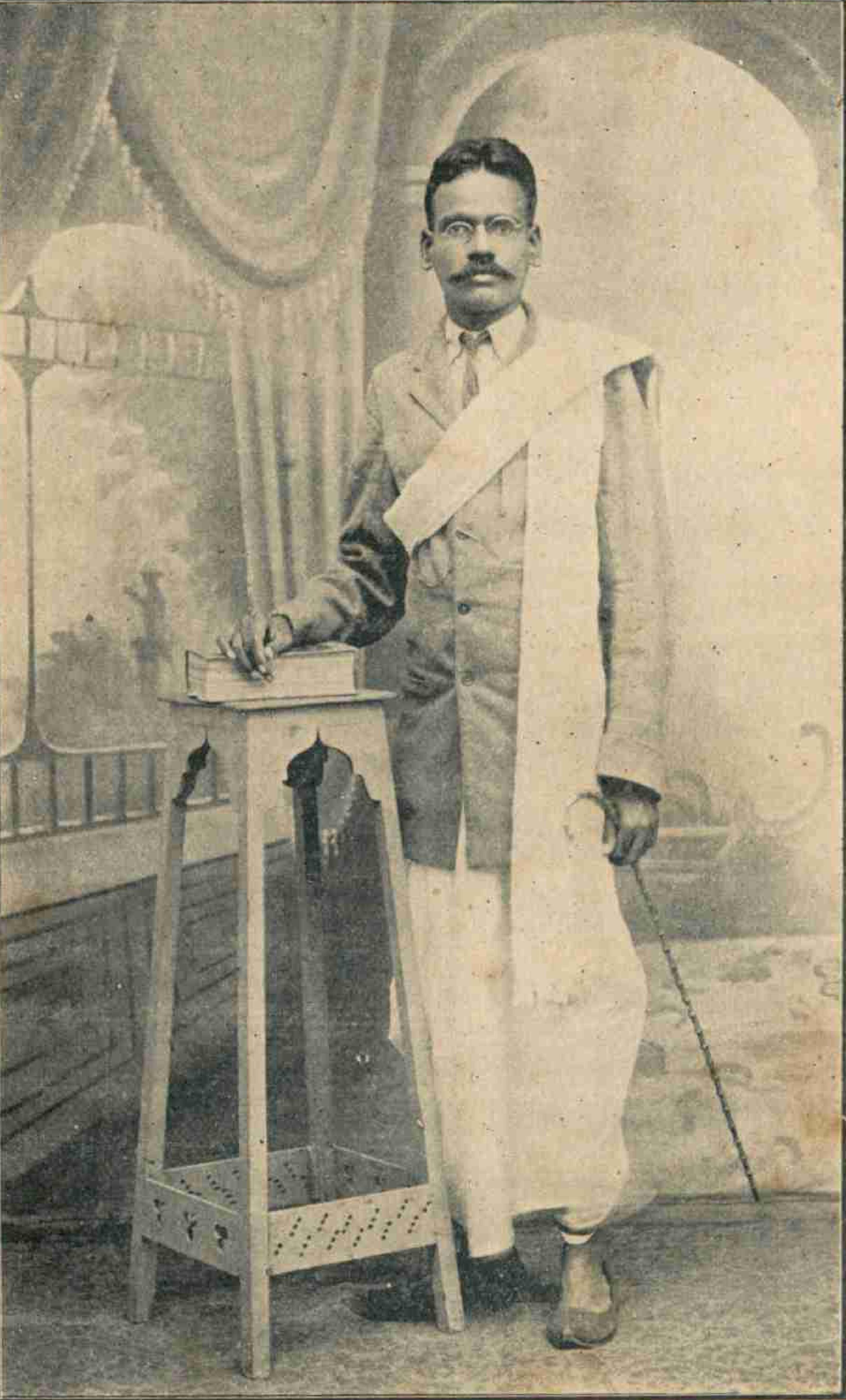
- Born: January 18, 1881; Mandapeta in East Godavari district
- Died: 1961 (aged 79–80)
- Occupations: Telugu writer, magazine editor and social activis

Nalam Krishna Rao was an accomplished Telugu writer, magazine editor and social activist. He was born at Mandapeta in East Godavari district on 18 January 1881. He founded Gowthami Grandhalayam at Rajahmundry in 1898. Rao supported eradicating the social evil of the caste system and strongly supported widow remarriages. Every year, Telugu University presents endowment awards to writers, artistes and critics. Nalam Krishna Rao Memorial Award is one among those, which is given for Best Women Writer in Telugu.

== Works ==
- Sri Krishnaraya Andhra Vignana Sarwasvamu
- Jateeya Lokoktulu
