= Jean-Jacques Waltz =

French illustrator

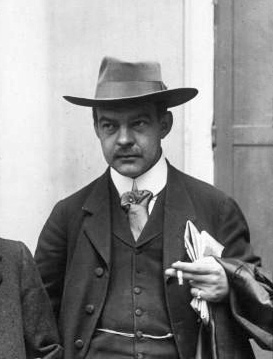
"Uncle Hansi" in 1914

Jean-Jacques Waltz (23 February 1873, Colmar – 10 June 1951), also known as "Oncle Hansi", or simply "Hansi" ("little John") was an Alsatian artist, born during the German occupation of the region. He was a staunch pro-French activist, and is famous for his quaint drawings, some of which contain harsh critiques of the Germans of the time. He was also a French hero of both the First and the Second World Wars.

== Biography ==
=== Early life ===
Jean-Jacques Waltz was born in Colmar the 23 February 1873, two years after the annexation of Alsace by the German Empire following the Franco-Prussian War of 1870–1.

He worked as an artist for the textile industry, and drew postcards and programmes for local events. He started publishing satirical works in 1908 under the pseudonym "Hansi", making particular fun of German tourists.

=== First satirical works and First World War ===
Hansi became famous with his polemical satiric work Professor Knatschke (1912), which became a best-seller in France, as well as several other militant works. He came to incarnate the symbol of pro-French Alsatians, especially among "revanchist" French intellectuals such as Maurice Barrès.

Hansi was imprisoned several times by the German authorities for making fun of the German military and professors, culminating in a one-year sentence given by the tribunal of Leipzig in July 1914. This caused a national outrage in France, making headlines in newspapers and inspiring two editorials by Clemenceau.

Hansi eventually escaped to France, having crossed the frontier at the Schlucht on 14 July and arriving in Belfort, where he joined the military as a translator-officer when the First World War broke out.

=== Late life ===
In 1940, Hansi, still wanted by the Gestapo for his militant works and his treason of 1914, had to flee into Vichy, France. He was attacked by the Nazis in Agen, and fled to Switzerland.

Badly wounded because of this attack, he remained weak until he died in 1951.

=== Legacy ===
Hansi is now archetypal of Alsace folklore. His original books, published in a few thousand copies, are valued among collectors. It is very common to find plates and every-day items decorated with his drawings. His books have been republished several times.

== Works ==
- Professor Knatschke
- Le voyage d'Erika en Alsace Française
- L'Histoire d'Alsace Racontée aux Petits Enfants d'Alsace et de France par l'Oncle Hansi
- Mon Village, ceux qui n'oublient pas
- L' Alsace Heureuse
- Le Paradis Tricolore
- A travers les lignes ennemies
- L'Alsace
- Colmar en France
- Colmar, guide illustré des champs de bataille
- Les clochers dans les Vignes
- Au pied de la Montagne Ste Odile
- La fresque de Geispolsheim et autres balivernes
- La merveilleuse Histoire du bon Saint Florentin
- Les armes des villes et des communes 80 documents héraldiques dessinés et commentés par JJ Waltz
- Les armes des tribus et des corporations et emblèmes des artisans
- Les armes des nobles et des bourgeois
- Souvenir d'un annexé récalcitrant

== Honours ==
- Commandor of the Légion d'Honneur
- Croix de Guerre 1914–1918 with palms
- Croix de Guerre 1939-1945 with palms
