= Roussan Camille =

Haitian poet, journalist, and diplomat

- Born: 27 August 1912; Jacmel, Haiti
- Died: 7 December 1961 (aged 49)
- Other name: Nassour El Limac
- Occupations: Poet; journalist; diplomat
- Known for: Assaut à la Nuit (1940)

Roussan Camille (27 August 1912 – 7 December 1961) was a Haitian poet, journalist, and diplomat.

== Biography ==
Born in Jacmel, he was educated at the Christian Brothers' School, the Lycée Pinchinat of Jacmel and the Tippenhauer College in Port-au-Prince. Under Charles Moravia's directorship, he began a career as a journalist, publishing articles, poems and the column "Bel aujourd'hui" under his pen-name Nassour El Limac, in Haiti-Journal, Temps-Revue and L'Action nationale. He became director of Haiti-Journal after Moravia's death in 1938.

Camille entered public service, and was appointed to several diplomatic functions, including secretary of the Haitian legation to Paris and Haitian vice-consul in New York City, and then returned home to become secretary general in the ministry of health.

His best known work is Assaut à la Nuit (Port-au-Prince: Impr. de l'Etat, 1940). He was awarded the Dumarsais Estimé poetry prize for his collection Multiple Présence (Quebec: Editions Naaman, 1978).

== Awards ==
- 1961 Price Dumarsais Estimé.
- 2004 Henri Deschamps Literary Award (posthumous).

== Notes ==
- Schutt-Ainé, Patricia (1994). Haiti: A Basic Reference Book. Staff of Librairie Au Service de la Culture. Miami, Florida: Librairie Au Service de la Culture. p. 101. ISBN 0-9638599-0-0.
