= Gaspar Agüero Barreras =

Cuban composer and educator (1873–1951)

Gaspar Aguero Barreras
- Born: February 15, 1873; Camagüey
- Died: May 18, 1951 (aged 78)
- Occupations: Composer, Pianist, Professor

Gaspar Aguero Barreras (February 15, 1873 – May 18, 1951) was a Cuban composer, pianist, and professor. Aguero created numerous musical works, but he was best known for his contributions to Cuban music through his teaching philosophies that have become the basis of child-centered musical philosophies.

== Life and career ==
Aguero was born in the small province of Camagüey to a very musical family, and started his musical career when he and his family moved to the capital of Cuba He began studying music with his father, Oliverio Agüero, and later finished his studies in Europe with the teacher Rafael Palau. It became apparent that Gaspar was a prodigy and he began writing operettas at age 14, and would conduct different groups. Then in 1902 he would leave the career of being a conductor to focus on his career of begin a music professor. Aguero was a professor for 58 years at Associacion de Dependientes del Comercio. Later on, he decided to get a new job at Hubert de Blank's conservatory where he taught piano. On the side, he helped out at the Escuelo Normal de Maestros de la Habanas where he took on the part as one of the most inspiring individuals. He later died in 1951.

== Influences ==
Barreras was a forward-thinking pedagogue and was quite knowledgeable of philosophers such as Leibniz and Descartes. He implemented many of these ideas into his teaching ideology of child-centered musical education.

== Musical works ==
- Alegría Sonnia, boceto sinfónico.
- Cantos escolares, Estudios de las texturas.

=== Lyrical theater ===
- El cinematógrafo parlante o El combate naval de Santiago de Cuba, (1901).
- Huérfana y sola me quedé en el mundo, (1901).
- El país del choteo, (1902).
- La fonda de don Tadeo, (1903).
- La Loma del Ángel, (1904).
- Los effectos del cinturón, (1905).
- El naufragio libre, (1906).
- Los caprichos de Gabriela.
- En la calle y sin llavín y disgustado con el sereno, (1907).
- Baños de mar y La ley del hambre, (1909).
