= Clara Katharina Pollaczek =

Viennese writer

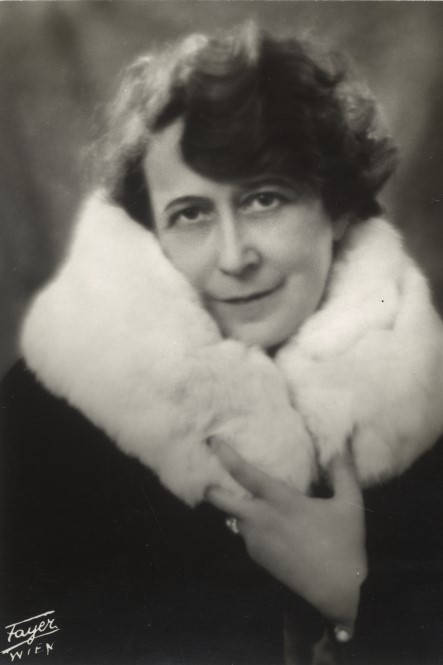
Clara Katharina Pollaczek Foto Fayer, Wien, ca. 1920

Clara Pollaczek (born Clara Loeb; 15 January 1875 – 22 July 1951) was a Viennese writer of light novels, stories and verse. She also wrote several stage works. Some of her works appeared under the pseudonyms "Bob" or "Bob Béol".

She is, in addition, known to scholars of literature on account of her relationship with Arthur Schnitzler whose life partner she became between 1923 and his death in 1931.

== Life ==
Clara Loeb was born into a culturally aware family of intellectual secular Jews in Vienna, where she grew up along with her two brothers, Alfred and Otto, and her sister, Anna. (It is believed that she took to using the middle name, "Katharina", only after she was eighteen.) Her grandfather had been a textiles magnate who clothed the Habsburg armies during the Napoleonic Wars. Her father, Louis Loeb/Löb (1843–1928), was a banker. The family were prosperous and while she was growing up there were frequent family holidays in Bad Ischl.

Gifted and intensively educated, when Clara was 19 she began to write, using male pseudonyms when publishing her work. In April 1897 "Mimi: Silhouettes from a girl's life" (" Mimi. Schattenbilder aus einem Mädchenleben") appeared in the literary journal Neue Deutsche Zeitschrift, attributed to a writer using the pseudonym "Bob", and incorporating a prologue by Hugo von Hofmannsthal. Mimi was presented as a female counterpart to Arthur Schnitzler's character, Anatol. Mimi was seen as a great success. At the heart of the tale is a shy girl who becomes a self-assured woman, keen to enjoy life, and critical of her parents when they try to select a husband for her. One scene features the protagonist in an "amorous skirmish with a writer on a rowing boat, out at night on the Millstätter See". Publication of Mimi in the literary journal triggered ructions within the family and Hugo von Hofmannsthal was called upon to intervene with the publishers S. Fischer Verlag in order to prevent it from being published as a book.

Despite the rebellious tendencies evidenced in "Mimi", Clara submitted to her parents' wishes when she gave up writing and married at the Seitenstettengasse Temple (synagogue) on 10 May 1898. Her husband, Otto Pollaczek, was heir to the largest wholesaler of leather hides in the Habsburg monarchy. Their sons, Hermann and Karl Friedrich, were born in 1899 and 1902. The family lived in their own house alongside the Blumauergasse (street) in the city's second district. The marriage seems not to have been particularly happy: Pollaczek turned out to be unfaithful as a husband and during Clara's second pregnancy he took his mistress along for a summer vacation. The business found itself in financial difficulties during 1907 and after it failed, Otto Pollaczek took his own life on 17 April 1908. Clara was no longer able to live in the home they had shared, and was left with a no income and very few assets. Her financial position deteriorated further after the First World War because she had invested in War bonds. She had to sell her jewelry and leave her parents' home to which she had returned in 1918 after her mother died. The house was rented out and eventually, in 1928, sold. For a time she lived in a hotel, before moving into a small apartment in the eighteenth district, to the west of the university.

In order to support the family, in 1924 she returned to writing, also working as a translator. During the 1920s and 1930s she published stories, novellas and poems in the prestigious Neue Freie Presse (daily newspaper), as well as several serially published novels. She acquired a large number of committed readers.

Austria was subsumed into Germany in 1938. Germany had been governed by Nazis since 1933, according to the twin tenets of populism through the ages: hope and hatred. The hatred was focused on Communists and Jews, and took increasingly sinister and destructive forms. Clara Katharina Pollaczek was subject to antisemitic persecution. She may have owed her survival to her possession of a Czechoslovak passport, acquired as a result of the marriage to Pollaczek. Two days after German troops were welcomed by cheering crowds into Vienna marking Austria's incorporation into Nazi Germany, she crossed to Prague where she lived for a while. When, in 1939, the Germans completed their occupation of Czechoslovakia, she was visiting friends in Switzerland. She stayed in Switzerland, receiving financial support from relatives, till war ended in 1945. During this period she became a Roman Catholic. (The last practicing Jew in her family had been her grandfather.) In 1945 she joined her son Karl who had ended up in Gillingham in England, but he was married with children: the home was cramped and, unlike her younger son, Clara did not feel settled in England. It was her brother, the lawyer Otto Loeb, who organised her return to Vienna in 1948.

It proved impossible to resume her literary career. Literary contacts with whom she had worked before 1938 were dead or had emigrated permanently. Three years later, in 1951, she died after a long illness which, following her demise, was found to have been hitherto undiagnosed cancer. Her death notice appeared in the Neue Freie Presse of 25 July 1951. On 26 July 1951 her body was buried among those of other honoured citizens of the city in the Sieveringer interdenominational cemetery.

== Family tragedies and dispersals ==
Clara's elder son, Hermann, emigrated via Hamburg to Argentina in 1931. Her younger son, Karl, qualified as a physician. He was captured by the Gestapo but released. With his wife and daughter, on 20 June 1938 he fled to Switzerland, from where he made his way to Great Britain where he changed his name to Kary Pole. He produced an autobiography in 1982, entitled "Two halves of a Life". The book describes his mother's life as an exile in England during the Second World War.

According to the same book, his aunt, Clara's sister Anna, also pursued a literary career, but with less success than Clara. Anna was murdered at Theresienstadt. His uncle, Clara's brother Otto Loeb, became a lawyer and remained in Vienna. He survived the Nazi years, possibly because of a distinguished record of military service during the First World War. He was authorized to practice law as a "counsellor and legal advisor for Jews" ("Konsulent, zugelassen zur rechtlichen Beratung von Juden"). Clara's other brother, Alfred, became an artist and member of the Hagenbund. According to a 1939 lexicon he was, at that time, living in London. He died "in a monastery" in 1945.

== Arthur Schnitzler ==
Clara Loeb met Arthur Schnitzler at the end of 1896 during a New Year's Eve party held at her parents' house. Guests included leading artistic and literary figures of the time. She met Hugo von Hofmannsthal at the same event. Both men encouraged her to pursue her literary ambitions. Schnitzler later mentioned her in his diary as "the dear little girl with big eyes" ("das liebe kleine Mädel mit großen Augen"). They embarked upon a correspondence that lasted till Clara's marriage in 1898. In their letters they discussed literary issues. They met up frequently at family gatherings. They wrote of arranging to meet up in "nervous encounters" ("nervöse Zusammenkünfte"), although it is not clear whether or not they ever, at this point, met up except within the wider context of social events. Clara's parents disapproved of her friendship with Schnitzler, and of friendships with other men, and hastened to arrange her marriage with Pollaczek. During Clara's marriage the correspondence with Schnitzler was broken off.

The death of her husband in 1908 left Clara Katharina Pollaczek feeling liberated, according to her son's book. She had several male friendships before entering into a closer relationship with Schnitzler. Schnitzler's diaries disclose an exchange of letters, regular encounters, and even one telephone conversation from approximately 1915. After Schnitzler was divorced from Olga Gussmann, which took place in 1921, he and Pollaczek met one another far more frequently. There were theatre and museum visits and walks together in the city's parks. They also later travelled together, and frequently visited the cinema. At this time a sexual relationship outside marriage would have been taboo for a woman. That was one convention that Clara Pollaczek disregarded. She was 48 and Arthur Schnitzler 61, and suffering from Melancholia, when they became, for most purposes, life-partners. Between 1923 and Schnitzler's death in 1931, they were a couple. However, they did not actually live together and there is no evidence that either of them ever contemplated marriage.

After her husband's death in 1908, literary endeavour became a financial necessity for Pollaczek. She was permanently short of money, but did not wish to allow Schnitzler to provide her with financial support. In 1924 he gave her a typewriter for Christmas. He read almost everything she wrote and she also became a critic of his work, whose judgement and suggestions he valued.

Meanwhile Arthur Schnitzler had a number of other affairs which he tried to conceal from Pollaczek, and also remained in regular touch with his ex-wife and Lili, his daughter. Clara Katharina Pollaczek frequently complained that she was not sufficiently seen out with Schnitzler "in society", and was not identified as his "official mistress". Their relationship became increasingly defined by conflict—for instance, when Clara Pollaczek announced that she was anti-semitic. As Schnitzler recorded the exchange in his diary, this gave rise to a lengthy argument. Pollaczek had done nothing to conceal her Jewish provenance, while Schnitzler had plenty of opportunity to observe the uglier face of antisemitism in Vienna during the 1920s and early 30s. Despite the arguments, neither partner took the decision to end their relationship. Pollaczek noted in her diary, "he still keeps on insisting that he wants me and cannot let me go. He wants his freedom, he wants to be alone, and then he wants to be with me again, and somewhere in the world I should always be on hand for him, and no one is so important to him as I am" ("Er immer wieder, er will und kann mich nicht verlieren. Er will seine Freiheit, er will allein sein und dann auch wieder mit mir und ich soll irgendwo in der Welt immer irgendwo für ihn vorhanden sein und niemand bedeute ihm so viel wie ich.").

The more frequently they were apart the more frequently they attended the cinema together. Film choice was apparently indiscriminate, ranging from sentimental gimmicky productions to world acknowledged classics. Both Schnitzler and Pollaczek recalled approximately 500 of these cinema visits in their respective diaries between 1923 and 1931, providing insights into how different films were received by the public as well as the individual events surrounding their own cinema visits. From Pollaczek diary entries it appears that these cinema visits served a distractive function. During the final year of Schnitzler's life the two of them also discovered listening to the radio together as an alternative pastime.

Schnitzler's health problems and physical decline are also recorded in her diary. At the end she described his death on 21 October 1931: "I held his head in my hands till his last breath". A celebration of his life took place at the Burgtheater on 15 November 1931. Clara Katharina Pollaczek delivered the memorial address in the form of a five stanza poem that she had written for him.

== Output (selection) ==
Except where otherwise stated the stories and theatre pieces as well as some of the poems were published in the Neue Freie Presse

Theatre pieces

- Mimi. Schattenbilder aus einem Mädchenleben, Szenenfolge mit einem Prolog von Hugo von Hofmannsthal. In: Neue Deutsche Rundschau, 1. April 1897, S. 396–413. Wieder abgedruckt in: Hansjörg Graf (Hrsg.): Der kleine Salon. Szenen und Prosa des Wiener Fin de Siècle. Mit Illustrationen von Gustav Klimt. Henry-Goverts-Verlag, Stuttgart 1970, ISBN 978-3-7740-0381-1, S. 231–268
- Redoute. Schauspiel in einem Aufzug (1926)
- Dame. Drama (1930)

Novels

- Zwischen den Generationen (1920)
- Der Abhang (1924)
- Kind der Liebe. In: Neues Wiener Tagblatt 1926
- Die Schönheit der Konstanze (1929)
- Der Aufstieg (1929)
- Die Tochter des Hauses (1929),
- Zwischen den Generationen (1930)
- Mütter (1931)
- Zwischen den Generationen (1933)

Novellas and short stories

- Die Abschiedsfeier der Sybille Eugerth (1924)
- Der Tod der Gräfin Anastasia (1925)
- Der ewige Student (1925)
- Mädchen für Alles (1926)
- Mord (1927)
- Die Tochter des Hauses (1929)
- Das Fräulein von Corday d'Armont (1931)
- Die Kette (1932)

Poetry

- Abend (1926)
- Nach Sonnenuntergang (1927)
- Wissen um den Tod (1928)
- Im Aeroplan/Flug zu zweit (1929)
- Erinnerungsgang (Cottage 1933)
- Sein Zimmer (1934)
- Gedichte der Liebe. Europäischer Verlag, Wien, Leipzig 1936

Translation

- Paul Géraldy: Du und Ich (Toi et moi). Gedichte aus dem Französischen nachgedichtet von Clara Katharina Pollaczek, Zsolnay Verlag, Wien 1927

Memoire

- Arthur Schnitzler und Ich, 1896–1931, Vols 1-3. unpublished typescript (believed to have been intended for publication). Vienna 1931–1932
