= Kate Aitken =

Canadian radio and television broadcaster

- Born: April 6, 1891; Beeton, Ontario, Canada
- Died: December 11, 1971 (aged 80); Mississauga, Ontario, Canada
- Resting place: Beeton United Church Cemetery
- Occupation: Broadcaster

Kate Aitken (April 6, 1891 – December 11, 1971) was a Canadian radio and television broadcaster in the 1930s, 1940s and 1950s. Sometimes known by the nickname Mrs. A, she was one of the most famous female broadcasters of her era. In addition, she was known as an expert on cooking; she gave many public talks and demonstrations, and her advice was relied upon by millions of homemakers.

== Early life ==
Kate Aitken, born Kate May Scott, was the fifth of seven children of Anne (née Kennedy) and Robert Scott; she was born in the village of Beeton, Ontario. Her parents owned a general store; years later, in 1956, she wrote a memoir about her childhood in Beeton, called Never a Day So Bright. From the time she was little, she enjoyed cooking: she once joked that she was born "with a mixing spoon in my hand." At twelve-years old, Kate sold cosmetics door-to-door on a bicycle. She then became a teacher when she was fourteen; she later got enough credits for a teaching certificate and moved to Saskatchewan; she returned to Ontario several years later to help her mother run the general store. In October 1914, she married a local businessman named Henry Mundell Aitken. Kate and Henry subsequently had two children, Mary and Anne. At the time of their marriage, Henry was working as a clerk at a local bank; but several years later, he and Kate bought a poultry farm. Kate also began a canning business. Although she had little experience with farming, she had immersed herself in every book and government publication she could find, and soon acquired enough expertise to begin giving talks about such topics as raising fruits and vegetables for the Ontario Department of Agriculture. She and her husband also became known locally for the success of their poultry farm: by 1924, they had about 600 egg-laying hens.

== Homemaking expert ==
As was the custom in the early 1900s, newspapers generally referred to her as "Mrs. Henry Aitken" or "Mrs. H.M. Aitken"; it was rare for her first name to be used. But she had begun to become well known for her homemaking and farm management skills, and women's page reporters in Toronto were praising her as a "practical farm business woman." In 1923, she set up a "Country Kitchen" in the Women's Building of the Canadian National Exhibition (CNE) in Toronto, where she gave talks about canning and preserving, while selling some of her own home-made jams and baked goods. Until 1928, she worked for the Ontario Department of Agriculture speaking to rural women about farming. She subsequently taught cooking, at the Canadian National Exhibition, where she was named the director of the Women's Activities in early 1939. She continued in that role for the next thirteen years. Beginning in the 1920s, she became known for her recipes, which she first published as pamphlets or booklets. Throughout the 1920s and 1930s, her cooking talks were extremely popular: some of her classes at the CNE drew several thousand people, both men and women. Rural farm women found her especially helpful, since she understood their situation and was able to offer them helpful hints about managing their household more effectively. While serving as director of women's activities for the CNE, she became known for creating unique displays for the Exhibition, such as persuading the British government to allow one of Queen Elizabeth's famous dresses to be shown. She was also known for booking guest appearances by celebrities and dignitaries: among them was former American first lady Eleanor Roosevelt, who gave a 1951 talk at the Exhibition that was also carried by the CBC. Mrs. Aitken finally resigned from her position in November 1952.

Kate Aitken also served as supervisor of conservation for the Consumers Branch, Wartime Prices and Trade Board during World War II. In August 1945, she took a six-week tour of the British Isles and the Continent at the invitation of the British Ministry of Food. The goal of the tour was to learn how Canadian women could help alleviate food shortages in the UK.

== Career in broadcasting ==
Kate Aitken was offered a radio show in 1934, when a broadcaster at CFRB in Toronto broke her leg and the station manager needed an emergency replacement. The show was syndicated to other radio stations, and was eventually picked up by the Canadian Broadcasting Corporation in 1948. By the 1940s, she had become one of CFRB's most popular broadcasters, and newspapers abandoned the custom of referring to her by as Mrs. Henry Aitken; they began using her radio name, Kate Aitken, all the time. Her radio programs were also profitable for CFRB: she was able to get her own sponsors, and she proved that a daytime show aimed mainly at home-makers could gain a wide following. While most of her fans were women, among the many people who wrote to get her advice, 18% of the letters came from men. Throughout much of her radio career, Aitken was heard three times during the day; in 1950, an estimated 32 per cent of Canadians listening to the radio were tuned into her show whenever she was on the air; estimated to be up to three million listeners. She was so popular that she received 260,000 letters, 150 speeches during the course of a year and 22 secretaries to manage the workload. She also became an expert at getting interviews for her broadcasts; sometimes, she spoke with interesting local people who were in the news, but she also traveled overseas to get interviews with famous news-makers, including one with Benito Mussolini. In fact, when she first met him in 1927, she was said to have persuaded him to place an order for Canadian wheat.

On radio, Kate Aitken primarily covered homemaking subjects such as cooking and etiquette. In TV's early years, she was a panelist on talk shows, including a 1952 program called Fighting Words. But sometimes, she did some documentary journalism, including a profile of Hungarian refugees in 1956. Also, in an era when research was difficult and time consuming, Aitken would find answers to difficult questions, explaining to one Saskatoon woman the procedures for moving herself and her assets to the USA to be with her American husband. When not covering homemaking, she also interviewed powerful world leaders: in addition to Mussolini, she spoke with Adolf Hitler, King George VI, Mackenzie King, Franklin D. Roosevelt and Lester Pearson. By some estimates, she made more than 9,500 broadcasts during her radio career.

She retired from broadcasting unexpectedly in 1957, even though her radio shows were still popular. But she did not slow her pace: she continued to work for UNICEF, and in 1958, she was named to the CBC's board of directors. One of her projects at the CBC was to conduct a survey of the audience's likes and dislikes. Beginning in the late 1950s, and continuing until 1962, she was a columnist for the Globe & Mail, offering her opinions about fashion, food, raising children, and current trends in society that affected the home. She also gave advice to homemakers about etiquette, such as a column on using the telephone: taking calls during dinner was always to be avoided, she wrote. Additionally, she continued to write cookbooks: by some accounts, she wrote or contributed to more than fifty of them, several of which became Canadian best-sellers.

Kate Aitken died in Mississauga in 1971, at age 81, having lived for many years on property that she ran briefly as a spa, on a bend of Mississauga Road, south of Streetsville. She is buried in Beeton United Church Cemetery.

== Legacy ==
In June 1973, 1,000 people gathered in Beeton Park, New Tecumseth, Canada as the Beeton Women's Institute placed a plaque in memory of Aitken. A number of contemporary historians, including culinary expert Elizabeth Driver, have compared her to Martha Stewart, for her popularity and the high esteem in which she was held by homemakers and people who loved to cook. One of Kate's cookbooks, Kate Aitken's Canadian cook book, which was first issued in 1945, remains popular even now; it was reissued in 2004, and Elizabeth Driver wrote the introduction.

== Books ==
- Kate Aitken Ogilvie Cook Book (1950), Ogilvie Flour Mills Home Service Department
- Lovely You (1951), Collins White Circle
- Canadian Etiquette for Daily Living (1953), Tamblyn Edition
- Kate Aitken's: It's Fun Raising a Family (1955), Tamblyn Edition
- Never a Day So Bright (1956), Longmans
- Making your Living is Fun (1959), Longmans
- Kate Aitken's Cook Book: The All-Time Favourite Canadian Cook Book (1962), HarperCollins Publishers Canada, Limited
