= Gertrude Minnie Faulding =

English writer

Gertrude Minnie Faulding (1875 – 26 December 1961) was an English children's writer and novelist born in London. She collaborated with Lucy Hanson Dale, a writer of history textbooks, on "two novels of romance and marriage with unusually independent heroines".

== Life ==
London-born Gertrude Minnie Faulding was schooled in Switzerland and Germany, and then read modern languages at Somerville College, Oxford. She later worked as a language coach alongside her writing. Little else is known of her private life.

== Works ==
Faulding had two children's books of illustrated fantasies published: Old Man's Beard and Other Tales and a book of verse entitled Nature Children. A Flower Book for Little Folks.

She followed these with Fairies (Fellowship Books, 1913), a short study of magicality in such tales, which was reprinted by Dodo Press (London, 2009). In it she put forward the idea that "belief [in fairies] is with most of us like a little plant, open to the morning sun, shivering gaily in the winds of life; scorched some times, and sometimes almost uprooted and vanishing away; yet ready always to blossom again at the stirring of ecstasy or the breath of an enchanted air."

Faulding's two novels were co-written with another Somerville graduate, Lucy Dale. Time's Wallet (1913) consists of letters between Somerville graduates who are working in the East End of London. One of them breaks off her engagement rather than ceasing to think for herself. Merely Players (1917) follows an unconventional playwright through the break-up of her marriage to a civil servant. The protagonists in both can be seen as unusually independent heroines.
