= Ernestina Lecuona =

Cuban pianist, music educator and composer (1882–1951)

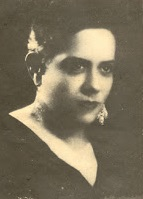
- Born: Ernestina Lecuona y Casado; January 16, 1882; Matanzas, Cuba
- Died: September 3, 1951 (aged 69); Havana, Cuba
- Occupations: Pianist, music educator and composer

Ernestina Lecuona y Casado (16 January 1882 – 3 September 1951) was a Cuban pianist, music educator and composer.

== Life ==
Ernestina Lecuona y Casado was born in Matanzas into a musical family. Her brother was pianist and composer Ernesto Lecuona. Leo Brouwer, a classical guitarist, is her grandson, and gymnast-political scientist Rafael A. Lecuona, an anti-communist, was her nephew. She studied music at the Centro Asturiano de La Habana and with French teacher Lucía Calderón.

At the age of 15, Lecuona completed her first work Habanera Luisa, which was published widely in Cuba and Spain by Anselmo López in 1897. She gave early music lessons to her younger brother Ernesto. In 1936 she was invited to New York City by the Pan American Union, where she accompanied the Mexican tenor Tito Guizar. She made contact with singer Jessica Dragonette, who added some of Lecuona's works to her repertoire.

In 1937 she founded a women's orchestra in Cuba, which debuted at the Teatro Alkazar, and in 1938 performed in concerts at the National Theatre. In 1939 she toured Mexico, Chile and Argentina, and traveled in South America again from 1940 to 1942. She traveled with her brother on tour, and sometimes played a duo for four hands with him at radio stations and concert venues, including Carnegie Hall in 1948. She died in Havana.

== Works ==
Selected works include:

- Bolero
- Amarte es mi destino
- Anhelo besarte
- Mi sueño eres tú
- Mi vida es soñar
- No lo dudes
- ¿Por qué me dejaste?
- Te has cansado de mi amor
- ú serás en mis noches
- Tus besos de pasión
- Ya que te vas
- Canción-bolero
- Ahora que eres mío
- Te has cansado de mi amor
- Canción
