= Sachin Sengupta =

Indian writer

- Born: 20 July 1891; Senhati, Khulna, British India (now in Bangladesh)
- Died: 5 March 1961 (Age 69); Shyambazar, Calcutta, West Bengal, India
- Occupation: playwright
- Notable work: Sirajdullah

Sachindranath Sengupta (1891–1961), also known as Sachin Sengupta, was a prominent Bengali playwright and the producer and director of theatrical plays in Calcutta, India.

== Works ==
His works include the dramatization of the works of poets Rabindranath Tagore and Kazi Nazrul Islam. Some of his famous plays include- Raktakamal, Rashtrabirohi, Desher dabi. Sirajdullah was his most famous work. It was staged both as a Natak and Jatra all over Bengal and was very popular among the contemporary Bengali society. He had travelled Russia, China, Ceylon etc. as the part of the non governmental troupe. He died on 5 March 1961 (Bhupen Bose Avenue, Kolkata).
