= Gustav Cords =

Gustav Cords (German: [ˈɡʊstaf ˈkɔʁts]; 12 October 1870 in Hamburg – 18 February 1951 in Berlin) was a German composer.

== Biography ==
Cords studied composition in Hamburg, Sondershausen, and Wiesbaden from 1887 to 1891, under the tutelage of Hugo Riemann. He was one of Riemann's top students during Max Reger's time as well, as both Cords and Reger were students of Riemann. From 1911 to 1919, he served as the president of the General German Musicians' Union, which later merged with the Central Union of Civilian Musicians in Germany to form the German Musicians' Union. Following this, he became a chamber musician for the Berlin State Opera. On October 1, 1932 he joined the Nazi Party (membership number 1,339,809). Cords is known for his opera, Sonnwendnacht (Solstice Night).
