= The Doll and One Other =

1946 collection of novelettes by Algernon Blackwood

- Dust-jacket illustration by Ronald Clyne for The Doll and One Other
- Author: Algernon Blackwood
- Cover artist: Ronald Clyne
- Language: English
- Genre: fantasy, horror
- Publisher: Arkham House
- Publication date: 1946
- Publication place: United States
- Media type: Print (hardback)
- Pages: 138 pp

The Doll and One Other is a collection of two fantasy and horror novelettes by author Algernon Blackwood. It was released in 1946 and was the first publication of either novelette. It was published by Arkham House in an edition of 3,490 copies.

The first novelette, "The Doll", was adapted for an episode of the television show Night Gallery. It was also adapted for the December 24, 1944, episode of old time radio show The Weird Circle.

James Agate Jr adapted the story for CBS Radio Mystery Theatre (ep. 1224 - July 22, 1981) under the title Toy Death starring Kristoffer Tabori and Patricia Elliott.

== Contents ==
The Doll and One Other contains the following tales:

1. "The Doll"
2. "The Trod"
