= Ebbe Hamerik =

Danish composer

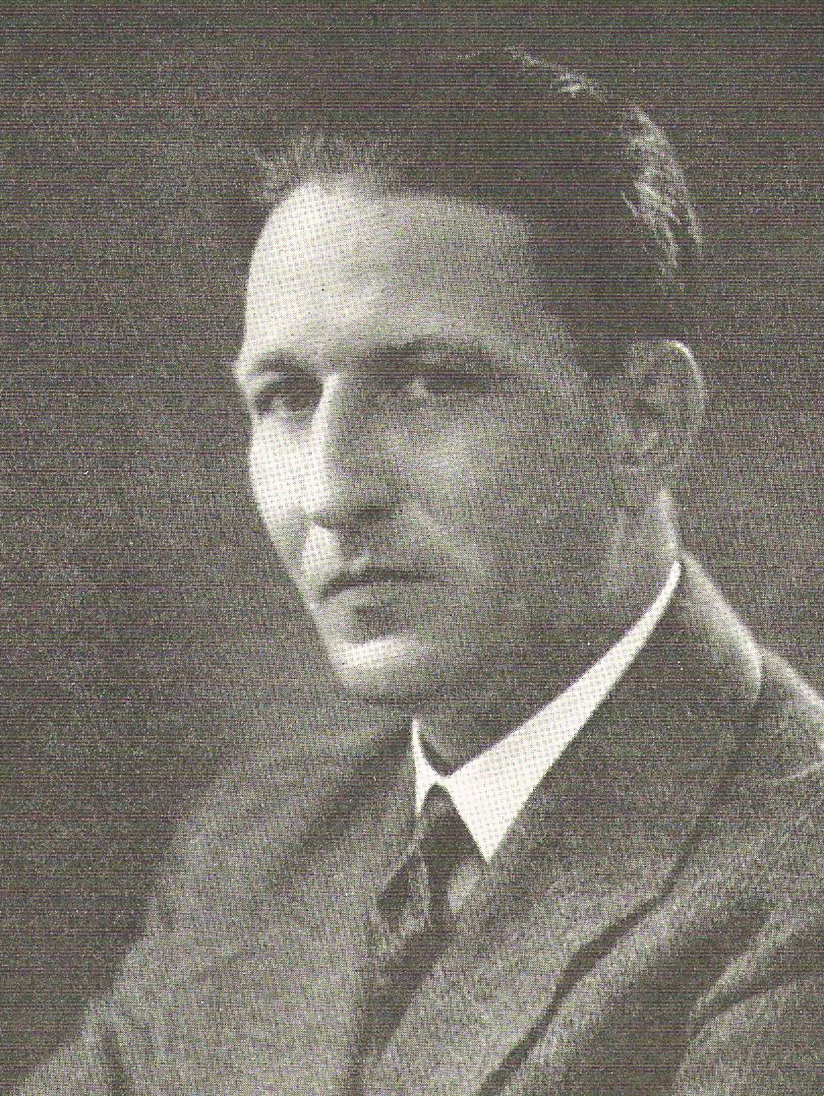

Ebbe Hamerik (5 September 1898 – 12 August 1951) was a Danish composer. Born in Frederiksberg, he was the son of composer Asger Hamerik. He died at the age of 52 in Kattegat when his sailboat sank and he drowned.

Notable operas include Stepan (1922), Leonardo da Vinci: 4 Scener af hans Liv (1930), Marie Grubbe, inspired by the life of Marie Grubbe, (1940), Rejsekammeraten (eventyropera 1943) and Drømmerne (1949).

In 1939, he participated as a volunteer on the Finnish side in the Winter War, a war between the Soviet Union and Finland.

== See also ==
- List of Danish composers

== Sources ==
- Niels Schiørring: Musikkens historie i Danmark (1978)
- Eva Hvidt, Ebbe Hamerik, Multivers, 140 pages (2024)
