= Kitawaki Noboru =

Japanese painter and writer (1901–1951)

Kitawaki Noboru (Japanese: 北脇昇; June 4, 1901 – December 18, 1951) was an avant-garde Japanese painter and writer.

== Biography ==
Kitawaki was born in Nagoya, but spent most of his life in Kyoto. He took a nine-year hiatus from his artistic career when he was drafted into the military. During this time he also got married. In 1951, he died from tuberculosis.

== Career ==
Kitawaki began studying yōga at a private art school under Kanokogi Takeshiro in 1919.

In 1930, he studied at another art school run by proletarian painter Seifū Tsuda, where he further practiced western-style painting, landscape, and figure painting. He also contributed works for exhibition to two art associations: the Nikakai and Dokuristu bijitsu kyokai.

Kitawaki became a founder of the Bijutsu Bunka Kyōkai (Art culture association) in 1939.

== Style ==
Kitawaki worked mainly in the style of Japanese surrealism, automatism, proletarian art, and later Constructivism in the late 1930s. Rather than dreams and psychoanalysis that distinctly marks European surrealism, the Japanese surrealism that Noboru showed in his work focused on the pairing of opposites: "nature and the supernatural, reality and hyper-reality". For Kitawaki, this style served two main purposes. One was to give insight to his own experiences. Through surrealism, he could offer critique on a society that had undergone the effects of both world wars. The other was to understand and interpret the order and structures of natural phenomena that already existed within reality. For this he painted surrealist diagrams in which he included information from areas of science and philosophy that he believed to best give an explanation for these things. These included morphology, physics, mathematics, color theory, and Chinese divination. Within many of his paintings he also utilized the combination of an open space or landscape with various other forms, usually biological or zoomorphic figures that served to represent other structures. This can be seen for example in his 1937 painting View of a Shell , where the macroscopic depiction of two barnacle shells appear as mountains in an underwater seascape.

== Selected paintings ==
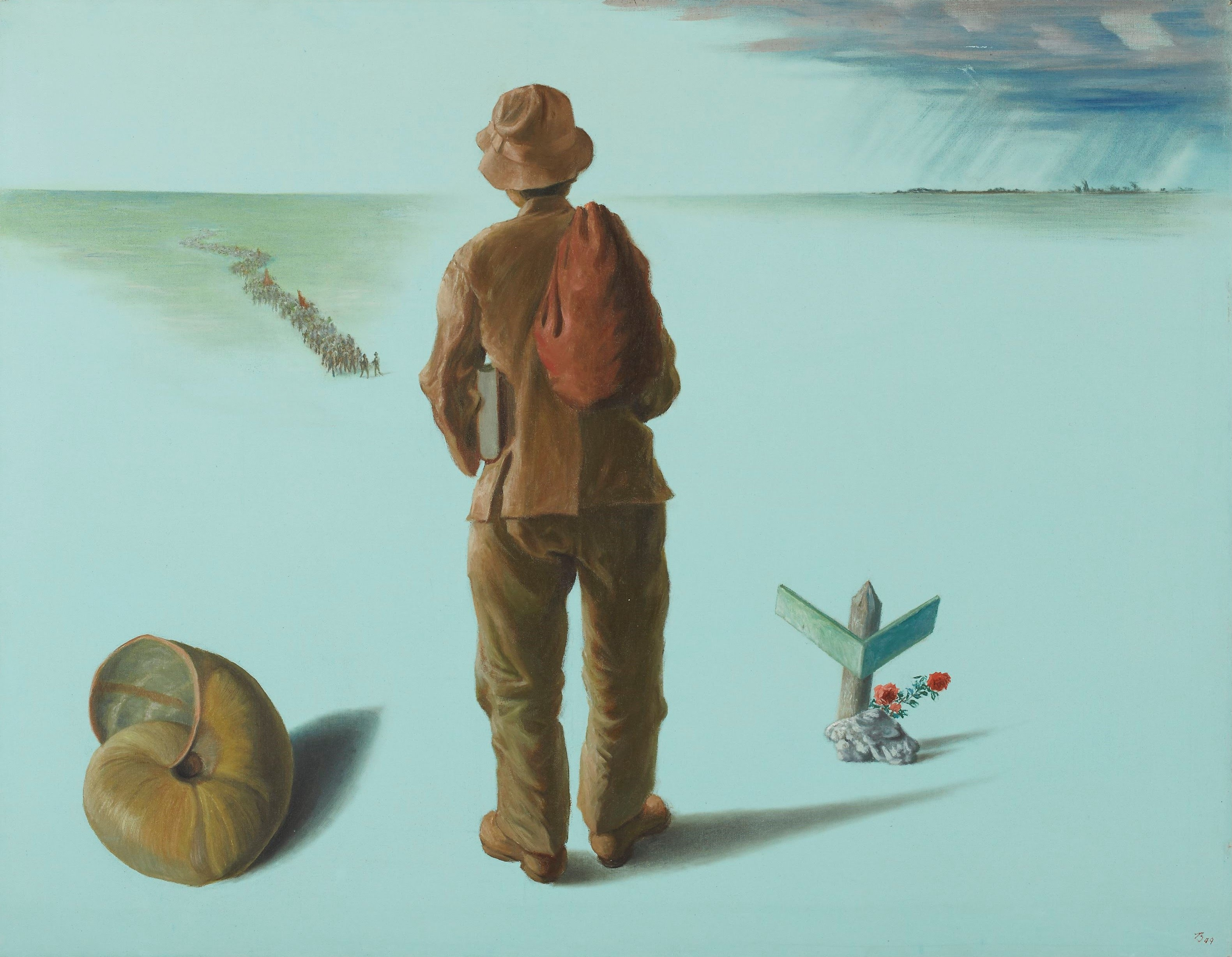
Quo Vadis (クォ・ヴァディス), 1949. Depiction of a soldier at a crossroads of an uncertain future for Japan as a nation after the end of World War II.

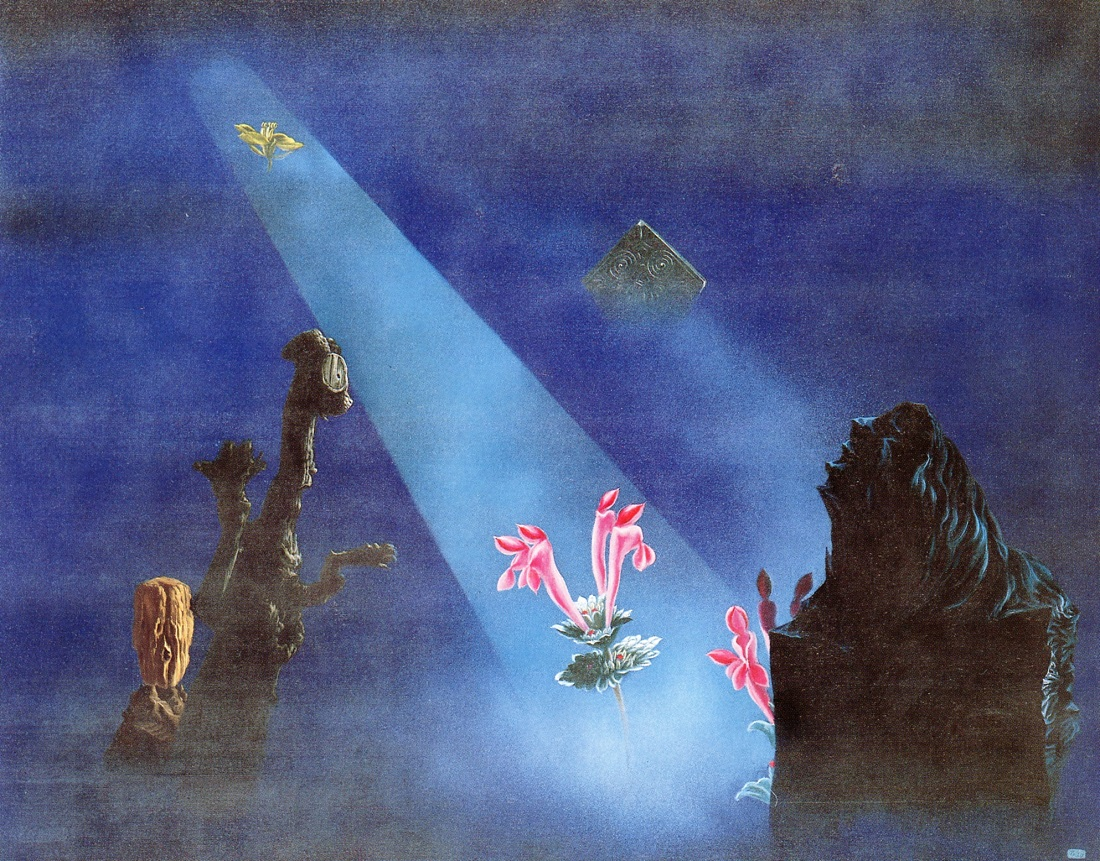
For a Sleepless Night, 1937

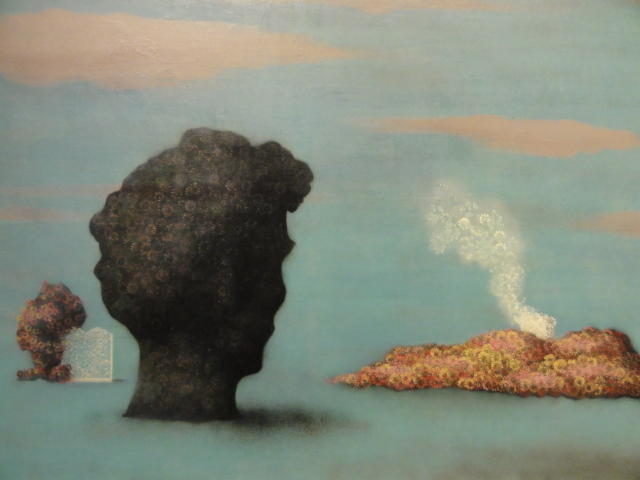
Surrealistic Sight at Autumn, 1945

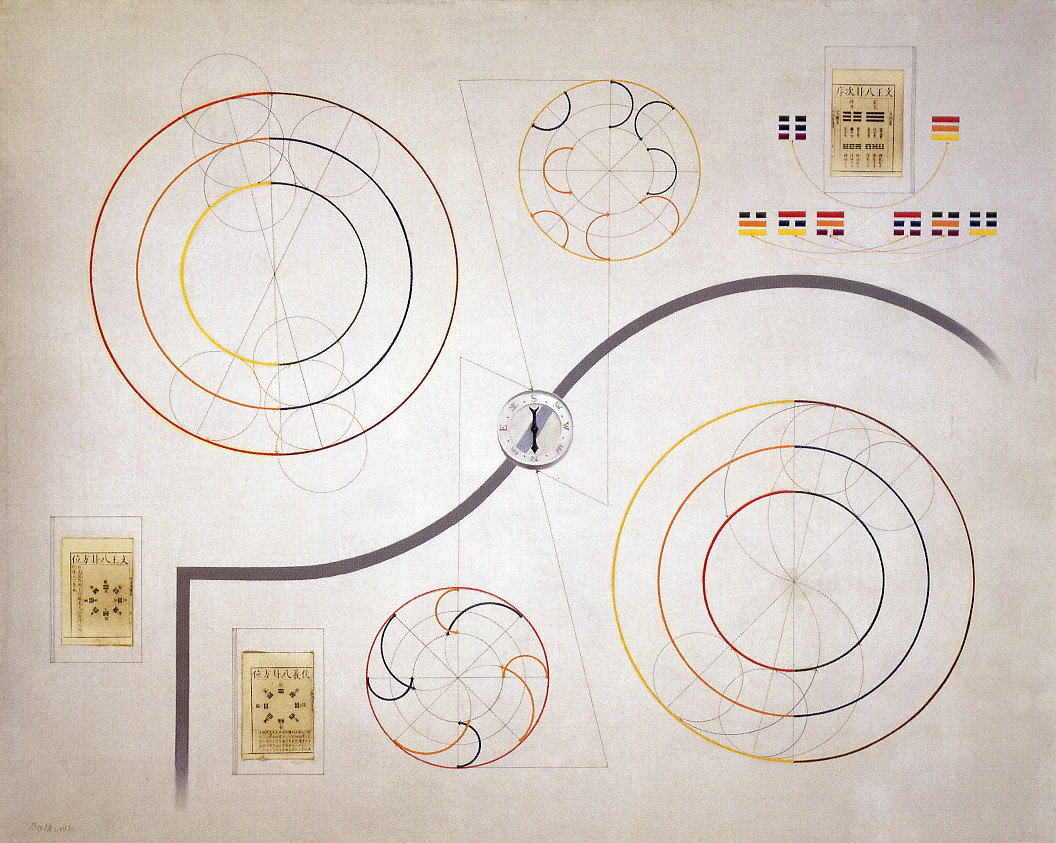
Diagram of the Chou Divination, 1941

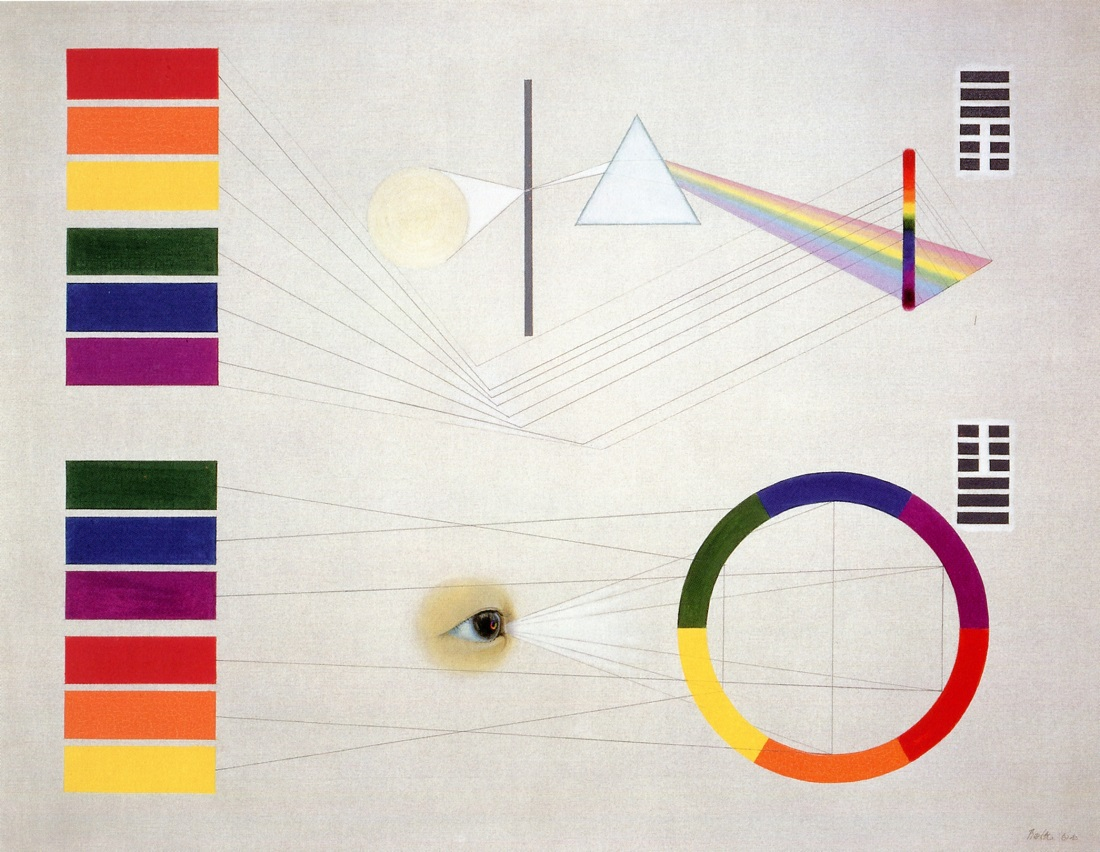
Analysis, Yi-king, 1941
