= Ya'qoub Al-Oudat =

Jordanian scholar (1909–1971)

Al Badawi Al Mulatham
- Born: Yaqoub Al Oudat; 1909; Al Karak, Vilayet of Syria, Ottoman Empire
- Died: 23 September 1971 (aged 61–62)

Al-Badawi al-Mulaththum (Arabic: البدوي الملثم, "The Veiled Bedouin") was the pen name used by Ya'qoub Al Oudat, a pioneer of thought and literature in Jordan, writer, thinker, scholar, historian, storyteller and a translator. Famous for writing a biography of Mustafa Wahbi et-Tull, a Jordanian poet known by his pseudonym Arar.

== Early life ==
Yaqoub was born in Al Karak in Jordan in 1909, and his father Hanna was the first mayor of Karak during the Turkish rule, his mother is Hadba Jaber Al Odat.

== Education ==
When Al Oudat's father died, he stopped attending school and transferred to the Secondary School of Irbid. Al Oudat completed his primary education at the School of Roman Orthodoxy and Al Maaref School. He finished his secondary education in 1931. Al Oudat wished to pursue his graduate studies in Law at the Damascus University but his limited financial resources prevented him to continue his education.

== Career ==
After graduating from high school, Al Oudat was appointed as a teacher in Amman, he taught Arabic literature and history, he then moved to teach in Jerash and Ramthawhere he continued teaching for six years.

He began writing and publishing his articles in 1926 in newspapers and magazines in Jordan, Syria and Egypt, with the signatures of aliases like (Abu Baroud), (Hammad Al Badawi), (Abu Natharat), (Nawaf), (Fata Muab), (Fata Al Badeya) and finally Al Badawi Al Mulatham (Literally in Arabic The Veiled Bedouin after a bedouin camel rider he glanced in Amman.

Al Oudat died by heart attack on 23 September 1971.
