= Heinz von Lichberg =

German noble (1890–1951)

Heinz von Lichberg, real name Heinz von Eschwege (born 1890 in Marburg, died March 14, 1951, in Lübeck) was a German author and journalist, remembered chiefly for his 1916 short story Lolita. It has been argued that Vladimir Nabokov based his 1955 novel of the same name on Lichberg's story. The story was published in a collection of 15 short stories titled Die verfluchte Gioconda (The Accursed Gioconda).

Born to a family of Hessian nobility, he chose the pen name of Heinz von Lichberg after Leuchtberg near Eschwege, where many battles had been fought. He served in the cavalry during the First World War, and after the war worked as a journalist and author in Berlin. He reported from Graf Zeppelin during its record-breaking flight around the world in 1929, earning a name as a foreign correspondent. He became a member of the Nazi Party in 1933 and worked as a radio journalist and a culture journalist with the Völkischer Beobachter. He left the Nazi Party in 1938 and rejoined the military during the Second World War, serving in the Abwehr military intelligence department. After the war, he settled in Lübeck, where he worked for a Lübeck newspaper and died in 1951.

Lichberg was mostly forgotten, until literary scholar Michael Maar came across his "Lolita" short story and argued in several articles and a 2005 book that Nabokov had derived his story from Lichberg's work.

In Lichberg's "Lolita", the story takes place in Spain.

== Publications ==
- Die verfluchte Gioconda, Darmstadt, Falken-Verlag, 1916, 196 pages
- Das deutsche Herz, Berlin, Stilke, 1917, 134 pages
