= Saralabala Sarkar =

Indian Bengali Writer (1875–1961)

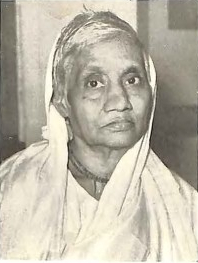
- Born: 10 December 1875; Katalpora, Nadia District, Bengal Presidency, British Raj
- Died: 1 December 1961 (aged 85); Calcutta, West Bengal, India
- Occupation: Writer

Saralabala Sarkar (10 December 1875 – 1 December 1961) was an Indian Bengali writer.

== Early life ==
Saralabala Sarkar was born on 10 December 1875 in Katalpora, Nadia District, Bengal Presidency, British Raj. Her ancestral house was in Bhar Ramdia, Faridpur District, Bengal Presidency. She was home schooled. She was married to Sarat Chandra Sarkar when she was twelve years old. Her husband died when she was twenty-three. Her grandmother was Shreemati Rasasundari, a writer herself, notable for her autobiography that provided a keen insight into the life of a 19th-century Bengali housewife.

== Career ==
Saralabala Sarkar was a writer and started writing more extensively after the death of her husband. She was involved in British Indian politics to a limited extent. She served as a Member of the Women Satyagraha Samity part of the Satyagraha movement in British India. She published her books of poetry, Prabaha in 1904 and Arghya in 1938. She also provided shelter to pro-independence activist at her home. In 1953, she became the first women to be appointed the Girish Chandra Ghosh Lecturer at the University of Calcutta. She also published her memoir, Harano Atit, in 1953. She wrote a number of essays, poets, and short stories which were published in journals like the Antahpur, Bharatbarsa, Jahnabi, Prabasi, Suprabhat, Sahitya Pradip, Utsaha among others. Her collected essays were published in Manusyatver Sadhana and Sahitya Jijvasa in 1953. She published Swami Vivekananda O Sriramakrishva Sangha and Galpa Sangraha in 1957. She wrote about her grandmother, Shreemati Rasasundari, in the book Amar Thakuma.

== Death ==
Saralabala Sarkar died on 1 December 1961.
