= Godofredo Rangel =

Brazilian writer

- Born: José Godofredo de Moura Rangel; 1864; Três Corações, Brazil
- Died: 1951 (aged 86–87)
- Writing career
- Subjects: Culture and history of Minas Gerais
- Notable work: Vida Ociosa

José Godofredo de Moura Rangel (1864-1951) was a Brazilian writer.

He was born in Três Corações city, state of Minas Gerais, in 1884. He was friend of Monteiro Lobato. Godofredo Rangel was a regionalist writer who wrote about culture and history of Minas Gerais, his native land. He died in 1951.

== Bibliography ==
- Falange Gloriosa, 1917
- Vida Ociosa, 1920
- Andorinhas, 1921
- A Filha, 1929
- Os Humildes, 1944
- Os Bem Casados, ?
