= Abdul Jabbar Jomard =

58th Iraqi Minister of Foreign Affairs

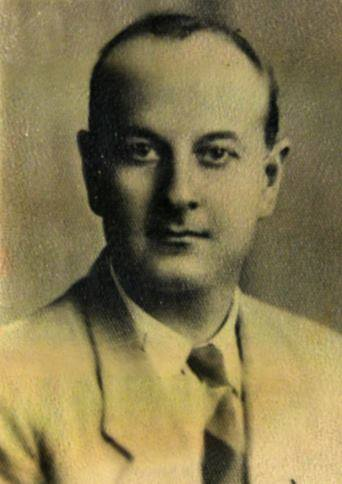
Abdul Jabbar Jomard

Abdul Jabbar Jomard (Arabic: عبد الجبار الجومرد; December 1909 in Mosul – November 30, 1971 in Mosul) was Iraqi Foreign Minister who served from 1958 to 1959.

Political offices
Preceded by Burhan Alden Aaian	Foreign Minister of Iraq; 1958–1959	Succeeded by Hashim Jwad
