= William Troy (educator) =

American writer and teacher (1903–1961)

William Troy (July 11, 1903 – May 26, 1961) was an American writer and teacher. He was married to poet and teacher Léonie Adams.

He won the U.S. National Book Award in Arts and Letters for his Selected Essays (1967).

== Life and career ==
Troy was born in Chicago and grew up in suburban Oak Park. He attended Loyola Academy (in Wilmette) for high school. He sold his first review to a newspaper while still in high school. Later, he attended Yale University.

After graduating from Yale he taught for one year at the University of New Hampshire and then attended graduate school at Columbia University. He taught at several universities and colleges throughout his life, including New York University, Bennington College, and New School University. He was a popular teacher and lecturer on James Joyce and Shakespeare.

Throughout the 1930s and 1940s, Troy was a regular literary and film critic for The Nation, but he published essays, reviews, and poems in various journals.

== Marriage ==
He married poet Léonie Adams in 1933.

== Death ==
Troy died of cancer of the larynx on May 26, 1961.

== Works ==
Selected Essays (1967).

== Sources ==
- William Troy: Selected Essays. Hyman, Stanley E., Allen Tate. Rutgers University Press; ISBN 0-8135-2686-8, ISBN 978-0-8135-2686-7
