= 2002 in public domain =

When a work's copyright expires, it enters the public domain. The following is a list of works that entered the public domain in 2002. Since laws vary globally, the copyright status of some works are not uniform.

== Entered the public domain in countries with life + 70 years ==
With the exception of Belarus (Life + 50 years) and Spain (Life + 80 years for creators that died before 1987), a work enters the public domain in Europe 70 years after the creator's death, if it was published during the creator's lifetime. The list is sorted alphabetically and includes a notable work of the creator that entered the public domain on January 1, 2002.

Names	Country	Birth	Death	Occupation	Notable work
L. Adams Beck	United Kingdom	1862	3 January 1931	fantasy writer, novelist, short story writer, biographer, esotericist	The Openers of The Gate and Other Stories of the Occult, The Splendour of Asia: The Story and Teaching of the Buddha, The Way of Power: Studies in the Occult, The Divine Lady: A Romance of Nelson and Emma Hamilton, The Thunderer: A Romance of Napoleon and Joséphine
Henry Gauthier-Villars	France	8 August 1859	12 January 1931	novelist, music critic, literary editor	Co-writer and editor of the novel series Claudine in collaboration with his wife Colette, marketed a line of dolls based on the novels.
Graça Aranha	Brazil	21 June 1868	26 January 1931	modernist writer, novelist, dramatist, essayist, diplomat, judge	Canaã, Malazarte, Estética da Vida (An Aesthetics of Life)
Ida B. Wells	United States	16 July 1862	25 March 1931	investigative journalist, sociologist, educator	Southern Horrors: Lynch Law in all its Phases, The Red Record: Tabulated Statistics and Alleged Causes of Lynching in the United States, Crusade for Justice: The Autobiography of Ida B. Wells
Arnold Bennett	United Kingdom	27 May 1867	27 March 1931	novelist, short story writer, dramatist, diarist	Anna of the Five Towns, The Old Wives' Tale, The Clayhanger Family, Riceyman Steps
André Michelin	France	16 January 1853	4 April 1931	industrialist, engineer	Eponymous founder and publisher of the guide book series Michelin Guide
Kahlil Gibran	United States	6 January 1883	10 April 1931	poet, visual artist, philosopher	The Prophet, The Madman, The Earth Gods
Nérée Beauchemin	Canada	20 February 1850	29 June 1931	poet	Les Floraisons Matutinales (The Morning Blossoming), Patrie intime: Harmonies (Intimate Homeland: Harmonies)
Harald Høffding	Denmark	11 March 1843	2 July 1931	philosopher, theologian, university professor	Søren Kierkegaard as Philosopher, Den nyere Filosofis Historie (History of Modern Philosophy), Psychology, the Problems of Philosophy, Philosophy of Religion
Vasile Cijevschi	Romania	17 October 1880	14 July 1931	Orientalist, nationalist politician, polemicist, journalist	Founder and owner of the Russian-language newspaper Golos Kishinyova, editor of the regional Russian-language newspaper Nashe Slovo (Our Word), wrote the short story Unei prietene (To a Lady Friend)
Bertha McNamara	Australia	28 September 1853	1 August 1931	labour activist, political writer, bookseller	Home Talk on Socialism, Commercialism and Distribution of the Nineteenth Century, Forgery and Workingmen's Homes, How to Become Rich Beyond the Dreams of Avarice, Shylock Exposed
Delfín Chamorro	Paraguay	24 December 1863	15 August 1931	language teacher, grammarian, poet	Grammar Castellana
Frank Harris	United States	14 February 1856	26 August 1931	memoirist, novelist, short story writer, publisher, editor	My Life and Loves, The Bomb, The Man Shakespeare and his Tragic Life Story, The Veils of Isis, and Other Stories, Oscar Wilde, His Life and Confessions, My Reminiscences as a Cowboy
Hall Caine	United Kingdom	14 May 1853	31 August 1931	novelist, dramatist, short story writer, poet, critic, World War I-era propagandist	The Christian, She's All the World to Me: A Novel, The Manxman, The Master of Man: The Story of a Sin, The Woman of Knockaloe: A Parable
Sue A. Sanders	United States	25 March 1842	8 September 1931	teacher, social leader, diarist	A journey to on and from the "golden shore"
Matilda Cugler-Poni	Romania	2 April 1851	9 September 1931	poet, short story writer, comedy writer	Unei tinere fete (To a Young Girl), Un tutor
Jane Meade Welch	United States	11 March 1854	30 September 1931	historian, journalist	The War of 1812, John Quincy Adams and Andrew Jackson, The Territorial Development of the United States, The Marking of Historic Sites on the Niagara Frontier
Ernst Didring	Sweden	18 October 1868	13 October 1931	naturalist writer, novelist, leader of the Swedish Red Cross	Malm (iron ore), Grålöga—Trilogin (former life in the Stockholm archipelago), Världsspindeln (The World's Spider), Det mörkblå frimärket (The Dark Blue Stamp)
Arthur Schnitzler	Austria	15 May 1862	21 October 1931	Modernist writer, novelist, dramatist	Professor Bernhardi, Der Weg ins Freie (The Road into the Open), Reigen, Fräulein Else
Lucas Malet	United Kingdom	4 June 1852	27 October 1931	novelist, short story writer, ghost story writer, fiction writer about sadomasochism	The Wages of Sin, The History of Sir Richard Calmady, Colonel Enderby's Wife, The Gateless Barrier
Juan Zorrilla de San Martín	Uruguay	28 December 1855	3 November 1931	poet	Tabaré, La leyenda patria (The Fatherland Legend), Himno al Arbol (Hymn to the Tree)
Ole Edvart Rølvaag	United States	22 April 1876	5 November 1931	novelist	Giants in the Earth, Peder Seier (Peder Victorious), Den Signede Dag (Their Father's God)
Xu Zhimo	China	15 January 1897	19 November 1931	poet, translator, founder of the literary society Crescent Moon Society	Zaibie Kangqiao (Taking Leave of Cambridge Again)
Vachel Lindsay	United States	10 November 1879	5 December 1931	poet, illustrator, writer on film criticism	The Art of the Moving Picture, Rhymes To Be Traded For Bread, The Jazz Birds, The Congo, Every Soul A Circus
Enrico Corradini	Italy	20 July 1865	10 December 1931	novelist, dramatist, essayist, journalist, nationalist political writer	Il volere d'Italia (Italy's Desire), L'ora di Tripoli (Tripoli's Moment), La patria lontana (The Distant Fatherland), La guerra lontana (The Distant War), Julius Caesar: A Play in Five Acts
Melvil Dewey	United States	10 December 1851	26 December 1931	librarian, educator, founder of the Columbia University School of Library Service	eponymous creator of the Dewey Decimal system of library classification, founder and editor of the Library Journal, writer of Librarianship as a profession for college-bred women. An address delivered before the Association of collegiate alumnæ, on March 13, 1886, by Melvil Dewey and Statistics of libraries in the state of New York numbering over 300 volumes
Alfred Perceval Graves	Ireland	22 July 1846	27 December 1931	poet, songwriter, folklorist, president of the Irish Literary Society	Father O'Flynn, Songs of Old Ireland, Irish Songs and Ballads, Irish Folk-Songs, Songs of Erin
Ieronim Yasinsky	Russia	30 April 1850	31 December 1931	novelist, poet, literary critic, essayist, science fiction writer, children's writer	The Kiev Stories, Natashka, The Sleeping Beauty, Irinarkh Plutarkhov, The Old Friend, The Great Man, Under Satan's Cloak

== Entered the public domain in countries with life + 50 years ==
In most countries of Africa and Asia, as well as Belarus, Bolivia, Canada, New Zealand, Egypt and Uruguay; a work enters the public domain 50 years after the creator's death.

Names	Country	Birth	Death	Occupation	Notable work
Maila Talvio	Finland	17 October 1871	6 January 1951	novelist, short story writer, dramatist, non-fiction writer on the temperance movement	Aili, Kaksi rakkautta, Kansan seassa, Pimeän pirtin hävitys
René Guénon	France	15 November 1886	7 January 1951	writer on metaphysics, esotericist, Sufist	The Reign of Quantity and the Signs of the Times, Introduction to the Study of the Hindu doctrines, Man and His Becoming According to the Vedanta, The Symbolism of the Cross
Sinclair Lewis	United States	7 February 1885	10 January 1951	novelist, short-story writer, playwright.	Main Street, Babbitt, Arrowsmith, Elmer Gantry, Dodsworth, It Can't Happen Here
James Bridie	United Kingdom	3 January 1888	29 January 1951	playwright, screenwriter, physician.	A Sleeping Clergyman, Mary Read, Daphne Laureola, wrote the screenplays for the films The Paradine Case, Under Capricorn, and Stage Fright
Lloyd C. Douglas	United States	27 August 1877	13 February 1951	historical novelist, Lutheran and Congregationalist minister	The Robe, The Big Fisherman, Magnificent Obsession, Home for Christmas
Henri-René Lenormand	France	3 May 1882	16 February 1951	playwright, popularized Freudian theories of psychoanalysis	La Grande Mort, Le Réveil de l'instinct, Les Ratés, Confessions d'un auter dramatique
André Gide	France	22 November 1869	19 February 1951	Novelist, essayist, dramatist	The Immoralist, Strait Is the Gate, The Pastoral Symphony, The Counterfeiters, The Fruits of the Earth
Vsevolod Vishnevsky	Russia	21 December 1900	28 February 1951	playwright, screenwriter, journalist, war correspondent	An Optimistic Tragedy, We Are from Kronstadt, Battle at West, By the Walls of Leningrad, We, Russian People
János Zsupánek	Hungary	6 January 1861	11 March 1951	poet, hymn writer	Magyar dalok (Hungarian Songs), Vu iméni Ocsé, i Sziná, i Dühá, szvétoga Ámen (In the Name of the Father, and the Son, and the Holy Spirit, Amen), Mrtvecsne peszmi (Dirges), Szenje blázsene device Marie (The Fair of the Blessed Virgin Mary, in Novine)
Oscar Micheaux	United States	2 January 1884	25 March 1951	novelist, film director, independent film producer	The Conquest: The Story of a Negro Pioneer, The Forged Note, The Homesteader: A Novel, The Wind from Nowhere, Masquerade, a Historical Novel
Henrik Visnapuu	Estonia	2 January 1890	3 April 1951	playwright, Symbolist poet, school teacher, freelance journalist	Amores, Ad astra, Mare Balticum, Linnutee
Sadegh Hedayat	Iran	17 February 1903	9 April 1951	Modernist writer, novelist, short story writer, satirist, poet, translator	The Blind Owl, The Stray Dog, The Benefits of Vegetarianism, Three Drops of Blood
Henry de Vere Stacpoole	Ireland	9 April 1863	12 April 1951	romance novelist, memoirist, translator, conservation movement activist focusing on the protection of seabirds	The Blue Lagoon, The Garden of God, The Gates of Morning, The Beach of Dreams: A Story of the True World
Ludwig Wittgenstein	United Kingdom	26 April 1889	29 April 1951	philosopher, lexicographer	Tractatus Logico-Philosophicus, Some Remarks on Logical Form, Philosophical Investigations, Remarks on Frazer's Golden Bough
Alphonse de Châteaubriant	France	25 March 1877	2 May 1951	novelist, fascist and Nazist political writer	The Keynote, La Brière, ...Des saisons et des jours... Journal de l'auteur, 1911-1924, Fragments d'une confession – La sainteté
Paula von Preradović	Austria	12 October 1887	25 May 1951	poet, lyricist, diarist	Land der Berge, Land am Strome (Land of the Peaks, Land by the Stream), Wiener Chronik, Die Versuchung des Columba, Pave und Pero
Hermann Broch	Austria	1 November 1886	30 May 1951	Modernist writer, novelist, short story writer, non-fiction writer on mass psychology	The Sleepwalkers, The Death of Virgil, The Guiltless, The Spell
Håkon Evjenth	Norway	26 December 1894	10 June 1951	short story writer, children's writer, jurist, ethnographer with research focused on the Sami culture	Folk under fot, 3 på to og 2 på fire, På to og fire i Suonjo, Over kjølen i kano, En fiskergutt i Sameland
W. C. Sellar	United Kingdom	27 December 1898	11 June 1951	humourist, history teacher, schoolmaster	1066 and All That, And Now All This, Horse Nonsense, Garden Rubbish and other Country Bumps, contributor to the humour magazine Punch
William Randolph Hearst	United States	29 April 1863	14 August 1951	newspaper publisher, politician, political propagandist	eponymous founder of the media conglomerate Hearst Communications, co-founder of the print syndication company King Features Syndicate, founder and owner of the animation studio International Film Service which produced animated adaptations of the comic strips Krazy Kat, The Katzenjammer Kids, And Her Name Was Maud, Happy Hooligan, Jerry on the Job, Bringing Up Father, Abie the Agent, and Judge Rummy. Published propaganda in favor of Nazi Germany during the interwar period, and published newspaper columns without rebuttal which were written by Nazi leaders such as Hermann Göring and Alfred Rosenberg.
Richard Malden	United Kingdom	19 October 1879	August 1951	Ghost story writer, classical scholar, biblical scholar, President of the Somerset Archaeological Society, magazine editor, Anglican clergyman	Nine Ghosts, The Church of Headingley in Four Centuries, The Story of Wells Cathedral, The Apocrypha, The Growth of a Cathedral Church, Abbeys, their Rise and Fall, The Hangings In The Quire Of Wells Cathedral
Abraham Cahan	United States	7 July 1860	31 August 1951	Socialist politician, newspaper editor, novelist	The Imported Bridegroom, and Other Stories of the New York Ghetto, Yekl: A Tale of the New York Ghetto, The Rise of David Levinsky
Antoine Bibesco	Romania	19 July 1878	2 September 1951	dramatist, translator, diplomat, lawyer	Letters of Marcel Proust to Antoine Bibesco, Ladies All
F. G. Loring	United Kingdom	11 March 1869	7 September 1951	Vampire literature writer, technical journalist, naval correspondent	The Tomb of Sarah
Petre P. Negulescu	Romania	18 October 1870	28 September 1951	philosopher, radical conservative politician, university professor	wrote non-fiction tracts against the concepts of biological determinism and scientific racism, he also wrote Critica apriorismului și a empirismului (A Critique of Apriorism and Empiricism), Psihologia stilului (The Psychology of Style), Impersonalitatea și morala în artă (Impersonality and Morality in Art), Filosofia în viața practică (Philosophy in Practical Life), Rolul ideilor în progresul social (The Role of Ideas in Social Progress)
I. C. Vissarion	Romania	2 February 1879	5 November 1951	folklorist, fairy tale writer, science fiction and science fantasy writer, poet, anti-establishment political activist, inventor, esotericist, amateur researcher of environmental science, wave power, and renewable energy, promoter of pseudoscience.	Plăvanii (The Hoary Ones), Cartea omului neînțeles (The Book of a Misunderstood Man),Agerul Pământului (Earth's Agility), Energie mecanică în lumea în care ne găsim (Mechanic Energy for This World We Now Inhabit), Ghiță Cătănuță (Little Soldier Ghiță), Ochi negri(Black Eyes)
Timrava	Slovakia	2 October 1867	27 November 1951	novelist, short story writer, playwright, satirist, kindergarten teacher, caretaker of collections at the Slovak National Museum	That Alluring Land : Slovak Stories, co-published the journal Ratolest (Sprig)
Pedro Salinas	Spain	27 November 1891	4 December 1951	poet, university teacher, literary critic, translator	Reality and the Poet in Spanish Poetry, Presagios (Omens), Seguro azar (Certain chance), Underwood girls
Algernon Blackwood	United Kingdom	14 March 1869	10 December 1951	ghost story writer, novelist, short story writer, journalist, occultist	The Willows, The Wendigo, Incredible Adventures, The Doll and One Other

== Entering the public domain in the United States ==
In the United States, the copyright status of works extends for the life of the author or artists, plus 70 years. If the work is owned by a corporation, then the copyright extends 95 years.

Due to the passing of the Copyright Term Extension Act (Sonny Bono Copyright Term Extension Act) in 1998, no new works would enter the public domain in this jurisdiction until 2019.

== See also ==
- 1901 in literature, 1931 in literature and 1951 in literature for deaths of writers
- Public Domain Day
- Creative Commons
