= Buried Alive (short story) =

1930 short story by Sadegh Hedayat

- Short story by Sadegh Hedayat
- Original title: زنده‌به‌گور
- Country: Iran
- Language: Persian
- Genre: Short story

Publication
- Publication date: 1930

Buried Alive (Persian: Zende be gur, زنده‌به‌گور) is a 1930 short story by Iranian writer Sadegh Hedayat, written in Paris. It was translated into English by Brian Spooner in 1979. The story is known by the subtitle "from the jottings of a mad man".

== Plot summary ==
Buried Alive is told in the first person by a young writer who is sick in bed in Paris. He talks about his weakness, his thoughts of ending his life, and his failed attempts to poison himself while trying to make his death look natural. He moves between brief moments of hope and despair, recalling parts of his past and the things around him. The story ends with a report that he has died.

== Background ==
In The British Journal of Psychiatry, psychiatrist Cyrus Abbasian suggests that Hedayat attempted suicide by jumping into the Seine prior to writing Buried Alive.

== Themes ==
Michael Craig Hillmann notes in Iranica that "Buried Alive" shows a tension between the narrator’s wish for death and his act of writing. The first‑person narration states that the young, educated protagonist is marked by despair, a pattern also found in Hedayat's later story Three Drops of Blood.

== Publication ==
Buried Alive was written in Paris in 1930. It has been translated into English by Brian Spooner in 1979, and into French by Derayeh Derakhshesh in 1986. A second English translation was produced by Carter Bryant in 2005, and the story has also appeared in Armenian (Khachik Khacher, 2005) and in a Korean translation by Gyoseob Shin, published in a two‑volume collection of Hedayat’s short stories.

== Analysis ==
Abbasian writes that Buried Alive shows the thoughts and actions leading toward suicide, and notes that the story presents these aspects in detail.

A thesis by Maryam Najafibabanazar at the Middle East Technical University reports that Buried Alive, like Hedayat's stories Three Drops of Blood and The Blind Owl, uses a monotone narrative style and interior monologue to convey the narrator’s isolation.

Sima Gharibey, writing in the International Journal of Multicultural and Multireligious Understanding, describes Buried Alive as one of Hedayat's "psycho‑fiction" stories, placing it alongside The Blind Owl, Three Drops of Blood, and Davud the Hunchback.

In research by Mehrdad Bidgoli released in the University of Turin’s journal Kervan, Hedayat’s Buried Alive is discussed together with The Blind Owl and Three Drops of Blood as part of a group of works noting a darker use of surrealism.

== Critical reception ==
French criticism has compared Hedayat’s work with that of Franz Kafka. In a study published in Tehran Magazine, Shafigheh Keïvan observes that although some biographical similarities exist between the two writers, their literary styles differ, and any link between them is described as limited rather than direct.

Ehsan Yarshater, writing in Iranica, describes the short story as showing "the mood of a society in transition". Other critics note its focus on inner life, Hedayat's use of interior monologue, and his concise style. Some also mention links with Nikolai Gogol and a minor connection with Kafka.

Jason Bahbak Mohaghegh notes that "Buried Alive" states a form of mental collapse and a break between the narrator and the outside world. He mentions that the story reflects Hedayat’s interest in extreme states of mind and in the point where inner experience and reality no longer stay separate.

In a 2020 article on Hedayat's fiction, the story is described as written at a difficult time for the narrator and as indicating his uneasy position in his environment.

== Bibliography ==
- Hedayat, Sadegh. "Buried Alive." Translated by Brian Spooner. In Sadeq Hedayat: An Anthology, Westview Press, Boulder, CO, 1979, ISBN 9780891583875.
