= Stray dog (disambiguation) =

A stray dog is a lost or abandoned free-ranging dog.

Stray Dog, The Stray Dog or Stray Dogs may also refer to:

== Books ==
- The Stray Dog (short story collection), a 1942 collection by Iranian author Sadegh Hedayat
  - "The Stray Dog" (short story), a 1942 story by Sadegh Hedayat
- The Stray Dog (Simont book), a 2001 children's picture book by Marc Simont
- Stray Dog, a 1999 work by manga artist Hiromu Arakawa
- Stray Dogs, a 1997 novel by John Ridley
- Stray Dogs (comic), a 2020 comic by Tony Fleecs

== Film and TV ==
- Stray Dog (film), a 1949 film by Akira Kurosawa
- Stray Dogs (1989 film), a Soviet film directed by Dmitry Svetozarov
- StrayDog: Kerberos Panzer Cops, a 1991 film directed by Mamoru Oshii
- Stray Dogs (2004 film), an Iranian film by Marzieh Meshkini
- Stray Dogs (2013 film), a Taiwanese film by Tsai Ming-liang
- Stray Dogs (2014 film), a South Korean film by Ha Won-jun
- "The Stray Dog (Fullmetal Alchemist)", the 43rd episode of the Fullmetal Alchemist television series

== Music ==
- Stray Dog (band), a heavy blues-based hard rock band of the early seventies
- Stray Dog, a pseudonym of Dutch deejay Tiësto
- Stray Dog, the band Stray Dog (band)'s 1973 album
- Stray Dog (Hal Crook album), 2001
- Stray Dog (Justin Moore album), 2023
- Stray Dogs (album), a 2003 album by the Norwegian singer/songwriter Thomas Dybdahl
- Stray Dogs (2026), a 2026 album by the English rock band Nothing but Thieves
- "Stray Dog", a song, featuring Iggy Pop, on the 2015 album Music Complete, by English rock band New Order

== Other uses ==
- Stray Dog Café, a café in St. Petersburg, Russia
- Stray Dog a limited edition golden ale beer produced Moorhouse's Brewery inspired by the New Order song of the same name.

== See also ==
- War of the Stray Dog, an October 1925 brief conflict at Petrich between Greece and Bulgaria
- Wild dog (disambiguation)
