= Wild dogs =

Wild dogs may refer to:

== Animals ==
- Feral dogs, domestic dogs living as wild animals
- Dingo, or Australian wild dog, a free-ranging dog found in Australia
- Dingo–dog hybrids in Australia
- African wild dog, or African hunting dog, wild canine of Africa
- Asiatic wild dog, or dhole, wild canine of Asia

== Entertainment ==
- Wild Dogs, an American heavy metal band from Portland, Oregon
- Wild Dogs (film), a 1985 Cuban drama film
- A song from Teaser, the debut solo album by guitarist Tommy Bolin
- A song from Funeral, the thirteenth studio album by rapper Lil Wayne

== See also ==
- Wild dog (disambiguation)
