= Brian Spooner =

Brian Spooner may refer to:

- Brian Spooner (anthropologist)
- Brian Spooner (mycologist)
