= Wael Hallaq =

Scholar of Islam

Wael B. Hallaq
- وائل حلّاق
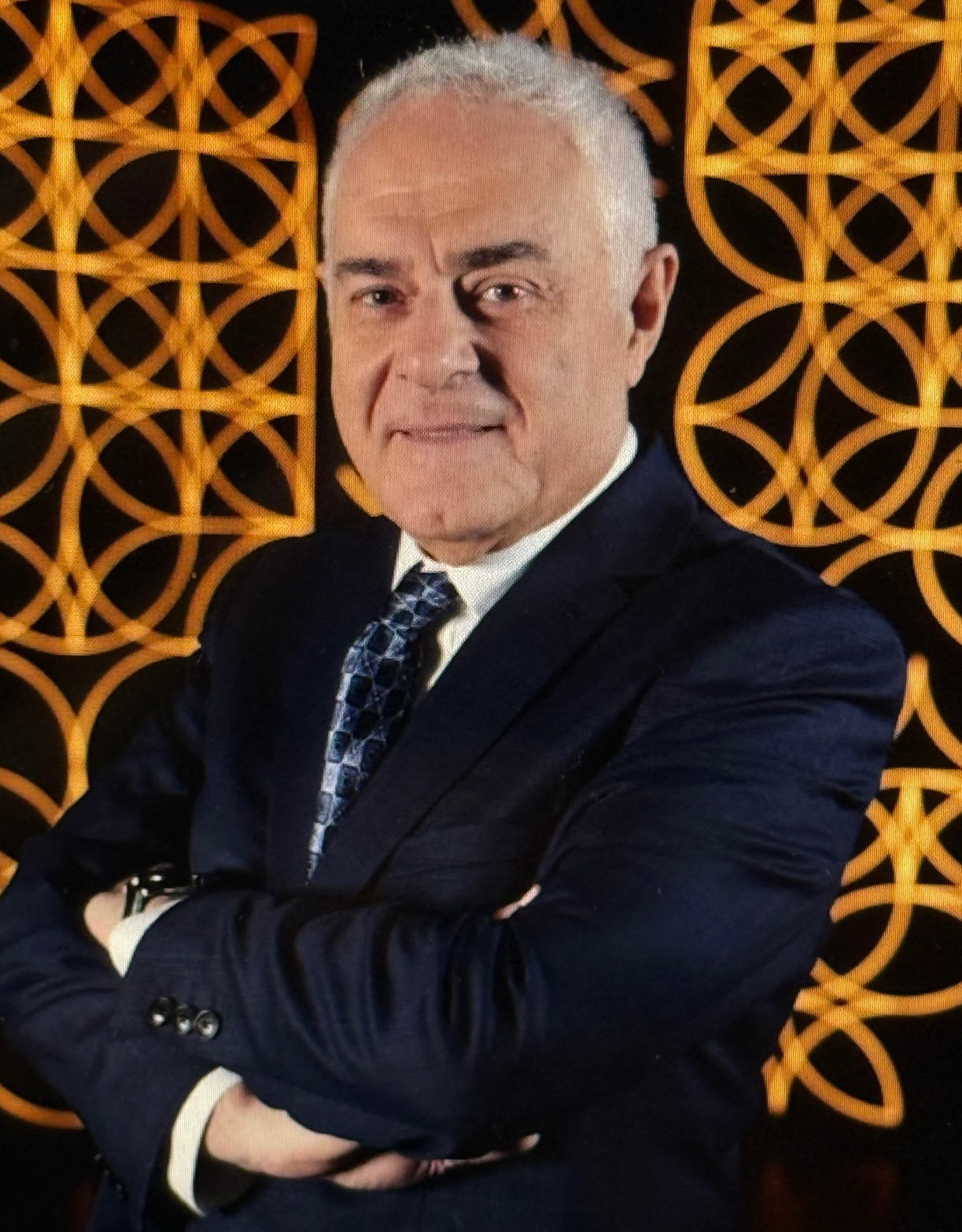
- Born: 1955 (age 70–71); Nazareth
- Citizenship: United States
- Occupations: Professor of Islamic law and Islamic intellectual history
- Employer: Columbia University
- Notable work: The Impossible State; Sharī'a: Theory, Practice, Transformations; Restating Orientalism: A Critique of Modern Knowledge
- Website: waelhallaq.com

Wael B. Hallaq (Arabic: وائل حلّاق) is a Palestinian-American scholar of Islamic studies and the Avalon Foundation Professor in the Humanities at Columbia University, where he has been teaching ethics, law, and political thought since 2009. He is considered a leading scholar in the field of Islamic legal studies, and has been described as one of the world's leading authorities on Islamic law.

Hallaq has published more than a dozen books and 80 articles on topics including law, legal theory, philosophy, political theory, and logic. Much of his writings during the last decade and a half have focused on an ethical critique of the modern project. In 2009, John Esposito and his review panel included Hallaq in a list of the 500 most influential Muslims in the world for his research and publications on Islamic law, although Hallaq hails from a Christian background.

Hallaq gained prominence for his doctoral work challenging the notion of the so-called "the closing of the gate of ijtihad," a narrative that was for long accepted in the field as paradigmatic. The narrative posited that Muslim jurists of the post formative period (after ca. 900 AD) abandoned creative legal reasoning, this supposedly leading to a generalized stagnation of the law. Hallaq argued that this narrative was a product of European colonial discourse that attempted to justify the colonization of Muslim lands and the destruction of indigenous Muslim legal and educational institutions.

== Early life and career ==
Wael Hallaq was born to a Palestinian Christian family in Nazareth in 1955. He graduated with a bachelor's degree in Political Science and History from the University of Haifa, then he earned a Master's degree and a Ph.D. from the University of Washington.

Hallaq joined McGill University as an assistant professor of Islamic law in 1985, after completing his Ph.D. studies in 1983 in the departments of History, Political Science, Near Eastern Studies, and the Law School. He became a full professor in 1994, and was awarded the distinguished James McGill Professorship in Islamic law in 2005.

== Research and publications ==
Hallaq's teaching and research deal with the problematic epistemic ruptures generated by the onset of modernity and the socio-politico- historical forces subsumed by it; with the intellectual history of Orientalism and the repercussions of Orientalist paradigms in later scholarship and in Islamic legal studies as a whole; and with the synchronic and diachronic development of Islamic traditions of logic, legal theory, and substantive law and the interdependent systems within these traditions. Hallaq's writings have explored the structural dynamics of legal change in pre-modern law, and have examined the centrality of moral theory to understanding the history of Islamic law and modern political movements. For the past decade and a half, his work has increasingly focused on the critique of the modern project, including the paradigmatic structures of knowledge that drive it. His recent research has dealt with the constitutional practices of Islamic governance between the ninth and eighteenth centuries, with a view, among other things, to constructing a heuristic for a critique of modern constitutional arrangements.

Hallaq's major works include Radical Separation of Powers: A History of Islamic Constitutionalism (2026); Restating Orientalism: A Critique of Modern Knowledge (2018); Reforming Modernity: Ethics and the New Human in the Philosophy of Abdurrahman Taha (2019); Authority, Continuity, and Change in Islamic Law (2001); The Origins and Evolution of Islamic Law (2005); Shari`a: Theory, Practice, Transformations (2009); An Introduction to Islamic Law (2009), and A History of Islamic Legal Theories (1997).

Professor Hallaq's work is widely debated and translated, with numerous books, dissertations, and articles devoted to the study and analysis of his writings. His life and work have been featured in many symposia, talk shows, and documentaries by major media outlets. In 2015, his Impossible State (2013) won Columbia's distinguished Book Award for the two years prior, and since it appeared in Arabic in 2014, it has commanded much attention in academic circles and mass media in the Muslim world. In 2007, he won the Islamic Republic of Iran's best book prize for his Origins and Evolution, and in 2020, a Nautilus Book Award for Reforming Modernity. In 2021, he was awarded the TÜBA Prize, given by the Turkish Academy of Science in recognition of innovative and path-breaking scholarship in the Humanities and Social Sciences. Later in the same year, he was elected an Honorary Member of this Academy. In 2024, he won the prestigious King Faisal International Prize for his lifetime contributions to the study of Islamic law and modern legislation.

Dozens of his major articles and all his books (with the exception of Radical Separation of Powers) have now been rendered into Arabic and Turkish, and many are translated into several other languages including Chinese, Indonesian, Japanese, Persian, Urdu, Hindi, Hebrew, Italian, German, French, and most recently Albanian, Russian, and Bengali.

In 2018, Hallaq published Restating Orientalism: A Critique of Modern Knowledge published by Columbia University Press. In this book, Hallaq argues that Said’s canonical work, however timely when it was published, is a stunted critique of Orientalism, because Said the secular liberal could not locate the problem beyond politics and representation. Hallaq insists that Orientalism’s epistemic foundations, shared by all fields of academic knowledge, represent and in fact capture Enlightenment thought—which is characterized by domination, extractionism, and unprecedented forms of racism and structural genocidal violence.

Aziz Rana of Cornell Law School, author of The Two Faces of American Freedom, describes the text as "a brilliant interrogation of Said's famous concept, highlighting the extent which the issue of Orientalism is not simply one of problematic European authors, but instead goes to the heart of how the modern project itself constitutes subjects, knowledge, and power... It is essential reading and will be debated by scholars for years to come."

Walter Mignolo, an Argentine semiotician (École des Hautes Études) and professor at Duke University, said of Restating Orientalism that:

"It is becoming increasingly evident among decolonial thinkers that colonial management (with or without colonies, with or without settlers) is a question of controlling and managing knowledge, and that power differential is implicit in agents, institutions, and languages of epistemic governance. Wael B. Hallaq brilliantly drives us, through a meticulous reading of Edward Said’s Orientalism, to the awareness that domination is grounded on epistemic sovereignty and that liberation is unthinkable without epistemic freedom."

Professor of Near Eastern Studies at Cornell, David S. Powers, noted in 2010:

"During the past decade, Hallaq has turned from the medium of the scholarly article to that of the scholarly monograph. Synthesizing his findings and placing them within a larger conceptual framework, he has written three important monographs published by Cambridge University Press: A History of Islamic Legal Theories (1997); Authority, Continuity, and Change in Islamic Law (2001), and The Origins and Evolution of Islamic Law (2004), a stunning accomplishment for a man of his age. Suffice it to say that when Wael B. Hallaq speaks, historians of Islamic law listen."

About Hallaq’s most recent book, Radical Separation of Powers, Professor Muhammad Qasim Zaman of Princeton wrote:

“The breadth of Hallaq’s analysis of Islamic constitutionalism and the philosophical depth that he brings to it open new vistas on political thought in pre-modern Islam. His brilliant readings of key texts in Islamic political theory serve to peel off thick layers of misrepresentation, bringing those texts alive and allowing us to view them with fresh eyes. Along the way, he offers a trenchant critique of both Orientalism and liberalism. This book will have a transformative impact on the study of Islamic political thought, but its arguments speak to a much wider audience, which, too, will be in Hallaq’s debt.”

== Courses taught ==
Over the last four decades, Hallaq has taught a wide range of courses, both graduate and undergraduate, the latter in particular since he joined Columbia. The undergraduate course offerings include modules on key classical texts in translation; Central Questions in Islamic Law; Jihad, Liberalism and Violence; Sufism, Sharia and Politics; and History of Islamic law across the centuries. On the graduate level, he taught seminars – all conducted on the basis of primary Arabic sources – in Quranic exegesis; Hadith; Usul al-Fiqh; Fiqh; Adab al-Mufti; Adab al-Qadi; Logic (Mantiq); Political texts and mirrors for the prince; Sufism; and Nahda writings and modern moral philosophy.

== Current research ==
Hallaq’s current research interests focus on two distinct projects, one aiming at a critique of the Enlightenment and modern conception of freedom while the other is a critique of modern philology, offering a kind of textual-ethical practice that he calls “dialectical philology.”

== Publications ==
Authored Volumes

- Radical Separation of Powers: A History of Islamic Constitutionalism (London: Oneworld Academic, 2026).
- Fi al-Sharia wal-Dawla wa-Naqd al-Hadatha: Ta'ammulat wa-Muthaqafat (Beirut, 2025).
- Reforming Modernity: Ethics and the New Human in the Philosophy of Abdurrahman Taha (New York: Columbia University Press, 2019); Winner of the Silver Nautulus Award, 2020; Arabic translation (Beirut, 2019); Turkish translation (Istanbul, 2020).
- Al-Qur’an wal-Shari`a: Nahw Dusturiyya Islamiyya Jadida (Beirut: al-Shabaka al-`Arabiyya, 2019).
- Restating Orientalism: A Critique of Modern Knowledge (New York: Columbia University Press, 2018); Arabic translation (Beirut, 2018); Turkish translation (Istanbul, 2020); German Translation (Berlin, 2022).
- The Impossible State: Islam, Politics and Modernity’s Moral Predicament (New York: Columbia University Press, 2013); Winner of the Distinguished Book Award of Columbia University Press and the Office of the Provost; Arabic translation (Beirut, 2014; second printing in the same year); Indonesian translation (Yogyakarta, 2015); Urdu Translation (Lahore, 2018); Turkish Translation (Istanbul, 2019); Japanese and Chinese translations in progress.
- An Introduction to Islamic Law (Cambridge, UK; New York: Cambridge University Press, 2009).
- Shari'a: Theory, Practice, Transformations (Cambridge, UK; New York: Cambridge University Press, 2009).
- The Origins and Evolution of Islamic Law (Cambridge, UK; New York: Cambridge University Press, 2005).
- Was the Gate of Ijtihad Closed? The Early Essays on the History of Islamic Legal Theories by Wael B. Hallaq / ed. and trans. Atsushi Okuda (Tokyo: Keio University Press, 2003; in Japanese, containing translations of a number of the below articles).
- Authority, Continuity, and Change in Islamic law (Cambridge, U.K.; New York: Cambridge University Press, 2001).
- A History of Islamic Legal Theories: An Introduction to Sunni Usul al-Fiqh (Cambridge: Cambridge University Press, 1997); Paperback edition, 1999; Reprinted, 2002; Translated into Indonesian (Jakarta: PT RajaGrafindo Persada, 2000); Arabic translation (Beirut, 2007); Japanese translation (Tokyo, 2010); Persian translation (Tehran, 2008); Russian translation (Moscow 2020).
- Law and Legal Theory in Classical and Medieval Islam (Aldershot: Variorum, 1995). viii + 329 pages. Reprinted 2001, 2003. Arabic translation (Riyadh, 2023).
- Ibn Taymiyya Against the Greek Logicians translated with an introduction and notes by Wael B. Hallaq (New York: Oxford University Press, 1993; a translation of Jahd al-qarīḥah fī tajrīd al-Naṣīḥah, an abridgment by al-Suyūṭī of Ibn Taymīyah's work Naṣīḥat ahl al-bayān fī al-radd ʻalá manṭiq al-Yūnān).

Edited Anthologies

- The formation of Islamic law (Aldershot, UK; Burlington, VT: Ashgate/Variorum, 2004).
- Islamic studies presented to Charles J. Adams / edited by Wael B. Hallaq and Donald P. Little. (Leiden; New York: Brill, 1991).
- Tradition, Modernity, and Postmodernity in Arabic Literature : Essays in Honor of Professor Issa J. Boullata, coeditor Kamal Abdel-Malek (Leiden: E.J. Brill, 2000).

Selected Articles

- "God Cannot be Harmed’: On Huquq Allah/Huquq al-`Ibad Continuum,” Routledge Handbook of Islamic Law, ed. Khalid Abou El Fadl, et al (London: Routledge, 2019).
- "Usul al-Fiqh and Shafi`i’s Risala,” Journal of Arabic and Islamic Studies, 19 (2019), 129-183.
- "Seventeen Theses on History,” in Jason Mohaghegh et al., eds., Manifestos of World Thought (Lanham, MD: Rowman and Littlefield, 2018).
- "Quranic Magna Carta: On the Origins of the Rule of Law in Islam,” in R. Griffith-Jones and Mark Hill, eds., Magna Carta, Religion and the Rule of Law (Cambridge: Cambridge University Press, 2014): 157-76.
- "On Orientalism, Self-Consciousness and History,” Islamic Law and Society, 18, 3-4 (2011): 387-439.
- "Qur'anic Constitutionalism and Moral Governmentality: Further Notes on the Founding Principles of Islamic Society and Polity," Comparative Islamic Studies, 8, 1-2 (2012): 1-51.
- "Groundwork of the Moral Law: A New Look at the Qur'ān and the Genesis of Sharī'a," Islamic Law and Society, vol.16 (2009): 239-79.
- "Islamic Law: History and Transformation," The New Cambridge History of Islam, vol. 4, ed. R. Irwin (Cambridge: Cambridge University Press, 2010): 142-83.
- "What is Sharia?" Yearbook of Islamic and Middle Eastern Law, 2005–2006, vol. 12 (Leiden: Brill Academic Publishers, 2007): 151-80.
- "Juristic Authority vs. State Power: The Legal Crises of Modern Islam," Journal of Law and Religion, 19, 2 (2003–04), 101-116.
- "Can the Shari'a be Restored?" in Yvonne Y. Haddad and Barbara F. Stowasser, eds., Islamic Law and the Challenges of Modernity (Walnut Creek: Altamira Press, 2004), 21-53.
- "'Muslim Rage' and Islamic Law," Hastings Law Journal, 54 (August, 2003), 1-17.
- "The Quest for Origins or Doctrine? Islamic Legal Studies as Colonialist Discourse," UCLA Journal of Islamic and Near Eastern Law, 2, 1 (2002–03), 1-31.
- "A Prelude to Ottoman Reform: Ibn 'Abidîn on Custom and Legal Change," Histories of the Modern Middle East: New Directions, eds. I. Gershoni et al. (Boulder & London: Lynne Rienner, 2002), 37-61.
- "Takhrij and the Construction of Juristic Authority," Studies in Islamic Legal Theory, ed. Bernard G. Weiss (Leiden: Brill, 2002), 317-35.
- "On Dating Mâlik's Muwatta'," UCLA Journal of Islamic and Near Eastern Law, 1, 1 (2001–02), 47-65.
- "From Geographical to Personal Schools?: A Reevaluation," Islamic Law and Society, 8,1 (2001), 1-26.
- "The Author-Jurist and Legal Change in Traditional Islamic Law," RIMO (Maastricht), 18 (2000), 31-75.
- "The Authenticity of Prophetic Hâdith: A Pseudo-Problem," Studia Islamica 89 (1999), 75-90.
- "Qadis Communicating: Legal Change and the Law of Documentary Evidence," al-Qantara, XX (1999), 437-66.
- "The Qadi's Diwan (Sijill) before the Ottomans," Bulletin of the School of Oriental and African Studies, 61, 3 (1998), 415-36.
- "Introduction: Issues and Problems," (as Guest Editor) Islamic Law and Society, 3, 2 (1996), 127-36.
- "Ifta' and Ijtihad in Sunni Legal Theory: A Developmental Account," in Kh. Masud, Brink Messick, and David Powers, eds., Islamic Legal Interpretation: Muftîs and their Fatwas (Cambridge: Harvard University Press, 1996), 33-43.
- "Model Shurut Works and the Dialectic of Doctrine and Practice," Islamic Law and Society, 2, 2 (1995), 109-34.
- "Murder in Cordoba: Ijtihad, Ifta' and the Evolution of Substantive Law in Medieval Islam" Acta Orientalia (Oslo), 55 (1994), 55-83.
- "From Fatwas to Furu': Growth and Change in Islamic Substantive Law" Islamic Law and Society, 1 (February 1994), 17-56.
- Co-author. Symposium on Religious Law: Roman Catholic, Islamic, and Jewish Treatment of Familial Issues, Loyola of Los Angeles International and Comparative Law Journal, 1, 16 (1993), 41f, 53f, 79f.
- "Was al-Shafi'i the Master Architect of Islamic Jurisprudence?," International Journal of Middle East Studies, 4 (November 1993), 587-605.
- "Usul al-Fiqh: Beyond Tradition," Journal of Islamic Studies, 3, 2 (1992), 172-202.
- "Ibn Taymiyya on the Existence of God," Acta Orientalia (Copenhagen), 52 (1991), 49-69. (Translated into Turkish by Bilal Kuspinar, "Ibn Teymiyye'ye Göre Allah'in Varligi," Sosyal Bilimler Dergisi 3 (April, 1993), 135-153).
- "The Primacy of the Qur'an in Shatibi's Legal Theory," in Wael B. Hallaq and D. Little, eds., Islamic Studies Presented to Charles J. Adams (Leiden: E.J. Brill, 1991), 65-86.
- "On Inductive Corroboration, Probability and Certainty in Sunni Legal Thought," in Nicholas L. Heer, ed., Islamic Law and Jurisprudence: Studies in Honor of Farhat J. Ziadeh (Seattle: University of Washington Press, 1990), 3-31.
- "Logic, Formal Arguments and Formalization of Arguments in Sunni Jurisprudence," Arabica, 37, 3 (1990), 315-358.
- "The Use and Abuse of Evidence: The Question of Provincial and Roman Influences on Early Islamic Law," Journal of the American Oriental Society, 110, 1 (1990), 79-91.
- "Non-Analogical Arguments in Sunni Juridical Qiyas," Arabica, 36, 3 (1989), 286-306.
- "Notes on the Term Qarina in Islamic Legal Discourse," Journal of the American Oriental Society, 108, 3 (1988), 475-80.
- "A Tenth-Eleventh Century Treatise on Juridical Dialectic," Muslim World, 77, 2-3 (1987), 198-227.
- "The Development of Logical Structure in Islamic Legal Theory," Der Islam, 64, 1 (1987),42-67. Reprinted in Islamic Law and Legal Theory, ed. Ian Edge (The International Library of Essays in Law and Legal Theory, series editor Tom D. Campbell) (Hampshire: Dartmouth Publishing Co., 1993).
- "On the Origins of the Controversy about the Existence of Mujtahids and the Gate of Ijtihad," Studia Islamica, 63 (1986),129-41. Persian translation by A. Kazemi-Moussavi, "Rishaha-yi Bahth dar Bara-yi Vujud-i Mujtahid va Bab-i Ijtihad," Tahqiqat-i Islami, 5, 1-2 (1369/1990-1),123-34. Translated into Indonesian by Nurul Agustini in Hikmat, 7 (1992), 43-54.
- "On the Authoritativeness of Sunni Consensus," The International Journal of Middle East Studies, 18, 4 (1986),427-54.
- "The Logic of Legal Reasoning in Religious and Non-Religious Cultures: The Case of Islamic Law and Common Law," The Cleveland State Law Review, 34, 1 (1985-6), 79-96. Reprinted in Comparative Legal Cultures, ed. Csaba Varga (The International Library of Essays in Law and Legal Theory, series editor T. D. Campbell) (Hampshire: Dartmouth Publishing Co., 1992), 401-418.
- "Considerations on the Function and Character of Sunni Legal Theory," Journal of the American Oriental Society, 104, 4 (1984), 679-89.
- "Caliphs, Jurists and the Saljuqs in the Political Thought of Juwayni," Muslim World, 74, 1 (1984), 26-41.
- "Was the Gate of Ijtihad Closed?" International Journal of Middle East Studies, 16, 1 (1984), 3-41. Reprinted in Islamic Law and Legal Theory, ed. Ian Edge (The International Library of Essays in Law and Legal Theory, series editor Tom D. Campbell (Hampshire: Dartmouth Publishing Co., 1993); Translated into Hebrew in Al-Jama'a, the Chaim Herzog Center for Middle East Studies, 8 (2001),118-68, with an introduction by Nimrod Hurvitz.

== See also ==
- Palestinian law
