= Anvar Khamei =

Iranian academic and politician (1917–2018)

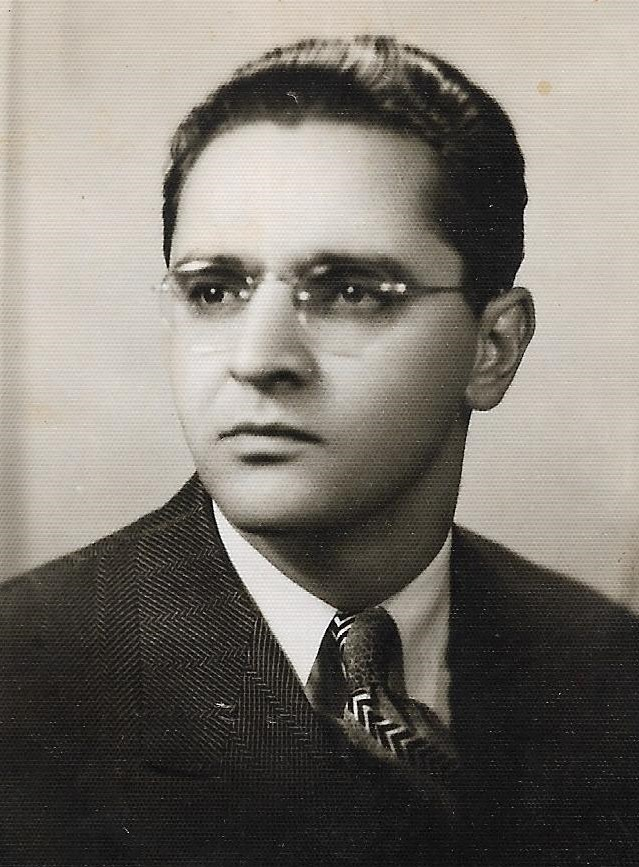
- Khamei in 1960s
- Born: 20 March 1917; Tehran, Sublime State of Iran
- Died: 20 November 2018 (aged 101); Karaj, Iran
- Years active: 1931–2018
- Political party: Tudeh Party

Anvar Khāmahʼī (Persian: انور خامه‌ای; 20 March 1917 – 20 November 2018) was an Iranian sociologist, economist, journalist, and politician, who wrote many books in his specialty fields, including his analytical and critical book Revisionism from Marx to Mao Tse-Tung. Khamei gained his B.Sc. in sociology and his Ph.D. in economics from the Heidelberg University and the University of Freiburg, respectively. In addition, he held a M.Sc. degree in journalism. He was a university professor at the University of Louvain (UCLouvain) in Belgium, and a UNESCO fellow. He was the youngest child of Yahya Kashani (Khamei), who was one of the pioneers of Iranian Modern Journalism and the editor of Ḥabl al-matin, Majles, Irān, and Etellaat newspapers. Khamei was an activist of the Tudeh Party of Iran in the 1940s, but he quit in January 1948, and concentrated on his journalistic and academic activities. He believed in social democracy, or in other words, the Third Way, for the most of his life. Khamei was a multilinguist, being proficient in German, French, and English languages, in addition to his mother tongue Persian language, with many publications in all those languages. He died on 20 November 2018 at the age of 101 from respiratory failure. He was a descendant of Fath-Ali Shah Qajar.

== See also ==
- From No. 37
