= From No. 37 =

- Directed by: Sam kalantari & Mohsen shahrnazdar
- Written by: Sam Kalantari & Mohsen Shahrnazdar
- Produced by: Shadmehr Rastin, Mohsen Shahrnazdar & Sam Kalantari
- Edited by: Sam Kalantari & Mohsen Shahrnazdar
- Music by: Iman Vaziri
- Release date: October 24, 2009
- Running time: 90 minutes
- Country: Iran
- Languages: Persian; French

From No. 37 (Persian: از خانه شماره ۳۷) is an Iranian documentary about Persian author Sadegh Hedayat. It was directed by Sam Kalantari and Mohsen Shahrnazdar. From No. 37 lasts 90 minutes and was filmed in France, Iran, Norway and the United Kingdom.

From No. 37 explores the private life and works of Hedayat. The film includes interviews with Iranian authors, intellectuals and academics including Homa Katouzian, Nasser Pakdaman, Anvar Khamei, Ehsan Naraghi, and some of Hedayat's relatives.

The film's dialogue is in Persian with English and French subtitles. It premiered at the Persian Artists Forum in Tehran and the British Academy in London. From No. 37 has aired on BBC Persian Television.
