= Maxime Feri Farzaneh =

French-Iranian writer and filmmaker (1929–2022)

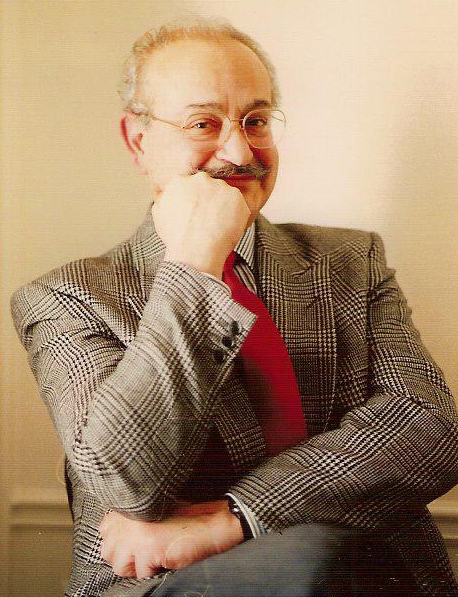
Maxime Feri Farzaneh

Maxime Feri Farzaneh (born Mostafa Farzaneh; 2 July 1929 – 19 July 2022) was a French-Iranian writer and filmmaker. He signed his books "M.F. Farzaneh" and his films "Feri Farzaneh".

== Biography ==
Farzaneh was born in Tehran, Iran on 2 July 1929. He started to study at the age of 6 in the only boy-and-girl school in Tehran. He went to Tamaddon High School. This particularly cosmopolitan school, nested in the embassies' district of Tehran, would lead him to befriend numerous Russian, Polish, Czech, and Romanian refugees as well as all kinds of Iranians, whether they were Shiites, Assyrians, Jews or Armenians.

The dean, Mr. Salek, had chosen his faculty members without following the recommendations of the Ministry of Education. For instance, the French teacher had come from France, through Algeria to Tehran amidst World War II. Always looking sharp, that gentleman would only speak French. So much so that for the most part, his students did not know he was actually Iranian! The maths teacher was a chemical engineer and the literature teacher, Javad Fazel, was a renowned serial novelist. He was actually the first one to encourage Farzaneh to start writing, publishing one of his poems in a weekly magazine.

When he was about to graduate from Alborz High School, his philosophy teacher S. Goharine, a renowned specialist of Mowlavi, introduced Farzaneh to Sadegh Hedayat. Hedayat encouraged him to read Kafka and Sartre – from which he had personally translated a few books – as well as James Joyce, Virginia Woolf, Albert Camus and John Dos Passos.

At the age of twenty, Farzaneh decided to write his first novel: Four Aches. In this book, he used the inner monologue in Persian literature.

After two years in his law studies, while studying French at the French Institute, he decided to leave Tehran and emigrate to Paris in 1950. He wanted to fulfill both his dream and his mother's. She had indeed religiously kept the souvenirs her father had brought back from his trip there at the Universal Exhibition, back in 1900.

Since his father insisted on it, Farzaneh pursued his law degree, while also enrolling in ethnology studies, as recommended by Hedayat. They met again in Paris. Hedayat committed suicide in April 1951.

Married with a child, he needed to shorten his studies. He went to Toulouse to get his Ph.D., benefiting from a special governmental program for foreign students. He then received a scholarship to attend the Institute of Higher Cinematographic Studies (IDHEC). He eventually decided to stay in France and started a career as a film director and producer.

He first published La Maison d’Exil in 1990, a dream novel with a desperate tone. Then, three years later, he published Rencontres avec Sadegh Hedayat (Jose Corti). There he painted a particularly living portrait of someone who until then was no more than the author of The Blind Owl. Farzaneh went on to translate a few important works from Hedayat: Madame Alavieh and L’Eau de Jouvence as well as Hedayat's critical study of Omar Khayam’s verses.

In 1996 he published Les Quatre Douleurs, the French version of his novel Four Aches. In the following years, he published other books in Persian, including an autobiography called L'Araignee Loquace (The Talkative Spider) and some short stories, including Les Dents (The Teeth), La Jeune fille et Azrael (The young Girl and Azrael), Le Facteur (The Mailman), and Le Destin (Destiny), where fantasy meets black humor and satire.

Farzaneh died in Cannes on 19 July 2022 aged 93. (Note: 28 Tir in Solar Hijri calendar is 19 July in Gregorian calendar)

== Literary works ==
=== Fiction ===
- Les Quatre douleurs, novel, including one chapter corrected by Sadegh Hedayat, 1949–1954. Banned in Iran up to this day. Published in France by Austral, 1996, then by L'insomniaque, 1998.
- L'Eclipse, theater play, 1955.
- Les Dents, a collection of short stories, Paris, 1986. Banned in Iran. The actual Les Dents was published in French in the Europe magazine, Paris, August–September 2014.
- Rencontres avec Sadegh Hedayat, 1988, with Frederic Farzaneh, Jose Corti, Paris, 1993.
- La Maison d’Exil, Phebus, Paris, 1990.
- L'impasse, retracing Morteza Keyvan's life, a brilliant intellectual shot under the Pahlavi regime, 1991.
- Faux et vrais, a collection of short stories, 1993. Banned in Iran. Baran, Stockholm.
- L'Araignee loquace, novel, 1996. Banned in Iran.
- Sadegh Hedayat dans la toile d'Araignee, a biography. Published both in Iran and in Germany, 2004.
- La langue rouge, Op-eds, Baran, Stockholm, 2008.
- L'Araignee loquace, translated into French with Frederic Farzaneh and Sara Saïdi B., foreword by Joel Gayraud, l'Harmattan, Paris, 2014.

=== Translations ===
==== Translations in French ====
- Les Chants d'Omar Khayam, Sadegh Hedayat, with Jean Malaplate, Jose Corti, Paris, 1993.
- L'Eau de jouvence, with Frederic Farzaneh, both short stories written in French by Sadegh Hedayat, corrected by Joel Gayraud, 1996.
- Madame Alavieh, with Joel Gayraud et Arthur Arrivant, 1977.

==== Translations in Persian ====
- Books and short stories by Stephan Zweig, J.-P. Sartre, S. Freud, N. Gogol, Somerset Maugham, Maupassant, Baudelaire, Verlaine and several books from the "Que sais-je" series.

== Filmmaking activities ==
=== As director ===
- The Persian Miniatures, 1958, Venice Festival Diploma, 1959.
- Cyrus the Great, 1961, first Iranian film presented at the Cannes film festival.
- The Woman and the Animal, 1962, laureate at the Locarno film festival.
- Parisian,… Parisians, 1963, laureate of the Quality.
- Khark Island, 1966, his only movie made in Iran.

=== As producer ===
- CEO of Fargo S.A. (short films), from 1961 to 1969.
- CEO of Mithra Films S.A. (feature films), from 1978 to 1983.

== Other activities ==
- Founder of Iran's first ever movie school in 1966.
- Co-founder of Iran's National TV broadcast, 1966–67.
- Professor at the University of Fine Arts in Tehran, 1968.
- Director and then CEO of Bank Saderat Iran (Paris) for all French-speaking territories, 1969–1980.
- CEO of several REITS, 1969–1980.

== See also ==
- Intellectual movements in Iran
- Persian literature
