= Wild dog (disambiguation) =

Wild dog is a term broadly applied to canines that are either not domesticated or not owned.

Wild dog may also refer to:

== Animals ==
- Feral dogs, domestic dogs living as wild animals
- Dingo, or Australian wild dog, a free-ranging dog found in Australia
- Dingo–dog hybrids in Australia
- African wild dog, or African hunting dog, wild canine of Africa
- Asiatic wild dog, or dhole, wild canine of Asia

== Entertainment ==
- Wild Dog (album), a 2012 album by Susanna, also known as Susanna and the Magical Orchestra
- Wild Dog (character), a fictional vigilante appearing in DC comics
- Wild Dog (film), an Indian Telugu-language film
- Wild Dog (Time Crisis), a villain in the Time Crisis series of video games

== See also ==
- Wild dogs (disambiguation)
