= Jason Bahbak Mohaghegh =

Iranian american philosopher

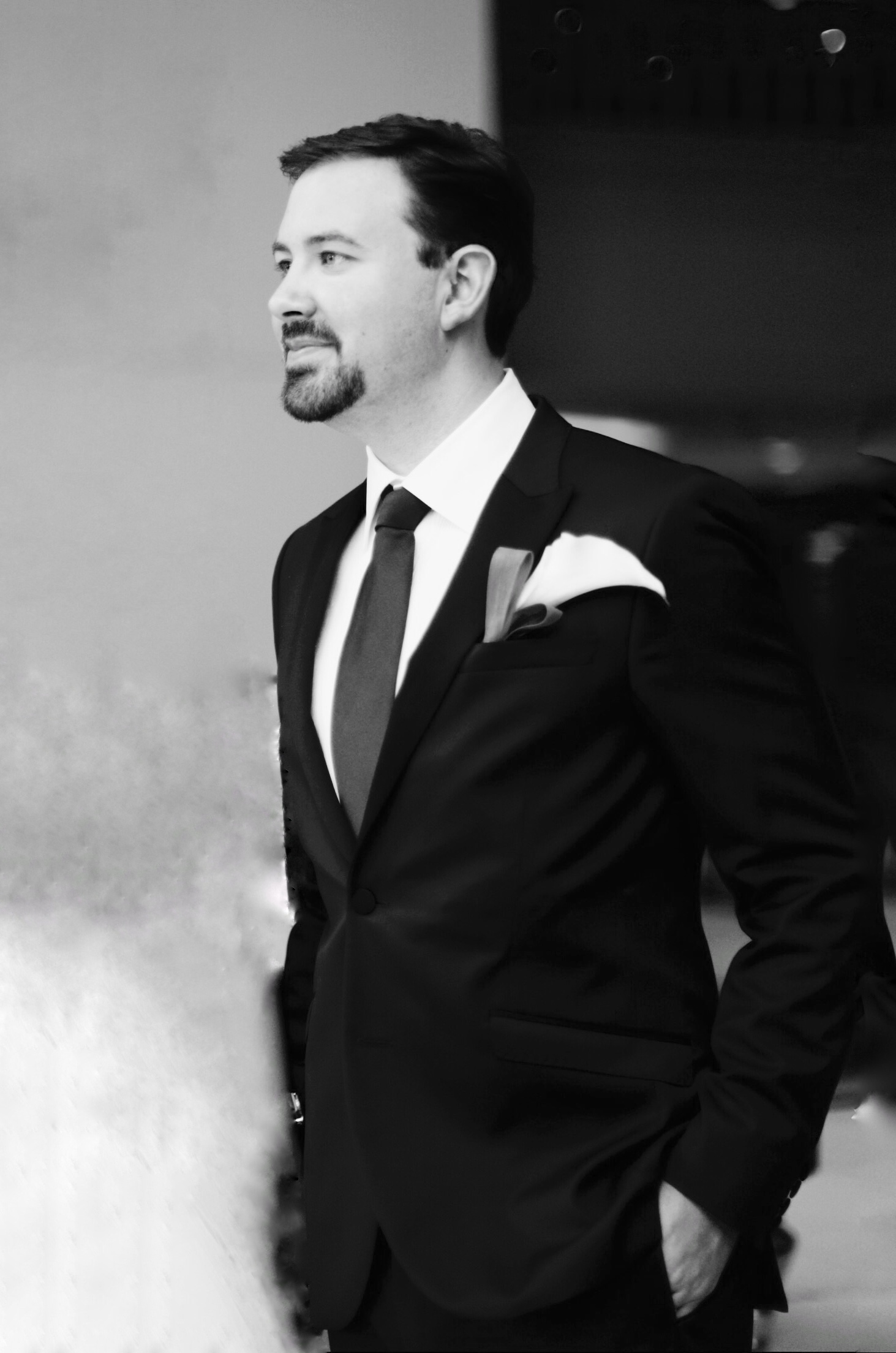

Jason Bahbak Mohaghegh is an Iranian-American philosopher and literary theorist whose works explore rising movements of world thought across both East and West, focusing on concepts of chaos, illusion, violence, disappearance, delirium, silence, madness, apocalypse, night, and futurity.

== Career ==
Mohaghegh completed his undergraduate and graduate studies at Columbia University, receiving a Ph.D. in both Comparative Literature and Middle Eastern Studies (2004). His dissertation focused on avant-garde paradigms of chaos across the Middle Eastern new wave and continental philosophy. He then taught for two years as a Visiting assistant professor at Columbia University from 2004 to 2006, with his first course being a graduate-level seminar titled “Extreme Literatures, East/West”

Currently, Mohaghegh is a Professor of Comparative Literature at Babson College. He is also the Programmer of Transdisciplinary Studies for the New Centre for Practice and Research where he has taught original seminars on Deception, Night, Neo-Madness, The Master, and Evil.

=== Early writing (On Chaos, Violence, Silence, and the Postmodern) ===
Mohaghegh’s first published book was The Chaotic Imagination: New Literature and Philosophy of the Middle East (2010). It examines vast poetic and philosophical dimensions of chaos in non-western literary vanguards and contains concept-maps for thematic chapters entitled First Annihilation, Desertion, Contagion, Shadow-Becoming, Inhuman, Second Annihilation, and Chaos-Consciousness.

His second book, titled Inflictions: The Writing of Violence in the Middle East (2012), then attempted the ambitious construction of a new philosophy/poetics of violence through the prism of obscure non-western texts, with chaptered reflections on The Zero-World, Threat (writings of betrayal), Annihilation (writings of cruelty), The Sharpening (writings of evil), Deception (writings of midnight), Rage (writings of overthrow), and Assassination (writings of war).

Mohaghegh’s third and fourth books were respectively titled The Radical Unspoken: Silence in Middle Eastern and Western Thought (2013) and Insurgent, Poet, Mystic, Sectarian: The Four Masks of an Eastern Postmodernism (2015). The first book unravels a comparative thread in the fascination with “silence” between certain visionaries of so-called Western thought—Friedrich Nietzsche, Georges Bataille, Maurice Blanchot, Antonin Artaud, Gaston Bachelard—alongside iconic luminaries of so-called Middle Eastern literature—Sadeq Hedayat, Nima Yushij, Forugh Farrokhzad, Mahmoud Darwish, Adonis, Joyce Mansour—to trace the relation of “the unspoken” to experiences of solitude, catastrophe, the dream, the body, and the outside. The second book, however, isolates four prototypes of extreme subjectivity—the insurgent (rebels), the poet (avant-garde writers), the mystic (here including experimental filmmakers), and the sectarian (founders of secret societies, undergrounds, cult factions)—to devise a rare alternative approach to the question of the postmodern age. The last two chapters on “The Sectarian”, however, are notably where Mohaghegh forwards his most original political-existential outlook on subversion (composed of thirty-three separate dreams of the sectarian followed by a manifesto of techniques/tactics)

Mohaghegh’s next works in this period included a translation of selected poems by the legendary Iranian poet Ahmad Shamlu titled Born Upon The Dark Spear (2015), a co-authored short book of images and thought-fragments titled Elemental Disappearances (with Dejan Lukic, 2016), a co-edited collection of original essays titled Manifestos for World Thought (with Lucian Stone, 2017), while also serving as invited guest editor for a special issue of the Comparative and Continental Philosophy (edition titled Soundproof Room; Volume 11, 2019).

=== Omnicide and Night Projects ===
Since 2018, Mohaghegh has been involved in the completion of two multi-volume projects (Omnicide and Night). The first project—consisting of Omnicide: Mania, Fatality, and the Future-In-Delirium (MIT Press/Urbanomic/Sequence, 2019) and Omnicide, Volume II: Mania, Doom, and the Future-In-Deception (MIT/Urbanomic/Sequence, 2022)—forged a configuration of over 150 distinct manic categories (cataptromania: the obsession with mirrors; thalassomania: the obsession with the sea; colossomania: the obsession with giants) to break open unforeseen realms of madness or delirium that went beyond psychoanalytic models of dementia, derangement, delusion, schizophrenia, hysteria, paranoia, melancholia, and obsession

The second/final volume continues along such manic trajectories while also punctuated by four chapters titled The Book of the Eleventh Hour (philosophy of doom), The Book of the Opium Den (philosophy of smoke), The Book of Poor Games (philosophy of play), and The Book of the Liar (philosophy of deception).

Simultaneously, Mohaghegh composed two compendia of essays on the subject of Night—Night: Philosophy of the After-Dark (2020) and Night, Volume II: A Philosophy of the Last World (2022). The first volume made four cross-temporal excursions into varying philosophical-aesthetic backdrops of the after-dark—1) ancient myths, gods, and rituals of night; 2) medieval mystical cosmologies of night; 3) modernist East Asian literatures of night (Japanese storytelling); 4) futuristic architecture and visual art of night—and concluded with a short meditation on the image of a fallen revolutionary leader who died frozen in the snow at midnight.

== Selected works ==
- The Chaotic Imagination: New Literature and Philosophy of the Middle East (Palgrave, 2010)
- Inflictions: The Writing of Violence in the Middle East (Continuum, 2012)
- The Radical Unspoken: Silence in Middle Eastern and Western Thought (Routledge, 2013)
- Insurgent, Poet, Mystic, Sectarian: The Four Masks of an Eastern Postmodernism (SUNY Press, 2015)
- Born Upon the Dark Spear: Selected Poems of Ahmad Shamlu (translation; Contra Mundum, 2016)
- Elemental Disappearances (co-authored with Dejan Lukic; Punctum Books, 2016)
- Manifestos for World Thought (co-edited with Lucian Stone, Rowman & Littlefield, 2017)
- Omnicide: Mania, Fatality, and the Future-In-Delirium (Urbanomic/Sequence Press, 2019)
- Night: A Philosophy of the After-Dark (Zero Books, 2020)
- Night, Volume II: A Philosophy of the Last World (Zero Books, 2022)
- Omnicide, Volume II: Mania, Doom, and the Future-In-Deception (MIT/Urbanomic/Sequence, 2023)
