= Hassan Kamshad =

Iranian translator (1925–2025)

Hassan Kamshad (Persian: حسن کامشاد; 25 June 1925 – 22 May 2025) was an Iranian translator and researcher of Persian literature. He was a professor of Persian language at the University of Cambridge and a visiting professor at the University of California, and an official of the National Iranian Oil Company.

Kamshad's most important translation is What is History by H.A. Kar and his most notable work is The Founders of Modern Persian Prose.

Kamshad died on 22 May 2025, at the age of 99.

== Media portrayals ==
The documentary Hadith Nafs directed by Mohammad Naseri Rad portrays Kamshad's life.
