= The Benefits of Vegetarianism =

1927 book by Sadegh Hedayat

The Benefits of Vegetarianism (Persian: فواید گیاهخواری, Favāyed-e giyāhkhāri), published in 1927, by the Iranian writer Sadegh Hedayat, is considered to be one of the most important and influential works written in Persian about animal rights and vegetarianism. It is the more complete edition of Hedayat's older book on animal rights, titled Men and Animals (Persian: انسان و حیوان, Ensān va Heyvān). Some vegan parties in Iran, view Sadegh Hedayat as the father of Iran's modern vegetarianism movement.
