= Sadegh Hedayat =

Iranian writer (1903–1951)

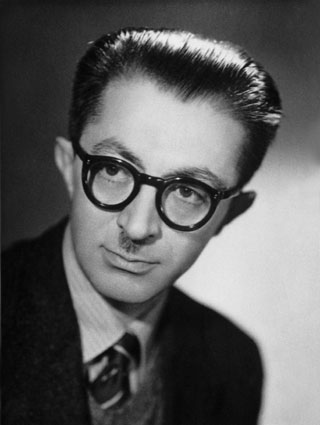
- The last photograph he posted from Paris to his relatives in Tehran, 1951.
- Born: 17 February 1903; Tehran, Iran
- Died: 4 April 1951 (aged 48); Paris, France
- Cause of death: committed suicide
- Resting place: Père Lachaise Cemetery
- Education: Dar ul-Funun; St. Louis School; University of Tehran
- Known for: Writer of prose fiction and short stories
- Notable work: The Blind Owl (Bufe kur); Buried Alive (Zende be gur); The Stray Dog (Sage velgard); Three Drops of Blood (Seh ghatreh khoon)

Sadegh Hedayat (Persian: صادق هدایت, Persian pronunciation: [ˈsɑːdɛq-ɛ hɛdɑːˈjæt]; 17 February 1903 – 9 April 1951) was an Iranian writer, translator, satirist, and poet. Best known for his novel The Blind Owl, he was one of the earliest Iranian writers to adopt literary modernism in their career. He is widely considered to be the father of the atheist movement in Iran.

== Early life and education ==
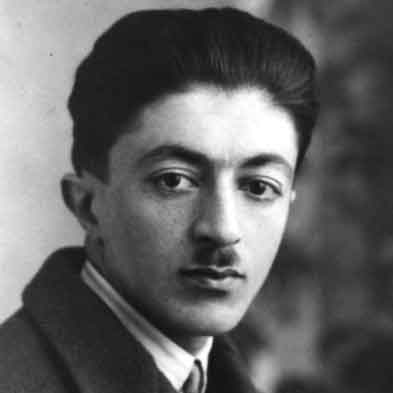
Young Sadegh Hedayat

Hedayat was born on 17 February 1903 in Tehran to a northern Iranian aristocratic family. His father was Hedayat-Qoli Khan (E'tezed al-Molk) and his mother was Zivar al-Moluk. He was the youngest son in the family, with two older brothers, Mahmoud and Issa, and three sisters.

His great-grandfather Reza-Qoli Khan Hedayat Tabarestani was a well-respected writer and worked in the government, as did other relatives. Hedayat's sister, Anvar al-Moluk, married Haj Ali Razmara, an army general and later Prime Minister of Iran under Mohammad Reza Pahlavi. Another sister was the wife of Abdollah Hedayat, who was also an army general.

Hedayat began his primary education at the Elmieh School in Tehran in 1908. In 1914, he started his secondary education at Dar ol-Fonoon, where he published a wall newspaper titled Nedaye Amvat (The Call of the Dead). However, due to a severe eye ailment, he left Dar ol-Fonoon in 1916 and continued his studies at Collège Saint-Louis, a French Catholic school. It was here that he first became acquainted with world literature.

At Collège Saint-Louis, Hedayat developed a deep interest in occult sciences and metaphysics. During this period, he also began practicing vegetarianism and published his first book, Man and Animal (1924), which focused on animal welfare, followed by The Benefits of Vegetarianism in 1927.

In 1925, he was among a select few students who traveled to Europe to continue their studies. Initially, he studied engineering in Belgium, but abandoned it after a year to pursue architecture and later dentistry in France. During this period, he became acquainted with Thérèse, a Parisian with whom he had a love affair. In 1927, Hedayat attempted suicide by throwing himself into the Marne but was rescued by a fishing boat. He finally returned to Iran in the summer of 1930 without receiving a degree and held various short-term administrative jobs.

== Career ==
Hedayat subsequently devoted his whole life to studying Western literature and to learning and investigating Iranian history and folklore. The works of Rainer Maria Rilke, Edgar Allan Poe, Franz Kafka, Anton Chekhov, and Guy de Maupassant intrigued him the most. During his short literary life span, Hedayat published a substantial number of short stories and novelettes, two historical dramas, a play, a travelogue, and a collection of satirical parodies and sketches. His writings also include numerous literary criticisms, studies in Persian folklore, and many translations from Middle Persian and French. He is credited with having brought the Persian language and literature into the mainstream of international contemporary writing.

Hedayat traveled and stayed in India from 1936 until late 1937 (the mansion he stayed in during his visit to Bombay was identified in 2014). Hedayet spent time in Bombay learning the Pahlavi (Middle Persian) language from the Parsi Zoroastrian community of India. He was taught by Bahramgore Tahmuras Anklesaria (also spelled as Behramgore Tehmurasp Anklesaria), a renowned scholar and philologist. Nadeem Akhtar's Hedayat in India provides details of Hedayat's sojourn in India. In Bombay Hedayat completed and published his most enduring work, The Blind Owl, which he had started writing, in Paris, as early as 1930. The book was praised by Henry Miller, André Breton, and others, and Kamran Sharareh has called it "one of the most important literary works in the Persian language".

== Vegetarianism ==
Hedayat was a vegetarian from his youth. From interviews with Hedayat’s brother Mahmud and schoolmates, historians agree that Hedayat was dedicated to the fate of animals and animal welfare from a young age. Hedayat’s education at St. Louis, a Catholic school in Tehran, introduced the young scholar to European philosophers like Arthur Schopenhauer (1788–1860), whose works influenced his ideas on the relationship between humans and animals.

Hedayat used the Persian word nabātī-khwār (Persian: نَبَاتِی‌خْوَار, romanized: nabātī-xwār, lit. 'plant-eater') to describe a person who is vegetarian. According to Hedayat, this means not eating meat, but allows for animal products like milk and eggs. For a person who uses an entirely vegan diet, he uses the term nabātī-khwārī-yi muṭlaq (Persian: نَبَاتِی‌خْوَارِیِ مُطْلَق, romanized: nabātī-xwārī-yi muṭlaq). Hedayat's view of vegetarianism was not only about diet; it also included sobriety and limiting processed foods.

=== Works on animal welfare ===
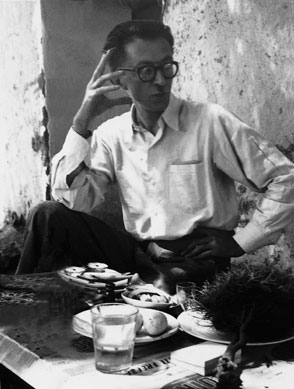
Hedayat at the age of 23

At the age of 21, Hedayat authored Man and Animal (1924), an essay that he later developed into the treatise The Benefits of Vegetarianism whilst in Berlin in 1927. In this essay, he describes the publications of the Société Végétarienne de France and the superiority of a vegetarian diet.

In The Benefits of Vegetarianism, Hedayat says:

If humankind must reach one day the pinnacle of progress and perfection, it will be in a natural environment with vegetable food, since eating meat and an artificial civilization will corrupt and draw humankind into the abyss of annihilation; unless a promising and blooming generation who live by the rules of nature will come in its place, humankind will be extinguished in shame

In addition to non-fiction essays, Hedayat also wrote short stories on the topic of animal welfare, written from the point of view of animals. His first short story, The speech of a donkey at the time of its death, follows a donkey narrator who describes the animal abuse he endured. The Stray Dog, a more famous work, follows the tragic life of a street dog. His magnum opus novel, The Blind Owl, portrays a butcher in a negative light.

Vegetarianism and animal rights were not a common topic to write about in Iran in the early twentieth century. Hedayat referenced numerous European scholars who wrote on vegetarianism in his works, such as Jules Lefèvre (1863–1944).

== Death and legacy ==
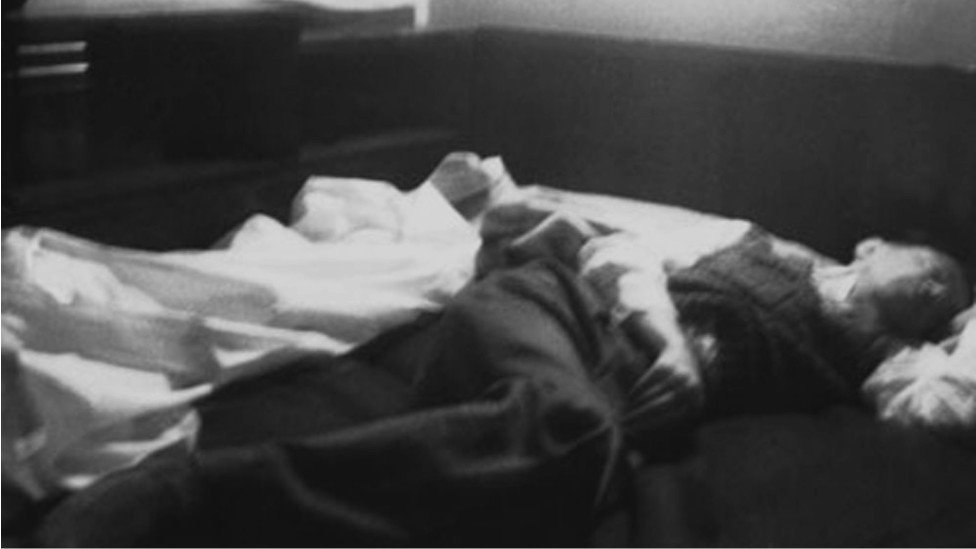
Hedayat's corpse in Paris, following his 9 April 1951 suicide

In 1951, overwhelmed by despair, Hedayat left Tehrān and traveled to Paris, where he rented an apartment. A few days before his death, Hedayat tore up all of his unpublished work. On 9 April 1951, he plugged all the doors and windows of his rented apartment with cotton, then turned on the gas valve, committing suicide by carbon monoxide poisoning. Two days later, his body was found by police, with a note left behind for his friends and companions that read, "I left and broke your heart. That is all." He is widely remembered as "a major symbol of Iranian nationalism."

The English poet John Heath-Stubbs published an elegy, "A Cassida for Sadegh Hedayat", in A Charm Against the Toothache in 1954.

== Censorship ==
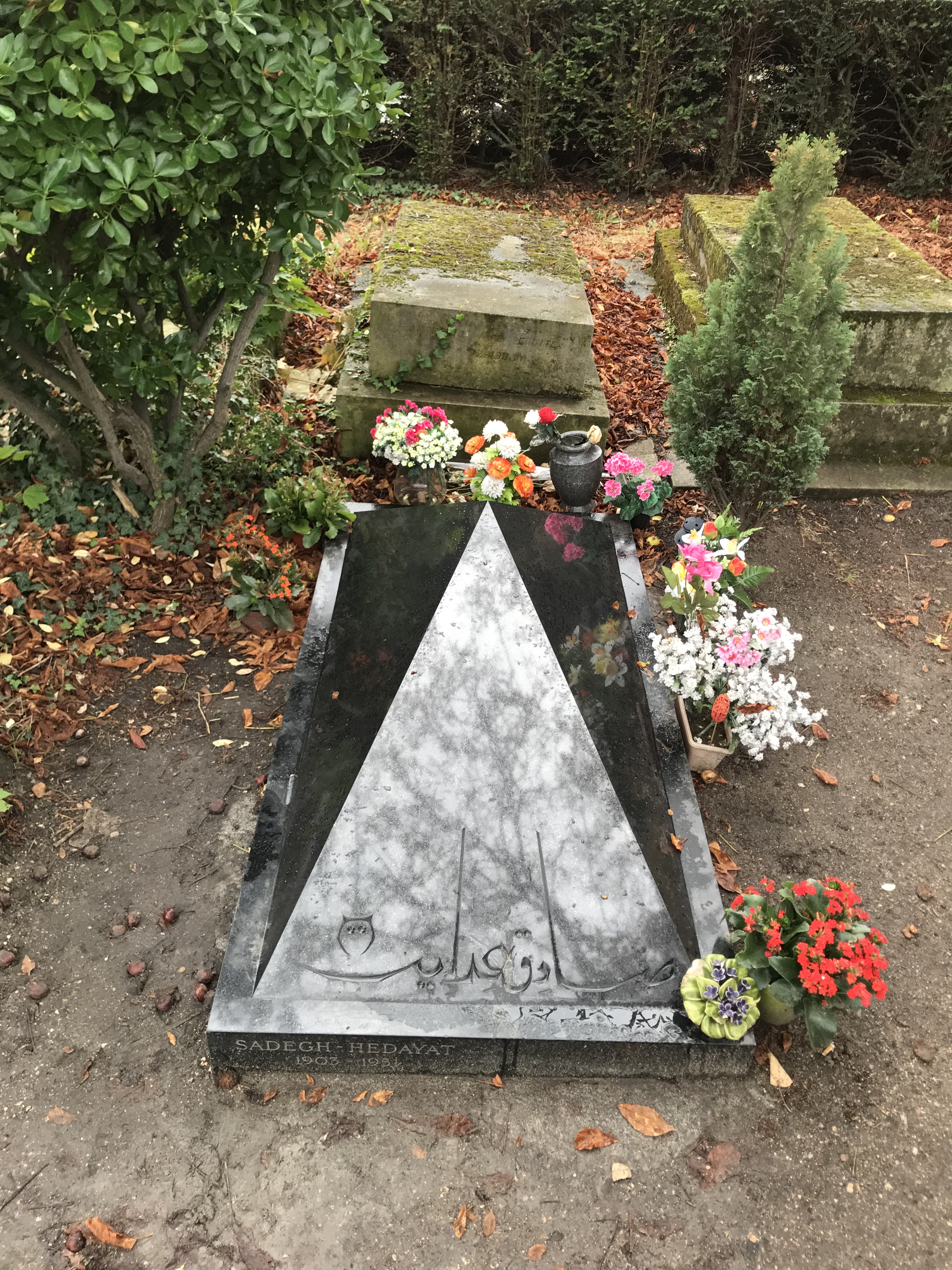
Tomb of Sadegh Hedayat, Père Lachaise Cemetery, Paris.

In November 2006, republication of Hedayat's work in uncensored form was banned in Iran, as part of a sweeping purge. However, surveillance of bookstalls is limited and it is still possible to purchase the originals second-hand. The official website is also still online. The issue of censorship is discussed in:

- "City Report: Tehran" in Frieze, issue 86, October 2004, which examines Iranian censorship in general;
- An article by Robert Tait in The Guardian, 17 November 2006;

== Quotations ==
=== The Blind Owl ===
In life there are certain sores that, like a canker, gnaw at the soul in solitude and diminish it.

— The Blind Owl, Opening line

== Works ==
- Fiction
  - 1930 Buried Alive (Zende be gūr) A collection of 9 short stories.
  - 1931 Mongol Shadow (Sāye-ye Moqol)
  - 1932 Three Drops of Blood (Se qatre khūn). A collection of 11 short stories.
  - 1933 Chiaroscuro (Sāye-ye roushan) A collection of 7 short stories.
  - 1934 Mister Bow Wow (Vagh Vagh Sahāb)
  - 1936 Sampingé (in French)
  - 1936 Lunatique (in French)
  - 1936 The Blind Owl (Boof-e koor)
  - 1942 The Stray Dog (Sag-e velgard). A collection of 8 short stories.
  - 1943 Lady Alaviyeh (Alaviye Khānum)
  - 1944 Velengārī (Tittle-tattle)
  - 1944 The Elixir of Life (Āb-e Zendegi)
  - 1945 The Pilgrim (Hājī āqā)
  - 1946 Tomorrow (Fardā)
  - 1947 The Pearl Cannon (Tūp-e Morvari)
- Drama (1930–1946)
  - Parvin dokhtar-e Sāsān (Parvin, Sassan's Daughter)
  - Māzīyār
  - Afsāne-ye āfarīnesh (The Fable of Creation)
- Travelogues
  - Esfahān nesf-e jahān (Isfahan: Half of the World)
  - Rū-ye jādde-ye namnāk (On the Wet Road), unpublished, written in 1935.
- Studies, Criticism and Miscellanea
  - Rubā'iyāt-e Hakim Omar-e Khayyām (Khayyam's Quatrains) 1923
  - Ensān va heyvān (Man and Animal) 1924
  - Marg (Death) 1927
  - Favāyed-e Giyāhkhāri (The Advantages of Vegetarianism) 1927
  - Hekāyat-e bā natije (The Story with a Moral) 1932
  - Neyrangestan (Neyrangestan: On Various Iranian Customs, Traditions, and Superstitions) 1933
  - Tarānehā-ye Khayyām (The Songs of Khayyam) 1934
  - Chāykovski (Tchaikovsky) 1940
  - Dar pirāmun-e Loqat-e Fārs-e Asadi (About Asadi's Persian Dictionary) 1940
  - Shive-ye novin dar tahqiq-e adabi (A New Method of Literary Research) 1940
  - Dāstan-e Nāz (The Story of Naz) 1941
  - Shivehā-ye novin dar she'r-e Pārsi (New Trends in Persian Poetry) 1941
  - A review of the film Molla Nasrud'Din 1944
  - A literary criticism on the Persian translation of Gogol's The Government Inspector 1944
  - Chand nokte dar bāre-ye Vis va Rāmin (Some Notes on Vis and Ramin) 1945
  - Payām-e Kāfkā (The Message of Kafka) 1948
  - Al-bi`tha al-Islamīya ilā al-bilād al-Afranjīya (The Islamic Mission to the European Lands), undated.
- Translations
  - From French:
    - 1931 Gooseberries by Anton Chekhov
    - 1948 In the Penal Colony by Franz Kafka
    - 1944 Before the Law by Franz Kafka
    - 1950 The Metamorphosis by Franz Kafka (along with Hasan Qaemian)
    - 1950 The Wall by Jean-Paul Sartre
    - 1950 Tales of Two Countries by Alexander Kielland
    - 1950 Blind Geronimo and his Brother by Arthur Schnitzler
  - From Pahlavi:
    - 1943 Kārname-ye Ardashir-e-Pāpākān (The Book of the Deeds of Ardashir [son of] Papakan)
    - 1940 Gojaste Abālish
    - 1945 Āmadan-e shāh Bahrām-e Varjavand (Return of shah Bahram Varjavand)
    - 1944 Zand-i Wahman yasn

== Films about Hedayat ==
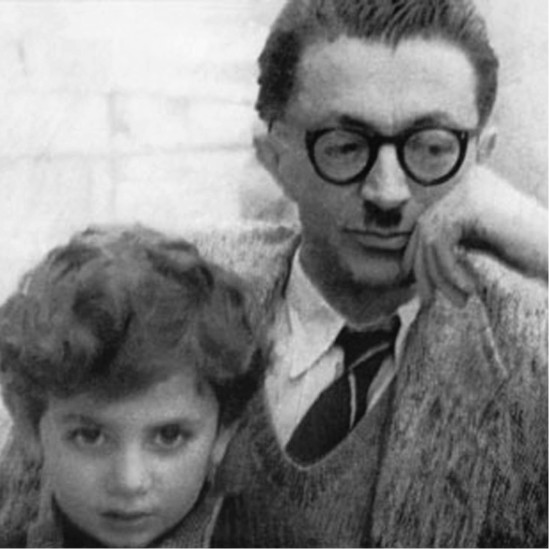
Sadegh Hedayat and Rozbeh, son of Sadeq Chubak

- In 1987, Raul Ruiz made the feature film La Chouette aveugle in France: a loose adaption of Hedayat's novel The Blind Owl. Its formal innovations led critics and filmmakers to declare the film 'French cinema's most beautiful jewel of the past decade.'
- Hedayat's last day and the night was adapted into the short film, The Sacred and the Absurd, directed by Ghasem Ebrahimian, which was featured in the Tribeca Film Festival in 2004.
- In 2005, Iranian film director Khosrow Sinai has made a docudrama about Hedayat entitled Goftogu ba saye = Talking with a shadow. Its main theme is the influence of Western movies such as Der Golem, Nosferatu, and Dracula on Hedayat.
- In 2009, Mohsen Shahrnazdar and Sam Kalantari made a documentary film about Sadegh Hedayat named From No. 37.

== See also ==
- Intellectual movements in Iran
- Persian literature
- Persian philosophy

== Sources ==
- Hassan Kamshad, Modern Persian Prose Literature ISBN 0-936347-72-4
- Acquaintance with Sadegh Hedayat, by M. F. Farzaneh, Publisher: Markaz, Tehran, 2008.
- Sadeq Hedayat, the foremost short story writer of Iran
- The Sacred and the Absurd, a film about Hedayat's death

== Further references ==
- Homa Katouzian, Sadeq Hedayat: Life and legend of an Iranian writer, I.B. Tauris, 2000. ISBN 1-86064-413-9
- Hassan Kamshad, Modern Persian Prose Literature, Ibex Publishers, 1996. ISBN 0-936347-72-4
- Michael C. Hillmann, Hedayat's "The Blind Owl" Forty Years After, Middle East Monograph No. 4, Univ of Texas Press, 1978.
- Iraj Bashiri, Hedayat's Ivory Tower: Structural Analysis of The Blind Owl, Minneapolis, Minnesota, 1975.
- Iraj Bashiri, The Fiction of Sadeq Hedayat, 1984.
- Sayers, Carol, The Blind Owl and Other Hedayat Stories, Minneapolis, Minnesota, 1984.
- What is left for me from Sadegh Hedayat? Excerpt from "Sadegh Hadayat: Dar Tare Ankaboot" (In the Spider's Web), by M. F. Farzaneh, 2005.
- Hedayat's last night out in Paris Excerpt from M. F. Farzaneh's "Ashenayee ba Sadegh Hedayat" (Knowning Sadegh Hedayat), 2004.
