= Michael Craig Hillmann =

American professor of Persian studies (born 1940)

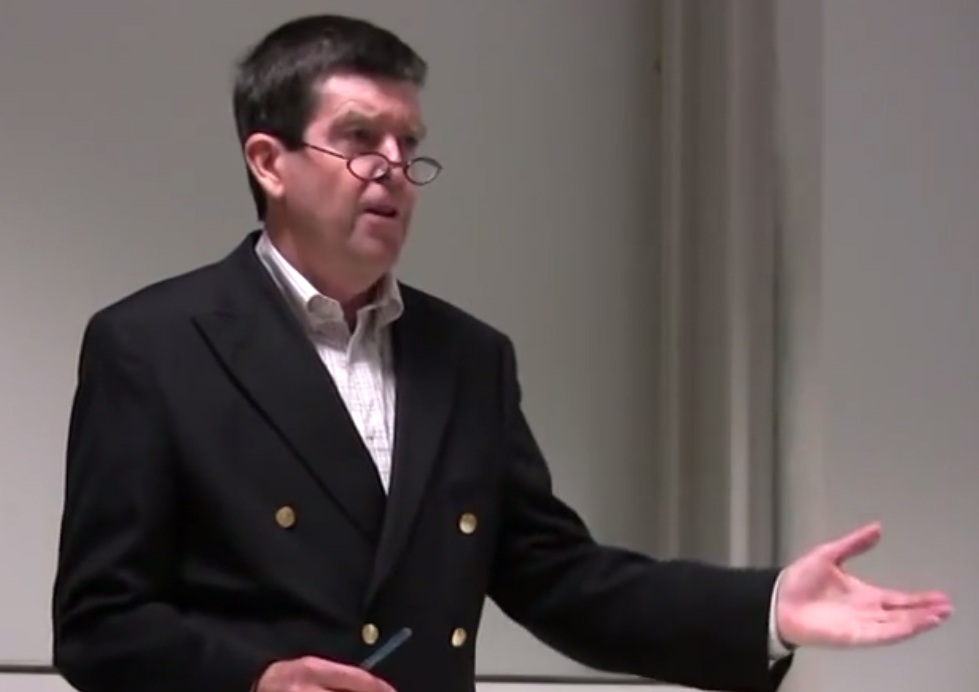
- This picture was taken in Hafez Shenasi meeting
- Born: May 5, 1940 (age 86); Baltimore, Maryland
- Education: Loyola University Maryland (BA); University of Chicago (MA, PhD)

Michael Craig Hillmann (born May 5, 1940) is professor of Persian Studies at the University of Texas at Austin and President of Persepolis Institute, Inc. He has published widely on Persian language and literature and specializes in lyric Persian verse, Persian prose fiction from the 1920s through the 1970s, and literary autobiography. Since the late 1990s, he has focused on Persian instructional materials development, resulting in, among other things, a new Persian language learning syllabus in four volumes called "Persian for America(ns)."

He has published two autobiographical books titled From Durham to Tehran (1991) and From Classroom to Courtroom (2008). In From Classroom to Courtroom, he tells the story of how academics at the Middle Eastern Studies department became involved in cross-cultural conflicts which resulted in official complaints, allegations of abuse, discrimination, harassment, racism, and a lawsuit against the university. Hillmann is at work on a third and final autobiographical essay called To and From a Maine Village and a new Persian dictionary for Hippocrene Books.

== Selected publications ==
- From Classroom to Courtroom (AuthorHouse 2008) ISBN 1434350622
- Tajiki Textbook and Reader: Second Edition (Dunwoody Press 2003) ISBN 1881265986
- Basic Tajik(i) Word List (Dunwoody Press 2003) ISBN 1931546002
- Persian Vocabulary Acquisition, 2nd ed. (Dunwoody Press 2003) ISBN 1881265838
- Reading Iran Reading Iranians, 2nd ed. rev. (Dunwoody Press 2002) ISBN 1881265773
- Persian Listening (Dunwoody Press, 2008) ISBN 9781931546560
