= Three Drops of Blood =

1932 short story collection by Sadegh Hedayat

- Author: Sadegh Hedayat
- Original title: سه قطره خون
- Language: Persian
- Subject: Stories
- Published: 1932
- Publisher: Amirkabir
- Publication place: Iran
- Pages: 179

Three Drops of Blood (Persian: سه قطره خون) is a short story collection written by Iranian author Sadegh Hedayat. Published in 1932, it includes 11 short stories. The story is often considered a precursor to The Blind Owl.

== Short stories ==
- Three Drops of Blood
- Gerdab (whirlpool)
- Dash Akol
- Broken mirror
- Asking for forgiveness
- Laleh
- Masks
- Fork
- The man who killed his ego
- Mohlal
- Gojasteh Dezh
