= Dingo–dog hybrid =

Australian hybrid animal

A Dingo–dog hybrid is a cross between a dingo and a domestic dog. The current population of free ranging domestic dogs in Australia is probably higher than in the past. However, the proportion of the so-called "pure" dingoes (dogs with exclusively-dingo ancestry) has been on the decrease over the last few decades due to hybridisation and is regarded as further decreasing.

Because of this ongoing interbreeding of dingoes and domestic dogs and the resulting hybrids, there is a much wider range of colours and body shapes today among the Australian wild dog population than in the time before the human introduction of domestic dogs. The full extent of the effects of this process is currently unknown and the possibility of potential problems, as well as the wish to preserve the "pure" dingo, often leads to a strong rejection of the interbreeding.

In 2019, a study of 402 wild and captive dingoes using 195,000 points across the dingo genome indicates that past studies of hybridisation were over-estimated and that pure dingoes are more common than they were originally thought to be.

In 2021, DNA testing of over 5,000 wild-living canines from across Australia found that 31 were feral domestic dogs and 27 were first generation hybrids. This finding challenges the perception that dingoes are nearly extinct and have been replaced by feral domestic dogs.

== Causes ==
Dingoes arrived in Australia together with seafarers four millennia ago, and reverted to the wild there. The dingo has been proven to have existed on the continent for at least 3,500 years, which was confirmed by archaeological as well as genetic examinations and findings. Additionally, it was suspected that there was later no significant introduction of other domestic dogs before the arrival of the Europeans.

European domestic dogs arrived in Australia in the 18th century, during the European colonization. Since then, some of those dogs dispersed into the wild (both deliberately and accidentally) and founded feral populations, especially in places where the dingo numbers had been severely reduced due to human intervention. Although there are few records of such releases, their occurrence is supported by reports of free-living dogs of specific breeds being seen or captured in remote areas. The spread of farming and grazing activities in the 19th century led to a further spread of other domestic dogs, both pet and feral ones. Interbreeding with the native dingoes has probably been occurring since the arrival of domestic dogs in the year 1788.

== Forms ==
Dingoes and domestic dogs interbreed freely with each other and therefore the term "wild dog" is often used for describing all dingoes, dingo-hybrids and other feral domestic dogs, because the borders between the three are unclear.

Interbreeding of dingoes and domestic dogs is not necessarily unintended and dingoes have been used for the breeding of certain dog breeds. These breeding attempts started in the 19th century. The only attempt to date that was regarded as successful was the breeding of the Australian Cattle Dog. It is possible that the Australian Kelpie is descended from dingoes too; however, that has not been proven.

Occasionally claims are made that interbreeding of dingoes and domestic dogs together with successful rearing of hybrids is a rare phenomenon in the wild due to supposedly radical differences in behaviour and biology and the harshness of the wilderness. However, cases of dogs that came from human households but nonetheless manage to survive on their own (even by active hunting) and to successfully rear pups have been consistently proven. German behaviourist Eberhard Trumler (regarded as a Nestor of cynology in the German speaking world) believed that cross-breeds of dingoes and shepherd dogs might have good chances of surviving in the wild. In addition Alfred Brehm already reported of interbreeding of dingoes and domestic dogs of both sexes. There are even reports of dingo-like wild dogs mating with restrained female domestic dogs.

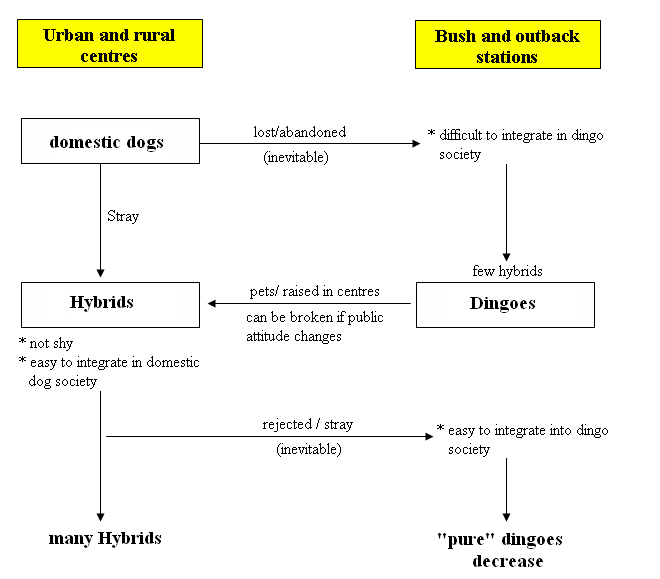
Diagram on interbreeding of dingoes and other domestic dogs (after Corbett 1995a)

The rate of interbreeding increases when dingoes come to urban centres, due to the prospect of easily accessible food resources. However, since interactions between dingoes and feral domestic dogs in the bush differ greatly from those in urban places, so too do the rates of hybridisation. It is known that domestic dogs get lost in the bush time and again. However; it is assumed that the behavioural differences between dingoes and domestic dogs are big enough to make it difficult for these dogs to be integrated into dingo-society and successfully breed, especially in remote areas. A further spreading of hybrids might hasten the process of interbreeding by reducing behavioural differences. This could partially explain the higher proportion of dingo-hybrids in Southeast Australia. The most likely possibility is that the territorial behaviour of established dingo-packs, which keeps away all foreign dogs (dingoes included) and prevents them from breeding, curbs the rate of interbreeding. Dingoes owned by humans as pets are likely to use their owner's home as a base from which to roam, or are abandoned when they reach adulthood. The result of this pet trend is that contacts between dingoes and domestic dogs are increasing; because pet dingoes grow up without learning the social behaviours that curb mating and therefore crossbreeding. Many such hybrids are rejected by owners or stray to the bush where they may breed with "pure" dingoes. In addition it is proven that hybrids can appear when dingoes mate with livestock guardian dogs; interbreeding can even occur with dogs that were acquired by their owners to specifically kill dingoes.

There is currently no evidence that the known measures for the control of dingoes and other wild dogs are effectively able to slow the process of interbreeding. It seems rather to be that these controls hasten the process of interbreeding since it breaks up traditional pack structures and therefore causes some mechanisms of population control to disappear.

== Degree of interbreeding ==
Dingo-samples that have been collected in the 1960s and 1970s indicated that half of the wild dogs of southern Tasmania were dingo-hybrids; analyses from the early 1980s supported the trend of increasing interbreeding. Based on skull features researchers found out that the proportion of "pure" dingoes in the highlands of the Southeast decreased from 49% in the 1960s to 17% in the 1980s. During examinations in the year 1985 in Southeast-Australia only 55% of the 407 studied "dingoes" weren't hybrids. 36% of the dogs were dingo-hybrids and the rest wild dogs of other origin. In the middle of the 1980s the proportion of "pure" dingoes to dingo-hybrids in Central Australia was estimated (based on skull features) to be 97.5% and 2.4% respectively. In contrast, in Southeast-Australia the estimates were 55.3% and 33.92% respectively. It was reasoned from these findings that mixed populations can be expected in areas where human settlements exist and wild dogs remain, furthermore that hybrids can be expected to be rarer in remote areas. Broken colour-patterns, red with white, black or bluish spots, completely black, brown or bluish, black-and-white and piebald striped patterns were also more prevalent in the second area (34.8%) than in the first (5.7%). In Southeast-Australia there were no differences between areas near farmlands and forest concerning the frequency of the colourations. Many of these colourations also occurred in breeding experiments of reddish dingoes with variously coloured other domestic dogs. All in all about 50% of the populations in Eastern and Southern Australia consisted of hybrids in the 1980s. Depending on the area in Southeast-Australia it was estimated that the proportion of "pure" dingoes was at least 22% and at its most 65%. 100 dog skulls from the Queensland Museum were measured and analysed, to determine the frequency of dingoes in the dog-populations of Queensland. The highest frequency of dingoes (95%) was found among skulls from central Queensland and the highest frequency of other domestic dogs and dingo-hybrids (50%) was found in the Southeast of the state. K'gari had only a low frequency of hybrids (17%) that were mostly limited to the southern half of the island. It was estimated back then that the proportion of dingo-hybrids in the continent-wide population was about 78%. At the turn of the millennium only 74% of 180 skulls from seven main areas of Australia could be classified as dingo-skulls during measurements and none of the populations consisted exclusively of dingoes. According to Laurie Corbett some examined wild dog populations in New South Wales consisted entirely of hybrids.

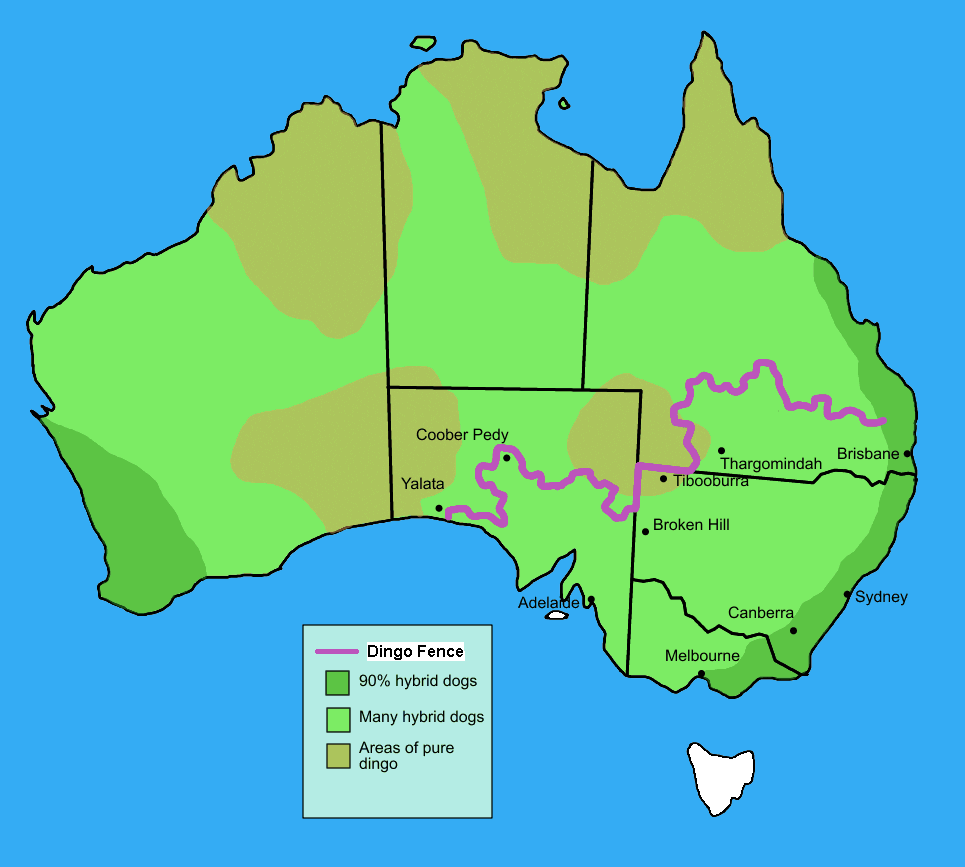
Distribution of hybrid dingoes in Australia

Hybrids of dingoes and other domestic dogs are considered to exist in all populations worldwide today. Their proportion is regarded as increasing and completely "pure" populations may no longer exist. However, the exact extent of this interbreeding is unknown. This process might have reached such a high extent that there are big populations that consist entirely of hybrids. Traditional methods for the identification for dingoes, dingo-hybrids and other domestic dogs (based on skull features, breeding patterns and fur colour) also indicate that interbreeding is widespread and occurs in all populations of Australia, especially in the East and the South of the continent. Based on skull features there are only a few "pure" dingoes left in New South Wales and the "pure" form might be locally extinct in the highlands of the Southeast. Even in areas that were once regarded as safe for "pure" dingoes, like the Kakadu national park or parts of the Northern Territory, dingo-hybrids now appear on the border zones of bush and settlements. In addition, hybrids have been spotted in northern Australia and in remote regions.

According to some sources, the dog population of Southeast Australia and along the East Coast now consists to 90% of dingo-hybrids, other sources state that the dog population along the East Coast consists to 80% of hybrids and only 15% to 20% of the dingoes in Southeast-Australia and South-Queensland are supposed to be "pure". In the Southwest of Australia and the interior of Queensland the 90-95% of the dingoes might be "pure". Genetic analyses during the last years came to the conclusion that the populations of wild dogs in the southern Blue Mountains consists of 96.8% dingo-hybrids. The statements (respectively estimations) on how many dingo-hybrids there are in the whole of Australia are very high but not homogeneous. Sometimes statements appear saying that most populations contain 80% hybrids or that 80% or 90% of all Australian wild dogs are dingo-hybrids.

However, these hybrids don't necessarily have to be of low dingo-content. During an analysis of 56 wild dogs in Southeast-Queensland the researchers found that these dogs had a dingo-content of more than 50% or were "pure" dingoes. "Pure" feral dogs of other origin or hybrids with low dingo-content could not be found. Therefore, it was reasoned that the wild dogs of Brisbane and the Sunshine Coast are the descendants of dingoes, instead of escaped or rejected dogs. During studies on wild dogs of the Kosciuszko national park, many hybrids were found but these dogs were of relatively high dingo-content.

In 2011, a total of 3,941 samples were included in the first continent-wide DNA study of wild dogs. The study found that 46% were pure dingoes which exhibited no dog alleles (gene expressions). There was evidence of hybridisation in every region sampled. In Central Australia only 13% were hybrids, however in southeastern Australia 99% were hybrids or feral dogs. Pure dingo distribution was 88% in the Northern Territory, intermediate numbers in Western Australia, South Australia and Queensland, and 1% in New South Wales and Victoria. Almost all wild dogs showed some dingo ancestry, with only 3% of dogs showing less than 80% dingo ancestry. This indicates that domestic dogs have a low survival rate in the wild or that most hybridisation is the result of roaming dogs that return to their owners. No populations of feral dogs have been found in Australia.

== Identification ==
There are a couple of external features that can be used to distinguish "pure" dingoes from other "pure" domestic dogs. However this might not be the case when concerning mixed-breed dogs and especially dingo-hybrids.

Dingo-like domestic dogs and dingo-hybrids can be generally distinguished from "pure" dingoes because of coat colour, since they have a wider range of colours and patterns than dingoes. However, even among "pure" dingoes, there is a wide variation of colours. According to the Australian Museum, a dingo's coat colour is largely determined by the area it inhabits. Generally, the coat colour is ginger with white feet. In the desert, dingoes are more golden yellow while in forested and bush areas they are a darker tan to black. Also reports by early settlers in the Blue Mountains region of NSW described dingoes which had wide variations in coat colours. Additionally the dog-typical form of barking appears among dingo-hybrids.

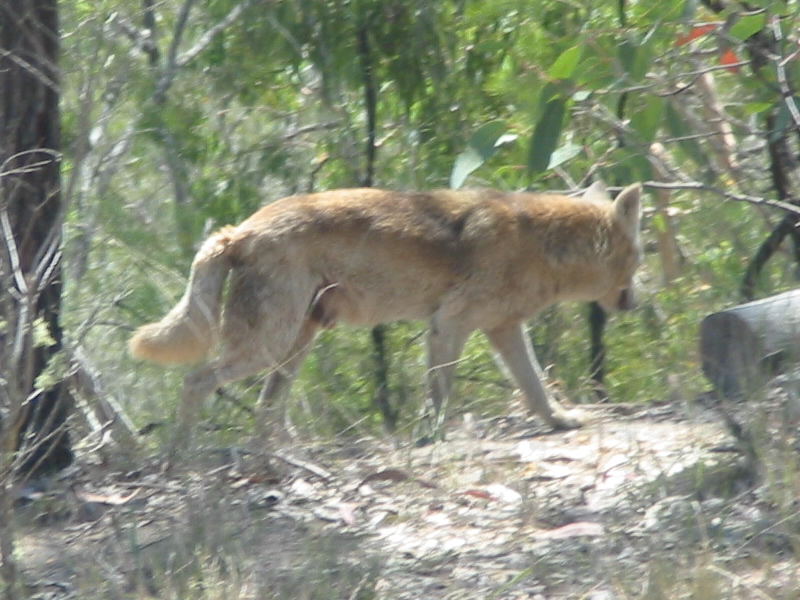
Although dingo-like, this wild dog has an atypical colouration and is therefore most likely a dingo-crossbreed

At the end of the 1970s it was found out that the skulls of dingoes can be distinguished from those of other domestic dogs based on alveolar distance along lower premolars, maxillary width, bulla volume, crown width of upper carnassial tooth, basal length of upper canine and width of nasal bones. To determine the possibility of dingo-hybrids in the wild, hybrids were bred in captivity in the 1970s and the start of the 1980s. Thereby differences in skull features were all the bigger the nearer the hybrid was genetically to other domestic dogs. Even a non-dingo content of about 25% to 12.5% lead to a significant difference when compared to the 8 dingo parents. Unlike dingoes other feral domestic dogs and dingo-hybrids are theoretically capable to come in heat twice annually and tend to have a breeding cycle less influenced by the seasons. However, it is considered to be unlikely that they are capable of rearing two litters per year in the wild since this would require much time and energy. Successful rearing of two successive litters would probably only be possible in the wild under very favourable conditions and there is currently no proof that it ever happened in the wild.

During observation at the start of the 1990s captive hybrids did not show the same breeding pattern like "pure" dingoes and many testicle-parameters did not show the same seasonal variations. Furthermore, they had bigger litters and some were able to reproduce over the whole year. Concerning the duration of the pregnancy there was no evidence for any differences.

Although hybrids may have a weight up to 60 kg (supposedly even up to 70 kg), most hybrids do not weigh more than 20 kg, which is considered to be within the normal range for dingoes. Furthermore, during breeding-experiments there could be no differences in growth patterns of dingoes and similar sized crossbreeds found. Additionally, the average age of wild living domestic dogs in Australia is also not higher than what is considered normal for dingoes.

A genetic discrimination is possible but difficult, since there are only a few genetic characteristics that differentiate dingoes from other domestic dogs. A couple of years ago, some scientists from the University of New South Wales developed a relatively reliable method with 20 genetic "fingerprints" using DNA from skin and blood samples to determine the "purity" of a dingo. If one of these "fingerprints" would be found, this would indicate that the examined dog is possibly a hybrid and not a "pure" dingo. The reference group for this test was a group of captive dingoes, thought to cover the whole range of the dingo population. Samples that lay outside of this range would be regarded as hybrids. With increasing development this method might be possible to use on hair and scat samples and provide more exact results.

In 2016, a three dimensional geometric morphometric analysis of the skulls of dingoes, dogs and their hybrids found that dingo-dog hybrids exhibit morphology closer to the dingo than to the parent group dog. Hybridisation did not push the unique Canis dingo cranial morphology towards the wolf phenotype, therefore hybrids cannot be distinguished from dingoes based on cranial measures. The study suggests that the wild dingo morphology is dominant when compared with the recessive dog breed morphology, and concludes that although hybridisation introduces dog DNA into the dingo population, the native cranial morphology remains resistant to change.

=== Problems in identification ===
Despite all the characteristics that may be used to differentiate a dingo from other domestic dogs, there are several problems.

There is no clarity on the subject from which point on a dog is considered a "pure" dingo. There are conflicting opinions in literature on what defines a dingo. The following problems occurred frequently:

- Geographic variations in the allometry of dingo skulls were not taken into account, when dingoes from Central Australia were used as standard for the "purity" of dingoes.
- Genetic variations of dingoes in captivity were not taken into account, when the genetic markers for "purity" were selected
- Methods for the collection of samples, to determine a dingo via genetic testing, are susceptible for flaws in the identification (e.g. mistakes during collecting of the samples)
- Microsatellites have been used to determine the "purity"; however an examination of microsatellite data indicated that they are only useful for making conclusion on relatedness
- New research results show that chemicals can influence the gene expression and development of the neural crest during the early stages of the embryonic development

From this data it was reasoned that characteristics of dingoes from geographic isolated areas differ from each other and different populations might not be consistent with common description of a dingo.

No distinguishing characteristic is currently one-hundred-percent reliable. Furthermore, results gained under captive conditions cannot be transferred one-on-one to the situation in the wild, because it is not known which characteristics permanently remain under the conditions of natural selection. Biology and behaviour of dingoes and other wild dogs are generally considered to be so similar, that it is difficult to discriminate between them. Furthermore, much of the information on dingoes might just as likely apply to any other wild dog in Australia. In addition, the external characteristics of living dingoes cannot always be reliably distinguished from dingo-hybrids; since many hybrids are visually indistinguishable from "pure" dingoes (e.g. hybrids resulting from mating with Australian Cattle Dogs). Even the colour variations, which are regarded as characteristics of the "pure" dingo, can be a hindrance when identifying hybrids and other domestic dogs, when they show the same colourations. Furthermore, historical records report black dingoes but did not mention black-and-tan ones. This colouration might have been overlooked; if not than this would be another feature of hybrids. During breeding experiments with dingoes and other domestic dogs, dogs were born that could not be distinguished from dingoes based on external features but had two heat-cycles annually even down to the third and fourth generation. In the case of skull features there is the problem that they don't discriminate between the different degrees of dingo-content in the hybrids, are less and less effective the further the hybrid is genetically away from other domestic dogs and can only be used on already dead specimen. Methods like X-ray and CAT-Scans are possible, but impractical. Also, signs of dingo attacks on livestock are not reliable as a distinguishing characteristic, since the attack methods and the success rate possible depends the most from the experience and motivation of the attacker and the reactions of the prey.

Although genetic testing can theoretically determine whether an individual is a hybrid, "pure" dingo or another domestic dog, mistakes in results cannot be excluded. To get reliable data from genetic testing, suitable and sufficient genetic material from the period before the European colonization should be available for comparison, which is currently not the case. Even genetic testing is less effective, the further away the non-dingo is in the dog's ancestry and it is possible that the hybrid had not inherited any genes which were ascribed to other domestic dogs during examinations. Furthermore, even in the case of a "pure" dingo, genetic testing might show results that were not present in the used reference group.

Besides, the different methods for identification of hybrids (DNA, skull features and fur colour) can lead to different results that might be in conflict with each other. During the before-mentioned analysis of 56 wild dogs in southeast Queensland, there was 17.9% conformity between the three used methods for determine the "purity". The conformity between DNA and skull features was lowest. During this a hitherto unknown form of the "pure" dingo was discovered (based on DNA and skull features): a white dog with orange spots on the fur. This variant was considered as a single mutation or the result of interbreeding with an isolated dingo population.

Contrary to constantly recurring claims of radical differences in behaviour and biology, a single annual breeding cycle, seasonal adapted oestrus, monogamy, parental care by the males, regulation of breeding via ecological and social factors, and howling have all been observed among domestic dogs of most diverse backgrounds. Howling is considered normal for all wild dogs of Australia. Hybrids as well as other domestic dogs have been observed in tight pack structures and free-ranging domestic dogs in Southeast-Australia have been observed hunting and foraging in groups. Free-ranging dogs in Victoria were generally observed in pairs (54%) or alone (34%), with packs of three to seven dogs in 12% of the sightings. Furthermore, there are also reports of dingoes with more than average size and weight and cases where hybrids were successfully used as working and companion dogs and the Australian Cattle Dog was proven to have dingo ancestors. A generally higher aggression of hybrids could not be confirmed by owners, who worked with respectively investigated them; furthermore hitherto observations and encounters with hybrids in the wild did not reveal any evidence, that hybrids are generally more aggressive than "pure" dingoes.

== Importance and effect of hybridisation ==
Interbreeding with domestic dogs is regarded as the greatest threat to the survival of the "pure" dingo. Genetic analyses, observations and skull measurements over the course of several years strongly indicate that in approximately 50 years the "pure" dingo will have disappeared in the wild and that it is no longer possible to preserve them. The dingo researcher Laurie Corbett considers that, given the current rate of interbreeding, there will be no more "pure" dingoes in the wild in Victoria in 20 years. The president of the Dingo Conservation Association Barry Oakman was, in an interview in the year 2003, of the opinion that without appropriate measures the "pure" dingo would be extinct in the wild in 30 years, in New South Wales possibly in less than 10 years. According to other statements the "pure" dingoes are either close to extinction or they will be close to it over the course of the next 20 years. It is assumed that, should the process go on unhindered, the increasing number of genes from domestic dogs will effectively lead to the extinction on the Australian continent of the dingo as a separate subspecies by 2100 and that the dog population will then consist of hybrids and other feral dogs.

=== Opinions on hybridisation ===
Fear of interbreeding of dingoes with domestic dogs is no phenomenon of the last years and already led to a ban on the import of German Shepherd Dogs to Australia by the Commonwealth of Nations in 1929. It was feared that the German Shepherds (partly due to the old name "Alsatian Wolfdog") would be a danger to sheep, become friendly with dingoes and possibly interbreed with them. This ban was first relaxed in 1972 and repealed in 1974.

This phenomenon is a problem for some people and for others not. In the scientific area, there are two main positions concerning the process of interbreeding:

- The "pure" dingo should be preserved
- Populations of wild dogs should be preserved, no matter whether they are hybrids or not.

The first position is probably the most common one. It means that the "pure" dingo should be preserved via strong control measures and only "pure" or mostly "pure" dingoes should get protection.

The second position is relatively new and was first officially stated by Laurie Corbett and Mike J. Daniels. They represented the opinion that dingoes have changed and that it is not possible to bring the "pure" dingo back. Furthermore, historical definitions and the protective legislation based on them, have been rendered "obsolete" by anthropogenic environmental change. Thus interbreeding only means that the dingo today exists in a different form than its ancestors - some researchers now use the term evolving dingo. Protection for these dogs should be based on how and where they live, as well as on their cultural and ecological importance, instead of concentrating on precise definitions or concerns about genetic "purity". This approach was generally agreed to, but also hinted that it would be difficult to prove that a species shapes its environment. Essentially the genetic integrity of the dingo is already lost due to interbreeding; however, the importance of this phenomenon is disputable according to Corbett and Daniels, since the genes come from a domesticated version of the same species.

This view point is rejected (or, at least, controversially discussed) by those who want to preserve the "pure" dingo. Here, for instance, the molecular biologist Alan Wilton from the University of New South Wales argues that a maximizing of the "genetic purity" is an essential aspect of the dingo conservation. Dingo-hybrids would supposedly increase the predation on native species, because they would have more litters per year and therefore would have to raise more pups and some of them would be bigger than the average dingo. He also argued that it is, for instance, not sufficient to regard a wild dog with a little non-dingo-content as a "pure" dingo if it more or less acts the same way. Wilton was of the opinion that the scale had to be set higher when "pure" dingoes are available. Corbett and Daniels agreed that it is practical and desirable to minimize the effect of domestic dog genes. By this it would first be possible to find areas where the process is slower and to be able to limit it later; and second the populations would be able to develop accordingly to their natural environment. Furthermore, hybrids and other feral domestic dogs would probably not have the same tourist effect, because they don't correspond with the current expectations on wild dingoes.

To label this process, apart from the word interbreeding/hybridization, also terms like dilution of the dingoes or weakening of the genetic line are in usage. Even in the scientific area the process was called a sort of genetic pollution (itself a controversial term).

A demand for control of this process is based on the principle of caution and effective control measures are regarded as necessary. However this faces problems that are not negligible. To separate the "pure" dingo from other domestic dogs is difficult, if it is possible at all. The costs would be enormous, and even if all hybrids are destroyed, there are currently no methods to tests the dingoes in the field. Furthermore, control measures usually do not discriminate between dingoes and other domestic dogs. According to the biologist David Jenkins from the Australian National University there is little that can be done to reverse the process of interbreeding. Even if selectively searching for hybrids during the killings, it would only disrupt the pack structure and therefore affect the breeding rate of the dogs.

=== Possible changes in behaviour and biology ===
The exact effect of domestic dogs from human households on the social structure of free living dogs in Australia is not well documented. However, it is regarded as likely that the same factors that influence the social organization of dingoes in different areas also influence the social behaviour of other feral domestic dogs and dingo-hybrids.

The biology and ecology of dingo-hybrids has only been insufficiently researched, because most studies were limited on the topic of controlling these dogs. However, some changes in the wild dog population could be observed.

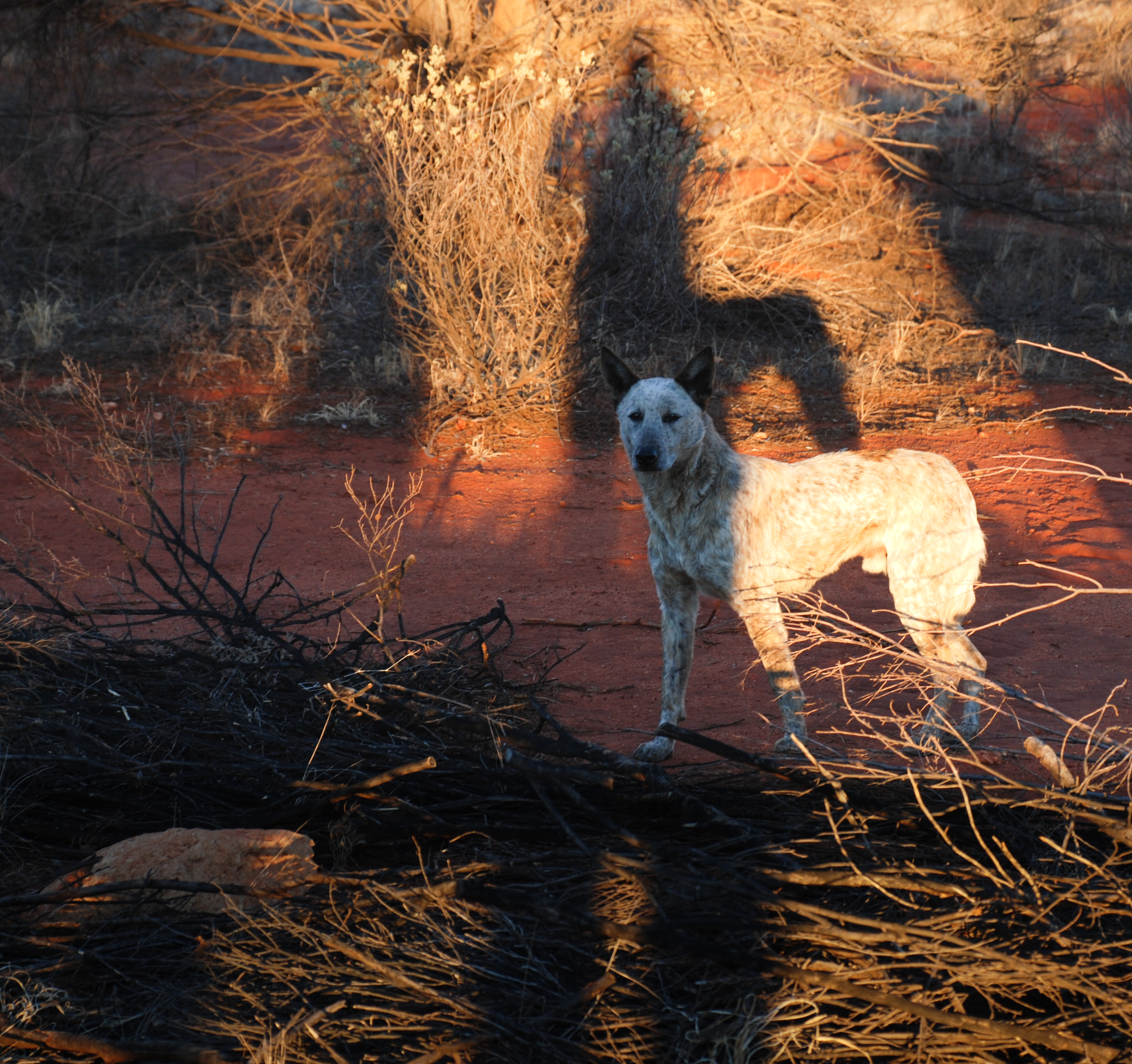
A dog at Uluru with visible characteristics of other dog-lines.

It is proven that there is a much wider range of fur colours, skull features and body sizes among the modern day wild dog population than in the times before the European colonization. Within Queensland for instance the different dog populations vary significantly, depending on the extent of interbreeding, while a bigger diversity of characteristics led to classification problems in Victoria and the term "wild dog" is now often used to label the current dog population. Evidence from south-eastern populations of Australian wild dogs indicates that the regular breeding rhythm of the dingo is interrupted, when a high number of dingo-hybrids and other domestic dogs, exists.

According to a five-year study of 2,000 wild dogs from all states of Australia by Ricky Spencer from the University of Western Sydney, some populations consist to 80% of dingo-hybrids and this enrichment of genes has provided a catalyst for the selection and micro-evolution of bigger wild dogs. Over the course of the last 40 years, there was an increase of the average wild dog body mass of about 20%, with 40% of the adult wild dogs in the Southeast of the continent now weighing more than 17 kg. This larger dog size has led to a higher efficiency with which wild dogs kill major prey and models indicate that a pack of wild dogs today requires almost a quarter more daily energy intake than an average pack of wild dogs prior to 1980. Furthermore, due to the high number of kangaroos and livestock, the wild dogs have been given the necessary environment to reach larger sizes.

On the topic of possible changes in behaviour, Ricky Spencer commented that it is not predictable how the interbreeding will affect the behaviour of the dingoes; he assumed that there could be potential problems since supposedly only dingoes are not accustomed to humans. According to David Jenkins, the claims stating that hybrids are bigger, more aggressive and a risk to public safety have so far not been supported by data and personal experience. He mentioned that there are reports of one or two unusually big dogs captured each year, but that most hybrids are close to what's considered to be the normal weight range of dingoes. In addition, Jenkins has encountered wild dingoes and hybrids and reported that "there's something really going on in that hard-wired brain", but also that the dogs "tend to be curious, rather than aggressive".

Most attacks of wild dogs on livestock are supposedly caused by dingo-hybrids and not "pure" dingoes, however the effect of wild dogs on the cattle industry is very variable, generally low (0-10% losses per year) and the majority of the much more susceptible sheep industry is located in the areas south of the Dingo fence, were the majority of the area has no stable wild dog populations and many of the remaining populations tend to have a high number of hybrids.

=== Ecological impact ===
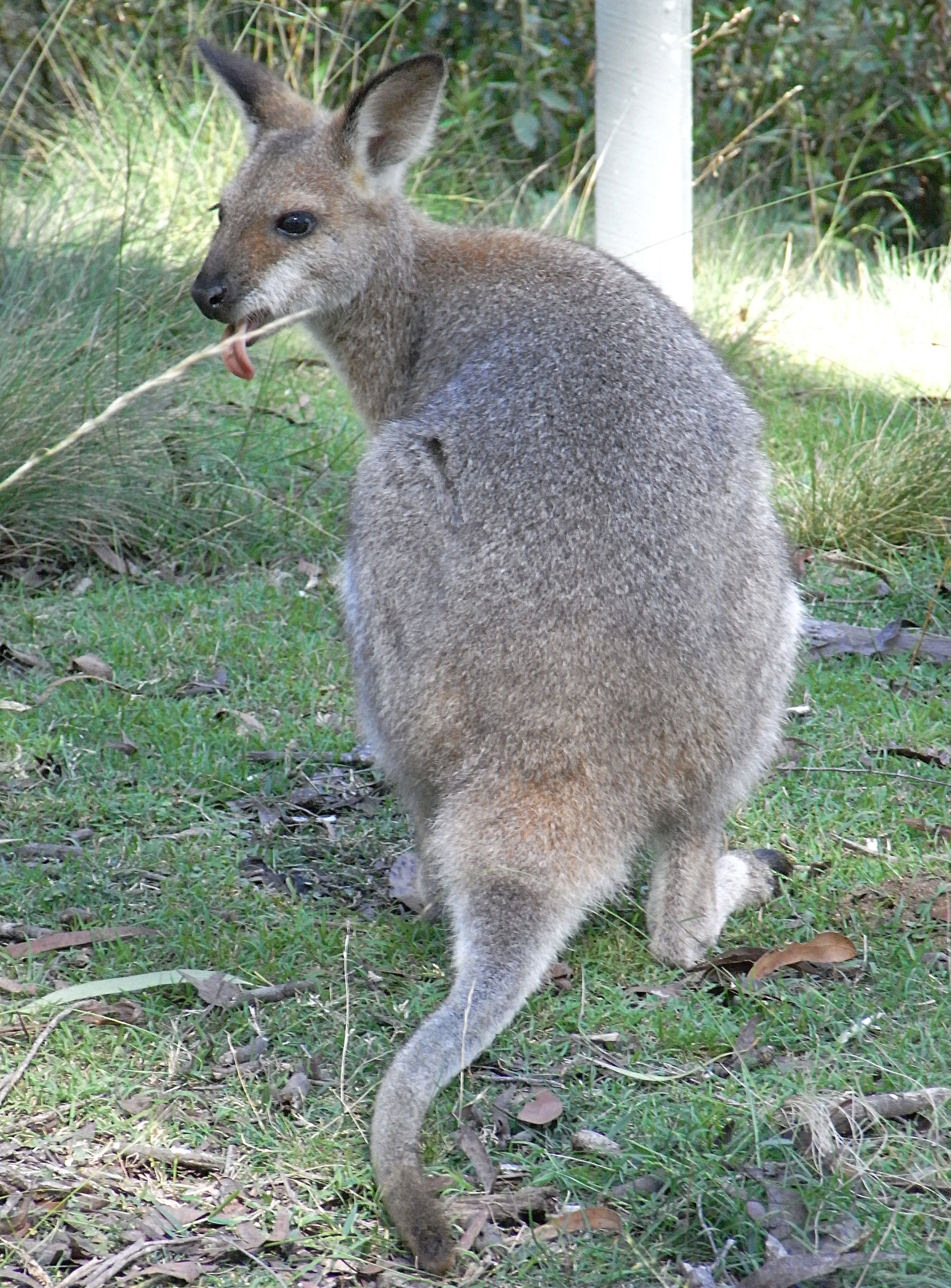
A red-necked wallaby, one of the animals proven to be prey for dingoes and dingo-hybrids

It is unknown if, in the case of the disappearance of the "pure" dingo, the then-existing hybrids will alter the predation pressure on other species. It is also not clear what kind of place these dogs will have in the Australian ecosystem and research results on this topic are rare. However, it is considered probable that the dynamics of the various ecosystems will not be disturbed by this. One example in this topic are the bush rats, where it is also seen as unlikely that there could be problems due to the dingo-hybrids, because these rodents had been exposed to the influence of the dingoes for thousands of years.

During studies on the efficacy of baits with 1080 (a deadly poison for canids) in the Kosciuszko national park in the middle of the 1980s, the local dogs (which were not classified as dingoes) have been observed with home ranges of similar sizes like dingoes from Southeast Australia. In addition these dogs also showed a preference for living prey, which lessened the efficacy of the baits. During studies in the Blue Mountains from March 2005 to April 2006 the main prey of the studied dogs consisted of red-necked wallabies, swamp wallabies, grey kangaroos, common wombats, common brushtail possums and European rabbits. The results indicated at a big hybrid population that exerted significant pressure on swamp wallabies and controlled outbreaks of the rabbit populations. According to David Jenkins, studies on wild dogs from the Kosciuszko National Park proofed that these dogs had about 75-80% content of dingo genes and filled in the role of the apex predator. Similar to "pure" dingoes, these hybrids hunted alone as well as in coordinated packs. The same ecological role was officially reported for the hybrids of the Namadgi-national park who filled the place of the apex predator and kept kangaroo numbers low.

== See also ==
- Canid hybrid
- Pariah dog
- Free-ranging dog
- Coydog
- Jackal-dog hybrid
- Wolfdog
- Dogxim

== Literature ==
- Lawrence K. Corbett: The Dingo in Australia and Asia. Cornell University Press, Ithaca, 1995, ISBN 0-8014-8264-X.
- Claudio Sillero-Zubiri, Michael Hoffmann and David W. Macdonald (editors): Canids: Foxes, Wolves, Jackals and Dogs. IUCN – The World Conservation Union, 2004
- Peter Fleming, Laurie Corbett, Robert Harden and Peter Thomson: Managing the Impacts of Dingoes and Other Wild Dogs. Bureau of Rural Sciences, Commonwealth of Australia, 2001
