= Brian Spooner (anthropologist) =

- Born: Newbury Park, Ilford, Essex, U.K.
- Education: Oxford University
- Scientific career
- Fields: Cultural Anthropology
- Website: www.globalizationstudies.upenn.edu

Brian J. Spooner is a British anthropologist. He is Professor of Anthropology, Undergraduate Chair at the Department of Anthropology at the University of Pennsylvania, and Curator of Near Eastern Ethnology at the Penn Museum. His works is in areas including cultural and social anthropology; globalization, Islam, Middle East, South Asia, Central Asia; social organization, religion, ethnohistory, ecology and non-industrial economies.

== Career ==
Spooner joined the faculty at University of Pennsylvania in 1968. He served as the Department of Anthropology's graduate chair 1985-8 and the University's Middle East Center Director from 1986-1995. He was Interim Co-Director of the Lauder Institute 2010 -2012, and is a Fellow at the Penn Institute of Urban Research and Affiliate Faculty at Penn's Graduate School of Education program on International Education Development. He has worked in Afghanistan, northwest China, Iran, India, Kazakhstan, Pakistan, Tajikistan, Turkmenistan, and Uzbekistan.

His current research focuses on social change under globalization.
