= The Stray Dog (short story) =

Short story by Sadegh Hedayat

- Short story by Sadegh Hedayat
- Country: Iran
- Language: Persian
- Genre(s): short story

Publication
- Published in: The Stray Dog
- Publisher: Bazargani Nejat
- Publication date: 1942

"The Stray Dog" (Persian: سگ ولگرد, Sag-e Velgard) is a short story by Iranian writer Sadegh Hedayat, first published in 1942 along with seven other short stories in the book of the same name.

== Plot summary ==
Pat is a Scottish breed dog with two intelligent human eyes. He misses his puppyhood, when he could drink his mother's milk without any difficulties. He used to play with his brother and with his master's son.

One day, Pat's master and two others got into an automobile, called Pat and put him beside them in the car. A few hours later they arrived at Varamin square and got out of the car. His master and the other two were passing the alley when Pat picked up a scent. This scent of a female canine brought him close to insanity. Pat followed the scent. When he came back he couldn't find his master.

From that day on, Pat's misfortunes began. The inhabitants of that place differed from his master in feeling and behavior. They beat Pat because of their religious believes and to please Allah. Pat's sufferings continued until a strange man came and gave him bread and yogurt. When the man's car moved, Pat started running after the car, despite the pain in his body.

The story ends when the barely alive dog lies on the side of the road, while three crows are waiting to eat his brown eyes.

== Critical reception ==
Jalal Al-e-Ahmad and Homa Katouzian have called "The Stray Dog" one of the best stories by Sadegh Hedayat.

== Sources ==
- "نقد سگ ولگرد، روان داستانی از صادق هدایت :: محمد علی همایون کاتوزیان". Nasour نصور (in Persian). 2015-12-12.
