= The Stray Dog (short story collection) =

1942 short story collection by Sadegh Hedayat

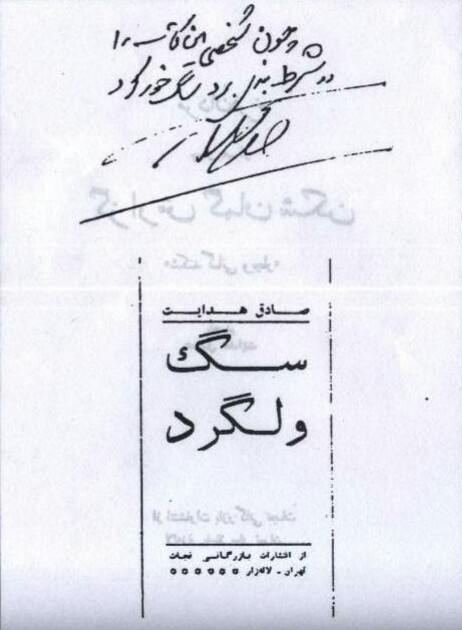
- First page of the 1942 edition with Hedayat's handwriting
- Author: Sadegh Hedayat
- Language: Persian
- Publication date: 1942
- Publication place: Iran

The Stray Dog (Persian: سگ ولگرد, Sag-e Velgard) is a 1942 short story collection by Iranian author Sadegh Hedayat.

== Publication history ==
The Stray Dog was first published by the Bazargani Nejat publication in Tehran in 1942. It consists of eight short stories and is Sadegh Hedayat's last short story collection. The exact writing time of these short stories is unknown today, however based on what Hadayat had written in his letters, it is believed that most of these short stories had been written before 1942. Before 1942, the censorship system of Reza Shah had prevented Hedayat from publishing. This obstacle was removed with the abdication of Reza Shah in 1941.

== Stories ==
- "The Stray Dog"
- "Don Juan of Karaj"
- "Dead End"
- "Katiya"
- "Abunasr Rock"
- "Apparition"
- "Dark Room"
- "The Patriot"

== Style ==
"The Stray Dog", "Dead End", and "Dark Room" are among those works by Hedayat that use realistic techniques in presenting a psycho-fictional story.

"Abunasr Rock" reflects Hedayat's interest both in ancient Iranian culture and in occult and spiritual phenomena. "The Patriot" can be categorized as a satirical fiction.
