= The Blind Owl =

1930s novella by Sadegh Hedayat

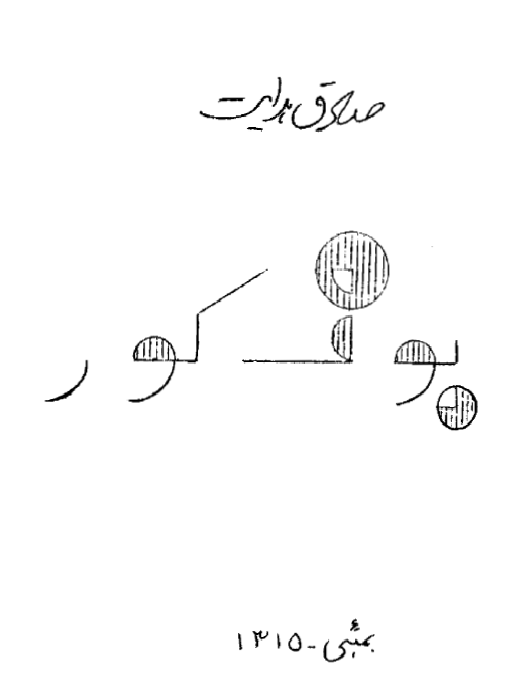
- Author: Sadegh Hedayat
- Original title: بوف کور
- Language: Persian
- Genre: Gothic
- Published: 1315 SH (1936 or 1937)
- Preceded by: The Songs of Khayyam
- Followed by: The Stray Dog

The Blind Owl (Persian: بوف کور, Būf-e Kūr) is a Persian novella by Sadegh Hedayat that is about an isolated, unnamed narrator who recounts his obsessive love for an enigmatic woman and his gradual descent into psychological fragmentation, conveyed through a dark, hallucinatory narrative in which reality, memory, and nightmare become indistinguishable. It was published in 1315 SH (1936 or 1937) and is considered to be Hedayat's magnum opus.

== Plot summary ==
In life there are certain sores that, like a canker, gnaw at the soul in solitude and diminish it.

— The beginning phrase of the book

A nameless pen-case painter lives in self-imposed exile outside Rayy, addicted to opium and wine to numb a festering spiritual sickness. He obsessively paints the same composition again and again: a stooped old man wrapped in a shawl under a cypress tree, receiving a lily from a girl in a black dress. The painter believes he is recording his story to understand himself before death, but his testimony is fractured by memory, hallucination, and horror.

One day the painted image bleeds into reality. Through an air vent he glimpses a living tableau: an ethereal girl in black bending toward a hideously laughing old man. The vision consumes him. When he looks again, the vent has sealed into solid wall. For two months and four days he searches the city in vain. On a foggy night the girl herself appears silently at his door, enters without a sound, lies on his bed, and dies. The painter shuts her eyes with his brush, then takes a bone-handled knife, dismembers her body, packs it into a suitcase, and hires a strange old hearse driver to carry him into the desert. He buries the suitcase by a dry riverbed. On the return journey the driver gives him a glazed jar painted with a face identical to the dead girl's. The painter recognizes a brother in affliction, an ancient fellow-sufferer. He returns home and burns his paintings and his opium, then collapses into a comatose trance. He wakes in what feels like a previous life, clothes stiff with blood, and begins writing his story for the only audience he has left: his shadow on the wall.

The narrative shifts into a second register, recounting his childhood and marriage. He grows up beside his cousin under the care of an aunt. He marries this cousin but calls her only "the whore." She refuses him physically and takes lover after lover, forcing him into the humiliation of befriending the men who sleep with her. He learns his mother was a temple dancer in India. His father and his identical twin brother both loved her. Their rivalry culminated in a trial by serpent, an ordeal that drove the surviving twin mad. The painter's body fails. Bedridden and nursed by his childhood nanny, he remembers a trip to the Suren River as a boy, where he saw a girl in black beneath a cypress tree, the very image that will later imprison his brush. The memory folds back into the present, where he prepares poisoned wine and waits for the night watchmen to come arrest him for murder.

In a further, hallucinatory layer, the painter describes his marriage to an ethereal woman he met once and now despises. Their union is loveless, unconsummated, poisoned by her affairs, most degradingly with a repulsive rag-and-bone dealer who stations himself outside the painter's window. His hatred curdles into a frightening decision: to kill his wife and then himself. He fixates on the bone-handled knife and on the butcher across the alley, whose methodical cutting becomes a model for the act he must commit. After several aborted attempts, he enters her room at night. She murmurs a phrase from their shared childhood, "Take off your scarf." He embraces her. Love and murder fuse in the dark. He drives the knife into her body. In the immediate aftermath he finds her eye resting in his palm. Staggering to a mirror, he sees he has physically transformed into the rag-and-bone dealer: white-haired, split-lipped, inhabited by something demonic. The story lurches again. He wakes at dawn in his room and watches a very old man, himself, exit the room carrying a wrapped jar and laughing hideously. Looking down at his own body, he discovers it covered in clotted blood and crawling with white worms.

== Development and publication ==
Sadegh Hedayat's The Blind Owl developed as a groundbreaking work in Persian literature, shaped significantly by his European education and exposure to Western literary traditions. It was the first Iranian novel to employ a modern, experimental form, introducing a rupture in the conventional literary history of Iran. Originally composed in apparently 1309 SH (1930 or 1931) in Tehran, the novella first appeared in photocopied form in 1315 SH (1936 or 1937) in Bombay because Hedayat anticipated that Iranian censors would prevent its publication, and he circulated it privately among close friends in Iran. Later that same year, it was published in Tehran and Cologne by respectively Jāvīdān and Ōfōgh publications in 87 pages, following the India print.

Hedayat wrote during Reza Shah's reign, when Iran was undergoing rapid modernization, including secularization, Western-style education, and the suppression of traditional religious practices, creating a cultural environment in which traditional Persian literary forms seemed insufficient for expressing new intellectual and psychological concerns. Influenced by European surrealism and narrative techniques, Hedayat chose the novel form rather than poetry or short prose to convey complex emotions, philosophical dilemmas, and social critiques, marking a decisive departure from established Persian literary conventions. His engagement with both Western and Eastern cultures, alongside the intellectual climate of early twentieth-century Iran, directly informed the innovative structure, style, and thematic depth of The Blind Owl, establishing it as a foundational work of modern Iranian literature.

== Critical reception ==
=== Praise ===
Sadegh Hedayat's The Blind Owl is nearly universally acknowledged as a foundational masterpiece of modern Iranian literature. Writing for The Georgetown Voice, Louisa Christen celebrates it as Hedayat's magnum opus, a "beautifully distressing" work of psycho-fiction whose potent surrealist symbolism and eerily simple language plunge the reader into an opium-haze spiral exploring existential angst, self-torture, and delirium. Christen sternly warns The Blind Owl is "not for the faint-hearted."

Sam Sacks of The Wall Street Journal claims Hedayat to be "the father of modernist Persian literature," an aristocratic exile whose phantasmal, tradition-disrupting horror represents a quintessential "minor classic" of enduring scholarly fascination.

In a personal essay for The Rumpus, Porochista Khakpour weaves her own forbidden fascination with the book into an analysis of its power, framing it not as a dangerous artifact but as a "triumph of art." She says that The Blind Owl is masterpiece of radical, hybridized aesthetics and ingenious cyclical structure whose creative exuberance is ultimately life-affirming, even as Khakpour concludes with her father's tactic by warning readers to "refrain... from reading this book, whatever you do."

On Literary Theory and Criticism, Nasrullah Mambrol provides a dense analytical review, arguing that beyond its surface resemblance to drug-fueled reverie, the novella is an intricate, syncretic narrative exercise whose recursive structure and persistent motifs coherently synthesize Eastern and Western philosophies into an original feat of modernist fiction, despite its ambiguous climax and audacious incorporation of passages from Rilke.

=== Criticism ===
Some reviewers have criticized the novel for its dark topic and abstract storyline. Kirkus Reviews delivers a starkly critical assessment, dismissing the novella as the "weird, feverishly introspective, obsessive, compulsive ravings and jottings of a madman," and while acknowledging its "strange compelling force," questions its audience, finding it an alienating and largely inaccessible journal of madness. Erin Clemence, reviewing for Mystery and Suspense, offers a nuanced endorsement, praising its beautiful, Steinbeckian language and deep symbolism while cautioning that its demanding, repetitious style and its graphic, unrelenting themes of decay and madness make for a psychologically arduous, though thought-provoking journey.

=== Comparisons to other authors ===
The Blind Owl and Hedayat have also been compared to numerous other gothic works and authors. David Wright in Library Journal ranks the dark, long-suppressed novella alongside the masterworks of Poe, Dostoyevsky, Kafka, and Pessoa, presenting it as an indelible existential nightmare certain to expand Hedayat's renown and notoriety.

For The Believer, Dalia Sofer reflects on Hedayat's enduring legacy as a foundational figure. She outlines the novella's tumultuous publication and its dense symbolism of isolation, suggesting this novella offers a timely chance to examine a work whose meditation on alienation resonates with the power of Kafka or Pessoa.

For Asymptote, Houman Barekat situates the novella within the cosmopolitan sprawl of modernism, delving into its "comprehensively obscene" nihilism and troubling political baggage while arguing it transcends its Iranian context to belong to a broader tradition of literary angst connecting Goethe to Huysmans.

=== Place in Iranian history ===
The Blind Owl's importance shows through its appearance in academic works about the history of Iran. Historian Abbas Amanat in Iran: A Modern History presents the book as Hedayat's masterpiece, portraying his multifaceted self through characters preoccupied with decay, death, and a mystical search for inner subjectivity. Unique in Persian modern literature and greatly influenced by Omar Khayyam's worldview, the book, written during the height of Reza Shah's "absolute power," represents a "dysfunctional member of the old elite" unable to find a place in the "superficial world of Pahlavi modernity."

In The New York Times, Amir-Hussein Radjy provides cultural context for the story. He compares Hedayat's posthumous elevation to "Iran's great literary modernist" to his tragic suicide, arguing that the author remains misunderstood. Radjy claims that even a clear, new translation could not settle the enduring puzzle of the grim, hurriedly published jeu d'esprit The Blind Owl, which has sustained wildly different interpretations as political allegory or personal testimony.
