= List of works by Frank Weston Benson =

Frank Weston Benson created a wide range of paintings, including portraits, landscapes, waterscapes, still lifes and murals.

He worked in oil paint, watercolor, etching and dry point. Over his career he made over six hundred watercolor paintings, like the landscape Camp that he made during a salmon fishing trip in Canada with his son, George.

Casting for Salmon is one of Benson's 359 etchings, most of which were made of waterfowl. In the simple composition of a fisherman reflected influence by Japanese artists and demonstrated his skill as an etcher. Salem Harbor was Benson's first etching, made while he was at the School of the Museum of Fine Arts, Boston and published in the school's magazine Students in the School of Drawing. Benson was one of the editors of the magazine. Thirty years later, in 1912, Benson began etching again, a practice that thereafter became a major body of his work. Two plates were made of The Anchorage that depicted a fisherman bringing a dory to shore. The first resulted in forty-eight proofs on shogun paper, forty-three of which were signed. The second plate was more spacious than the first and resulted in twenty-five signed proofs printed on shogun paper. The work was exhibited in 1915 and 1916 four times. Benson, a sportsman at heart, had a solid body of work of wildlife scenes and birds, generally waterfowl. His etchings span a number of genres, primarily waterscapes and wildlife. Benson, an avid bird-watcher and hunter from a young age, spent nearly every non-winter week-end hunting or fishing.

Benson declared Calm Morning of his three oldest children his "best out of door work." In this case Benson was deliberate in his approach, he made three oil studies before making the final painting; Generally he started and finished his outdoor paintings on one canvas. From left to right, Eleanor, Elisabeth and George fished over the side of a boat off in the waters of their summer home in Maine. Benson was masterful in capturing the reflection of the boat on the water and the deeper color of its shadow. The vivid, luminous colors give depict the sun shining upon the children.

== Works ==
- Interiors and still life
- Landscapes
- Murals
- Portraits
- Waterscapes
- Wildlife
- Other works

== Bibliography ==
- Bedford, F (2000). The sporting art of Frank W. Benson. Jaffrey, NH: David R. Godine. ISBN 1-56792-111-6.
- Benson, F.; Paff, A. (1917). Etchings and Drypoints by Frank W. Benson. Boston and New York: Houghton Mifflin Company.
- Benson, F.; Paff, A. (1919). Etchings and Drypoints by Frank W. Benson. Boston and New York: Houghton Mifflin Company.
- "Frank W. Benson, Collection". Boston Museum of Art.
- "Frank W. Benson, American Impressionist, Interactive presentation, Timeline". Peabody Essex Museum. Archived from the original on 2011-07-25.
