= List of portraits by Frank Weston Benson =

Portraits by Frank Weston Benson are portraits that Frank Weston Benson was commissioned to make or made of his family. He also made landscapes, wildlife, interiors and other works of art.

After his studies at the School of the Museum of Fine Arts, Boston and Académie Julian in Paris, Benson obtained commissions from judges, businessmen, and college presidents to paint portraits of themselves and their family members. In 1896 Benson began work on murals for the Library of Congress in Washington, D.C.: The Graces and The Four Seasons.

== Works ==
Benson was commissioned by distinguished New England families to paint portraits of family members. His own family members were favorite subjects.

Starting with Portrait of Margaret Washburn Walker Benson began receiving commissions from judges, college presidents, and businessmen to paint portraits of themselves and family members. He also painted portraits of friends and family. This portrait of Margaret Washburn Walker required twenty-six sittings.

Title	Image	Medium	Year	Collection	Comments and SIRIS ID (Note: The SIRIS Control Number is assigned for a given work of art in the Smithsonian Institution Research Information System. It can be used to search the SIRIS system and access the specific work of art.)
Sleeping Boy		oil on canvas	1879	Private collection	24 in x 20 in (61 cm x 50.8 cm) Sleeping Boy is a primitive painting of a boy who fell asleep at the dinner table, his hands resting on his arms. SIRIS Collection Number 72920296
Portrait of Henry Fitz Gilbert Waters		oil on canvas	1882	Private collection	8 in x 10 in (20.3 cm x 25.4 cm) The portrait was made of a man with a gray beard and moustache. SIRIS Collection Number 8A220034
Portrait of Joseph Lindon Smith		oil on canvas	1884	Private collection	25.5 in x 20.8 in (64.8 cm x 52.8 cm) Benson studied at the Académie Julian in Paris in 1883 and shared an apartment with fellow student, Joseph Lindon Smith. SIRIS Collection Number 89170053
My Sister (or Portrait of Betty)		oil on canvas	1885	Addison Gallery of American Art, Phillips Academy, Andover, MA	35.5 in x 29.5 in (90.2 cm x 74.9 cm) The painting was made of Elisabeth (Lizzie Betty) Benson at age 13. SIRIS Collection Number 20110005
Portrait of Margaret Washburn Walker		oil on canvas	1886	Private collection	43 in x 36.5 in (109.2 cm x 92.7 cm) SIRIS Collection Number 8A220001
Portrait of Charles Hamlin		oil on canvas	1887		28 in x 21.5 in (71.1 cm x 54.6 cm) Hamlin was an American lawyer and the first Chairman of the Federal Reserve System (1914–1916). SIRIS Collection Number 63007554
In Summer		oil on canvas	1887	Private collection	25 in x 21 in (63.5 cm x 53.3 cm) In Summer was made of Ellen Perry Peirson, artist's wife, the year before they were married. She is seated, facing left, with a landscape in the background. SIRIS Collection Number 89170010
Portrait in White (or Portrait of My Wife)		oil on canvas	1889	National Gallery of Art, Washington, DC	48.3 in x 38.3 in (122.7 cm x 97.3 cm) Having performed a conservation analysis, the National Gallery of Art found that Benson sketched the image of his wife onto the canvas, and painted the background dark green and her dress with a thick application, or impasto of white. Her skin was painted with yellow-tan paint and then over that a cool pink. Benson's daughter Sylvia owned the painting before it was bequeathed to the National Gallery of Art in 1977. SIRIS Collection Number 08600941
Girl in a Red Shawl		oil on canvas	1890		32.3 in x 32.3 in (82 cm x 82 cm) The painting is a portrait of girl seated facing left with right hand clasping red shawl at her chest. SIRIS Collection Number 80041929
Portrait of Alice Bacon		oil on canvas	1891		36 in x 29 in (91.4 cm x 73.7 cm), Alice Bacon was the wife of W. Sturgis H. Lothrop.
Twilight (or Twilight in the Desert)		oil on canvas	1891		39.5 in x 49.5 in (100.3 cm x 125.7 cm) Twilight features two female figures seated in an interior. The woman at right wears white dress, red shawl draped on back of sofa and the woman at center wears black dress. Glowing light shines at left near music stand/vase of white flowers. SIRIS Collection Number 89170099
Portrait of Alexander Pope		oil on canvas	1892		22.5 in x 19.3 in (57.2 cm x 49 cm) SIRIS Collection Number 89170056
Before the Ball (or Lamplight)		oil on canvas	1893		50 in x 40 in (127 cm x 101.6 cm) The painting is an interior scene with 2 women, one standing facing forward with one hand on her hip and the other resting on back of chair and the other woman is seated in background facing left with the fireplace at right. SIRIS Collection Number 71771497
Portrait of Emily Vanderbilt Binney		oil on canvas	1894		30 in x 25 in (76.2 cm x 63.5 cm)
Decorative Head, oil on canvas			1894	Museum of Fine Arts, Boston, Boston, MA	20 in x 24 in (50.8 cm x 61 cm) Decorative Head is a portrait of a woman wearing a kimono. SIRIS Collection Number 20490111
Portrait of Margaret White Richardson		oil on canvas laid down on board	1895		25 in x 30 in (63.5 cm x 76.2 cm) Margaret White Richardson, formerly Peirson, was the wife of Maurice Howe Richardson (1851–1912; m. 1879; Surgeon-in-Chief at Massachusetts General Hospital. SIRIS Collection Number 61511862
Portrait of Harold and Katherine Walker		oil on canvas	1895		25 in x 30 in (63.5 cm x 76.2 cm) The brother and sister, Harold D. Walker who was dressed in sailor suit and Katherine M. Walker was dressed in white are depicted in this painting. SIRIS Collection Number 89170068
Young Girl		oil on canvas	1895	Wichita Art Museum, Wichita, KS; Museum of Fine Arts, Boston, Boston, MA; Herbert F. Johnson Museum of Art, Cornell University, Ithaca, NY	23 in x 20 in (58.4 cm x 50.8 cm) SIRIS Collection Number 61511148
My Little Girl		oil on canvas	1895		44.5 in x 36 in (113 cm x 91.4 cm) 89170033 Benson's daughter, Eleanor, is the subject of the painting; She is seated with a cat beside her.
Portrait of a Boy (or My Little Boy)		oil on canvas	1896	Chrysler Museum of Art, Norfolk, VA	30 in x 26.5 in (76.2 cm x 67.3 cm) Portrait of a Boy provides evidence of Benson's study in Paris of the interplay and contrasts between light and dark. Benson's son, George, was the model for this painting. SIRIS Collection Number 55450169
Portrait of Amy Gordon Grant		oil on canvas	1896	Private collection	30 in x 25 in (76.2 cm x 63.5 cm)
Portrait of Judge Robert Grant		oil	1896		30 in x 25 in (76.2 cm x 63.5 cm) SIRIS Collection Number 8A220021
Seated Lady in White		oil	1896		30 in x 25 in (76.2 cm x 63.5 cm) SIRIS Collection Number 8A220038
Portrait of a Child Sewing		oil on canvas	1897	National Academy Museum, New York City	30.3 in x 24 in (77 cm x 61 cm) A young girl works intently on a small piece of blue cloth, with a doll on her lap in this work. SIRIS Collection Number 36270054
Portrait of Katherine Cavanaugh		oil on canvas	1897		30 in x 25 in (76.2 cm x 63.5 cm) SIRIS Collection Number 89170021
Self Portrait		oil on canvas	1898	National Gallery of Art, Washington, DC|National Academy Museum]] New York City	21 in x 17 in (53.3 cm x 43.2 cm) SIRIS Collection Number 36270053
Children in the Woods (or My Children in the Woods) (or In the Woods)		oil on canvas	1898	Private collection	40 in x 40.5 in (101.6 cm x 102.9 cm) Benson's two oldest children, Eleanor and George, are the subjects of this painting. Eleanor is dressed in white and George sits on the ground, dressed in a sailor suit. In 1889 Benson exhibited Children in the Woods at the "Ten American Painters" second exhibition; It was the first Impressionist oil painting that Benson exhibited. SIRIS Collection Number 61080016
Young Girl In Profile		oil on canvas	1898		20.3 in x 16 in (51.6 cm x 40.6 cm) A girl seated facing right wearing white dress with blue ribbon around her neck. SIRIS Collection Number 89170027
Child in Sunlight, Maine		oil on canvas	1899	Private collection	30 in x 24.1 in (76.2 cm x 61.2 cm) Sylvia, artist's daughter was painted en plein air, or in the open air, at the family's summer home near the sea. SIRIS Collection Number 62642249
Gertrude		oil on canvas	1899	Museum of Fine Arts, Boston, MA	50 in x 40 in (127 cm x 101.6 cm) Young Gertrude, wearing a white dress and seated in small white rocking chair is the subject of this work. SIRIS Collection Number 20490112
The Sisters		oil on canvas	1899	Terra Foundation for American Art, Chicago, IL	40 in x 39.5 in (101.6 cm x 100.3 cm) Painted at Benson's summer home, Sylvia, the toddler, has lost her bonnet and appears to have recently started walking. Her 6-year-old sister, Elisabeth, looks on. Benson skillfully captures the sunlight in the girl's clothing, the grass and sea. A breeze is suggested by Sylvia's billowing dress and the flying ribbon from the back of her dress. A successful painting for Benson, it won prestigious awards and appeared in exhibitions for two decades. SIRIS Collection Number 8A730034
Portrait of Marjorie Coldwell Westinghouse (or Portrait of Miss Westinghouse (or Young Girl in a White Dress)		oil on canvas	1899		44 in x 36 in (111.8 cm x 91.4 cm) SIRIS Collection Number 89170078
Portrait of a Woman		oil on canvas	1899		26 in x 22 in (66 cm x 55.9 cm)
Portrait of Mrs. Benjamin Thaw and Her Son		oil on canvas	1900		60 in x 39.5 in (152.4 cm x 100.3 cm) Mrs. Benjamin Thaw's son, Alexander Blair Thaw, III, was painted as a child with his mother. SIRIS Collection Number 89170059
Portrait of Elizabeth		oil on canvas	c. 1901		30 in x 24 in (76.2 cm x 61 cm) The artist's daughter, Elizabeth, was depicted standing on sunny hillside gazing down and holding straw hat. SIRIS Collection Number 89170100
Eleanor		oil on canvas	1901	Rhode Island School of Design Museum, Providence, RI	29.8 in x 25.2 in (75.7 cm x 64 cm) Benson's daughter, Eleanor, stands in a sunny landscape with right hand on hip and left hand shielding her eyes from sun. SIRIS Collection Number 47480053
Portrait of a Lady		oil on canvas	1901	Metropolitan Museum of Art, New York, NY	40.1 in x 32.4 in (101.9 cm x 82.3 cm) The seated woman wears a "Watteau style" dinner gown with low-cut neckline, snug bodice, and frilled half-length sleeves; Her outfit was accessorized with a dark hat and yellow/orange shawl. SIRIS Collection Number 36120281
Eleanor Holding a Shell (or Eleanor Holding a Shell, North Haven, Maine)		oil on canvas	1902	Private collection	30.3 in x 25 in (77 cm x 63.5 cm) Eleanor, Benson's daughter, is shown holding a large seashell against her body as she peers down at it. SIRIS Collection Number 89180003
Child with a Seashell		oil on canvas	1902		30 in x 25 in (76.2 cm x 63.5 cm) Eleanor Benson faces left holding large seashell close to face with both hands peering into it. SIRIS Collection Number 63001795
Portrait of Mary Sullivan		oil on canvas	1902		84 in x 54 in (213.4 cm x 137.2 cm) A full-length portrait of Sullivan was made with her left hand on her hip; she wears a velvet gown with deep V-neck and stands before oriental screen. SIRIS Collection Number 89170017
Sunlight		oil on canvas	1902		44 in x 36 in (111.8 cm x 91.4 cm) Sylvia, standing in garden near her mother's knees, she wears white dress and tights and has bow in her hair; her mother, the artist's wife is cut off, only part of her body and face are seen. A cat sits on her lap, her right arm is behind Sylvia's back. SIRIS Collection Number 89170062
Portrait of Two Little Girls (or Two Sisters)		oil on canvas	1903	Private collection	40 in x 32 in (101.6 cm x 81.3 cm) The painting is made of Benson's nieces, Rosamund and Ruth Benson, who are daughters of Benson's brother Harry. SIRIS Collection Number 89170065
The Hilltop		oil on canvas	1903	Malden Public Library, Malden, MA	71 in x 51 in (180.3 cm x 129.5 cm) Benson's children, Eleanor and George are painted with their dog on a hill. SIRIS Collection Number 21850010
Four Children at North Haven		oil on canvas	c. 1903		25 in x 30 in (63.5 cm x 76.2 cm) The coastal woodland scene depicts three girls and a boy playing on sun-dappled grass beneath evergreen trees. Two girls are in conversation on left; a boy and toy sailboat on right. A girl standing between others with right hand resting on tree branch. Sailboats are visible in background on ocean. SIRIS Collection Number 61070673
Study – Boy's Head	Online image	oil on canvas	1903		60.3 in x 23.8 in (153.2 cm x 60.5 cm) The artist's son, George, in profile sitting in grasses looks out to sea.
Portrait of Jane Shattuck		oil on canvas	1904	Peabody Essex Museum, Salem, MA	39.5 in x 31 in (100.3 cm x 78.7 cm) The subject Jane Shattuck, was later Mrs. Chase. SIRIS Collection Number 22620383
Lady Trying on a Hat (or The Black Hat)		oil on canvas	1904	Rhode Island School of Design Museum, Providence, RI	40.3 in x 32 in (102.4 cm x 81.3 cm) A seated woman holding a black hat slightly above her head. SIRIS Collection Number 47480077
Portrait of a Model-Mary Sullivan		oil pastel on paper	1904	Corcoran Gallery of Art, Washington, DC	26 in x 20.3 in (66 cm x 51.6 cm) SIRIS Collection Number 18830501
Mary Sullivan (or Woman Looking in a Mirror)		oil on canvas	1904		25 in x 20 in (63.5 cm x 50.8 cm) Sullivan is seen looking down into hand mirror in her right hand. SIRIS Collection Number 62410024
Eleanor in the Dory (or Study for Calm Morning)		oil on canvas	1904		20 in x 16 in (50.8 cm x 40.6 cm) Eleanor, wearing a white dress, is in rowboat dropping fishing line into water. She has a bow in her long, blond hair; her back is to viewer. SIRIS Collection Number 20490110
Children in Woods		oil on canvas	1905	Metropolitan Museum of Art, New York, NY; Museum of Fine Arts, Boston, Boston, MA; Herbert F. Johnson Museum of Art, Cornell University, Ithaca, NY	32 in x 30 in (81.3 cm x 76.2 cm) Children in the Woods (1905) depicts a forest scene of Benson's three daughters, Eleanor, Elisabeth and Sylvia who are all dressed in white. The girls are highlighted by sunlight through the trees. SIRIS Collection Number 36120869
Girl with Pink Bow		oil on canvas	1905	Pennsylvania Academy of the Fine Arts, Philadelphia, PA	30 in x 25 in (76.2 cm x 63.5 cm) The painting is of the artist's daughter Sylvia. SIRIS Collection Number 82190232
Girl with Pink Bow		oil on canvas	1905		20.4 in x 24.5 in (51.8 cm x 62.2 cm) SIRIS Collection Number 89170083
Philip Little, painter		oil on canvas	1906	Peabody Essex Museum; Salem, MA	30 in x 25 in (76.2 cm x 63.5 cm) SIRIS Collection Number 22620558
Portrait of Sue		oil on canvas	1906		63.3 in x 32.2 in (160.8 cm x 81.8 cm)
The Artist's Daughters or The Dining Room			1906	Private collection	
Rainy Day		oil on canvas	1906	Butler Institute of American Art, Youngstown, OH	25 in x 30 in (63.5 cm x 76.2 cm) Elisabeth, the artist's daughter, is curled up before a fireplace on a rainy day, reading a book. SIRIS Collection Number 42831491
Against the Sky		oil on canvas	1906		41 in x 34 in (104.1 cm x 86.4 cm) A woman wearing white dress and hat with sheer white veil is standing under cloudy blue sky and holding parasol open at her side. SIRIS Collection Number 60941039
Girls in the Garden		oil on canvas	c. 1906		30 in x 24.8 in (76.2 cm x 63 cm) Two girls are seated on grass; a standing woman standing, touching leaves on plant at left. SIRIS Collection Number 89170081
Summer Afternoon		oil on canvas	1906		30 in x 40 in (76.2 cm x 101.6 cm) Artist's daughters seated on grassy slope overlooking sea; Elisabeth, at left near dog, raises hand to shield eyes from sun; Eleanor, at right, holds parasol and turns head to look toward viewer; Sylvia, in center, plays with her ringlets; sailboats float in background. SIRIS Collection Number 68020155
Eleanor in the Pines		oil on canvas	1906		36 in x 26 in (91.4 cm x 66 cm) or 17 in x 24 in (43.2 cm x 61 cm) SIRIS Collection Number 89170069
Atherton Loring, Jr. (or Atherton Loring Jr. age 6 of Boston's Duxbury, Massachusetts)		oil on canvas	1906	Worcester Art Museum, Worcester, MA	40.3 in x 32 in (102.4 cm x 81.3 cm) The portrait was made of the boy at six years of age.
Eleanor		oil on canvas	1907	Museum of Fine Arts, Boston, MA	25 in x 30 in (63.5 cm x 76.2 cm) One of the most popular of Benson's paintings, Eleanor was purchased shortly after it was painted by the Museum of Fine Arts in Boston. The painting demonstrates Benson's adherence to French Impressionism by the use bright colors, depiction of light and fluid brushstroke of Eleanor's dress and deviation from French artists in the realistic definition of Eleanor's features with a small brush. SIRIS Collection Number 20490113
Portrait of Elizabeth Tyson Russell		oil on canvas	1907		30 in x 25 in (76.2 cm x 63.5 cm) Subject: Elizabeth Tyson Russell (as child).
Study for Portrait of My Daughters		pastel on paper	1907		19.1 in x 15.1 in (48.5 cm x 38.4 cm) SIRIS Collection Number 20110007
Portrait of My Daughters		oil on canvas	1907	Worcester Art Museum, Worcester, MA	26 in x 36.1 in (66 cm x 91.7 cm) Benson's three daughters (left to right) Elizabeth, Sylvia, and Eleanor are depicted at their summer home, Wooster Farm on New Haven Island, Maine. Like many of the portraits of his family, Benson made the painting en plein air, or outdoors, where he could best capture the effects of sunlight on the portrait. SIRIS Collection Number 23570020
Portrait of a Lady – Mary Kemble Webb Sanders		oil on canvas	1907		43.8 in x 36 in (111.3 cm x 91.4 cm) Mary was the wife of Nathaniel Sanders.
Portrait of Susie Sanders	Online image	oil on board	1907		43.5 in x 35.5 in (110.5 cm x 90.2 cm)
Portrait of Dorothy Lincoln		oil on canvas	1907		43.5 in x 35 in (110.5 cm x 88.9 cm) Dorothy Lincoln (1890–1909). SIRIS Collection Number 63005461
Portrait of Mrs. Hathaway		oil on canvas	1907	Peabody Essex Museum, Salem, MA	47.3 in x 37.3 in (120.1 cm x 94.7 cm) Mabel Hathaway, was the wife of Horatio Hathaway. SIRIS Collection Number 8A220004
Laddie		oil on canvas	1908	Farnsworth Art Museum, Rockland, ME	36.3 in x 30 in (92.2 cm x 76.2 cm) A child is shown wearing white and running through landscape with arms out to side. SIRIS Collection Number 18660031
Summer (or Hill-Top) (or Family Group) (or Girls on Hillside)		oil on canvas	1909	Smithsonian American Art Museum, Washington, DC	36.4 in x 44.4 in (92.5 cm x 112.8 cm) The painting features Benson's two daughters and their friends, Margaret Strong and Anna Hathaway. SIRIS Collection Number 47480082
Margaret 'Gretchen' Strong		oil on canvas	c. 1909	New Britain Museum of American Art, New Britain, CT	30.3 in x 25.3 in (77 cm x 64.3 cm) Margaret Strong, a 17-year-old neighbor and friend of Benson's daughters, is featured in the painting titled Summer made in 1909. Having seen the painting, Margaret's parents commissioned this portrait of their daughter. Margaret's profile, painted in shadow, is captured against the sea as she looks uphill toward Benson's daughters. Benson uses complementary, contrasting colors of blue in the sea and yellow in the grass and cooper-red hair that with his brisk brushstrokes bring an intensity to the work. SIRIS Collection Number 08601023
Sunlight (or Eleanor)		oil on canvas	1909	Indianapolis Museum of Art, Indianapolis, IN	32.3 in x 20 in (82 cm x 50.8 cm) Benson painted his daughter Eleanor looking across Penobscot Bay in Maine. Critic William Howe Downes, 1911 said of this painting: "[Benson] sets before us visions of the free life of the open air... in a landscape drenched in sweet sunlight." SIRIS Collection Number 13730016
Elizabeth		b/w reproduction	1909		
Portrait of a Lady (or Edith Perley Kinnicutt) (or Elizabeth Perley Kinnicutt)		oil on canvas	1909	Worcester Art Museum, Worcester, MA	50 in x 40.1 in (127 cm x 101.9 cm) Edith Perley (1856–1923) was the wife of Lincoln Kinnicutt. SIRIS Collection Number 80046146
Girl Playing Solitaire (or Solitaire)		oil on canvas	1909	Worcester Art Museum, Worcester, MA	50.5 in x 40.5 in (128.3 cm x 102.9 cm) The painting is an interior scene with a female figure playing solitaire. SIRIS Collection Number SIRIS Collection Number 23570019
Elizabeth and Anna (or In Summer)		oil on canvas	1909		32 in x 25 in (81.3 cm x 63.5 cm) The artist's daughter and her friend, Anna Hathaway, are seated on grassy hill; both girls wearing white dresses with bows in their hairs. Elisabeth, at left, holds white flowers in her raised hand; Anna sits with hands clasped on her knee. Penobscot Bay is below, at right. SIRIS Collection Number 26030095
The Reader		oil on canvas	1910		25 in x 30 in (63.5 cm x 76.2 cm) A female figure is seated on ground in backyard setting holding a book in her lap and an open parasol at her side. SIRIS Collection Number 68250015
Portrait of Margaret L. Fuller		oil on canvas	1910	Currier Museum of Art, Manchester, NH	34 in x 30 in (86.4 cm x 76.2 cm) Margaret L. French was a lifelong resident of Manchester, NH. Her portrait was commissioned at the time of her engagement in 1909.
Woman by Geraniums (or Woman with Geraniums)		oil on canvas	c. 1910	Private collection	28 in x 22 in (71.1 cm x 55.9 cm) A woman seated in landscape near bush of red geraniums in the foreground; she is wearing white dress with head slightly bowed. SIRIS Collection Number 80280001
Summer Day		oil on canvas	1911	Crystal Bridges Museum, Bentonville, AR	36.1 in x 32.1 in (91.7 cm x 81.5 cm) A sunny outdoor scene with artist's daughters (Elisabeth at 18; Sylvia at 13) casting their eyes toward high horizon line where boundary between sea and sky nearly dissolves; watching sailboat race in North Haven, ME. SIRIS Collection Number 81530028
Young Girl by a Window (or Woman near Window (or Maid in Waiting)		oil on canvas	1911	Harvard Art Museums, Cambridge, MA	30.5 in x 25.4 in (77.5 cm x 64.5 cm) Subject: artist's daughter, Eleanor. SIRIS Collection Number 10420046
Sunshine and Shadow		oil on canvas	c. 1911	Private collection	30.3 in x 25.3 in (77 cm x 64.3 cm) Benson's daughters Eleanor and Elisabeth are depicted in the painting Sunshine and Shadow. He intended to keep the painting for himself but gave in to persistent requests by a collector who purchased the painting. SIRIS Collection Number 8A220006, 73530017
Sunlight and Shadow		oil on canvas	1911		44 in x 36 in (111.8 cm x 91.4 cm) Daughters Eleanor and Elisabeth are seated outdoors in shade of tree; a hat rests on the grass beside bench. SIRIS Collection Number 60630335
Study for Young Girl with a Veil		oil on canvas	c. 1912	Private collection	30 in x 24.8 in (76.2 cm x 63 cm) Eleanor, Benson's oldest daughter, sat for this painting. Originally the painting was displayed in Benson's home and then bequeathed to her. Its location is now unknown. SIRIS Collection Number 8A220005
My Daughter		oil on canvas	1912	Crystal Bridges Museum of American Art, Bentonville, AR	30.3 in x 25.3 in (77 cm x 64.3 cm) Sylvia is portrayed in this waist-length portrait, wearing a wide-brimmed hat. SIRIS Collection Number 08260330
Eleanor on the Hilltop		oil on canvas	1912		33.5 in x 56.5 in (85.1 cm x 143.5 cm) Daughter Eleanor, wearing a white dress, is standing on hilltop, and looking out to sea; she shields her eyes from sun with her left hand. SIRIS Collection Number 89170077
Portrait of a Young Woman		mixed media painting	1912		51 in x 29 in (129.5 cm x 73.7 cm) SIRIS Collection Number 89170111
Head of an Old Man		etching on copper plate/print	1912	Cleveland Museum of Art, Cleveland, OH	
Afternoon in September		oil on canvas	1913	Memorial Art Gallery, University of Rochester, Rochester, NY	25.3 in x 30.3 in (64.3 cm x 77 cm) Afternoon in September is a painting of two of Benson's daughters. SIRIS Collection Number 02960169
Portrait of Elisabeth (or Elisabeth)		oil on canvas	c. 1913		29.4 in x 24.3 in (74.7 cm x 61.7 cm) Elisabeth, standing with hands on her hips and her body faces forward but head and eyes are turned to right. She wears an Oriental jacket over a ruffled blouse. SIRIS Collection Number 89170096
Portrait of Jane dePeyster Webster		oil on canvas	1913		44 in x 36 in (111.8 cm x 91.4 cm) Webster was an eminent figure in Boston society at the turn of the 20th century and wife of Edwin Webster Sr. (m. 1893), a wealthy entrepreneur with electrical engineering and financial interests. The portrait was painted in 1913, shortly after the Websters purchased a grand townhouse in Boston (306 Chestnut Street) where this artwork was featured.
Mother and Child		drypoint etching	1913	Brooklyn Museum, Brooklyn, NY; Museum of Fine Arts, Boston, MA; Mead Art Museum, Amherst College, Amherst, MA	11.6 in x 9 in (29.5 cm x 22.9 cm) or 7.2 in x 5.9 in (18.3 cm x 15 cm)
Profile Head		etching on laid paper	1914	Brooklyn Museum, Brooklyn, NY	12.7 in x 10.1 in (32.3 cm x 25.7 cm)
Head		drypoint etching/print	1914	Westmoreland Museum of American Art, Greensburg, PA	9.8 in x 8 in (24.9 cm x 20.3 cm)
The Hill Top		oil on canvas	1914		40 in x 32 in (101.6 cm x 81.3 cm) Elisabeth, standing on grassy hill, holds a closed parasol with her left hand and the brim of her hat with right hand. SIRIS Collection Number 8A220037
Portrait of Mary Spencer Fuller		oil on canvas	1914	Currier Museum of Art, Manchester, NH	36 in x 30 in (91.4 cm x 76.2 cm) Fuller was the daughter of Margaret L. Fuller. Here she is a rosy-cheeked young girl with red hair and blue eyes wearing crisp white dress, sitting in a small chair, and clasping doll in her lap.
My Daughter Elizabeth		oil on canvas	c. 1915	Detroit Institute of Arts, Detroit, MI	44 in x 37 in (111.8 cm x 94 cm) The painting depicts a relaxed, graceful young woman with her back to the sea. In it, Benson demonstrated his skill at composition. Diagonals were used to create movement, with Elisabeth as the focal point. It is another great example of Benson's skill at managing light and dark colors. SIRIS Collection Number 24150063
Eleanor and Benny (or Mother and Child)		oil on canvas	1915	Private collection	25 in x 30 in (63.5 cm x 76.2 cm) Benson's daughter Eleanor, wife of Ralph Lawson, is shown with her young son Frank Benson Lawson. SIRIS Collection Number 89170080
Red and Gold		oil on canvas	1915	Butler Institute of American Art, Youngstown, OH	31 in x 39 in (78.7 cm x 99.1 cm) Benson chose subjects that celebrated a civilized "ideal of grace, of dignity, of elegance", like the young woman in Red and Gold. Against a black and gold Japanese art screen, her white dress and bright red shawl gain our attention.
Nan		drypoint etching/print	1915	Cleveland Museum of Art, Cleveland, OH; Museum of Fine Arts, Boston, Boston, MA; Frye Art Museum, Seattle, WA; Herbert F. Johnson Museum of Art, Cornell University, Ithaca, NY	9.9 in x 8 in (25.1 cm x 20.3 cm) or 11.6 in x 9.1 in (29.5 cm x 23.1 cm) Nan was a drypoint printed on thick Japanese vellum. His daughter Elizabeth was either the subject of the work – or worked with her father on the drypoint.
Portrait of Gertrude Russell		oil on canvas	1915		54.3 in x 42 in (137.9 cm x 106.7 cm) Gertrude Russell, painted at age 11, was the granddaughter of U.S. Representative William A. Russell.
Eleanor and Benny (or Mother and Child		oil on canvas	1916	Private collection	36 in x 44 in (91.4 cm x 111.8 cm) Eleanor Benson, wife of Ralph Lawson, is shown with her son Frank. SIRIS Collection Number 80040956
Portrait of Natalie (or Natalie)		oil on canvas	1917	Worcester Art Museum, Worcester, MA	30 in x 25 in (76.2 cm x 63.5 cm) Natalie appears in bright sunshine with deep blue sky in the background. She wears a brown hat trimmed with green ribbon, beige skirt, white blouse and a red and black scarf draped around shoulders. SIRIS Collection Number 23570619
The Open Window		oil on canvas	1917	Corcoran Gallery of Art, Washington, DC	52.1 in x 42.4 in (132.3 cm x 107.7 cm) Daughter Elisabeth is seated in center of sparsely furnished room, knitting held in her hands, lit by two open windows framed by louvered shutters. SIRIS Collection Number 89170079
Mrs. Henry Harrison Proctor with Barbara & Frances		oil	1917		SIRIS Collection Number 9A470006
Portrait of Philip Moen Childs		oil on canvas	1918	Wichita Art Museum, Wichita, KS	44 in x 36 in (111.8 cm x 91.4 cm) SIRIS Collection Number 45130183
Elizabeth		etching on wove paper/print	1918	Brooklyn Museum, Brooklyn, NY; Cleveland Museum of Art, Cleveland, OH; Museum of Fine Arts, Boston, MA	13.9 in x 11 in (35.3 cm x 27.9 cm)
Boy in Blue		oil on canvas	1918		40 in x 32 in (101.6 cm x 81.3 cm) or 30 in x 25 in (76.2 cm x 63.5 cm) SIRIS Collection Numbers 61071761, 8A730020, 89170030
Portrait of Doctor Hugh Williams		drypoint etching/print	1918	Cleveland Museum of Art, Cleveland, OH	8 in x 5.9 in (20.3 cm x 15 cm)
Portrait of Augustus Hemenway		drypoint etching on laid paper/print	1919	Cleveland Museum of Art, Cleveland, OH; Museum of Fine Arts, Boston, MA	9 in x 7 in (22.9 cm x 17.8 cm) Hemenway (1853–1931) was a Bostonian philanthropist and public servant. Benson made eight trial proofs of the portrait of Augustus Hemenway. The published images were made on fine Japanese Shogun and Kochi paper.
The Sunny Window		oil on canvas	1919		30 in x 25 in (76.2 cm x 63.5 cm) Eleanor is seated facing right with her head bowed over her sewing. Sunlight enters room from window which occupies most of upper third of painting. SIRIS Collection Number 08582618
Colonel Bolling		drypoint etching/print	c. 1919	Cleveland Museum of Art, Cleveland, OH; Brooklyn Museum, Brooklyn, NY	
Portrait of Charles Martin Loeffler		etching on laid paper/print	1919	Museum of Fine Arts, Boston, MA	9.9 in x 7.9 in (25.1 cm x 20.1 cm) Loeffler (1861–1935) was a French-born American violinist and composer.
Nascaupée Native American		drypoint etching on laid paper/print	1921	Museum of Art, University of New Hampshire, Durham, NH; Museum of Fine Arts, Boston, MA; Art Institute of Chicago, Chicago, IL	7.8 in x 5.9 in (19.8 cm x 15 cm)
Reflections (or Girl with Mirror)		oil on canvas	1921	Private collection	43.8 in x 36 in (111.3 cm x 91.4 cm) Reflections, a skillful execution of indoor lighting, is Benson's last-known interior. He made it of his daughter Elisabeth who is depicted in a reflective mood. The painting is interesting compositionally, Elisabeth sat in a mandarin coat in a skillfully arranged placement of supporting objects. SIRIS Collection Number 61200167
The Watcher		oil on canvas	1921	Indianapolis Museum of Art, Indianapolis, IN	30 in x 25 in (76.2 cm x 63.5 cm) Daughter Sylvia stands with left hand shielding her eyes from sun as she looks out across water with a sailboat at sea beyond her. SIRIS Collection Number 56980097
Metcalf Sketching		pencil	1921	Butler Institute of American Art, Youngstown, OH	10 in x 8.5 in (25.4 cm x 21.6 cm)
Portrait of Willard Metcalf		watercolor	c. 1921	Colby College Museum of Art, Waterville, ME	20 in x 14 in (50.8 cm x 35.6 cm) In the painting Metcalf paints a watercolor which he holds in his lap while sitting on edge of river. He is wearing a hat and red bandana. SIRIS Collection Number 18830149
Portrait of Mr. Malloch		drypoint etching/print	1921	Cleveland Museum of Art, Cleveland, OH	
Portrait of Mrs. Malloch		drypoint etching/print	1921	Cleveland Museum of Art, Cleveland, OH	
Portrait of a Man (or Study in Shadows)		oil on canvas	1922	Frye Art Museum, Seattle, WA	30 in x 24.5 in (76.2 cm x 62.2 cm) The subject is Parker R. Stone. SIRIS Collection Numbers 18660575, 89170034
Portrait of a Man	Online image	drypoint etching on wove paper/print	1923	Cleveland Museum of Art, Cleveland, OH; Frye Art Museum, Seattle, WA	7.9 in x 6 in (20.1 cm x 15.2 cm) or 12.6 in x 9.8 in (32 cm x 24.9 cm) Artwork is indicated "To Fred Saunderson".
Portrait of Arthur Tracy Cabot	Online image	drypoint etching on wove paper/print	1923	Cleveland Museum of Art, Cleveland, OH; Museum of Fine Arts, Boston, MA	9.9 in x 8 in (25.1 cm x 20.3 cm) The subject is Dr. Arthur T. Cabot.
Old Tom		watercolor on paper	1923	Museum of Fine Arts, Boston, MA	20.1 in x 14.1 in (51.1 cm x 35.8 cm) Old Tom, the caretaker of Benson's hunting cabin, inspired this painting and an etching with the same title.
Portrait of Richard Saltonstall	Online image	oil on canvas	1924	Pennsylvania Academy of the Fine Arts, Philadelphia, PA	36 in x 44 in (91.4 cm x 111.8 cm) Benson made this portrait of his friend, an attorney, two years after he died. By 1924 he had essentially given up accepting portrait commissions, so it was likely the friendship with Mr. Saltonstall that inspired him to create this work. SIRIS Collection Number 22661443
Portrait of Richard Cockburn Maclaurin	Online image	oil on canvas	1925	MIT Museum, Massachusetts Institute of Technology, Cambridge, MA	40 in x 55 in (101.6 cm x 139.7 cm) Maclaurin was the president of Massachusetts Institute of Technology (MIT) 1909–1920.
Old Tom		etching/print	1926		14 in x 9 in (35.6 cm x 22.9 cm) Old Tom was the caretaker of Benson's hunting cabin.
Two Boys	Online image	oil on canvas	1926	Metropolitan Museum of Art, New York, NY	32.4 in x 40.1 in (82.3 cm x 101.9 cm) The artist's grandsons, Frank and Ralph Lawson, are shown with a dog in tall grassy landscape at Wooster Farm in North Haven. SIRIS Collection Number 36120282
Portrait of Elihu Thomson	Online image	oil on canvas	1937	MIT Museum, Massachusetts Institute of Technology, Cambridge, MA	36.3 in x 44 in (92.2 cm x 111.8 cm) Thomson (1853–1937) was the acting president of MIT from 1920 to 1923.
Leverett Saltonstall, Jr.		oil			SIRIS Collection Number 82400101
Arrivederci	Online image	oil			35.4 in x 46.9 in (89.9 cm x 119.1 cm) A girl looks out to sea waving handkerchief.
Portrait of Mrs. Abbott	Online image	oil on canvas			41.3 in x 33 in (104.9 cm x 83.8 cm)
Seated Figure (or Woman in White)	Online image	oil on canvas			30 in x 25 in (76.2 cm x 63.5 cm) Seated Figure is a half-length portrait of a woman seated facing left with hands folded in her lap; she wears a white dress. SIRIS Collection Number 71500865
Yound Man on a Roan Horse in the Mountains	Online image	watercolor on board			

== Bibliography ==
- Bedford, F. "Benson Biography 2". Faith Andrews Bedford. Archived from the original on 2012-03-25.
- Bedford, F (2000). The sporting art of Frank W. Benson. Jaffrey, NH: David R. Godine. ISBN 1-56792-111-6.
- Benson, F.; Paff, A. (1917). Etchings and Drypoints by Frank W. Benson. Boston and New York: Houghton Mifflin Company.
- Benson, F.; Paff, A. (1919). Etchings and Drypoints by Frank W. Benson. Boston and New York: Houghton Mifflin Company.
- Chambers, B. "Frank W. Benson, Red and Gold". Butler Institute of American Art. Archived from the original on 2011-09-27.
- "Frank W. Benson, American Impressionist, Exhibition". Peabody Essex Museum. Archived from the original on 2011-07-25.
- "Frank W. Benson, American Impressionist, Interactive presentation, Gallery". Peabody Essex Museum. Archived from the original on 2011-07-25.
- "Frank W. Benson, American Impressionist, Interactive presentation, Timeline". Peabody Essex Museum. Archived from the original on 2011-07-25.
- "Frank W. Benson, Collection". Boston Museum of Art.
- "Frank W. Benson, Collection". Cleveland Museum of Art, Ohio.
- "Frank W. Benson, Collection". National of Art, Washington D.C.
- "Frank W. Benson, Collection". University of New Hampshire.
- "Frank Weston Benson, Collection". Art Institute of Chicago.
- "Portrait of My Daughters". Worcester Art Museum.
- The Sisters, Terra Foundation for American Art
- "Summer". Rhode Island School of Design Museum. Archived from the original on 2011-06-10.
- "Smithsonian Institution Research Information System (SIRIS)". Smithsonian Institution.
- "Sunlight". Indianapolis Museum of Art.
