= List of other works of art by Frank Weston Benson =

Frank Weston Benson made portraits, landscapes, seascapes, murals, and paintings of interiors and still life. He also made other works of art including etchings.

While Benson studied at the Académie Julian in Paris, he made the small Impressionistic oil painting, Paris Parade. Benson stayed the summer at the Grand Hotel in Concarneau, France where he became engaged to the daughter of friends from Salem, Massachusetts, Ellen Perry Peirson. They married three years later, after Benson had an opportunity to establish himself in his career.

== Works ==
Title	Image	Year	Dimensions	SIRIS IAP (Note: The SIRIS IAP is the Control Number for a given painting at the Smithsonian Institution Research Information System. Using this link, you may look up the painting using the IAP number for the "Control number".)	Collection	Comments
Paris Parade, oil on canvas		1884	12.5 in × 7.6 in (31.8 cm × 19.3 cm)	89170009	Private collection	
Summer, oil on canvas		1890	50 in × 40 in (127 cm × 101.6 cm)	08580165	Smithsonian American Art Museum, Washington, DC	Allegory
My Pointer, etching/print	view	1915	5.9 in × 7.9 in (15 cm × 20.1 cm)		Museum of Fine Arts, Boston, Boston, MA	Scene: hunting dog (likely Pointer).
The Log Jam, etching/print	view	1915	9.9 in × 7.9 in (25.1 cm × 20.1 cm)		Museum of Fine Arts, Boston, Boston, MA	
Birch Canoe, etching/print		1915			Museum of Fine Arts, Boston, Boston, MA	
The Moose Caller, etching/print		1915			Museum of Fine Arts, Boston, Boston, MA	
Hurry, drypoint etching on copper plate/print		1915			Cleveland Museum of Art, Cleveland, OH; Museum of Fine Arts, Boston, Boston, MA	
The Retriever, etching/print	view	1916	8 in × 6 in (20.3 cm × 15.2 cm)		Cleveland Museum of Art, Cleveland, OH; Museum of Fine Arts, Boston, Boston, MA; Herbert F. Johnson Museum of Art, Cornell University, Ithaca, NY	Scene: retriever.
Silhouette, etching/print		1917			Museum of Fine Arts, Boston, Boston, MA	
Hunters, etching/print	view	1919	6 in × 7.9 in (15.2 cm × 20.1 cm)		Museum of Fine Arts, Boston, Boston, MA	
Seal, Peabody Museum. Salem, etching/print	view	1919	9.9 in × 7.9 in (25.1 cm × 20.1 cm)		Museum of Fine Arts, Boston, Boston, MA; Mead Art Museum, Amherst College, Amherst, MA	
Seal, Essex County Ornithological Club, etching/print	view	1919	8.9 in × 6.9 in (22.6 cm × 17.5 cm)		Museum of Fine Arts, Boston, Boston, MA; Mead Art Museum, Amherst College, Amherst, MA	
Supper, etching on wove paper/print	view	1920	12.5 in × 9.5 in (31.8 cm × 24.1 cm) or 7 in × 5 in (17.8 cm × 12.7 cm)		Museum of Fine Arts, Boston, Boston, MA; Frye Art Museum, Seattle, WA; Herbert F. Johnson Museum of Art, Cornell University, Ithaca, NY	
A Cup of Water, etching/print	view	1920	6.8 in × 4.9 in (17.3 cm × 12.4 cm)		California Palace of the Legion of Honor, San Francisco, CA; Museum of Fine Arts, Boston, Boston, MA	Scene: male figure crouching to dip water.
Camp-fire, etching/print		1920			Museum of Fine Arts, Boston, Boston, MA	
The Guide, drypoint etching/print	view	1920	6.9 in × 10.9 in (17.5 cm × 27.7 cm)		Museum of Fine Arts, Boston, Boston, MA; Herbert F. Johnson Museum of Art, Cornell University, Ithaca, NY	Scene: lone male figure standing in water holding gaff.
Henry's Tent, North Haven, Maine, watercolor on paper	color image	1921	13.5 in × 19 in (34.3 cm × 48.3 cm)			
Boiling the Kettle, watercolor over graphite on ivory paper	color image	1923	14.8 in × 21.9 in (37.6 cm × 55.6 cm)	89170037	Art Institute of Chicago, Chicago, IL	Scene: male figure crouching near campfire where kettle boils.
Plodding Home, etching/print	search collection	1924	7.2 in × 5.1 in (18.3 cm × 13 cm)		Achenbach Foundation for Graphic Arts, California Palace of the Legion of Honor, San Francisco, CA; Museum of Fine Arts, Boston, Boston, MA	
Log Driver, drypoint etching on copper plate/print	view	1924	12.1 in × 14.1 in (30.7 cm × 35.8 cm) or 9.9 in × 11.9 in (25.1 cm × 30.2 cm)		Cleveland Museum of Art, Cleveland, OH; Museum of Fine Arts, Boston, Boston, MA; Mead Art Museum, Amherst College, Amherst, MA; Herbert F. Johnson Museum of Art, Cornell University, Ithaca, NY	
The Camp, oil on canvas	color image	1925	22 in × 28 in (55.9 cm × 71.1 cm)	63007559	Private collection	
Man with a Gaff, drypoint etching on copper plate/print	view	1925	11.8 in × 9.8 in (30 cm × 24.9 cm)		Museum of Fine Arts, Boston, Boston, MA; Mead Art Museum, Amherst College, Amherst, MA	Subject: Canadian guide.
Pointer Dog, etching on laid paper/print	view	1925	9.3 in × 11.4 in (23.6 cm × 29 cm) or 5.9 in × 7.8 in (15 cm × 19.8 cm)		Museum of Fine Arts, Boston, Boston, MA; Frye Art Museum, Seattle, WA	Scene: Pointer.
Two Duck Hunters, watercolor	color image color image	1926	20 in × 25 in (50.8 cm × 63.5 cm)			Scene: two waterfowl hunters wading through marsh.
The Start (or Getting Underway), watercolor on paper	color image	1927	25 in × 19.5 in (63.5 cm × 49.5 cm)			
Three Cranks 1 a.m., watercolor on paper (en grisaille)	view		8.3 in × 10.8 in (21.1 cm × 27.4 cm)			Scene: three figures fishing in a nighttime cityscape.
Book-plate/Frontispiece: Pair of Geese, etching on laid paper/print	view	1919	4 in × 6 in (10.2 cm × 15.2 cm)			Scene: Canada geese.
Book-plate/Frontispiece: On Set Wings, etching on laid paper/print	view	1923	4.3 in × 5.7 in (10.9 cm × 14.5 cm)			Scene: wildfowl in flight.
Book-plate/Frontispiece: Startled Ducks etching on laid paper/print	view	1930	7.9 in × 5.9 in (20.1 cm × 15 cm)			Scene: wildfowl in waterscape.
'Book-plate/Frontispiece: Untitled (for Quincy A. Shaw, Jr.) etching/print	view	1938	4 in × 3 in (10.2 cm × 7.6 cm)			Scene: single wildfowl in waterscape.
Book-plate: Charles Martin Loeffler, etching/print					Museum of Fine Arts, Boston, Boston, MA	Charles Martin Loeffler (1861–1935), French-born American violinist and composer.
Book-plate: Bessie Ingalls Hussey, drypoint etching/print	view		6.9 in × 4.9 in (17.5 cm × 12.4 cm)			
Book-plate: The Retriever (for Henry Boardman Conover), etching/print	view		5.5 in × 4 in (14 cm × 10.2 cm)		Currier Museum of Art, Manchester, NH	Scene: retriever.
Duck Stamp Design, etching on paper/print	view	1942	3 in × 5 in (7.6 cm × 12.7 cm)			Scene: waterfowl in waterscape.
Tent, Lake Tahoe, watercolor, pencil on paper	color image		13.5 in × 19 in (34.3 cm × 48.3 cm)			
Hunter, charcoal	view					
The Call, engraving					Addison Gallery of American Art, Phillips Academy, Andover, MA	
Portage, engraving					Addison Gallery of American Art, Phillips Academy, Andover, MA	
Pulling the Canoe, engraving					Addison Gallery of American Art, Phillips Academy, Andover, MA	

== Bibliography ==
- Bedford, F. "Benson Biography 2". Faith Andrews Bedford. Archived from the original on 2012-03-25.
- Bedford, F (2000). The sporting art of Frank W. Benson. Jaffrey, NH: David R. Godine. ISBN 1-56792-111-6.
- Benson, F.; Paff, A. (1917). Etchings and Drypoints by Frank W. Benson. Boston and New York: Houghton Mifflin Company.
- Benson, F.; Paff, A. (1919). Etchings and Drypoints by Frank W. Benson. Boston and New York: Houghton Mifflin Company.
- Chambers, B. "Frank W. Benson, Red and Gold". Butler Institute of American Art. Archived from the original on 2011-09-27.
- "Frank W. Benson, American Impressionist, Exhibition". Peabody Essex Museum. Archived from the original on 2011-07-25.
- "Frank W. Benson, American Impressionist, Interactive presentation, Gallery". Peabody Essex Museum. Archived from the original on 2011-07-25.
- "Frank W. Benson, American Impressionist, Interactive presentation, Timeline". Peabody Essex Museum. Archived from the original on 2011-07-25.
- "Frank W. Benson, Collection". Boston Museum of Art.
- "Frank W. Benson, Collection". Cleveland Museum of Art, Ohio.
- "Frank W. Benson, Collection". National of Art, Washington D.C.
- "Frank W. Benson, Collection". University of New Hampshire.
- "Frank Weston Benson, Collection". Art Institute of Chicago.
- "Portrait of My Daughters". Worcester Art Museum.
- The Sisters, Terra Foundation for American Art
- "Summer". Rhode Island School of Design Museum. Archived from the original on 2011-06-10.
- "Smithsonian Institution Research Information System (SIRIS)". Smithsonian Institution.
- "Sunlight". Indianapolis Museum of Art.
