= Sunlight (Benson) =

Oil painting by Frank Weston Benson

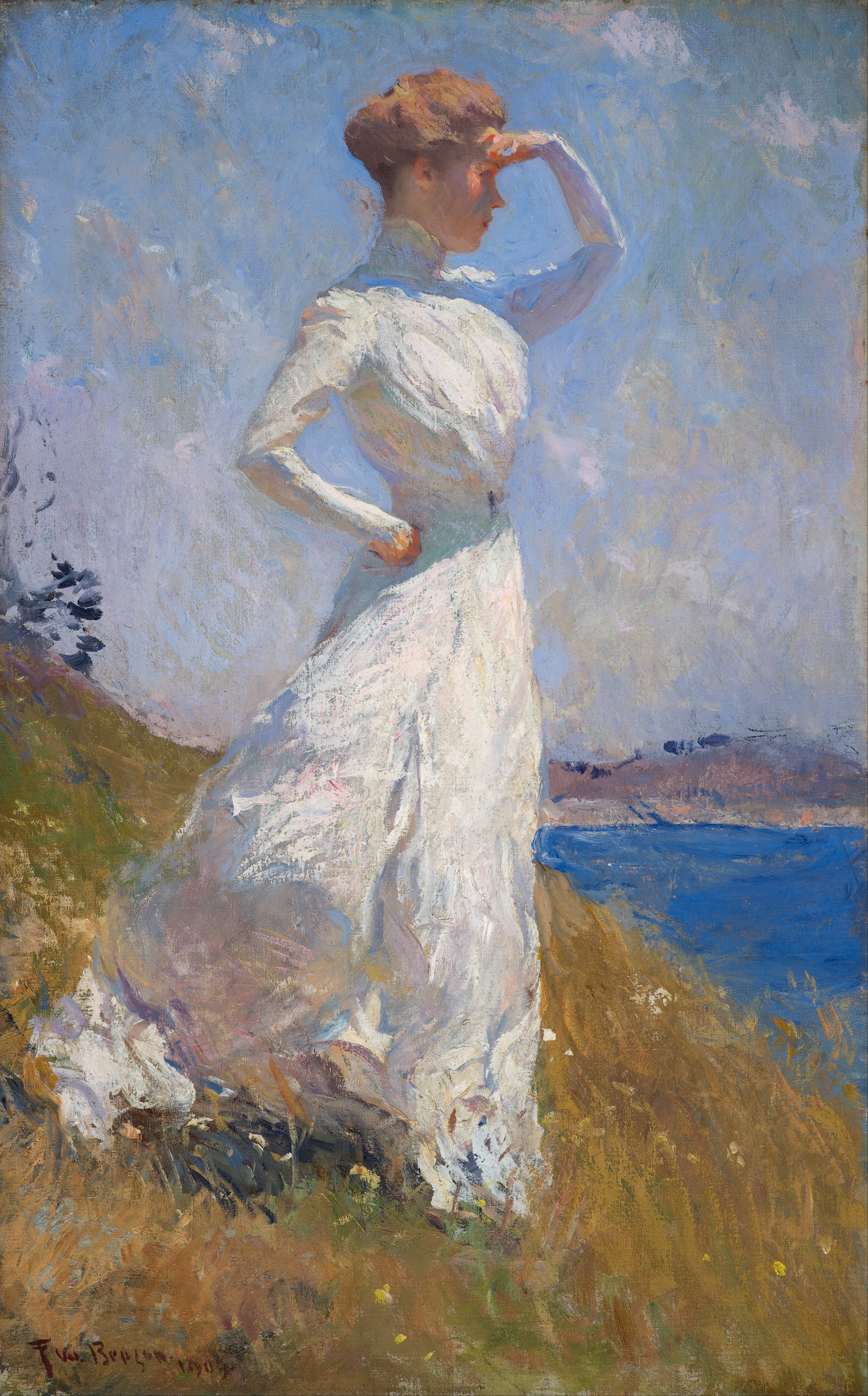
- Artist: Frank Weston Benson
- Year: 1909
- Medium: oil on canvas
- Dimensions: 81 cm × 51 cm (32 in × 20 in)
- Location: Indianapolis Museum of Art; Indianapolis, Indiana

Sunlight is an oil painting by Frank Weston Benson currently in the permanent collection at the Indianapolis Museum of Art.

== Description ==
Sunlight is created in the American impressionist style. It is a portrait of a woman, who has been identified as Benson's daughter, Eleanor, standing on a hill, looking out towards the Atlantic Ocean off Penobscot Bay in Maine. She is in a white dress that is getting ruffled by the wind blowing off the ocean. Her left hand is up, shielding her face from the sun, while her right hand is planted on her hip, a pose Benson used multiple times. Because of the woman shielding her eyes form the sun, it is likely that the sunlight is the actual subject of the painting.

== Historical information ==
Frank W Benson started working with the Impressionist style at the turn of the 20th century, and started exclusively using the style by 1909. Benson was one of the forerunners of American Impressionism, especially within the Ten American Painters. Benson was known for painting the idealized world, especially that of the leisure of New England.

Benson was, like most Impressionists, very interested in light. Benson himself stated that, "I follow the light, where it comes from, where it goes."

=== Acquisition ===
Painted in 1909, the painting was included in the Sixth Annual Exhibition of Works by American Artists, December 4, 1910 - January 1, 1911. It was later purchased from the artist by the John Herron Art Institute, now Indianapolis Museum of Art, in 1911.

== See also ==
- List of works by Frank Weston Benson
- List of artworks at the Indianapolis Museum of Art
