= List of wildlife works of art by Frank Weston Benson =

Frank Weston Benson made paintings, drawings and etchings of Wildlife. He also made portraits, waterscapes, landscapes, interiors and other works of art.

Benson, an avid birdwatcher and hunter from a young age, spent nearly every non-winter weekend hunting or fishing. He initially became interested in painting to capture the wildlife he enjoyed, particularly birds. Benson's interest in painting initially grew out of his desire to be an ornithological illustrator. As a teenager, he spent the spring, summer and fall outdoors nearly every weekend bird watching, hunting or fishing. In 1892 Benson bought a hunting shack on Cape Cod with his brothers-in-law, Edward Peirson and Maurice Richardson. Swan Flight, exhibited at the St. Botolph Club in 1893, was Benson's first known exhibition of wildfowl. Entering the turn of the century wildfowl was not a marketable subject, but once he began creating and exhibiting his works the wildfowl paintings always sold.

Benson, a sportsman at heart, had a solid body of work of wildlife scenes and birds, generally waterfowl. His works included oil paintings, watercolors, etchings and drypoint.

Benson made Swan Flight, a group of wild swans in formation against a gray sky from the Cape Cod hunting cabin off of Nauset that he bought with his brothers-in-law. It was the first work he exhibited of wildfowl, a subject matter that Benson explored over the years of his artistic career. The painting was sold soon after it was completed, a dynamic that continued throughout his career. To a New York dealer, Benson once expressed: "I made a [painting of a wildfowl] the other day at home and I looked forward to exhibiting it and, almost before it was dry, a visitor saw it and carried it off! It’s my good fortune to be doing what people like, but it keeps me on the jump." 4

Early Morning" is the culmination of Benson's appreciation of birds and Japanese composition, which was popular both in Boston and Paris. The silhouetted images of the birds flying over water is similar to the Japanese screen by Maruyama Ōkyo "Geese Flying over a Beach". One of Benson's early interests was depiction of the bird life near Salem; His first oil paintings are still lifes of birds. Benson may have seen that screen at Boston importer Bunkyo Matsuki's shop or the Matsuki home in Salem before it was purchased by Charles Freer in 1898. Having seen the work at a New York exhibition in 1900, a New York Times critic noted that it was "especially good… with the ducks in flight and the gray expanse of marsh and sky rose-flushed in the east with the dawn."

== Wildlife ==
Title	Image	Year	Dimensions	Collection	Comments
Swan Flight, oil on canvas		1893	31.5 in x 39.5 in (80 cm x 100.3 cm) IAP 20780419	Huntington Museum of Art, Huntington, WV	
Canada Geese, watercolor on paper with traces of pencil		1895	13 in x 18 in (33 cm x 45.7 cm)		Scene: Canada geese in waterscape.
Early Morning (or Geese Flying over a Beach) in the style of Maruyama Ōkyo, oil on canvas		c. 1899	24.1 in x 60.1 in (61.2 cm x 152.7 cm) IAP 20492451	Museum of Fine Arts, Boston, Boston, MA	
Redhead Ducks, watercolor on paper	b&w image	1907	13.4 in x 19.7 in (34 cm x 50 cm)IAP 20491836	Museum of Fine Arts, Boston, Boston, MA	Scene: redheads.
Little Old Squaw, etching and drypoint/print		1912		Museum of Fine Arts, Boston, Boston, MA	
Blue Bills, etching/print		1912	5.9 in x 7.1 in (15 cm x 18 cm)	Museum of Fine Arts, Boston, Boston, MA	Scene: waterfowl (likely greater scaups).
Eider Ducks in Winter, watercolor/gouache/graphite on wove paper		c. 1913	19.7 in x 26.8 in (50 cm x 68.1 cm)IAP 23570018		Scene: eiders afloat in waterscape.
Eider Ducks Flying, watercolor/graphite on wove paper		c. 1913	20 in x 27 in (50.8 cm x 68.6 cm) IAP 89170023		Scene: eiders in flight near clouds.
Mallards, drypoint etching/print	view	1913		Cleveland Museum of Art, Cleveland, OH	Scene: mallards in waterscape.
Fish Hawk, etching on zinc plate/print		1913	11.8 in x 9.8 in (30 cm x 24.9 cm)	Museum of Fine Arts, Boston, Boston, MA	Scene: bird of prey (likely osprey) with prey.
Ducks Swimming, etching/print	view	1914	5 in x 10 in (12.7 cm x 25.4 cm)	Museum of Fine Arts, Boston, Boston, MA; Herbert F. Johnson Museum of Art, Cornell University, Ithaca, NY	Scene: ducks in body of water.
Old Squaws, drypoint etching/print		1915	5.8 in x 7.8 in (14.7 cm x 19.8 cm)	Museum of Art, University of New Hampshire, Durham, NH; Museum of Fine Arts, Boston, Boston, MA; Herbert F. Johnson Museum of Art, Cornell University, Ithaca, NY	Scene: waterfowl in flight over waterscape.
Bluebills, intaglio engraving	view	1915	19 in x 15.5 in (48.3 cm x 39.4 cm)		Scene: waterfowl (likely greater scaups) in flight.
Flight of Blue Bills (or Flight of Bluebills), drypoint etching on zinc plate/print	view	1915	5 in x 11.8 in (12.7 cm x 30 cm) or 7.9 in x 11.8 in (20.1 cm x 30 cm)	Museum of Fine Arts, Boston, Boston, MA	Scene: waterfowl (likely greater scaups) in flight.
Solitude, drypoint etching/print	view	1915		Cleveland Museum of Art, Cleveland, OH; Museum of Fine Arts, Boston, Boston, MA	
Yellowlegs, drypoint etching/print	view	1915	4 in x 5 in (10.2 cm x 12.7 cm)	Cleveland Museum of Art, Cleveland, OH; Herbert F. Johnson Museum of Art, Cornell University, Ithaca, NY	Scene: yellowlegs (likely Tringas).
Yellowlegs, drypoint etching/print	view	1915	3 in x 4 in (7.6 cm x 10.2 cm)	Mead Art Museum, Amherst College, Amherst, MA	Scene: yellowlegs (likely Tringas).
Blue Heron, etching on Shogun paper/print	view	1915	6 in x 4 in (15.2 cm x 10.2 cm)	Cleveland Museum of Art, Cleveland, OH; Herbert F. Johnson Museum of Art, Cornell University, Ithaca, NY	Scene: waterfowl standing in waterscape.
Lone Goose, etching/print	view	1915	4 in x 6 in (10.2 cm x 15.2 cm)	Cleveland Museum of Art, Cleveland, OH	Scene: Canada goose standing in waterscape.
Geese against the Sky, etching/print	view	1915	5.8 in x 10.8 in (14.7 cm x 27.4 cm)		Scene: wildfowl in flight over waterscape.
Black Breast Plover, etching on copper plate/print		1915		Cleveland Museum of Art, Cleveland, OH; Museum of Fine Arts, Boston, Boston, MA	Scene: plover
Duck and Ripples, etching/print	view	1915	4 in x 6 in (10.2 cm x 15.2 cm)	Museum of Fine Arts, Boston, Boston, MA	
Frightened Ducks, drypoint etching/print	view	1915	4 in x 5 in (10.2 cm x 12.7 cm)	Museum of Fine Arts, Boston, Boston, MA; Mead Art Museum, Amherst College, Amherst, MA	Scene: ducks in flight in waterscape.
Wood Ducks, etching/print	view	1915	5 in x 4 in (12.7 cm x 10.2 cm)	Herbert F. Johnson Museum of Art, Cornell University, Ithaca, NY	Scene: ducks in waterscape.
Wood Duck Family (or The Duck Family), drypoint etching/print	view	1915	5.5 in x 7.5 in (14 cm x 19.1 cm)	Museum of Fine Arts, Boston, Boston, MA; Herbert F. Johnson Museum of Art, Cornell University, Ithaca, NY	Scene: wood ducks in waterscape.
Wild Swans, drypoint etching/print	view	1915		Cleveland Museum of Art, Cleveland, OH; Museum of Fine Arts, Boston, Boston, MA Scene: swans.	
Brown Pelican, drypoint etching on Shogun paper/print	view	1915	7.9 in x 5.9 in (20.1 cm x 15 cm)	Museum of Fine Arts, Boston, Boston, MA; Herbert F. Johnson Museum of Art, Cornell University, Ithaca, NY	Scene: brown pelican.
Over the Tree Tops (or Over the Treetops), etching/print	view	1915	5 in x 7.9 in (12.7 cm x 20.1 cm)	Museum of Fine Arts, Boston, Boston, MA; Herbert F. Johnson Museum of Art, Cornell University, Ithaca, NY	Scene: waterfowl in flight.
Perching Pelican, etching/print	view	1915	5 in x 4 in (12.7 cm x 10.2 cm)	Museum of Fine Arts, Boston, Boston, MA; Herbert F. Johnson Museum of Art, Cornell University, Ithaca, NY	Scene: waterfowl (likely brown pelican).
Wild Geese Resting, drypoint etching/print	view	1915	6 in x 8 in (15.2 cm x 20.3 cm)	Museum of Fine Arts, Boston, Boston, MA; Herbert F. Johnson Museum of Art, Cornell University, Ithaca, NY	Scene: Canada geese in waterscape.
Dead Goose, drypoint etching/print	view view	1915	4 in x 6 in (10.2 cm x 15.2 cm) or 7.6 in x 8.9 in (19.3 cm x 22.6 cm)	Museum of Fine Arts, Boston, Boston, MA; Frye Art Museum, Seattle, WA; Herbert F. Johnson Museum of Art, Cornell University, Ithaca, NY	
Male Whistler, drypoint etching/print	view	1915	4 in x 6 in (10.2 cm x 15.2 cm)	Museum of Fine Arts, Boston, Boston, MA	Scene: whistler (likely Pachycephalinae).
Bald Eagle, drypoint etching/print	view	1915	7.9 in x 5.8 in (20.1 cm x 14.7 cm)	Museum of Fine Arts, Boston, Boston, MA; Herbert F. Johnson Museum of Art, Cornell University, Ithaca, NY	Scene: bald eagle.
Morning, etching/print	view view	1915	7.8 in x 9.8 in (19.8 cm x 24.9 cm)	Cleveland Museum of Art, Cleveland, OH; Museum of Fine Arts, Boston, Boston, MA; Herbert F. Johnson Museum of Art, Cornell University, Ithaca, NY	Scene: Canada geese in flight in waterscape.
Egrets, etching/print	view	1915	7.9 in x 6 in (20.1 cm x 15.2 cm)		Scene: egrets (2) stand in waterscape.
Whistlers, drypoint etching/print	view	1915	5.8 in x 7.8 in (14.7 cm x 19.8 cm) or 9.3 in x 11.3 in (23.6 cm x 28.7 cm)	Museum of Fine Arts, Boston, Boston, MA; Mead Art Museum, Amherst College, Amherst, MA	Scene: whistlers in waterscape.
The Mirror, drypoint etching/print	view	1916	5.8 in x 7.8 in (14.7 cm x 19.8 cm)	Cleveland Museum of Art, Cleveland, OH; Museum of Fine Arts, Boston, Boston, MA; Herbert F. Johnson Museum of Art, Cornell University, Ithaca, NY	Scene: waterfowl reflected in body of water.
Pair of Yellowlegs, drypoint etching/print	view	1916	3 in x 4 in (7.6 cm x 10.2 cm)	Cleveland Museum of Art, Cleveland, OH; Museum of Fine Arts, Boston, Boston, MA; Herbert F. Johnson Museum of Art, Cornell University, Ithaca, NY	Scene: yellowlegs (likely Tringas).
Pintails, drypoint etching/print	view	1916	13.8 in x 10.6 in (35.1 cm x 26.9 cm)	Cleveland Museum of Art, Cleveland, OH; Museum of Fine Arts, Boston, Boston, MA; Herbert F. Johnson Museum of Art, Cornell University, Ithaca, NY	Scene: pintails (likely northern pintails).
Mallard Rising, etching/print	view	1916	7 in x 5 in (17.8 cm x 12.7 cm) or 6.9 in x 7.9 in (17.5 cm x 20.1 cm)	Museum of Fine Arts, Boston, Boston, MA; Herbert F. Johnson Museum of Art, Cornell University, Ithaca, NY	Scene: lone mallard in flight in waterscape.
Migrating Geese, drypoint etching/print		1916		Museum of Fine Arts, Boston, Boston, MA	Scene: waterfowl in waterscape.
Migrating Geese, drypoint etching/print	view view	1916	10 in x 8 in (25.4 cm x 20.3 cm)	Mead Art Museum, Amherst College, Amherst, MA; Herbert F. Johnson Museum of Art, Cornell University, Ithaca, NY	Scene: Canada geese in flight.
Ducks, etching/print	view	1916	7.8 in x 9.5 in (19.8 cm x 24.1 cm)		Scene: ducks in waterscape.
Geese Alighting, drypoint etching on wove paper/print		c. 1916	14.1 in x 11.3 in (35.8 cm x 28.7 cm) or 16 in x 11.5 in (40.6 cm x 29.2 cm)	Brooklyn Museum, Brooklyn, NY; Cleveland Museum of Art, Cleveland, OH; Museum of Fine Arts, Boston, Boston, MA; Akron Art Museum, Akron, Ohio	Geese Alighting was made by drypoint, "with much burr". Burrs are edges created by the drypoint technique, sometimes scraped down to be less prominent.
Pair of Ducks, pencil etching on Shogun paper	view	1916	4.8 in x 3.9 in (12.2 cm x 9.9 cm)		Scene: ducks (2) in waterscape.
In the Clouds, drypoint etching/print	view	1916	3.9 in x 5 in (9.9 cm x 12.7 cm)	Museum of Fine Arts, Boston, Boston, MA	Scene: Canada geese in flight.
The V, drypoint etching	search collection	1917	10.1 in x 15 in (25.7 cm x 38.1 cm)	California Palace of the Legion of Honor, San Francisco, CA	
Wild Geese, etching/print	search collection	1917	15.5 in x 20.5 in (39.4 cm x 52.1 cm)	Achenbach Foundation for Graphic Arts, California Palace of the Legion of Honor, San Francisco, CA; Museum of Fine Arts, Boston, Boston, MA	Scene: waterfowl in waterscape (landing from right).
Wild Geese, etching on laid paper/print		1917	7 in x 10 in (17.8 cm x 25.4 cm)		Scene: waterfowl in waterscape (flying toward right).
Scaling Down, drypoint etching on wove paper/print	view	1917	4 in x 3 in (10.2 cm x 7.6 cm) or 4 in x 5 in (10.2 cm x 12.7 cm)	Worcester Art Museum, Worcester, MA	Scene: waterfowl in a waterscape.
Incoming Geese, etching/print	view	1917	6 in x 4 in (15.2 cm x 10.2 cm)	Museum of Fine Arts, Boston, Boston, MA	Scene: Canada geese (2) in flight.
Geese, drypoint etching/print	view	1917	10 in x 15 in (25.4 cm x 38.1 cm)	Museum of Fine Arts, Boston, Boston, MA; Herbert F. Johnson Museum of Art, Cornell University, Ithaca, NY	Scene: Canada geese (5) in flight.
Study of Geese, drypoint etching/print	view	1917	3.8 in x 5.9 in (9.7 cm x 15 cm)	Museum of Fine Arts, Boston, Boston, MA; Herbert F. Johnson Museum of Art, Cornell University, Ithaca, NY	Scene: Canada geese (2) in flight.
Snowy Herons, etching/print	view	1917	4.9 in x 3.9 in (12.4 cm x 9.9 cm)	Cleveland Museum of Art, Cleveland, OH; Museum of Fine Arts, Boston, Boston, MA	Scene: snowy herons.
Swans and Teal, drypoint etching/print	view	1917	8 in x 10 in (20.3 cm x 25.4 cm)	Museum of Fine Arts, Boston, Boston, MA; Herbert F. Johnson Museum of Art, Cornell University, Ithaca, NY	Scene: swans; teal (likely Anatinae).
Goose and Teal, drypoint etching on wove paper/print	view	1917	6 in x 8 in (15.2 cm x 20.3 cm)	Museum of Fine Arts, Boston, Boston, MA; Herbert F. Johnson Museum of Art, Cornell University, Ithaca, NY	Scene: Canada goose and teal (likely Anatinae) in waterscape.
Mallard Drake, etching/print	view	1917	5.9 in x 7.9 in (15 cm x 20.1 cm)	Museum of Fine Arts, Boston, Boston, MA; Herbert F. Johnson Museum of Art, Cornell University, Ithaca, NY	Scene: lone mallard in waterscape.
Sheldrakes (or Sheldrake), etching/print	view	1917	6.8 in x 10.8 in (17.3 cm x 27.4 cm)	Museum of Fine Arts, Boston, Boston, MA; Herbert F. Johnson Museum of Art, Cornell University, Ithaca, NY	Scene: shelduck (4) in flight.
Redheads, drypoint etching on wove paper/print	view	1917	5.9 in x 7.9 in (15 cm x 20.1 cm)	Museum of Fine Arts, Boston, Boston, MA; Art Institute of Chicago, Chicago, IL; Herbert F. Johnson Museum of Art, Cornell University, Ithaca, NY	Scene: redheads (4) in flight.
High-Flying Ducks, etching/print	view	1917	7.9 in x 5.9 in (20.1 cm x 15 cm)	Museum of Fine Arts, Boston, Boston, MA; Herbert F. Johnson Museum of Art, Cornell University, Ithaca, NY	Scene: ducks in flight.
Single Duck, drypoint etching/print	view	1917	4 in x 5.3 in (10.2 cm x 13.5 cm)	Museum of Fine Arts, Boston, Boston, MA	Scene: lone duck in body of water.
After Sunset, etching/print	view	1917	6 in x 8 in (15.2 cm x 20.3 cm)	Museum of Fine Arts, Boston, Boston, MA; Herbert F. Johnson Museum of Art, Cornell University, Ithaca, NY	Scene: waterfowl in flight in waterscape.
Canada Goose, etching/print	view	1917	4 in x 5 in (10.2 cm x 12.7 cm)	Herbert F. Johnson Museum of Art, Cornell University, Ithaca, NY	Scene: Canada goose standing in water.
The Alarm, etching/print	view	1917	8 in x 10 in (20.3 cm x 25.4 cm)	Museum of Fine Arts, Boston, Boston, MA; Herbert F. Johnson Museum of Art, Cornell University, Ithaca, NY	Scene: wildfowl in flight in waterscape.
Ducks in the Rain, etching on laid paper/print		1918	12 in x 11.5 in (30.5 cm x 29.2 cm) or 8 in x 6 in (20.3 cm x 15.2 cm)	Museum of Art, University of New Hampshire, Durham, NH; Frye Art Museum, Seattle, WA; Herbert F. Johnson Museum of Art, Cornell University, Ithaca, NY	Benson demonstrated his skill as an etcher through the depiction of reflection and shadow in Ducks in the Rain. Thin vertical lines denote rain and flatten the sense of depth or distance. Images were printed on shogun, a Japanese art paper.
Mates, etching/print		1918	6 in x 7.9 in (15.2 cm x 20.1 cm)	Metropolitan Museum of Art, New York, NY; Museum of Fine Arts, Boston, Boston, MA	Scene: ducks (2) in body of water.
Herons in a Pine Tree, drypoint etching/print	view	1918	13.7 in x 9.8 in (34.8 cm x 24.9 cm)	Achenbach Foundation for Graphic Arts, California Palace of the Legion of Honor, San Francisco, CA; Museum of Fine Arts, Boston, Boston, MA	Scene: herons (3) perched on pine tree limbs.
Souvenir of Long Point, drypoint etching/print	view	1918	7.9 in x 5.9 in (20.1 cm x 15 cm)	Museum of Fine Arts, Boston, Boston, MA	Scene: lone waterfowl over water.
Three Geese (or Three Flying Geese), drypoint etching/print	view	1918	8 in x 14.6 in (20.3 cm x 37.1 cm)	Museum of Fine Arts, Boston, Boston, MA; Herbert F. Johnson Museum of Art, Cornell University, Ithaca, NY; Butler Institute of American Art, Youngstown, OH	Scene: Canada geese (3) in flight in waterscape.
Eider Drake, drypoint etching/print	view	1918	6 in x 7.1 in (15.2 cm x 18 cm)	Museum of Fine Arts, Boston, Boston, MA	Scene: eider in flight.
Eagle in the Sky, etching on Shogun paper/print	view	1918	13.8 in x 10.6 in (35.1 cm x 26.9 cm)	Cleveland Museum of Art, Cleveland, OH	Scene: bald eagle.
Winter Yellowlegs, drypoint etching/print	view	1918	6.9 in x 10.9 in (17.5 cm x 27.7 cm)	Cleveland Museum of Art, Cleveland, OH; Museum of Fine Arts, Boston, Boston, MA	Scene: yellowlegs (likely Tringas) standing in waterscape.
Mallards, No. 2, etching/print	view	1918	8.8 in x 10.9 in (22.4 cm x 27.7 cm)	California Palace of the Legion of Honor, San Francisco, CA; Museum of Fine Arts, Boston, Boston, MA; Herbert F. Johnson Museum of Art, Cornell University, Ithaca, NY	Scene: mallards (2) in flight.
The Visitor, etching/print	view	1918	3 in x 5 in (7.6 cm x 12.7 cm)	Museum of Fine Arts, Boston, Boston, MA; Herbert F. Johnson Museum of Art, Cornell University, Ithaca, NY	Scene: waterfowl in waterscape.
Ducks in Flight, drypoint etching/print	view	1918	3 in x 5 in (7.6 cm x 12.7 cm)	Museum of Fine Arts, Boston, Boston, MA; Herbert F. Johnson Museum of Art, Cornell University, Ithaca, NY	Scene: ducks in flight.
Old Squaws, No. 2, drypoint etching/print	view	1918	5 in x 10 in (12.7 cm x 25.4 cm)	Museum of Fine Arts, Boston, Boston, MA; Herbert F. Johnson Museum of Art, Cornell University, Ithaca, NY	Scene: waterfowl in flight.
Sprigtail, etching/print		1918		Museum of Fine Arts, Boston, Boston, MA	
Morning Flight, etching on wove paper/print	view	1918	12.5 in x 15.4 in (31.8 cm x 39.1 cm) or 8 in x 9.8 in (20.3 cm x 24.9 cm)	Museum of Fine Arts, Boston, Boston, MA; Herbert F. Johnson Museum of Art, Cornell University, Ithaca, NY	Scene: waterfowl in flight over waterscape.
Pintail Drinking, etching/print	view	1918	5.9 in x 4 in (15 cm x 10.2 cm)	Herbert F. Johnson Museum of Art, Cornell University, Ithaca, NY	Scene: pintails (likely northern pintails) in waterscape.
Flying Ducks, etching/print	view	1919	8.9 in x 6.9 in (22.6 cm x 17.5 cm)	Cleveland Museum of Art, Cleveland, OH	Scene: ducks in flight in waterscape.
Two Geese, etching/print	view	1919	3.8 in x 5.8 in (9.7 cm x 14.7 cm) IAP 73530018		Scene: two Canada geese in body of water.
Broad Bills (or Broadbills), drypoint etching on copper plate/print	view	1919		Cleveland Museum of Art, Cleveland, OH; Museum of Fine Arts, Boston, Boston, MA	Scene: broadbills.
Yellowlegs, No. 2, drypoint etching/print	view	1919	7.9 in x 9.9 in (20.1 cm x 25.1 cm)	Cleveland Museum of Art, Cleveland, OH; Museum of Fine Arts, Boston, Boston, MA; Herbert F. Johnson Museum of Art, Cornell University, Ithaca, NY	Scene: yellowlegs (likely Tringas).
Pair of Geese, drypoint etching/print	image	1919		Museum of Fine Arts, Boston, Boston, MA	Scene: Canada geese.
Heron Fishing, drypoint etching/print	view view	1919	3.5 in x 5.5 in (8.9 cm x 14 cm)	Cleveland Museum of Art, Cleveland, OH; Museum of Fine Arts, Boston, Boston, MA; Herbert F. Johnson Museum of Art, Cornell University, Ithaca, NY	
Black Ducks, No. 2, drypoint etching/print	view	1919	10 in x 8 in (25.4 cm x 20.3 cm)	Cleveland Museum of Art, Cleveland, OH; Museum of Fine Arts, Boston, Boston, MA	Scene: ducks in flight.
Chickadees, drypoint etching/print	view	1919	8 in x 6 in (20.3 cm x 15.2 cm)	Museum of Fine Arts, Boston, Boston, MA	Scene: chickadees.
Going North, etching/print	view	1919	3.5 in x 5.5 in (8.9 cm x 14 cm)	Museum of Fine Arts, Boston, Boston, MA	Scene: Canada geese (2) in flight.
Water Lilies, drypoint etching, print	view	1919	7.9 in x 9.8 in (20.1 cm x 24.9 cm)	Museum of Fine Arts, Boston, Boston, MA; Herbert F. Johnson Museum of Art, Cornell University, Ithaca, NY	Scene: waterfowl in waterscape with water lilies.
Ducks Flying over Water, etching on laid paper/print	view	1919	8.9 in x 6.8 in (22.6 cm x 17.3 cm)	Art Institute of Chicago, Chicago, IL	Scene: ducks in flight over waterscape.
Rising geese, watercolor on paper	color image	1920	20.3 in x 15.3 in (51.6 cm x 38.9 cm) IAP 89170093		Scene: coastal scene depicting Canada geese (2) taking flight over shimmering water dotted with patches of tall reeds.
Dark Pool, drypoint etching on zinc plate/print	view	1920	7.9 in x 11.9 in (20.1 cm x 30.2 cm)	Museum of Fine Arts, Boston, Boston, MA; Metropolitan Museum of Art, New York, NY	
Blackbirds and Rushes, drypoint etching/print	view	1920		Indianapolis Museum of Art, Indianapolis, IN; Museum of Fine Arts, Boston, Boston, MA	
Three Yellowlegs, drypoint etching on Hodamura paper/print	view view	1920	4.5 in x 5.9 in (11.4 cm x 15 cm)	Museum of Fine Arts, Boston, Boston, MA; Mead Art Museum, Amherst College, Amherst, MA	Scene: yellowlegs (likely Tringas) (3) in waterscape.
Summer Yellowlegs, drypoint etching/print	view view	1920	5 in x 3.8 in (12.7 cm x 9.7 cm)	Cleveland Museum of Art, Cleveland, OH; Museum of Fine Arts, Boston, Boston, MA; Herbert F. Johnson Museum of Art, Cornell University, Ithaca, NY	Scene: yellowlegs (likely Tringas).
Wide Marshes, etching on Japanese vellum/print	view	1920	11.5 in x 14 in (29.2 cm x 35.6 cm) or 7 in x 11 in (17.8 cm x 27.9 cm)	Colby College Museum of Art, Waterville, ME	Scene: waterfowl in waterscape.
Widgeon Rising, drypoint etching/print	view	1920	11.3 in x 7.5 in (28.7 cm x 19.1 cm)	California Palace of the Legion of Honor, San Francisco, CA; Museum of Fine Arts, Boston, Boston, MA; Herbert F. Johnson Museum of Art, Cornell University, Ithaca, NY	Scene: lone wigeon in flight.
Yellowlegs Alighting, drypoint etching/print	view	1920	13.1 in x 15.4 in (33.3 cm x 39.1 cm) or 8.9 in x 14.9 in (22.6 cm x 37.8 cm)	Cleveland Museum of Art, Cleveland, OH; Museum of Fine Arts, Boston, Boston, MA; Memorial Art Gallery, University of Rochester, Rochester, NY; Mead Art Museum, Amherst College, Amherst, MA	Scene: yellowlegs (likely Tringas).
Ducks at Dawn, drypoint etching on zinc plate/print	view	1920	7 in x 9 in (17.8 cm x 22.9 cm)	Museum of Fine Arts, Boston, Boston, MA; Herbert F. Johnson Museum of Art, Cornell University, Ithaca, NY	Scene: ducks in flight in waterscape.
Shoveller Drake, etching/print	view	1920	10 in x 8 in (25.4 cm x 20.3 cm)	Museum of Fine Arts, Boston, Boston, MA; Herbert F. Johnson Museum of Art, Cornell University, Ithaca, NY	Scene: lone shoveler in flight.
Over Sunk Marsh, drypoint etching on zinc plate/print	view	1920	6 in x 7.9 in (15.2 cm x 20.1 cm)	Museum of Fine Arts, Boston, Boston, MA; Herbert F. Johnson Museum of Art, Cornell University, Ithaca, NY	Scene: waterfowl in flight over marsh.
Two Crows, drypoint etching/print	view	1920	2 in x 5 in (5.1 cm x 12.7 cm) or 2 in x 2.9 in (5.1 cm x 7.4 cm)	Museum of Fine Arts, Boston, Boston, MA; Herbert F. Johnson Museum of Art, Cornell University, Ithaca, NY	Scene: crows.
Grouse on a Pine Bough (or Grouse on a Pine Branch), drypoint etching/print	view	1920	3 in x 2 in (7.6 cm x 5.1 cm)	Museum of Fine Arts, Boston, Boston, MA; Herbert F. Johnson Museum of Art, Cornell University, Ithaca, NY	Scene: grouse.
Rendezvous, drypoint etching/print	view	1920	6 in x 5 in (15.2 cm x 12.7 cm) or 3.8 in x 4.9 in (9.7 cm x 12.4 cm)	Museum of Fine Arts, Boston, Boston, MA; Herbert F. Johnson Museum of Art, Cornell University, Ithaca, NY	Scene: waterfowl in waterscape.
Reflections, drypoint etching on zinc/print	view	1920	5 in x 8 in (12.7 cm x 20.3 cm)	Herbert F. Johnson Museum of Art, Cornell University, Ithaca, NY	Scene: lone wildfowl with reflection in waterscape.
Pintails Decoyed, oil on canvas		1921	36 in x 44 in (91.4 cm x 111.8 cm) IAP 20492453	Museum of Fine Arts, Boston, Boston, MA	Scene: pintail ducks float across the surface of a reed-lined river as other ducks take flight.
Ducks Alighting, etching on wove paper/print	view	1921	5.9 in x 4.5 in (15 cm x 11.4 cm)	Metropolitan Museum of Art, New York, NY; Achenbach Foundation for Graphic Arts, California Palace of the Legion of Honor, San Francisco, CA; Art Institute of Chicago, Chicago, IL	Scene: ducks (4) coming in to land in waterscape.
Calm, etching/print	view	1921	5 in x 6.8 in (12.7 cm x 17.3 cm)	Metropolitan Museum of Art, New York, NY; Museum of Fine Arts, Boston, Boston, MA; Herbert F. Johnson Museum of Art, Cornell University, Ithaca, NY	Scene: waterfowl in waterscape.
Three Geese, etching/lithograph	view	1921	11.3 in x 15.8 in (28.7 cm x 40.1 cm)		Scene: Canada geese (3) in flight in waterscape.
The Resting Place, etching/print	view	1921	4.9 in x 3.9 in (12.4 cm x 9.9 cm)	Museum of Fine Arts, Boston, Boston, MA	Scene: waterfowl in waterscape.
Three Canada Geese Taking Flight (or Three Canada Geese), etching/lithograph	view	c. 1921	12 in x 16 in (30.5 cm x 40.6 cm)		Scene: Canada geese (3) in waterscape.
Against the Morning Sky, oil on canvas		1922	60 in x 45 in (152.4 cm x 114.3 cm) IAP 89550006		Scene: geese rise from marsh against morning sky.
Against the Morning Sky, oil on canvas	color image	1922	43 in x 25.5 in (109.2 cm x 64.8 cm)		Scene: geese rise from marsh against morning sky.
Against the Morning Sky, oil on canvas		1922	32 in x 25.5 in (81.3 cm x 64.8 cm) IAP 61503158; IAP 8A220032		Scene: geese rise from marsh against morning sky.
Cloudy Dawn, etching on laid paper/print	view view	1922	9.8 in x 11.8 in (24.9 cm x 30 cm)	Cleveland Museum of Art, Cleveland, OH; Museum of Fine Arts, Boston, Boston, MA; Art Institute of Chicago, Chicago, IL	Scene: geese in flight.
Salmon, drypoint etching on zinc plate/print		1922	3.9 in x 4.7 in (9.9 cm x 11.9 cm)	Museum of Fine Arts, Boston, Boston, MA	
Hovering Geese, drypoint etching on zinc plate/print	view	1922	13.9 in x 10.8 in (35.3 cm x 27.4 cm)	Cleveland Museum of Art, Cleveland, OH; Museum of Fine Arts, Boston, Boston, MA	
Little Bluebills, drypoint etching on wove paper/print	view view	1922	7.9 in x 5.9 in (20.1 cm x 15 cm)	Museum of Fine Arts, Boston, Boston, MA; Art Institute of Chicago, Chicago, IL; Addison Gallery of American Art, Phillips Academy, Andover, MA	Scene: waterfowl (likely greater scaups).
After Sunset (or Long Point Sunset), oil on canvas	color image	1923	50 in x 40 in (127 cm x 101.6 cm)IAP 8A220011		Scene: ducks (4) flying over marshy at sunset.
Pintails in Flight over a Marsh (or Springing Pintails), watercolor/gouache/graphite on paperboard	color image	1923	20.6 in x 14.5 in (52.3 cm x 36.8 cm)		Scene: pintails (likely northern pintails) in marsh waterscape.
Geese in Flight, watercolor/pencil on paper	color image	1923	19.7 in x 13.8 in (50 cm x 35.1 cm)		Scene: Canada geese (2) in flight.
Great White Herons, etching		1923		Pennsylvania Academy of the Fine Arts, Philadelphia, PA	Benson, adept at capturing light in his paintings, demonstrates that skill in the creation of the etching Great White Herons. Benson "shows these graceful creatures in flight, the sunlight playing on their wide, white wings. Benson even managed to portray light in his etchings, with rich, velvety blacks, and mid-tones murky with the light of an approaching storm or the coming of dawn. These works earned him titles such as 'dean of American etchers,' and 'master of the sporting print.'
Herons at Rest, etching on wove paper/print	view	1923	11.9 in x 7.9 in (30.2 cm x 20.1 cm)	Metropolitan Museum of Art, New York, NY; Museum of Fine Arts, Boston, Boston, MA; Art Institute of Chicago, Chicago, IL	Scene: waterfowl in waterscape.
Ducks at Play, drypoint etching/print	view	1923	11 in x 13.8 in (27.9 cm x 35.1 cm)	Cleveland Museum of Art, Cleveland, OH; Mead Art Museum, Amherst College, Amherst, MA; Herbert F. Johnson Museum of Art, Cornell University, Ithaca, NY	Scene: ducks in waterscape.
Yellowlegs, No. 3, drypoint etching/print	view	1923	7.9 in x 5.9 in (20.1 cm x 15 cm)		Scene: yellowlegs (likely Tringas).
Soaring Fish Hawk, drypoint etching on copper plate/print	view	1923	5.9 in x 7.8 in (15 cm x 19.8 cm)	Museum of Fine Arts, Boston, Boston, MA	Scene: waterfowl (likely osprey).
Redheads, No. 2, drypoint etching on copper plate/print	view	1923	8 in x 10 in (20.3 cm x 25.4 cm)	Museum of Fine Arts, Boston, Boston, MA	Scene: redheads in flight over waterscape.
Lighting In, etching/print	view	c. 1923	8 in x 11 in (20.3 cm x 27.9 cm)	Museum of Fine Arts, Boston, Boston, MA; Herbert F. Johnson Museum of Art, Cornell University, Ithaca, NY	Scene: wildfowl in waterscape.
Rising Mallard, oil on canvas		1924	15 in x 21 in (38.1 cm x 53.3 cm) IAP 84780035		Scene: mallard.
Rising Mallards, watercolor on paper	view	1924	15 in x 21 in (38.1 cm x 53.3 cm)	Los Angeles County Museum of Art, Los Angeles, CA	Scene: mallards.
Mallards, watercolor		1924	14.5 in x 30.8 in (36.8 cm x 78.2 cm)	Private Collection	Scene: mallards in waterscape.
Scoters over Water, watercolor on paper	color image	1924	13.5 in x 19.5 in (34.3 cm x 49.5 cm)IAP 63007555	Private collection	Scene: scoters in flight over water.
Black Ducks at Dusk, etching/print	view	1924	4.9 in x 6.9 in (12.4 cm x 17.5 cm)	Achenbach Foundation for Graphic Arts, California Palace of the Legion of Honor, San Francisco, CA; Museum of Fine Arts, Boston, Boston, MA	Scene: ducks in flight.
Flying Widgeon, etching on laid paper/print	view	1924	9.7 in x 14.7 in (24.6 cm x 37.3 cm)	Achenbach Foundation for Graphic Arts, California Palace of the Legion of Honor, San Francisco, CA; Museum of Fine Arts, Boston, Boston, MA; Frye Art Museum, Seattle, WA	Scene: wigeon.
Dawn, etching on laid paper/print	view	1924	6.9 in x 9.8 in (17.5 cm x 24.9 cm) or 11.5 in x 12.9 in (29.2 cm x 32.8 cm)	Cleveland Museum of Art, Cleveland, OH; Museum of Fine Arts, Boston, MA; Akron Art Museum, Akron, Ohio	Scene: waterfowl coming in to land in waterscape.
On the Redhead Grounds, etching on laid paper/print		1924	15 in x 11.4 in (38.1 cm x 29 cm)	Museum of Fine Arts, Boston, Boston, MA; Frye Art Museum, Seattle, WA	Scene: redheads.
Rising Geese, drypoint etching on copper plate/print	view	1924	6.8 in x 8.8 in (17.3 cm x 22.4 cm)	Museum of Fine Arts, Boston, Boston, MA; Herbert F. Johnson Museum of Art, Cornell University, Ithaca, NY	Scene: waterfowl in waterscape.
Geese Over a Marsh, etching on laid paper	view	1924	7.9 in x 9.8 in (20.1 cm x 24.9 cm)		Scene: Canada geese in flight in marsh.
Baldpates, drypoint etching/print	view	1924	8 in x 10 in (20.3 cm x 25.4 cm)		Scene: American wigeon in waterscape.
Flock of Canvasbacks, drypoint etching on laid paper/print	view	1924	7.8 in x 9.8 in (19.8 cm x 24.9 cm)		Scene: canvasbacks flying in formation.
Evening (or Mallards), watercolor, gouache, and graphite on wove paper	color image	1925	25 in x 21 in (63.5 cm x 53.3 cm) IAP 86300001	Metropolitan Museum of Art, New York, NY	Scene: waterfowl (mallards) landing on pond in evening light.
Alert!, drypoint etching/print	view	1925	3.8 in x 4.9 in (9.7 cm x 12.4 cm) or 4.9 in x 7 in (12.4 cm x 17.8 cm)	Cleveland Museum of Art, Cleveland, OH; Art Institute of Chicago, Chicago, IL; Brooklyn Museum, Brooklyn, NY; Museum of Fine Arts, Boston, MA; Herbert F. Johnson Museum of Art, Cornell University, Ithaca, NY	Scene: waterfowl in a body of water.
Yellowlegs, watercolor on paper	color image	c. 1925	14.3 in x 19.8 in (36.3 cm x 50.3 cm)		Scene: yellowlegs (likely Tringas) standing at edge of water. Artwork commissioned Quincy Adams Shaw, family friend.
Flying Brant, drypoint etching/print	view	1925	4.9 in x 7 in (12.4 cm x 17.8 cm) or 15.5 in x 12.8 in (39.4 cm x 32.5 cm)	Metropolitan Museum of Art, New York, NY	Scene: brant geese (2) in flight.
In Island Pond, etching/print	view	1925	9.8 in x 7.8 in (24.9 cm x 19.8 cm)	Museum of Fine Arts, Boston, Boston, MA; Herbert F. Johnson Museum of Art, Cornell University, Ithaca, NY	Scene: waterfowl in waterscape.
Teal, drypoint etching/print	view	1925	7.9 in x 10.8 in (20.1 cm x 27.4 cm)		Scene: teals (likely Anatinae) in waterscape.
The Darkening Sky, drypoint etching on laid paper/print	view	1925	4.9 in x 6.8 in (12.4 cm x 17.3 cm)	Museum of Fine Arts, Boston, Boston, MA	Scene: waterfowl in flight in waterscape.
The Long Journey etching/print	view	1926	9.8 in x 11.8 in (24.9 cm x 30 cm)	Metropolitan Museum of Art, New York, NY; Museum of Fine Arts, Boston, Boston, MA; Frye Art Museum, Seattle, WA	Scene: waterscape with waterfowl in flight.
Canvasbacks, drypoint etching/print	view	1926	6 in x 11.8 in (15.2 cm x 30 cm)	Cleveland Museum of Art, Cleveland, OH; Museum of Fine Arts, Boston, Boston, MA	Scene: canvasbacks in flight.
The Sheldrake's Brood, drypoint etching/print		1926		Museum of Fine Arts, Boston, Boston, MA	Scene: shelducks.
Towering Widgeon, etching/print	view	1926	9.8 in x 7.8 in (24.9 cm x 19.8 cm)	Museum of Fine Arts, Boston, Boston, MA	Scene: wigeon in flight.
Currituck marshes, North Carolina, watercolor on paper	color image	1926	18.9 in x 26.4 in (48 cm x 67.1 cm)IAP 20493116	Museum of Fine Arts, Boston, Boston, MA	Scene: five American wigeons along water's edge; Currituck Marshes, NC.
Nightfall, drypoint etching on copper plate/print		1926	6 in x 8 in (15.2 cm x 20.3 cm)	Museum of Fine Arts, Boston, Boston, MA	
Ipswich Marshes, drypoint etching on copper plate/print	view	1926	7.9 in x 10 in (20.1 cm x 25.4 cm)	Wichita Art Museum, Wichita, KS; Museum of Fine Arts, Boston, Boston, MA; Herbert F. Johnson Museum of Art, Cornell University, Ithaca, NY	Scene: waterfowl in flight over Ipswich River, Massachusetts.
In Dropping Flight, drypoint etching on zinc plate/print	view	1926	10.9 in x 13.8 in (27.7 cm x 35.1 cm)	Museum of Fine Arts, Boston, Boston, MA; Herbert F. Johnson Museum of Art, Cornell University, Ithaca, NY	Scene: wildfowl coming in to land in body of water.
Over Currituck Marshes, drypoint etching on laid paper/print	view	1926	11.5 in x 15.6 in (29.2 cm x 39.6 cm) or 7.1 in x 11.8 in (18 cm x 30 cm)	Museum of Fine Arts, Boston, Boston, MA; Frye Art Museum, Seattle, WA	Scene: waterfowl in flight.
Alighting in the Moonlight, oil on masonite	color image	1927	14 in x 21.9 in (35.6 cm x 55.6 cm)		
Mallards at Evening, drypoint etching/print	view	c. 1927	13.9 in x 11.9 in (35.3 cm x 30.2 cm)	Indianapolis Museum of Art, Indianapolis, IN; Herbert F. Johnson Museum of Art, Cornell University, Ithaca, NY	Scene: waterfowl (mallards) landing on pond in evening light.
Rainbow Cove, etching on laid paper/print	view	1927	11.8 in x 12.4 in (30 cm x 31.5 cm) or 7.8 in x 9.8 in (19.8 cm x 24.9 cm)	Cleveland Museum of Art, Cleveland, OH; Museum of Fine Arts, Boston, Boston, MA; Frye Art Museum, Seattle, WA; Mead Art Museum, Amherst College, Amherst, MA	Scene: waterfowl in waterscape.
Swinging In, drypoint etching on wove paper	view view	1927	7.8 in x 11.8 in (19.8 cm x 30 cm)	Wichita Art Museum, Wichita, KS; Mead Art Museum, Amherst College, Amherst, MA	Scene: waterscape with waterfowl.
On Set Wings, etching/print	view	1927	4.4 in x 5.8 in (11.2 cm x 14.7 cm)	Mead Art Museum, Amherst College, Amherst, MA	Scene: wildfowl in flight.
The White Heron, etching/print	view	1927	11 in x 7 in (27.9 cm x 17.8 cm)		
The Passing Flock, etching on laid paper/print	view	1927	11.8 in x 13.8 in (30 cm x 35.1 cm)		Scene: wildfowl in waterscape.
Redhead Alighting, drypoint etching/print	view	1927	5 in x 6 in (12.7 cm x 15.2 cm)		Scene: lone redhead landing in body of water.
Evening Flight, etching on laid paper	view	1927	7.8 in x 9.9 in (19.8 cm x 25.1 cm)		Scene: wildfowl in flight in waterscape.
On Swift Wings, etching/print	view	c. 1927	11.8 in x 9.8 in (30 cm x 24.9 cm)	Museum of Fine Arts, Boston, Boston, MA	Scene: waterfowl on the wing in waterscape.
Black Ducks, etching/print	view	1927	9.9 in x 12.5 in (25.1 cm x 31.8 cm)		Scene: ducks (3) floating in waterscape.
Hawk and Mallard, etching/lithograph	view	1927	12.6 in x 9.5 in (32 cm x 24.1 cm)		Scene: hawk flies after mallard.
Yellowlegs, No. 4, drypoint etching/print	view	c. 1928	7.9 in x 9.8 in (20.1 cm x 24.9 cm)	Museum of Fine Arts, Boston, Boston, MA	Scene: yellowleg (likely Tringa).
Lone Yellowlegs, drypoint etching/print	view	1928	12 in x 8 in (30.5 cm x 20.3 cm) or 16 in x 10.5 in (40.6 cm x 26.7 cm)IAP 46470006	Carnegie Museum of Art, Pittsburgh, PA	Scene: lone yellowlegs (likely Tringas) in waterscape.
Yellowlegs in Sunlight, drypoint etching on laid paper/print	view	1928	9.8 in x 7.9 in (24.9 cm x 20.1 cm)	Pennsylvania Academy of the Fine Arts, Philadelphia, PA; Cleveland Museum of Art, Cleveland, OH	Scene: yellowlegs (likely Tringas).
Yellowlegs at Dusk, etching on laid paper/print	view	1928	11.5 in x 16.3 in (29.2 cm x 41.4 cm) or 8 in x 11 in (20.3 cm x 27.9 cm)	Frye Art Museum, Seattle, WA	Scene: yellowlegs (likely Tringas).
Dawn, etching/print	view	1928	7.9 in x 9.8 in (20.1 cm x 24.9 cm)	Chrysler Museum of Art, Norfolk, VA	Scene: waterfowl (9) coming in to land on body of water.
Here They Come!, drypoint etching/print	view	1928	13.8 in x 11.6 in (35.1 cm x 29.5 cm)	Cleveland Museum of Art, Cleveland, OH	Scene: waterfowl arriving in a waterscape.
Canada Geese Taking Flight, painting	view	1929			Scene: Canada geese taking flight in waterscape.
White Herons, oil on canvas		1929	40 in x 32.3 in (101.6 cm x 82 cm) IAP 8A220036		Scene: herons (3) wading in lake amidst lily pads; two herons at left look right (one stands taller; second one's neck is swooped down); heron at right faces left with beak pointing toward water.
White Herons, watercolor on paper		1929	29 in x 21 in (73.7 cm x 53.3 cm) IAP 28110007; IAP 88740048; IAP 89170020		Scene: herons (3) wading in lake; heron in foreground faces right; two standing further back face left.
Geese Drifting Down, etching/print	view	1929	9.1 in x 14 in (23.1 cm x 35.6 cm)		Scene: Canada geese landing in waterscape.
Ducks in a Marsh, ink wash on paper	view	1930	9.4 in x 13.6 in (23.9 cm x 34.5 cm)		Scene: ducks in waterscape.
Greater Yellowlegs, drypoint etching/print	view	1930		Cleveland Museum of Art, Cleveland, OH	Scene: yellowlegs (likely Tringas).
Lone Pintail, drypoint etching/print	view	1930	4.5 in x 6 in (11.4 cm x 15.2 cm)	Museum of Fine Arts, Boston, Boston, MA	Scene: pintail (likely northern pintails).
Pair of Pintails, drypoint etching/print	view	1930	7.9 in x 9.9 in (20.1 cm x 25.1 cm)	Cleveland Museum of Art, Cleveland, OH; Herbert F. Johnson Museum of Art, Cornell University, Ithaca, NY	Scene: pintails (likely northern pintails).
Redheads Coming, etching/print	view	1930	8 in x 15 in (20.3 cm x 38.1 cm)	Metropolitan Museum of Art, New York, NY; Museum of Fine Arts, Boston, Boston, MA	Scene: waterfowl (redheads) landing in waterscape.
Canada Geese in the Snow, watercolor/graphite on paper	color image	1930	18.5 in x 23.5 in (47 cm x 59.7 cm)		Scene: Canada geese in snowscape.
Startled Ducks etching on laid paper/print	view	1930	7.9 in x 5.9 in (20.1 cm x 15 cm)		Scene: ducks in waterscape.
Two Black Ducks, drypoint etching on laid paper/print	view view	1930	15 in x 12 in (38.1 cm x 30.5 cm)	Frye Art Museum, Seattle, WA; Mead Art Museum, Amherst College, Amherst, MA	Scene: ducks in waterscape.
Chickadee, drypoint etching	view	1930	5.8 in x 3.8 in (14.7 cm x 9.7 cm)		Scene: chickadee.
Waders, drypoint etching/print	view view	c. 1930	7 in x 12 in (17.8 cm x 30.5 cm)	Mead Art Museum, Amherst College, Amherst, MA	Scene: waterfowl on edge of water.
Woodcock, drypoint etching/print	view view	1930	11.8 in x 9.8 in (30 cm x 24.9 cm)	Achenbach Foundation for Graphic Arts, California Palace of the Legion of Honor, San Francisco, CA; Museum of Fine Arts, Boston, Boston, MA; Mead Art Museum, Amherst College, Amherst, MA; Herbert F. Johnson Museum of Art, Cornell University, Ithaca, NY	Scene: woodcock.
Quail, etching/print	view	1930	6 in x 4.5 in (15.2 cm x 11.4 cm)		Scene: quail in brush.
Springing Teal, drypoint etching/print	view view	1930	14.8 in x 10.5 in (37.6 cm x 26.7 cm)		Scene: lone teal (likely Anatinae) in waterscape.
Bunch of Bluebills (or Six Blue Bills), pencil/drypoint etching/print	view	1931	3.8 in x 5 in (9.7 cm x 12.7 cm)	Mead Art Museum, Amherst College, Amherst, MA	Scene: waterfowl (likely greater scaups) in flight.
Two Black Geese, etching, ink on pencil	view	1931		Indianapolis Museum of Art, Indianapolis, IN	
Swans at Moonlight, watercolor on paper		1931	19.5 in x 28 in (49.5 cm x 71.1 cm) IAP 89170039	Cleveland Museum of Art, Cleveland, OH	Scene: group of swans flying over marsh in moonlight.
November Moon, etching with aquatint	view	1931	10 in x 8 in (25.4 cm x 20.3 cm)		Scene: waterfowl flying in moonlit waterscape.
Rain Squall, etching/print	view	1931	7 in x 8.8 in (17.8 cm x 22.4 cm)		Scene: waterfowl in rainy waterscape.
Blue Herons, etching/lithograph	view	1931	9.5 in x 13 in (24.1 cm x 33 cm)	Herbert F. Johnson Museum of Art, Cornell University, Ithaca, NY	Scene: herons in flight in waterscape.
Four Mallards, etching/lithograph	view	1931	11.4 in x 13.8 in (29 cm x 35.1 cm)		Scene: mallards (4) in flight in waterscape.
Yellowlegs, etching/print	view	1931	11 in x 9 in (27.9 cm x 22.9 cm)	Herbert F. Johnson Museum of Art, Cornell University, Ithaca, NY	Scene: lone yellowlegs (likely Tringas) reflected in water of marsh.
Three Geese, etching/lithograph	view	1931	9.5 in x 13 in (24.1 cm x 33 cm)		Scene: Canada geese (3) in flight in waterscape.
Flock of Geese in Flight, watercolor on paper	color image	1932	18.6 in x 26.6 in (47.2 cm x 67.6 cm)		Scene: Canada geese in flight.
Sanctuary, etching/print	view	1932	7 in x 9.1 in (17.8 cm x 23.1 cm)		Scene: wildfowl in waterscape.
Pair of Snipe, etching/print	view	1932	3.8 in x 5.8 in (9.7 cm x 14.7 cm)		Scene: wading snipe.
Pintails Passing, drypoint etching/print	view	c. 1932	15 in x 9.8 in (38.1 cm x 24.9 cm)	Cleveland Museum of Art, Cleveland, OH; Museum of Fine Arts, Boston, Boston, MA	Scene: pintails (likely northern pintails).
The Sandpiper, etching/print	view	1932			Scene: lone sandpiper standing in shallow water.
Great White Herons, oil on canvas		1933	44 in x 36.1 in (111.8 cm x 91.7 cm) IAP 46120954	Rhode Island School of Design Museum, Providence, RI	Scene: sunny landscape with three white herons lifting off from marshy pond dotted with lily pads and lined with tall grass. Birds, like the great white herons, were among Benson's favorite subjects. In this painting he displays a talent for composition and knowledge of birds. Each bird is depicted in a different stage of flight.
Sunset at Long Point, graphite etching/print	view	1933	10.2 in x 8.1 in (25.9 cm x 20.6 cm)	Museum of Fine Arts, Boston, Boston, MA	Scene: wildfowl in waterscape.
Eagle Alighting, drypoint etching/print	view	1933	9.5 in x 6.2 in (24.1 cm x 15.7 cm)		
A Northwest Day, oil on canvas	color image	1934	36 in x 44 in (91.4 cm x 111.8 cm)		Scene: Canada geese in flight over waterscape.
Grouse on a Pine Bough, watercolor	color image	1934			Scene: grouse.
Three Geese, etching, ink on paper	view	1936		Indianapolis Museum of Art, Indianapolis, IN	Scene: Canada geese (3) in flight in waterscape.
Tired Geese, etching on wove paper/print	view view	1936	5.9 in x 8.1 in (15 cm x 20.6 cm)	California Palace of the Legion of Honor, San Francisco, CA; Mead Art Museum, Amherst College, Amherst, MA; Addison Gallery of American Art, Phillips Academy, Andover, MA	Scene: waterfowl landing in waterscape.
Heron Roost, etching/print	view	1937		Cleveland Museum of Art, Cleveland, OH	
Cold Sunset, oil on canvas	color image	1938			Scene: frosty hues of blue/white/gray offer backdrop for mallards in marsh.
Ducks at Dawn, oil on canvas		1940	28.5 in x 35 in (72.4 cm x 88.9 cm) IAP 85190001	Private collection	Scene: ducks (4) flying over marshy river under lightening sky.
Ducks at Dawn, watercolor		1940		Private collection	Benson often painted wildfowl early in the morning or at dusk.
Flight of Swans, oil on canvas	color image	1940	30.5 in x 39.5 in (77.5 cm x 100.3 cm)IAP 89170111		Scene: group of swans fly above marsh waterscape.
Early Morning, watercolor and graphite on wove paper	view	1940	14.4 in x 20.4 in (36.6 cm x 51.8 cm)	Metropolitan Museum of Art, New York, NY	Scene: ducks in waterscape.
Ducks with Purple Sky (or Ducks in Flight), watercolor on paper	color image	1941	14 in x 12 in (35.6 cm x 30.5 cm) or 15 in x 19 in (38.1 cm x 48.3 cm)IAP 8A220012		
Flying Geese, etching/print			33 in x 28 in (83.8 cm x 71.1 cm)		Scene: geese coming in for landing in body of water.
Geese in Flight, etching/print			25.4 in x 38.1 in (64.5 cm x 96.8 cm)		Scene: geese in flight.
Mallard and Landscape					Scene: pond landscape with one mallard.
Chickadees, watercolor on paper			14.3 in x 17 in (36.3 cm x 43.2 cm) IAP 60630324	Vose Galleries, Boston, MA	Scene: chickadees.
Wintry Marshes, watercolor on paper	view				
'Untitled (or Seven Ducks in Pond), etching	view		12.1 in x 14.3 in (30.7 cm x 36.3 cm)	Chazen Museum of Art, University of Wisconsin-Madison, Madison, WI	Scene: pond with ducks (7).
'Untitled (or Two Ducks), etching	view		14.4 in x 11 in (36.6 cm x 27.9 cm)	Chazen Museum of Art, University of Wisconsin-Madison, Madison, WI	Scene: pond landscape with ducks (2).
Shelldrake's Brood, drypoint etching	search collection		11.2 in x 14.7 in (28.4 cm x 37.3 cm)	Achenbach Foundation for Graphic Arts, California Palace of the Legion of Honor, San Francisco, CA	Scene: shelducks.
Yellow No. 3, etching	search collection		20.1 in x 14.9 in (51.1 cm x 37.8 cm)	California Palace of the Legion of Honor, San Francisco, CA	
Mallards Alighting, watercolor and graphite on wove paper	view		13 in x 16.1 in (33 cm x 40.9 cm)	Metropolitan Museum of Art, New York, NY	Scene: three mallards coming in to land on body of water.
Ducks in Calm water, watercolor and graphite on wove paper	view		14.9 in x 20 in (37.8 cm x 50.8 cm)	Metropolitan Museum of Art, New York, NY	Scene: ducks in calm body of water.
Eiders in Flight, watercolor on paper (en grisaille)	view		20 in x 27 in (50.8 cm x 68.6 cm)		Scene: eiders in flight.
Ducks in the Rain, etching/print				Museum of Fine Arts, Boston, Boston, MA	Scene: ducks in waterscape.
Goose and Three Ducks, etching/print				Museum of Fine Arts, Boston, Boston, MA	Scene: waterfowl in waterscape.
Chickadee, drypoint etching on laid paper/print			12.6 in x 9.4 in (32 cm x 23.9 cm)	Museum of Fine Arts, Boston, Boston, MA; Frye Art Museum, Seattle, WA	Scene: chickadee.
Eiders Landing/A Nature Sketch, watercolor/gouache on paper	color image		9.3 in x 18 in (23.6 cm x 45.7 cm)		Scene: eiders.
Geese against Sky, etching/print					
In Flight, print	search collection		4 in x 5.9 in (10.2 cm x 15 cm)		
Hovering Geese, aquatint on paper	view		14 in x 10.9 in (35.6 cm x 27.7 cm)	Art Institute of Chicago, Chicago, IL	Scene: Canada geese in flight over waterscape.
Turnstones, etching/print	view		7.8 in x 11.8 in (19.8 cm x 30 cm)	Mead Art Museum, Amherst College, Amherst, MA	Scene: turnstones standing on dunes.
Eider, ink wash/print	view				Scene: eiders floating in body of water.
Herons, etching/print	view		6.8 in x 10.8 in (17.3 cm x 27.4 cm)		Scene: waterfowl standing in waterscape.
Canada Geese In Flight, painting	color image				Scene: Canada geese in flight over choppy waves.
Flying Pintails, painting	color image				Scene: pintails (likely northern pintails) in flight in waterscape.
Migrating Scoters, watercolor on paper	color image		14 in x 19 in (35.6 cm x 48.3 cm)		Scene: scoters in flight over choppy water.
Swans, inkwash	view		24 in x 18 in (61 cm x 45.7 cm)		Scene: swans.
Black Ducks, watercolor on paper	color image		18.5 in x 23 in (47 cm x 58.4 cm)		Scene: ducks in waterscape.
Eiders at Play, watercolor on paper	view		13 in x 26 in (33 cm x 66 cm)		Scene: eiders afloat in waterscape.

== Bibliography ==
- Bedford, F. "Benson Biography 2". Faith Andrews Bedford. Archived from the original on 2012-03-25.
- Bedford, F (2000). The sporting art of Frank W. Benson. Jaffrey, NH: David R. Godine. ISBN 1-56792-111-6.
- Benson, F.; Paff, A. (1917). Etchings and Drypoints by Frank W. Benson. Boston and New York: Houghton Mifflin Company.
- Benson, F.; Paff, A. (1919). Etchings and Drypoints by Frank W. Benson. Boston and New York: Houghton Mifflin Company.
- Chambers, B. "Frank W. Benson, Red and Gold". Butler Institute of American Art. Archived from the original on 2011-09-27.
- "Frank W. Benson, American Impressionist, Exhibition". Peabody Essex Museum. Archived from the original on 2011-07-25.
- "Frank W. Benson, American Impressionist, Interactive presentation, Gallery". Peabody Essex Museum. Archived from the original on 2011-07-25.
- "Frank W. Benson, American Impressionist, Interactive presentation, Timeline". Peabody Essex Museum. Archived from the original on 2011-07-25.
- "Frank W. Benson, Collection". Boston Museum of Art.
- "Frank W. Benson, Collection". Cleveland Museum of Art, Ohio.
- "Frank W. Benson, Collection". National of Art, Washington D.C.
- "Frank W. Benson, Collection". University of New Hampshire.
- "Frank Weston Benson, Collection". The Art Institute of Chicago. Art Institute of Chicago.
- "Portrait of My Daughters". Worcester Art Museum.
- The Sisters, Terra Foundation for American Art
- "Summer". Rhode Island School of Design Museum. Archived from the original on 2011-06-10.
- "Smithsonian Institution Research Information System (SIRIS)". Smithsonian Institution.
- "Sunlight". Indianapolis Museum of Art.
