= List of landscapes by Frank Weston Benson =

Landscapes by Frank Weston Benson are one of the types of art work made by Frank Weston Benson. He also made portraits, waterscapes, wildlife, interiors and other works of art.

In 1888 Benson married Ellen Perry Peirson. Together they had four children: Eleanor (born 1890), George (born 1891), Elisabeth (born 1892) and Sylvia (born 1898). The Benson family spent 7 summers starting in 1893 in Newcastle, New Hampshire. Starting 1901 the Benson family stayed at Wooster Farm on New Haven Island on Penobscot Bay in Maine and in 1906 they bought the property. Benson enjoyed creating idyllic paintings of his family out of doors at their summer home in New Haven, Maine. One daughter noted that "Papa would often have us put on our best white dresses and then ask us to sit in the grass or play in the woods. We thought it was so silly and the maids made such a fuss when they saw the clothes afterwards."

Just at the turn of the century, Benson made Impressionist paintings of his children, Eleanor, Elisabeth, George and Sylvia at their summer home on New Haven Island in Maine. His work was well received by critics and collectors and won awards. Benson, eager to paint his children on sunny days, often asked his daughters to don their best white dresses and sit in the grass or play in the woods.

Between 1890 and 1898 Benson produced many en plein air landscape and seascape paintings of New Hampshire, including the Mount Monadnock, New Castle and Portsmouth regions.

== Works ==
Title	Image	Medium	Year	Collection	Comments and SIRIS ID (Note: The SIRIS Control Number is assigned for a given work of art in the Smithsonian Institution Research Information System. It can be used to search the SIRIS system and access the specific work of art.)
Landscape			1890–1898		
Mount Monadnock		oil on canvas	c. 1890		24 in x 30 in (61 cm x 76.2 cm) Scene: Mount Monadnock, NH.
Mount Monadnock		oil on canvas	c. 1890		16 in x 20 in (40.6 cm x 50.8 cm) Scene: Mount Monadnock, NH. SIRIS Control Number 89170057
View in Mexico near Santiago	Online image	oil on canvas	1898		5.5 in x 10 in (14 cm x 25.4 cm)
Benson Family at Wooster Farm			1901	Chazen Museum of Art, University of Wisconsin-Madison, Madison, WI	24.9 in x 29.9 in (63.2 cm x 75.9 cm). Scene: artist's family at Wooster Farm, North Haven, ME.
Evening Light		oil on canvas	1908	Cleveland Museum of Art, Cleveland, OH	25.3 in x 30.5 in (64.3 cm x 77.5 cm) Benson's wife, Ellen, and four children walk across a meadow in the painting Evening Light. Eleanor waits on the left for her mother and other children to walk towards her. George has a fishing pole carried over his shoulder. SIRIS Control Number 89170043
The House at North Haven (or Wooster Farm) (or The Farm at North Haven)	Online image		1912		30.5 in x 49 in (77.5 cm x 124.5 cm) Scene: white farmhouse nestled in trees in middle-ground with seascape in distance. SIRIS Control Number 89170067
The High Carry		etching/prints	1915	Museum of Fine Arts, Boston, Boston, MA	9.9 in x 7.9 in (25.1 cm x 20.1 cm). Scene: 3 figures traveling in mountainous landscape; one figure is porting canoe.
The Hillside (or Reading in Sun and Shade)		oil on canvas	1921		25.1 in x 30.3 in (63.8 cm x 77 cm). Scene: landscape near coast with female figure reclining on grassy hillside, pink parasol held over her head as she reads; overhead are billowy clouds in clear blue sky; on left, glimpse of ocean. SIRIS Control Number 82190634
River Scene		oil on canvas	1921		Scene: river winds through countryside.
Cedars		watercolor, brush and blue	c. 1921	Museum of Fine Arts, Boston, MA	14.9 in x 21.6 in (37.8 cm x 54.9 cm)
Through the Willows			1922		
Iris and Lilies		watercolor on paper	1922		14.1 in x 20.6 in (35.8 cm x 52.3 cm) Scene: close-up of still pond water with lily pads and irises. Ellen, Benson's wife, planted water lilies and iris in a pond behind their summer home, Wooster Farm on North Haven Island, Maine, which was a frequent subject in Benson's paintings. SIRIS Control Number 8A730023
Meadows in Winter		watercolor on paper	1922	Museum of Fine Arts, Boston, MA	13.8 in x 19.7 in (35.1 cm x 50 cm) Scene: winter landscape with patches of tall grass poking through snow-covered meadow and small stream winding into distance. SIRIS Control Number 20493114
Through the Willows		watercolor over graphite on paper	1922	Art Institute of Chicago, Chicago, IL	16.2 in x 20.2 in (41.1 cm x 51.3 cm)
The Bridge	Online image	drypoint etching on copper plate/print	1923	Cleveland Museum of Art, Cleveland, OH; Westmoreland Museum of American Art, Greensburg, PA; Achenbach Foundation for Graphic Arts, California Palace of the Legion of Honor, San Francisco, CA; Museum of Fine Arts, Boston, Boston, MA	13.6 in x 10.7 in (34.5 cm x 27.2 cm)
Snowladen Spruce (or Snow-laden Spruce)	Online image	watercolor on paper	1927	Museum of Fine Arts, Boston, MA	20.1 in x 25.1 in (51.1 cm x 63.8 cm) Scene: snowscape. SIRIS Control Number 89170040
Wooster Farm	Online image	watercolor on paper	1927		15 in x 21.5 in (38.1 cm x 54.6 cm). Scene: close-up of front of house (artist's summer residence, North Haven, Maine) with bench's back facing viewer; trees at right. SIRIS Control Number 89170061
Dublin Woods	Online image	oil on canvas	1931		20 in x 17.9 in (50.8 cm x 45.5 cm)
Willow Trunks		watercolor, brush and blue	1933	Museum of Fine Arts, Boston, Boston, MA	20.1 in x 24.9 in (51.1 cm x 63.2 cm)
Woman in White Gazing over a Cliffside	Online image	oil on canvas			17 in x 13 in (43.2 cm x 33 cm) Scene: small female figure in cliffside landscape.
Amphitheater in the Park	Online image	watercolor on paper			6.3 in x 9 in (16 cm x 22.9 cm)
Mountain Sleet		drypoint etching/print			9.5 in x 11.7 in (24.1 cm x 29.7 cm)
Six Blue Hills		drypoint etching/print		Museum of Fine Arts, Boston, Boston, MA	
Young Girl Picking Flowers at Springtime	Online image	oil on board			

== Bibliography ==
- Bedford, F. "Benson Biography 2". Faith Andrews Bedford. Archived from the original on 2012-03-25.
- Bedford, F (2000). The sporting art of Frank W. Benson. Jaffrey, NH: David R. Godine. ISBN 1-56792-111-6.
- Benson, F.; Paff, A. (1917). Etchings and Drypoints by Frank W. Benson. Boston and New York: Houghton Mifflin Company.
- Benson, F.; Paff, A. (1919). Etchings and Drypoints by Frank W. Benson. Boston and New York: Houghton Mifflin Company.
- Chambers, B. "Frank W. Benson, Red and Gold". Butler Institute of American Art. Archived from the original on 2011-09-27.
- "Frank W. Benson, American Impressionist, Exhibition". Peabody Essex Museum. Archived from the original on 2011-07-25.
- "Frank W. Benson, American Impressionist, Interactive presentation, Gallery". Peabody Essex Museum. Archived from the original on 2011-07-25.
- "Frank W. Benson, American Impressionist, Interactive presentation, Timeline". Peabody Essex Museum. Archived from the original on 2011-07-25.
- "Frank W. Benson, Collection". Boston Museum of Art.
- "Frank W. Benson, Collection". Cleveland Museum of Art, Ohio.
- "Frank W. Benson, Collection". National of Art, Washington D.C.
- "Frank W. Benson, Collection". University of New Hampshire.
- "Frank Weston Benson, Collection". Art Institute of Chicago.
- "Portrait of My Daughters". Worcester Art Museum.
- The Sisters, Terra Foundation for American Art
- "Summer". Rhode Island School of Design Museum. Archived from the original on 2011-06-10.
- "Smithsonian Institution Research Information System (SIRIS)". Smithsonian Institution.
- "Sunlight". Indianapolis Museum of Art.
