= List of murals by Frank Weston Benson =

Frank Weston Benson made Murals as well as portraits, waterscapes, wildlife, landscapes and other works of art.

Benson was commissioned by the Library of Congress of the United States in the 1890s; he completed murals of the Four Seasons and Three Graces for the project.

== Murals ==
Title	Image	Year	Collection	Comments and SIRIS ID (Note: The SIRIS Control Number is assigned for a given work of art in the Smithsonian Institution Research Information System. It can be used to search the SIRIS system and access the specific work of art.)
Aglaia (or The Graces: Aglaia), mural		1896	Library of Congress, Washington, DC	Subject: Aglaia, patroness of Husbandry, seated in landscape, holding shepherd's crook. SIRIS Control Number 08480647.
Euphrosyne (or The Graces: Euphrosyne), mural		1896	Library of Congress, Washington, DC	Subject: Euphrosyne, patroness of Beauty, seated in landscape, looking at herself in hand mirror. SIRIS Control Number 08480649
Thalia (or The Graces: Thalia), mural		1896 08480648	Library of Congress, Washington, DC	Subject: Thalia, patroness of Music, seated in landscape, holding lyre.
The Four Seasons, mural		1896	Library of Congress, Washington, DC	
Sketch for a Mural, oil on canvas		c. 1890		Dimensions: 32.9 in x 40.1 in (83.6 cm x 101.9 cm). SIRIS Control Number 62641460

== Bibliography ==
- "Smithsonian Institution Research Information System (SIRIS)". Smithsonian Institution.
- "Sunlight". Indianapolis Museum of Art.
- "Benson, Frank W. Smithsonian Institution Research Information System (SIRIS) - Search Engine".
