= List of interiors and still lifes by Frank Weston Benson =

Interiors and still lifes by Frank Weston Benson includes oil and watercolor paintings and a couple of etchings made by Frank Weston Benson. He also made portraits, waterscapes, wildlife, landscapes, and other works of art.

While Benson's works of interior settings and still lifes were limited in comparison to other compositions or settings, he exhibited expertise at capturing light and shadow of interior spaces.

Benson painted a series of true still lifes about 1919. In these arrangements, he gathered objects from his seafaring ancestors' trips to the Orient: porcelain, candlesticks, oriental screens, and embroidered silk tablecloths. He arranged and rearranged them to create interesting compositions. Whatever the subject matter, Benson always sought a "harmonious arrangement." He said to his daughter Eleanor, "A picture is merely an experiment in design. If the design is pleasing, the picture is good, no matter whether composed of objects, still life, figures or birds. Few appreciate that what makes them admire a picture is the design made by the painter."

After a day of hunting, Benson brought home a rail and snipe and hammered them to the barn door. He found that he was interested in capturing the two birds and made oil paintings of each. Although he was a teenager, he had an exceptional grasp of light and its effects. Rail, one of Benson's earliest paintings, was made when he was 16 and his goal was to become an ornithological illustrator.

In Firelight, Benson depicts a woman wearing a white dress in an interior setting. Her left arm is outstretched and to the right is a large vase. It won an award with a cash prize that allowed Benson to realize a lifelong dream, a hunting cabin, which he purchased with two of his brothers-in-law.

== Works ==
Title	Image	Medium	Year	Collection	Comments and SIRIS ID (Note: The SIRIS Control Number is assigned for a given work of art in the Smithsonian Institution Research Information System. It can be used to search the SIRIS system and access the specific work of art.)
Rail		oil on board	1878–1879	Private collection	18 in x 12.3 in (45.7 cm x 31.2 cm), SIRIS Control Number 8A220023
By Firelight		oil on canvas	1889		40 in x 31 in (101.6 cm x 78.7 cm). Scene: Red interior with woman seated in dark on chair in front of lit fireplace. SIRIS Control Number 23570017
Firelight		oil on canvas	1893	Berry-Hill Galleries, Inc., New York	40 in x 30 in (101.6 cm x 76.2 cm) SIRIS Control Number 89170058
Examining the Lace (or Woman Admiring Lace)		oil on canvas	1910		30 in x 25 in (76.2 cm x 63.5 cm) Scene: interior with female figure seated in armchair, facing viewer, holding piece of lace; fireplace at right. SIRIS Control Number 89180001
Figure in a Room (or Interior?)		oil on canvas	1912	Peabody Essex Museum, Salem, MA	30 in x 25.1 in (76.2 cm x 63.8 cm). Benson received the statue of Artemis depicted in Figure in a Room from his friend, Bela Pratt, who was an instructor with Benson at the School of the Museum of Fine Arts, Boston. SIRIS Control Number 07130294
The Grey Room (or Grey Room (or The Gray Room)		oil on canvas	1913		25.3 in x 30.8 in (64.3 cm x 78.2 cm) Scene: dark interior with woman reading by yellow glow. SIRIS Control Number 13730490
The Seamstress		oil on canvas	1913		36 in x 26 in (91.4 cm x 66 cm) Scene: dark interior with woman sewing by light from window.
Candlelight		etching on Shogun paper/print	1915	Museum of Fine Arts, Boston, MA; Mead Art Museum, Amherst College, Amherst, MA	9.9 in x 7.9 in (25.1 cm x 20.1 cm) Scene: female figure fixes hair in mirror by candlelight.
Nasturtiums in a Vase			1919		Nasturtiums in a Vase is one of the more than thirty still lifes Benson completed in oil and watercolor.
The Dining Room Table		oil on canvas	c. 1919	Westmoreland Museum of American Art, Greensburg, PA	32.1 in x 39.9 in (81.5 cm x 101.3 cm) Scene: still life with a parrot perched on a bowl of fruit. SIRIS Control Number 29830008
The Silver Screen		oil on canvas	1921	Museum of Fine Arts, Boston, Boston, MA	36.3 in x 44.1 in (92.2 cm x 112 cm) Of painting interior spaces and still lifes, such as The Silver Screen, Benson said, "Don't paint things... Don't paint anything but the effect of light." SIRIS Control Number 20492455
Still Life Decoration		oil on canvas tacked over board	1922		45 in x 60 in (114.3 cm x 152.4 cm) Scene: still life with bowl of fruit, statuary, and candlestick on cloth-draped table in front of silver screen. SIRIS Control Number 89170076
Still Life with Flowers		watercolor on paper	1922		19 in x 15 in (48.3 cm x 38.1 cm) Scene: still life of clear pitcher with flowers.
Pewter Pitcher	Online image	watercolor/gouache/graphite on paper laid down on board	1923	Art Institute of Chicago, Chicago, IL	21 in x 14.4 in (53.3 cm x 36.6 cm) Scene: arrangement of pewter pitcher of flowers and plates.
Peonies in Blue China	Online image	watercolor on paper	1923	Private collection	25 in x 19 in (63.5 cm x 48.3 cm) Scene: light-colored flowers in blue/white porcelain jug set against floral wallpaper background; red/pink flowers at left. SIRIS Control Number 8A220007
The Waterlilies (or The Water Lilies)	Online image	watercolor on paper	1923		17 in x 21 in (43.2 cm x 53.3 cm)
Nasturtiums in a Flowered Vase (or Nasturtiums in a Vase)		watercolor on paper	c. 1926		21.8 in x 17.6 in (55.4 cm x 44.7 cm) Nasturtiums in a Vase in one of the more than thirty still lifes Benson completed in oil and watercolor. SIRIS Control Number 61070671
Still Life	Online image	oil on canvas	c. 1926	Terra Foundation for American Art, Chicago, IL	45.3 in x 60.3 in (115.1 cm x 153.2 cm) Still life: several objects on table; porcelain bowl with fruit, vase of flowers, candlesticks, bird. Benson choose and varied placement of items in his collection to create interesting and harmonious compositions. The silver screen used in this painting was also used in the painting The Silver Screen at the Museum of Fine Arts, Boston. Still Life was winner of the "Henry Ward Ranger Fund prize." SIRIS Control Number 08580001
Still Life	Online image	etching/lithograph	1927		15.1 in x 12 in (38.4 cm x 30.5 cm) Scene: still life with flowers in jug next to small pewter pitcher.
Fisherman's Bedroom, Eastham, Massachusetts	Online image	watercolor on paper	c. 1929	Museum of Fine Arts, Boston, Boston, MA	16.8 in x 22 in (42.7 cm x 55.9 cm) Scene: interior depicting unmade bed with rumpled brown blanket/white sheets; bedside table with oil lamp/hat/necktie. SIRIS Control Number 20493118
Still Life, Azaleas	Online image	watercolor on paper	1934	Stephen Phillips Memorial Trust House, Salem, MA	21 in x 28 in (53.3 cm x 71.1 cm) Still life: oriental figurine of woman in red robes and 2 pots of azaleas with pink blossoms on patterned cloth set in an interior. Mrs. Stephen Phillips, a new neighbor, visited Benson's Chestnut Street, Salem home for tea. She mentioned that she enjoyed the painting and Benson gave it to her as a gift. SIRIS Control Number 8A220009
Still Life	Online image	oil on canvas	1936		30 in x 50 in (76.2 cm x 127 cm) Still life: several objects on table; bowls/platters with fruit, pitcher of water/liquid, candlesticks. SIRIS Control Number 89170026
Candelight	Online image	etching		Achenbach Foundation for Graphic Arts, California Palace of the Legion of Honor, San Francisco, CA	25.1 in x 20 in (63.8 cm x 50.8 cm)

== Bibliography ==
- Bedford, F. "A biography of Benson titled Frank W. Benson: American Impressionist 2". Faith Andrews Bedford. Archived from the original on 2012-03-25.
- Bedford, F (2000). The sporting art of Frank W. Benson. Jaffrey, NH: David R. Godine. ISBN 1-56792-111-6.
- "Frank W. Benson, American Impressionist, Exhibition". Peabody Essex Museum. Archived from the original on 2011-07-25.
- "Frank W. Benson, American Impressionist, Interactive presentation, Gallery". Peabody Essex Museum. Archived from the original on 2011-07-25.
- "Frank W. Benson, American Impressionist, Interactive presentation, Timeline". Peabody Essex Museum. Archived from the original on 2011-07-25.
- "Smithsonian Institution Research Information System (SIRIS)". Smithsonian Institution.
- "Benson, Frank W. Smithsonian Institution Research Information System (SIRIS) - Search Engine".
