= Frye Art Museum =

Art museum in Seattle

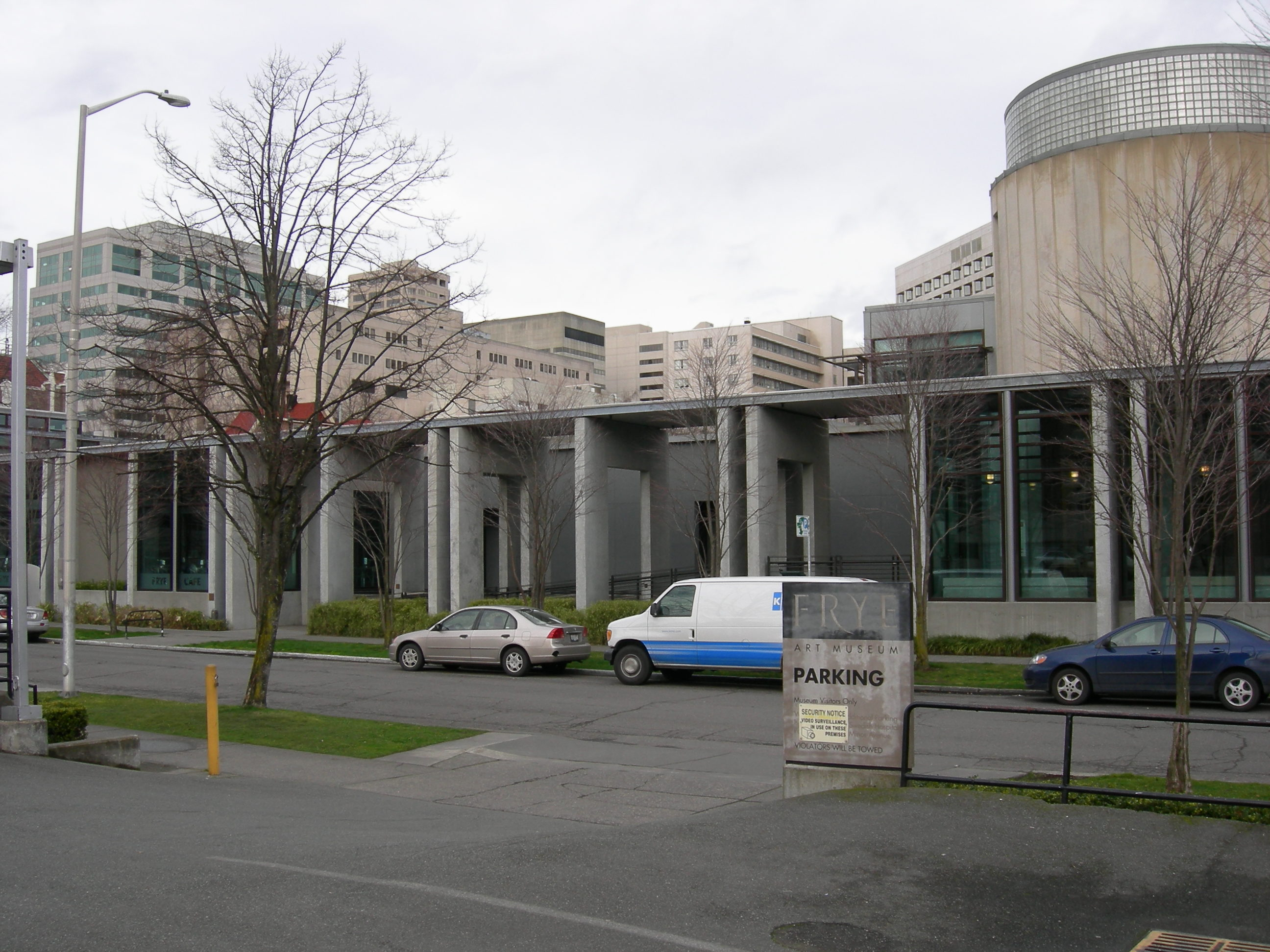
- The Frye Art Museum (2007)
- Established: 1952
- Location: 704 Terry Avenue; Seattle, WA 98104 (United States)
- Coordinates: 47.6071°N 122.3242°W
- Type: Art
- Collections: Modern and Contemporary art
- Founders: Charles and Emma Frye
- Director: Jamilee Lacy
- Architects: Paul Thiry (1952) original; Rick Sundberg of Olson Sundberg Kundig Allen Architects – (1997) remodel
- Public transit access: LINK light rail Pioneer Square station
- Website: fryemuseum.org

The Frye Art Museum is a modern and contemporary art museum in the First Hill neighborhood of Seattle, Washington. It was founded in 1952 to house the collection of Charles and Emma Frye and has since grown to include rotating temporary exhibitions of emerging and contemporary artists.

== History ==
The museum emphasizes painting and sculpture from the nineteenth century to the present. Its holdings originated from the private collection of Charles H. Frye (1858–1940) and Emma Lamp Frye (d. 1934). The Fryes' were first-generation Americans of German descent who collected primarily German and Austrian artwork, often purchased directly from studios in Munich.

Charles Frye was the owner of a local meatpacking plant in Seattle. He set aside money in his will for a museum to house the Fryes' collection of 232 paintings. The Fryes' collection was first offered to the Seattle Art Museum but it was declined due to restrictions stipulated in the will which specified that the artwork must be on permanent display, be shown under natural light, not be shown with abstract work, and that admission to view the works remain free of charge. After Charles and Emma Frye had both died and following the sale of their home in 1941, many of their collected paintings, overseen by Walser Greathouse, were moved to the meat plant on Airport Way in SoDo, Seattle. The stored artwork survived a major fire at the plant on Feb. 18, 1943, following the crash of a B-29 bomber prototype, then a top-secret military project.

The Frye Art Museum was built in Seattle's First Hill neighborhood and opened to the public in 1952 as a free art museum.

The Fryes' historic collection consisted of representational art works, with a tendency toward "the dark, the dramatic, and the psychological" rather than "the genteel". The museum's permanent collection reflects Charles Frye's relatively conservative artistic tastes, and initially, the museum continued to be dedicated to representational art, both in its acquisitions and its exhibits. This conservatism reflected the artistic and social values of its first director, Walser Greathouse (d. 1966) and of his widow and successor Ida Kay Greathouse, who ran the museum until 1993.

After 2007 the artwork presented and collected by the museum shifted, contrary to the restrictions stipulated in Charles Frye's will, to include more contemporary forms such as Conceptual Art, eliciting comparisons to Seattle's Henry Art Gallery.

== Architecture ==
The building for the Frye Art Museum was originally designed by architect Paul Thiry. In the mid 1990s the museum was expanded and renovated by architect Rick Sundberg of Olson Sundberg Kundig Allen Architects. The museum added a 142-seat auditorium and an education studio as part of the renovation.

== Exhibitions and programs ==
Exhibitions have included "Subspontaneous: Francesca Lohmann and Rob Rhee," featuring sculptures involving natural forces and ecological growth, "Agnieszka Polska: Love Bite," and "Unsettling Femininity: Selections from the Frye Art Museum Collection." The museum often redeploys its permanent collection, experimenting with exhibiting it in different arrangements. In 2018, the museum had 109,249 total attendees and a membership base of 2,383.

Contemporary artists and groups exhibited at The Frye have included the performance group Degenerate Art Ensemble, First Nations indigenous artist Duane Linklater, American painter Christina Quarles, and African-American filmmaker and multimedia artist Cauleen Smith.

In 2020, amid the COVID-19 pandemic, the museum temporarily closed for in-person visits and provided online art viewing and educational opportunities through the Frye From Home program. On August 28, 2020, the museum announced its expectation to reopen for in-person visits in October 2020.

== Collection ==
The Frye Art Museum's collection highlights many kinds of paintings, prints, works on paper, and sculptures. Artists represented in the museum's collection include Eugène Boudin, Nicolai Fechin, William-Adolphe Bouguereau, Félix Ziem, Eugène Isabey, Franz von Lenbach, Tim Lowly, Fritz von Uhde (Picture Book), Hermann Corrodi (Venice), Ludwig von Zumbusch, Leopold Schmutzler, and Franz Stuck (Judgment of Paris).

== Library ==
The Frye Art Museum library contains more than 2,000 books. It specializes in 19th and 20th century American and German art.
