= Praproče =

Praproče may refer to several places in Slovenia:

- Praproče, Dobrova–Polhov Gradec, a settlement in the Municipality of Dobrova–Polhov Gradec
- Praproče, Koper, a settlement in the Municipality of Koper
- Praproče, Ribnica, a settlement in the Municipality of Ribnica
- Praproče, Semič, a settlement in the Municipality of Semič
- Praproče pri Grosupljem, a settlement in the Municipality of Grosuplje
- Praproče pri Temenici, a settlement in the Municipality of Ivančna Gorica
- Praproče v Tuhinju, a settlement in the Municipality of Kamnik
- Praproše, a settlement in the Municipality of Radovljica, sometimes known as Praproče
