= Vrh pri Višnji Gori =

Vrh pri Višnji Gori Vrh (until 1953)
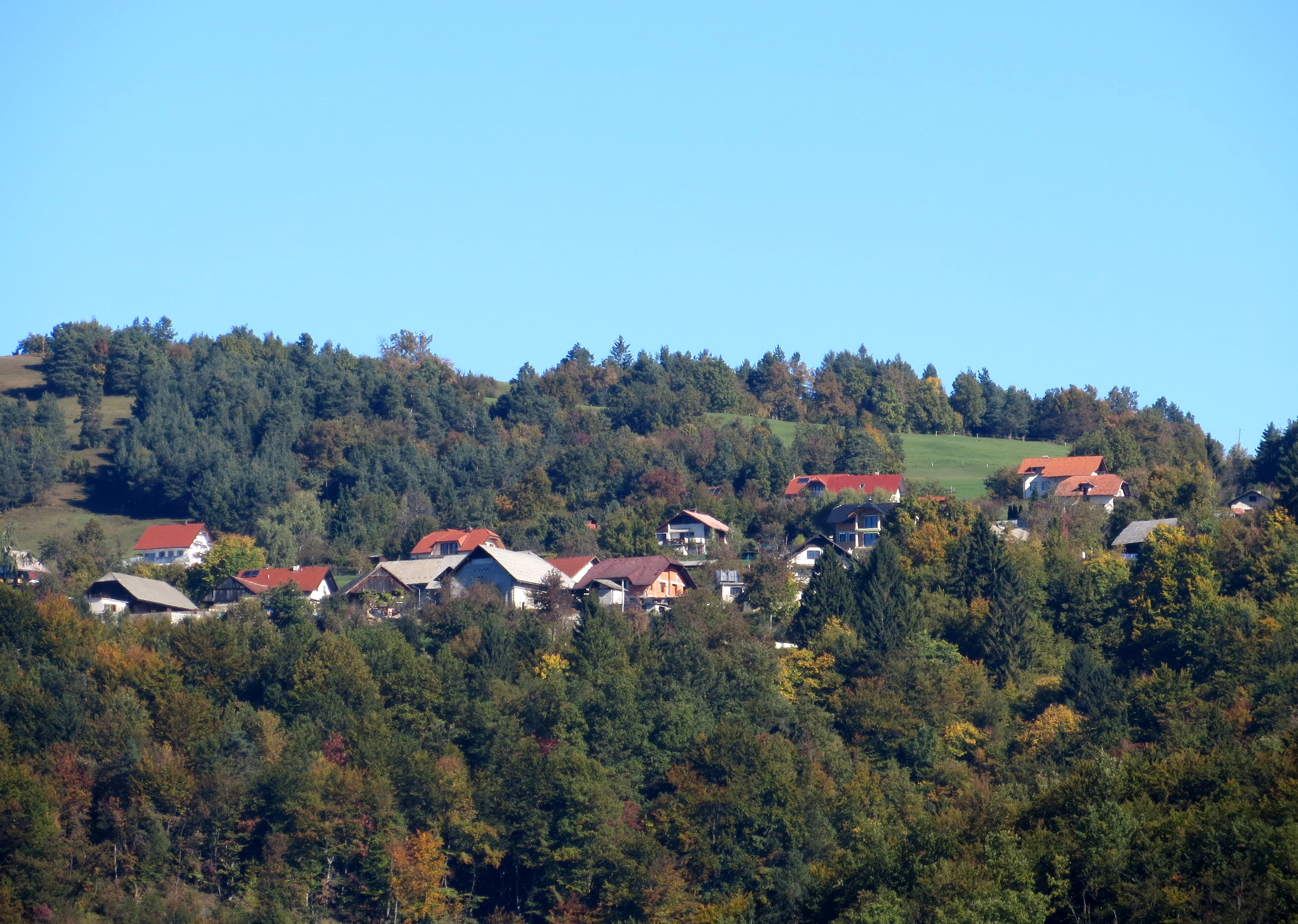

- Location in Slovenia
- Coordinates: 45°58′6.88″N 14°44′32.79″E
- Country: Slovenia
- Traditional region: Lower Carniola
- Statistical region: Central Slovenia
- Municipality: Ivančna Gorica

Area
  - Total: 1.82 km^{2} (0.70 sq mi)
- Elevation: 551.6 m (1,810 ft)

Population (2002)
  - Total: 106

Vrh pri Višnji Gori (pronounced [ˈʋəɾx pɾi ˈʋiːʃnji ˈɡɔːɾi]; German: Greifenberg) is a settlement in the hills to the north above Višnja Gora in the Municipality of Ivančna Gorica in central Slovenia. The area is part of the historical region of Lower Carniola. The municipality is now included in the Central Slovenia Statistical Region.

== Name ==
The name of the settlement was changed from Vrh to Vrh pri Višnji Gori in 1953. In the past the German name was Greifenberg.

== Cultural heritage ==
A number of Late Bronze Age and Early Iron Age graves have been found in and around the village. An inventory of the graves and finds is kept by the Vienna Museum of Natural History

== Notable people ==
- Sašo Hribar (1960–2023), Slovenian media personality and comedian
