= Spodnje Blato =

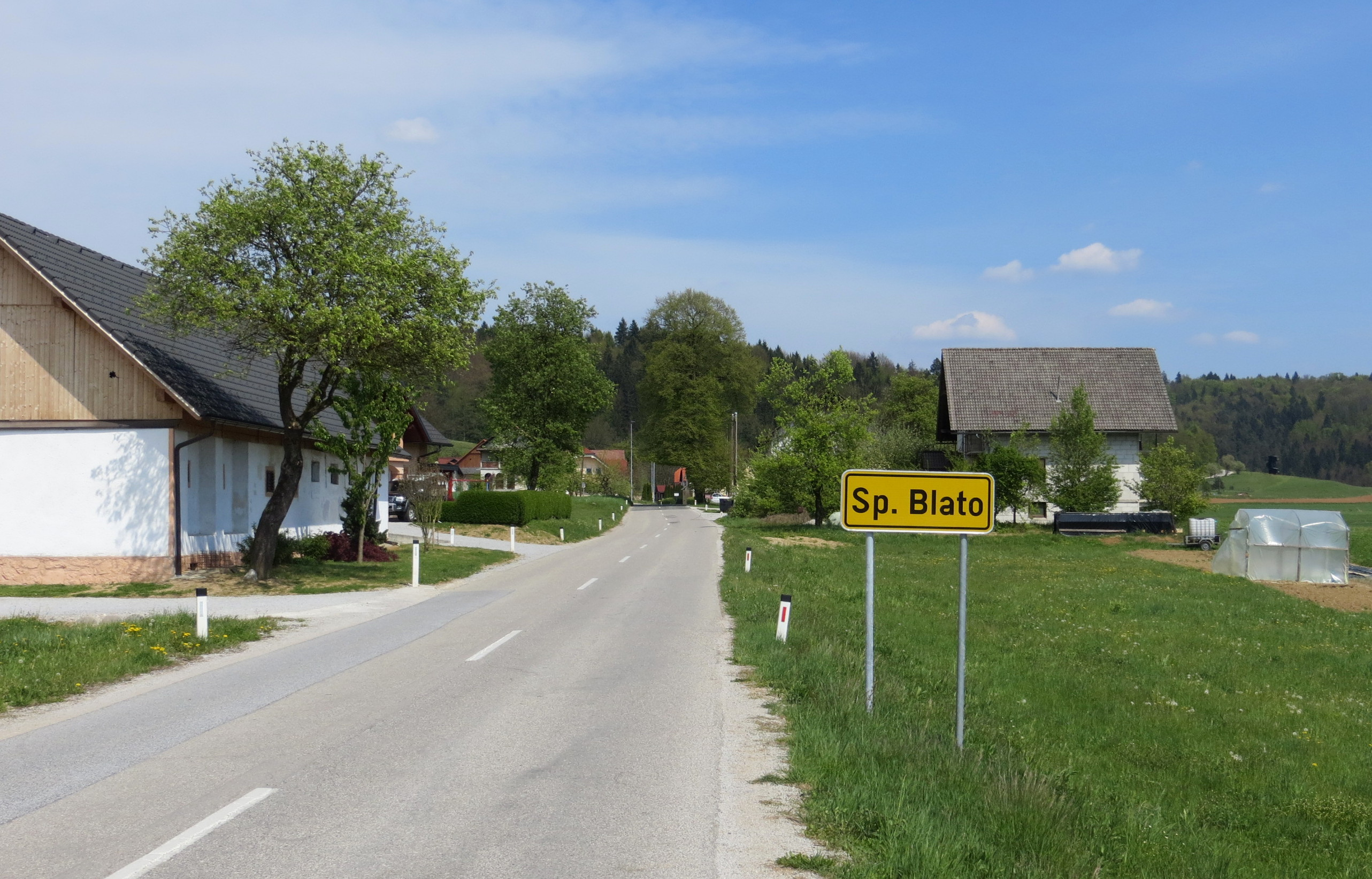

- Location in Slovenia
- Coordinates: 45°57′19.37″N 14°40′54.26″E
- Country: Slovenia
- Traditional region: Lower Carniola
- Statistical region: Central Slovenia
- Municipality: Grosuplje

Area
  - Total: 3.64 km^{2} (1.41 sq mi)
- Elevation: 338.5 m (1,111 ft)

Population (2002)
  - Total: 112

Spodnje Blato (pronounced [ˈspoːdnjɛ ˈblaːtɔ]; formerly also (Dolenje) Blato, German: Unter Blatu) is a settlement just east of Grosuplje in central Slovenia. The area is part of the historical region of Lower Carniola and is now included in the Central Slovenia Statistical Region.

== Geography ==
Spodnje Blato is a ribbon village along the road below Stehan Hill (467 meters or 1,532 feet). Stone Hill (Kamna gorica, 389 meters or 1,276 feet) rises to the west, and the Frjača Woods extends to the east. Breg Creek, a tributary of Gatina Creek (Gatinski potok) flows from Ugly Ravine (Grda žleb) on the north slope of Stehan Hill.

== Name ==
Spodnje Blato (literally 'lower Blato') was also known as Dolenje Blato in the past. The name of the settlement was Unter Blatu in German in the past. Locally, the village is simply known as Blato, which was also its official name at the beginning of the 20th century.

== History ==
In the past, a mill operated along Breg Creek, but it was abandoned by the mid-20th century. Until 1998, Praproče pri Grosupljem was a hamlet of Spodnje Blato.

=== Mass graves ===
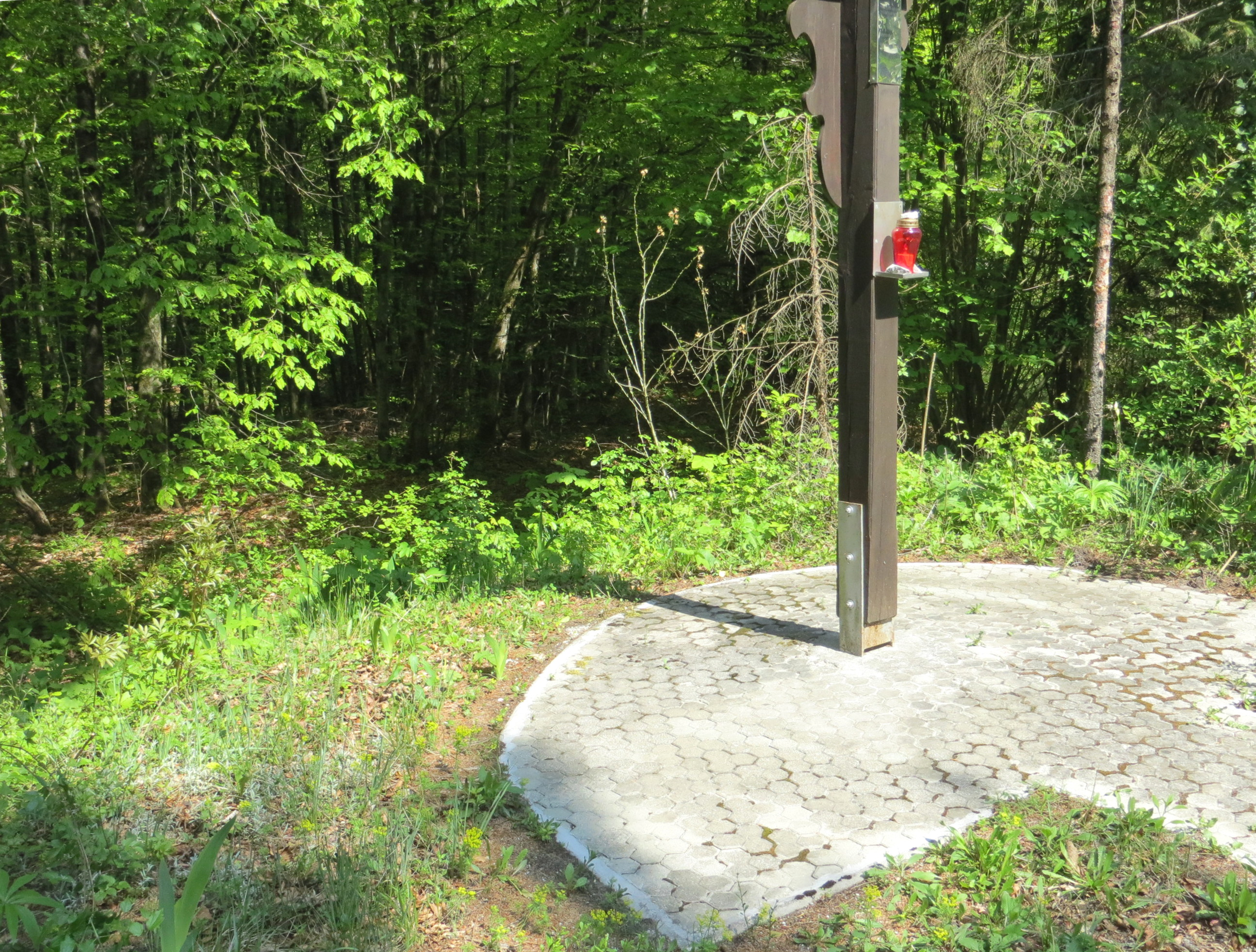
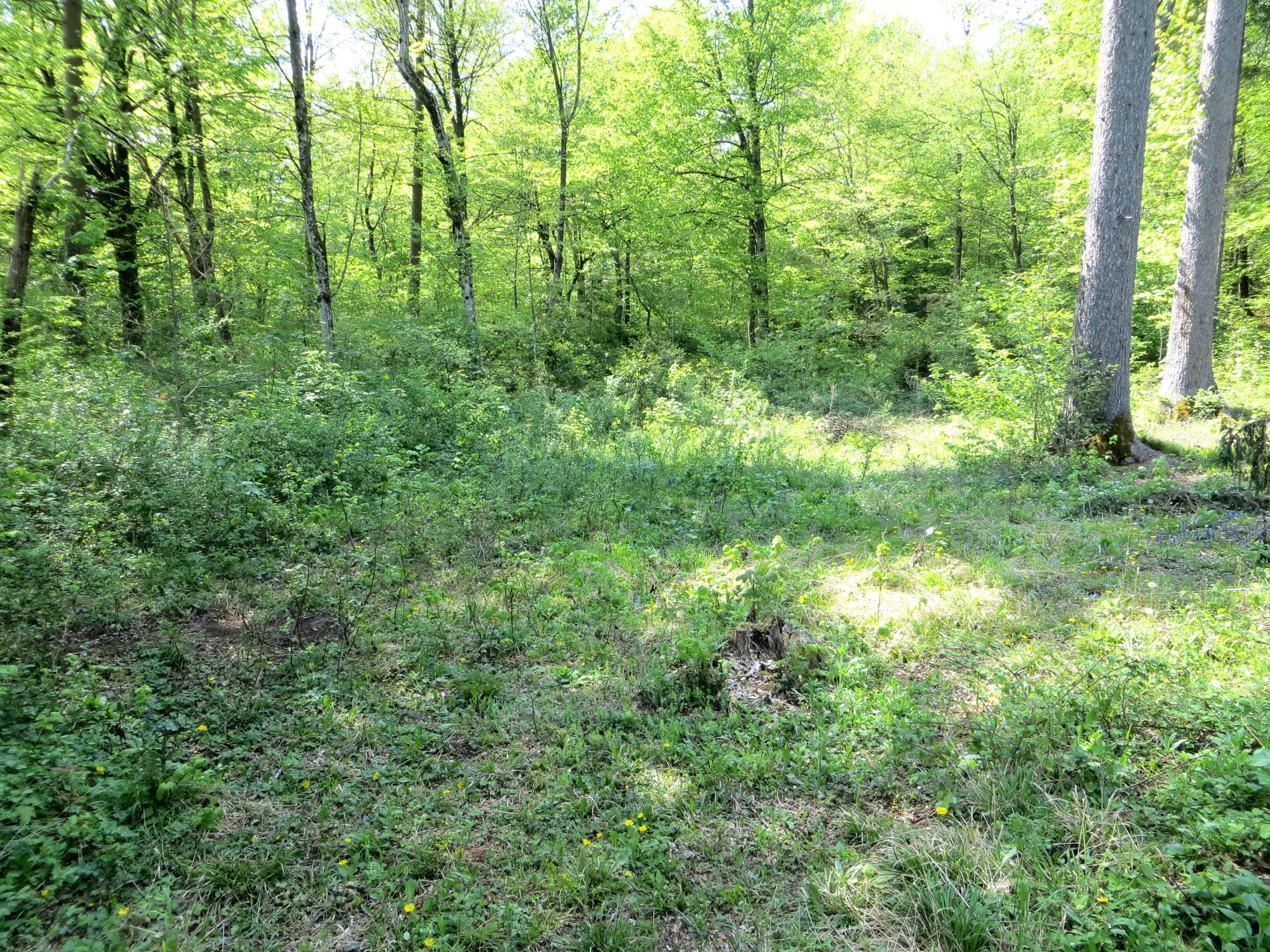
Stehan 1 (left) and Stehan 2 (right) mass graves

Spodnje Blato is the site of two known mass graves from the period after the Second World War. Both of them lie east of the settlement and they contain the remains of Slovene civilians and former Home Guard soldiers that had been granted amnesty and released from prisons, but were murdered on their way home in August 1945. The victims were from the vicinity of Grosuplje and Višnja Gora. The Stehan 1 Mass Grave (Slovene: Grobišče Stehan 1) lies on the left side of the old road to Višnja Gora before the road that turns off to the local dump. The Stehan 2 Mass Grave (Grobišče Stehan 2) is west of the first site, about 300 meters (980 ft) south of the abandoned local dump.
