= Praproče pri Grosupljem =

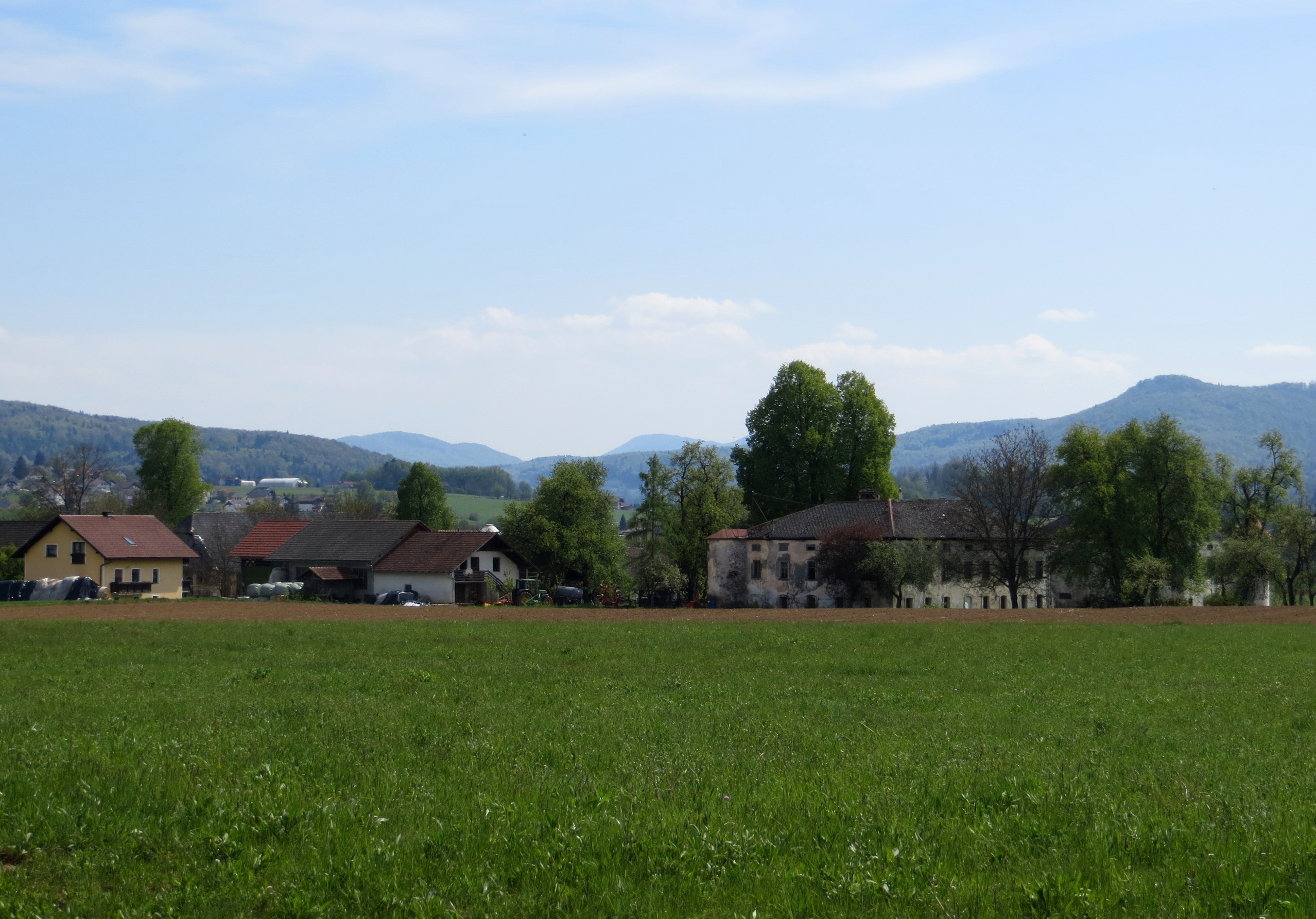

- Location in Slovenia
- Coordinates: 45°57′6.66″N 14°40′29.72″E
- Country: Slovenia
- Traditional region: Lower Carniola
- Statistical region: Central Slovenia
- Municipality: Grosuplje

Area
  - Total: 1.14 km^{2} (0.44 sq mi)
- Elevation: 333.4 m (1,094 ft)

Population (2002)
  - Total: 48

Praproče pri Grosupljem (pronounced [ˈpɾaːpɾɔtʃɛ pɾi ɡɾɔˈsuːpljɛm]; in older sources also Prapreče, German: Lichtenberg) is a small settlement east of Grosuplje in central Slovenia. The area is part of the historical region of Lower Carniola. The Municipality of Grosuplje is now included in the Central Slovenia Statistical Region.

== History ==
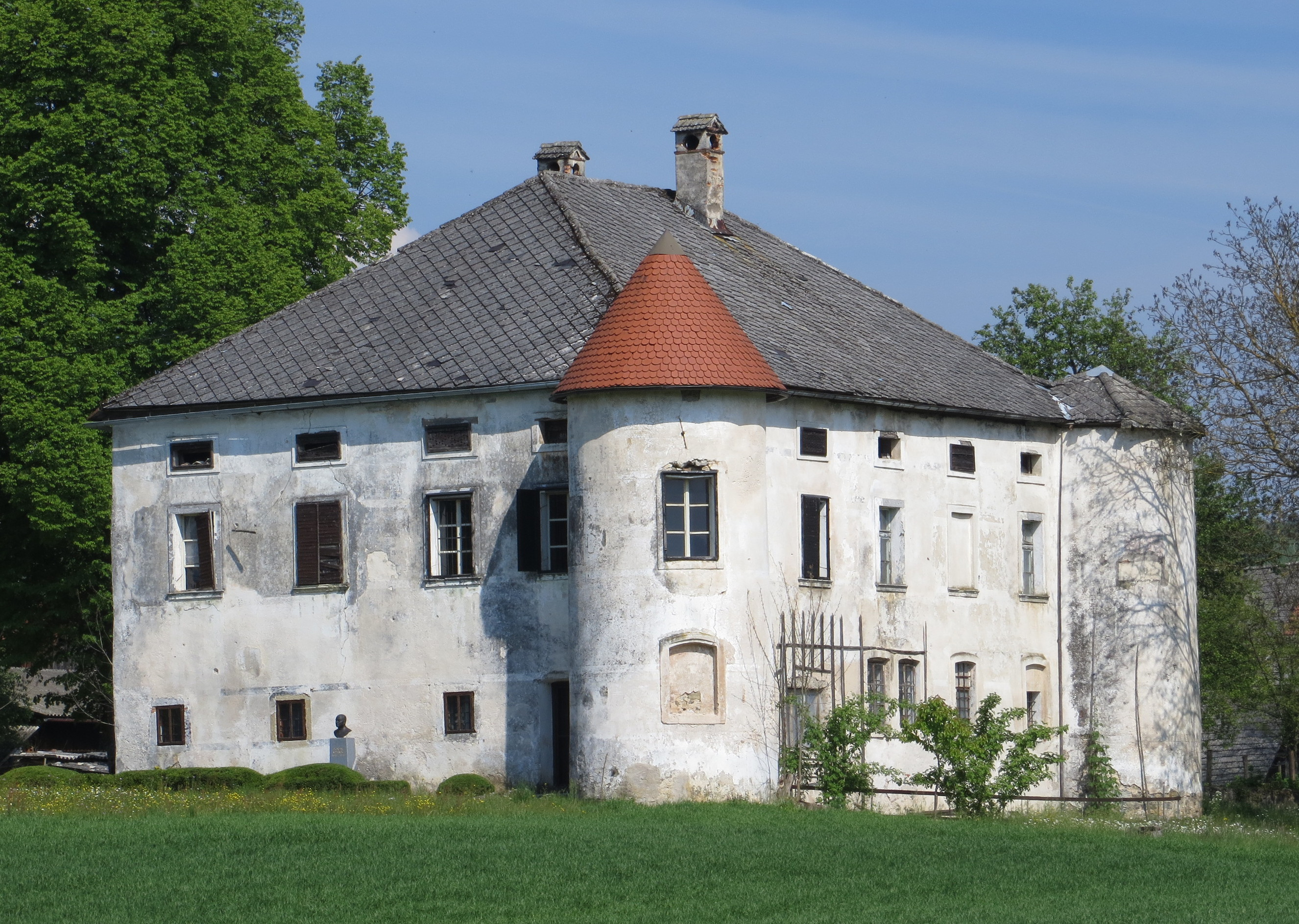
South wing of Praproče Manor

The Slovene-American author and translator Louis Adamic was born in the settlement in 1898. Until 1998, Praproče pri Grosupljem was a hamlet of Spodnje Blato.

== Notable people ==
Notable people that were born or lived in Praproče pri Grosupljem include:

- Louis Adamic (1898–1951), Slovene-American author and translator
- France Adamič (1911–2004), technical writer and orchard specialist
- Countess Antonie Cäcilia Philomena Ravenegg (née Lichtenberg, 1841–1929), wife of Emil Rotschütz and author of Die erprobte Honig-Köchin
- Emil Rotschütz (a.k.a. Ravenegg, Rožič; 1836–1906), apiculture specialist
