= Adamic (disambiguation) =

Adamic may refer to:

- Various things related to the Biblical figure Adam
- Adamic language
- Adamic (surname)
- Enochian, a language called "Adamical" by John Dee
