= Common Ground (magazine) =

- Former editors: Louis Adamic, M. Margaret Anderson
- Categories: Literary magazine
- Frequency: Quarterly
- Publisher: Princeton University Press
- First issue: September 1940
- Final issue: 1949
- Company: Common Council for American Unity (CCAU)
- Country: USA
- Based in: New York City
- Language: English

Common Ground was a literary magazine published quarterly between 1940 and 1949 by the Common Council for American Unity to further an appreciation of contributions to U.S. culture by many ethnic, religions and national groups.

== Founding ==
The magazine was created by attorney Read Lewis (1887–1984), who helped found the Settlement House Movement, Slovenian American author Louis Adamic (aka Alojz Adamič) and M. Margaret Anderson. The Carnegie Corporation of New York provided funding to start the new magazine. The name of the magazine was likely taken from the title of a book of the same name published by a leading member of the interfaith movement in 1938. Early staff included include the future senator Alan Cranston and the poet Charles Olson.

Louis Adamic was instrumental in the founding of the magazine. In 1940 he became the director of the Common Council for American Unity (CCAU) and became the founding editor. A prolific writer in the 1930s, Adamic had begun a writing career after serving in the U.S. Army in World War I. By the 1930s he was a prominent social critic and writer focusing on the immigrant experience in America. He was the author of Dynamite: The Story of Class Violence in America (1931) and Laughing in the Jungle: The Autobiography of an Immigrant in America (1932). In 1932 he was awarded the Guggenheim Fellowship. Adamic had helped found the Common Council for American Unity (CCAU) in 1939. The CCAU succeeded the Foreign Language Information Service (FLIS), which had formed in 1921 to counter the anti-immigrant attitudes that became prevalent in the U.S. during the 1920s. In 1959, the CCAU merged with the American Federation of International Institutes to form the American Council for Nationalities Services (ACNS). ACNS later became the Immigration and Refugee Services of America in 1994, and in 2004 changed its name to U.S. Committee for Refugees and Immigrants (USCRI).

Adamic's advocacy for cultural pluralism is captured by his insistence that "in the past there has been entirely too much giving up, too much melting away and shattering of the various cultural values of the new groups." Adamic insisted that the "Americanized foreigner became a cultural zero paying lip service to the U.S., which satisfied the Americanizers." In place of Americanization, he proposed "Americanism", which would make a "central educational and cultural effort… toward accepting, welcoming, and exploiting diversity."

Leading into World War II, Adamic felt uncomfortable with FDR’s call for “total defense” and preferred the term “inclusive defense”, which all Americans, "all people of the country, will have to be drawn, not forced in any way, but drawn, inspired into full participation in the effort ahead, which will include armament. He was not a pacifist, but instead argued for a wide-flung and deep-reaching offensive for democracy within our own borders and our own individual makeups." He believed the left should not advance an "against program - mere 'anti-fascism,' mere 'anti-totalitarianism' is insufficient" and "may itself result in fascism and totalitarianism."

Common Ground shifted its coverage over its decade of publication. Under Adamic's editorship most articles focused on immigration and white ethnicity. In particular Adamic stressed the Americanism and assimilation of Japanese Americans. After he stepped down from his editorship in 1942, articles shifted to mostly to criticism of prejudice against African Americans.

== Notable articles ==
"In the Flow of time" by Beatrice Griffith, published in the September 1948 issue of Common Ground, was listed in the Best American Short Stories of the Century. Eleanor Roosevelt wrote The Democratic Effort in the first issue of 1942. praising immigrants and the role they would play in the war effort.

In November 1941, the folk singer Pete Seeger introduced singer-songwriter Woody Guthrie to his friend the poet Charles Olson, then a junior editor at the fledgling magazine. The meeting led to Guthrie writing "Ear Players" in the Spring 1942 issue of Common Ground. The article marked Guthrie's debut as a published writer. Subsequently Guthrie wrote articles in both the Autumn 1942 and Spring 1943 issues.

American poet and social activist Langston Hughes began contributing to the magazine in the autumn 1941 issue, and would become the most frequent contributor to the magazine. He was an active member of the magazine's Advisory Editorial Board from its inception in spring of 1942 until the magazine ceased publication in 1950. Hughes' article White Folks do the funniest things was published in Common Ground in 1944 and subsequently be syndicated in major newspapers across the country.

== Editorial board ==
In addition to Adamic, the editorial board was made up of Van Wyck Brooks, Pearl Buck, Mary Ellen Chase, Langston Hughes, Alvin Johnson, Thomas Mann, and Lin Yutang.

== Notable contributors ==
- Norman Corwin
- future U.S. senator Alan Cranston
- Woody Guthrie
- Robert Maynard Hutchins
- Clemens Kalischer
- Yasuo Kuniyoshi
- Max Lerner
- Alan Lomax
- Archibald MacLeish
- D'Arcy McNickle
- Carey McWilliams
- Robert Nathan
- Paul Robeson
- Eleanor Roosevelt
- Thomas Sancton Sr.
- William Saroyan
- Arthur M. Schlesinger, Sr.
- Lillian Smith (author)
- Sigrid Undset
- J. Milton Yinger

== See also ==
- Ethnic Studies
- Louis Adamic
