= Wang Ping (author) =

American poet (born 1957)

- 王屏
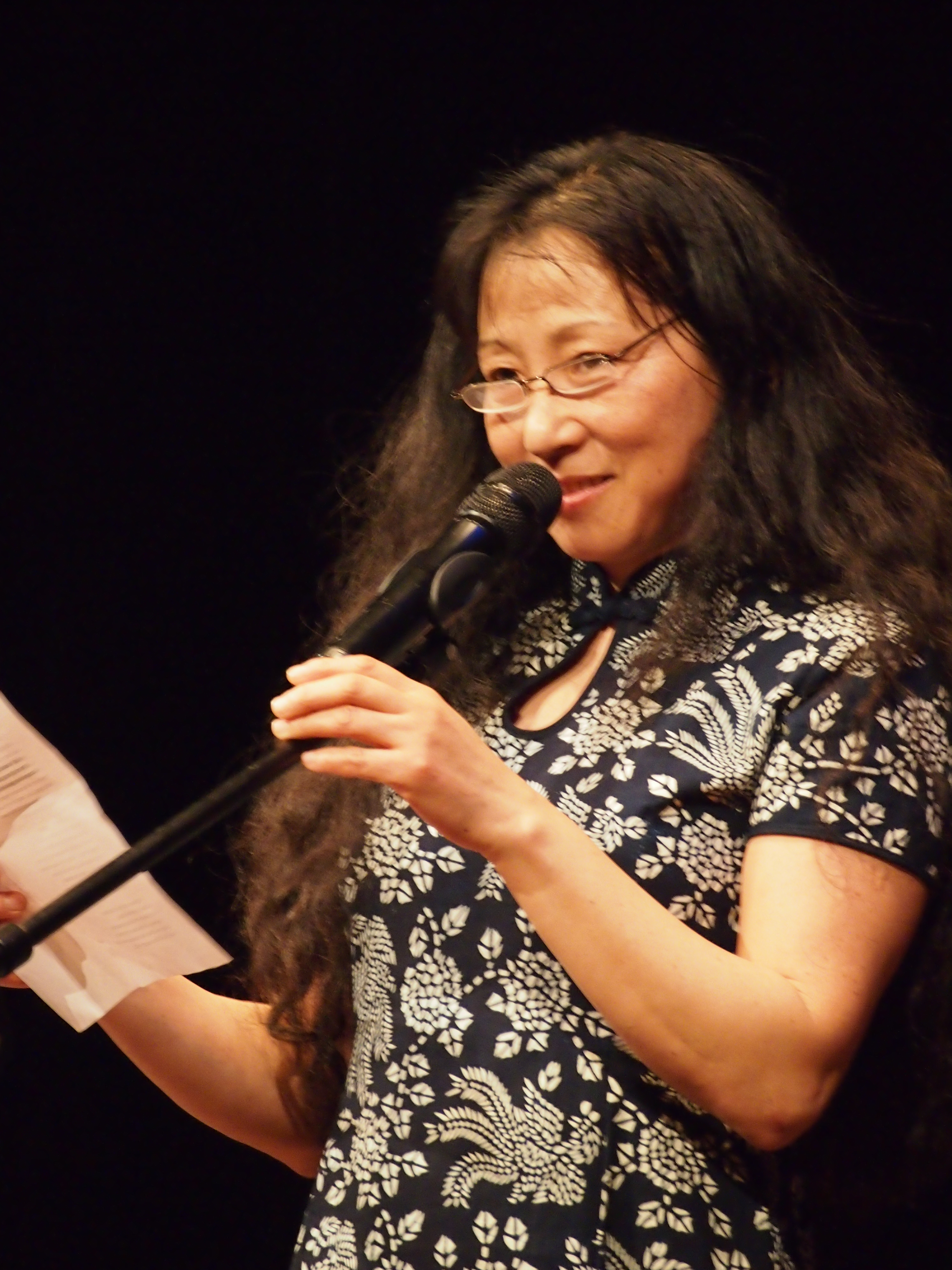
- Reading at Split This Rock, 2014
- Born: August 14, 1957 (age 69); Shanghai, China
- Citizenship: Chinese
- Education: Peking University (BA); Long Island University (MA); New York University (PhD)
- Writing career
- Genres: Poetry, short stories, novels, cultural studies, children's stories, documentaries, photography, performance and multimedia art.

Chinese name
- Chinese: 王屏
Transcriptions
Standard Mandarin
- Hanyu Pinyin: Wáng Píng
- Website: www.wangping.com

Wang Ping (born August 14, 1957) is a Chinese American professor, poet, writer, photographer, performance and multimedia artist. Her publications have been translated into multiple languages and include poetry, short stories, novels, cultural studies, and children's stories. Her multimedia exhibitions address global themes of industrialization, the environment, interdependency, and the people.

== Life and education ==
Wang Ping was born in Shanghai and grew up on a small island in the East China Sea. After three years farming in a mountain village during the Cultural Revolution, mostly self-taught with little prior formal education available, she attended Peking University and earned her bachelor's degree in English literature. In 1985 she left China to study in the U.S., earning her master's degree in English literature from Long Island University and Ph.D. in comparative literature from New York University.

She is the recipient of numerous awards, a professor of English, and founder of the Kinship of Rivers project, which builds a sense of community among people living along rivers around the world. The project engages communities in creating and sharing art by making river prayer flags as gifts to other communities.

== Writing and exhibits ==
Her books include four collections of poetry, My Name Is Immigrant, The Magic Whip, Of Flesh & Spirit, and Ten Thousand Waves; the cultural study Aching for Beauty: Footbinding in China (Eugene M. Kayden Award for Best Book in the Humanities); the novel Foreign Devil; two collections of fiction stories entitled American Visa (NYC Public Library Award for the Teen Age) and The Last Communist Virgin (Minnesota Book Award for Novel & Short Story and Book Award from the Association for Asian American Studies for Poetry/Prose); a children's book of Chinese folk lore, The Dragon Emperor; and a book of creative nonfiction, Life of Miracles along the Yangtze and Mississippi (AWP Award Series Winner for Creative Nonfiction). She is also the editor and co-translator of the anthology New Generation: Poetry from China Today, co-translator of Flames by Xue Di, and co-translator of Flash Cards: Poems by Yu Jian.

The exhibit "Behind the Gate: After the Flood of the Three Gorges" features photos, related texts and video. It is intended to introduce visitors to the benefits and dangers of the Three Gorges Dam, such as energy production, increased commerce, flood control, disruption of sewage and sediment drainage. It also details the personal stories of individuals displaced by the project and the environmental impacts on the river ecosystem, its land and animal species.

Similarly, the exhibit "All Roads to Lhasa: The Qinghai-Tibet Railroad" also features photos, related texts and video. It is intended to introduce visitors to the benefits and dangers of the railroad, such as economic, cultural and ecological impacts. It looks at the fragile ecosystem of glaciers and land that are the source for many of Asia's rivers, in addition to stories of the people and animals affected by the project.

The multimedia exhibit "We Are Water: Kinship of Rivers" features an array of artwork, including its signature river prayer flags, a Tibetan sand mandala, photos, video, visual art, writing, sculpture, singing, dancing, food, and more. It represents the culmination of the first five years of the Kinship of Rivers project.

Wang also collaborated with British filmmaker Isaac Julien on "Ten Thousand Waves", a film installation about a tragedy that occurred on February 5, 2004, when twenty-three Chinese migrant laborers drowned in Morecambe Bay, England, caught off guard by an incoming tide.

Wang's writing and photos are frequently published in journals, anthologies, and other periodical around the world.

== Academic career ==
After earning her bachelor's degree from Beijing University, Wang taught English there before moving to the U.S. After moving to New York, she spent much of the 1990s as a writing instructor or poet in residence. She also taught Chinese literature at the Baruch and York Colleges of The City University of New York (CUNY) while pursuing her Ph.D. In 1999 Wang obtained a position as a professor at Macalester College in St. Paul, MN, and she was bestowed the title of professor emerita upon her retirement in 2020.

== Awards ==
Wang's books have won the AWP Award for Creative Nonfiction, Minnesota Award for Novel & Short Story, Association for Asian American Studies Award for Poetry/Prose, University of Colorado's Eugene M. Kayden Award for the Best Book in the Humanities, and NYC Public Library Award for the Teen Age.

She's been the recipient of fellowships, grants, and residencies from the National Endowment for the Arts, New York Foundation for the Arts, New York State Council for the Arts, Minnesota State Arts Board, Loft Literary Center, McKnight Foundation, Bush Foundation, Lannan Foundation, and Vermont Studio Center.

Other awards include the LIU Distinct Alumna Award, Immigrant of Distinction Award, and more.

== Works ==
- American Visa, short stories, Coffee House Press, 1994 (translated into Dutch as Vossengeur, Uitgeverij de Prom, 1997; translated into Japanese as アメリカンビザ, Kadokawa Shoten Publishing, 1994)
- Flames: Poems by Xue Di, poetry (co-translated with Keith Waldrop), Paradigm Press, 1995
- Foreign Devil, novel, Coffee House Press, 1996 (translated into German as Fremder Teufel, Peperkorn, 1997)
- Of Flesh & Spirit, poetry, Coffee House Press, 1998
- New Generation: Poems from China Today, poetry anthology (co-translated with Ron Padgett, Anne Waldman, Lewis Warsh, Dick Lourie, and others), Hanging Loose Press, 1999
- Aching for Beauty: Footbinding in China, cultural study, University of Minnesota Press, 2000 (paperback published by Random House, 2002)
- The Magic Whip, poetry, Coffee House Press, 2003
- The Last Communist Virgin, short stories, Coffee House Press, 2007
- The Dragon Emperor: A Chinese Folktale, children's folklore, Millbrook Press, 2008
- Flash Cards: Poems by Yu Jian, poetry (co-translated with Ron Padgett), Zephyr Press, 2010
- Ten Thousand Waves, poetry, Wings Press, 2014
- Life of Miracles along the Yangtze and Mississippi, creative nonfiction, University of Georgia Press, 2018
- My Name Is Immigrant, poetry, Hanging Loose Press, 2020
