= Adamic (surname) =

Adamić, Adamič, or Adamic is a patronymic surname in South Slavic languages literally meaning "son of Adam". Notable people with the surname include:

- Andrija Ljudevit Adamić (1766–1828), Croatian businessman
- Bojan Adamič (1912–1995), Slovenian film score composer
- Emil Adamič (1877–1936), Slovenian composer
- France Adamič (1911–2004), Slovene agronomist and author
- Josip Adamić (1907–1931), Yugoslavian communist
- Lada Adamic, American scientist
- Louis Adamic (1898–1951), Slovene-American author and translator
