= Dynamite: The Story of Class Violence in America =

1931 book

- Author: Louis Adamic
- Publisher: Viking Press
- Publication date: 1931
- Pages: 452

Dynamite: The Story of Class Violence in America is a 1931 book by Louis Adamic.

== Bibliography ==
- Bamford, E. F. (1932). "Review of Dynamite". Social Science. 7 (1): 87. ISSN 0037-7848. JSTOR 23758233.
- Edwards, Lyford P. (1935). "Review of Dynamite: The Story of Class Violence in America". American Journal of Sociology. 41 (3): 375. doi:10.1086/217114. ISSN 0002-9602. JSTOR 2768377.
- Feld, Rose C. (August 5, 1934). "The Story of Class Violence in America; Dynamite: The Story of Class Violence in America. By Louis Adamic. Revised Edition. Illustrated. 495 pp. New York: The Viking Press. $2. Class Violence". The New York Times. ISSN 0362-4331.
- Kayden, Eugene M. (1931). "Review of Dynamite. The Story of Class Violence in America". The Sewanee Review. 39 (4): 511. ISSN 0037-3052. JSTOR 27534715.
- Lovett, Robert Morss (1931). "Review of Dynamite. The Story of Class Violence in America". International Journal of Ethics. 41 (4): 513–516. doi:10.1086/intejethi.41.4.2378311. ISSN 1526-422X. JSTOR 2378311.
- Rayner, Richard (February 8, 2009). "'Dynamite: The Story of Class Violence in America' by Louis Adamic". Los Angeles Times.
- Reitman, Ben L. (1931). "Review of Dynamite: The Story of Class Violence in America". American Journal of Sociology. 37 (2): 314–316. doi:10.1086/215687. ISSN 0002-9602. JSTOR 2766564.
- Schuler, Edgar A. (1935). "Is There an American Revolution?". Southwest Review. 20 (3): 1–10. ISSN 0038-4712. JSTOR 43466336.
- Spero, Sterling D. (1932). "Review of Dynamite: The Story of Class Violence in America.; The General Strike". Political Science Quarterly. 47 (2): 305–307. doi:10.2307/2143101. ISSN 0032-3195. JSTOR 2143101.
- Stolberg, Benjamin (1931). "Review of Dynamite". The Annals of the American Academy of Political and Social Science. 155: 248–249. doi:10.1177/000271623115500142. ISSN 0002-7162. JSTOR 1018040.
- Witte, Edwin E. (1931). "Review of Dynamite: The Story of Class Violence in America". Journal of Political Economy. 39 (6): 826–828. doi:10.1086/254291. ISSN 0022-3808. JSTOR 1823178.
