= Clemens Kalischer =

American photographer (1921–2018)

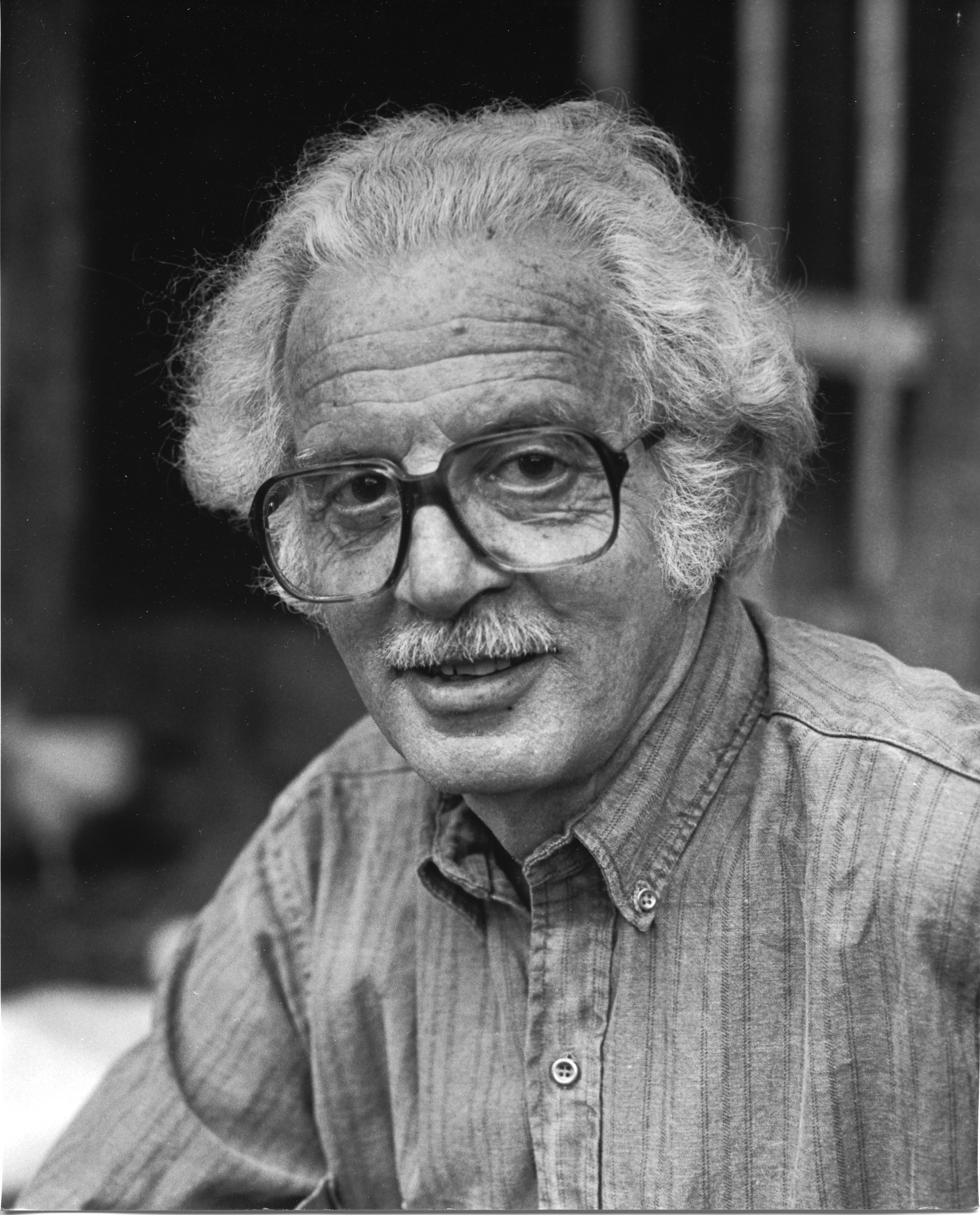
- Born: March 30, 1921; Lindau, Germany
- Died: June 9, 2018 (aged 97); Lenox, Massachusetts, U.S.
- Website: www.clemenskalischer.com

Clemens Kalischer (March 30, 1921 – June 9, 2018) was an American photojournalist and art photographer. He was born in Germany and immigrated to the United States.

His series of photographs of displaced persons arriving in New York City from displaced persons camps in post-World War II Europe, taken in 1947 and 1948, was his most recognized work.

== Life and work ==
Kalischer was born in Lindau, Germany. He immigrated to France via Switzerland (1933) and then to the United States via Morocco (1942). His family fled from Berlin in 1933 and settled in Paris. He was taken prisoner in France in 1939 and survived three years of forced labor in eight different work camps (1939–1942). He was reunited with his father in the last camp and his family escaped to the U.S. with the aid of Varian Fry. From 1944 through 1946 he studied art at the Cooper Union. Since 1951, Kalischer lived in Stockbridge, Massachusetts. He married Angela Wottitz in 1956. They had two children.

== Career ==
Kalischer was a member of ASPP (American Society of Picture Professionals); a member of One by One (an international dialogue group between survivors and perpetrators of the Holocaust) and worked as a freelance photographer of The New York Times, Newsweek, Life, Fortune, Du, The Sun, Yankee, Coronet, Country Journal, Moment, Vermont Life, In Context, Jubilee, Yes, Orion, Ploughshares, Common Ground, Architectural Forum, Places, Urban Design International, Progressive Architectural, and Time magazine. His photograph of a little boy with his puppy at the base of apartment steps on the West Side, New York, was selected by Edward Steichen for the world-touring Museum of Modern Art exhibition The Family of Man exhibition, seen by 9 million visitors.

His series of photographs of people arriving in New York City from displaced persons camps in post-World War II Europe, taken in 1947 and 1948, was his most recognized work. Many are included in Clemens Kalischer, edited by Denis Brudna and Norbert Bunge (Hatje Cantz).

In 2009 he revealed that when in the 1950s he'd settled in Stockbridge that as a young photographer he had met Norman Rockwell who had a studio next door and had taken reference photographs for the artist.

== The Image Gallery ==
In Stockbridge, Massachusetts, he opened a gallery in 1965, The Image Gallery, to represent new artists. The gallery is still open, showing works by Kalischer. His work spanned over 70 years of images. His freelance work focused on music (The Marlboro Music Festival, The Lenox School of Jazz, South Mountain Music Festival, Tanglewood, and many more), the arts (Black Mountain College, Pilobolus, the Flaherty Film Seminar, the Berkshire Theatre Festival, and many more), architecture, farming (CSA's, Italian Piedmont, the Slow Food Movement, Vermont, and more), nature, portraiture, images from the U.S. south, urban and rural areas of the U.S., images from Europe, India, Cuba, and Israel.

Kalischer died on June 9, 2018, in Lenox, Massachusetts, aged 97.

== Books ==
- La montagna dell'esodo. Racconti fotografici di Clemens Kalischer Museo Nazionale della Montagna, 1996. ISBN 88-85903-60-6.
- Clemens Kalischer. Marval, 2004. ISBN 2-86234-377-3.
- Clemens Kalischer New York - Photographien 1947-1959. 2000. By Sylvia Böhmer. ISBN 3-929203-29-4.
- Clemens Kalischer. Hatje Cantz, 2002. ISBN 3-7757-1129-5. With an introduction by Norbert Bunge and Denis Brudna.
- Clemens Kalischer, Le Flux Du Quotidien. Musee de la Photographie Charleroi, Belgium. Catalogue.

== Films ==
- Fully Awake – Black Mountain College documentary by Cathryn Davis Zommer; 10 of Kalischer's photographs used
- Music Inn – Documentary by Projectile Arts; about 200 of Kalischer's photographs photos used

== Exhibitions ==
=== Solo exhibitions ===
- Durham Art Center, North Carolina
- Berkshire Museum, Pittsfield - 4 exhibits
- McCullough House, Bennington, VT
- Washington Art Association, Connecticut
- Black Mountain College, North Carolina
- ZONE, Springfield, MA
- Brattleboro Museum, VT
- La montagna dell'esodo. Racconti fotografici di Clemens Kalischer, Museo Nazionale della Montagna, Torino, Italy 1996
- Argus Fotokunst art gallery, Berlin, Germany 1998, 2002, 2006
- Photography Gallery Prospekto, Vilnius, Lithuania 2006
- Estey Organ Co., Estey Organ Museum, Brattleboro, VT 2007
- Retrospective, Maison Robert Doisneau, Gentilly, France 2007
- KunstHaus Potsdam, Germany 2007
- Displaced Persons: Photographs by Clemens Kalischer, Holocaust Museum Houston, Houston Texas 2010
- Holocaust Museums South Africa (Cape Town, Durban and Johannesburg) 2012-2013
- The German Emigration Museum, Bremerhaven, Germany 2014
- The Lichtenstein Gallery, Pittsfield, MA
- The Bennington Museum, Bennington, VT 2017

=== Group exhibitions ===
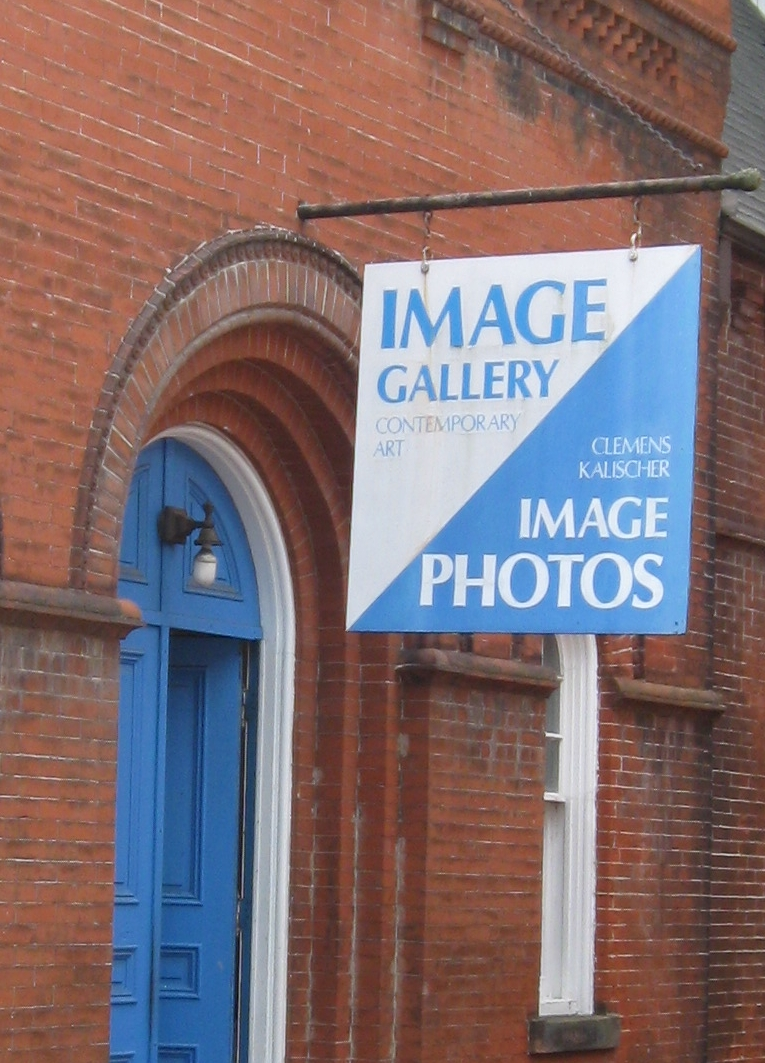
Kalischer's gallery in Stockbridge

- In & Out of Focus, Museum of Modern Art, New York, 1948
- The Family of Man, Museum of Modern Art, New York, 1955
- Man Alive, C.S. Exhibit, Wales
- Camera as a Witness, Montreal Expo, Montreal, 1967
- Exposition de la Photographie Francaise, Paris
- Decordova Museum, Lincoln, MA
- Carl Siembab Gallery, Boston
- Photo Vision '75, Boston, 1975
- Portrait of America, Smithsonian Institution
- The Photographer and the City, Smithsonian Institution
- Brattleboro Museum, Brattleboro, VT
- FotoFest, Houston, TX, 2002
- Willy-Brandt-Haus, Berlin, 2002
- Altonaer Museum, Hamburg, 2002
- Pilobolus, Hood Museum of Art Hanover, NH
- Life is Stranger Than Fiction, Albertina Museum, Vienna, Austria, 2007
- Rock'n Roll 1939-1959, Cartier Foundation, Paris, France, 2007

== Collections ==
Kalischer's work is held in the following public collections:

- Tate, London: 1 print (as of June 2018)
- Metropolitan Museum of Art, New York: 3 prints (as of June 2018)
- Brooklyn Museum, Brooklyn, NY
- Library of Congress (Master Photographers), Washington, D.C.
- Lawrence Art Museum Williams College, Williamstown, MA
- Museum of Modern Art, New York
- Bavarian Museum, Munich
- International Museum of Photography, New York
- The Minneapolis Institute of Art, Minneapolis
- Museum of Jewish Heritage, New York
- Diaspora Museum, Tel Aviv
- International Center of Photography, New York
- Hood Museum of Art, Dartmouth College, Hanover, NH
- Maison Robert Doisneau, Paris, France
- Sal Oppenheim Collection, Munich, Germany
- Colby College, Waterville, ME
- The German Emigration Museum, Bremerhaven, Germany
- Museo Nazionale della Montagna, Torino, Italy

== Grants ==
- National Council of Churches
- Experiment in International Living
- Cambridge Seven Aquarium
- Edwin Jaffe Foundation Grant for Holocaust Gathering
- Frank Taplin Grant for "Institute for Urban Design"
