= Laughing in the Jungle =

1932 autobiography by Louis Adamic

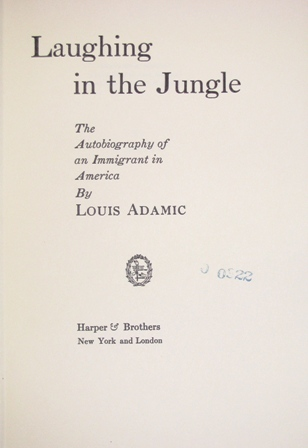
- Author: Louis Adamic
- Language: English
- Genre: Autobiography
- Publication date: 1932
- Publication place: USA
- ISBN: 978-0-405-00503-9

Laughing in the Jungle, published in 1932, is an autobiography by a Slovene-American writer Louis Adamic. As a fourteen year old, Adamic immigrated to the United States in 1913 from Carniola (Kranjska), at that time a part of the Austro-Hungarian Empire. In Adamic’s words, Laughing in the Jungle was an attempt to explain his experiences as an immigrant to America. The title of the book, Laughing in the Jungle, was inspired by Upton Sinclair’s 1906 book The Jungle. Adamic for the first time learned about the book from his Carniolan neighbor, Peter Molek, who said to him that “the whole of America is a jungle… [that] swallows many people who go there to work.” At first, Adamic did not understand Molek’s point, but after sixteen years in America, he came to believe that the United States “is more a jungle than civilization” where one can survive only with “knowledge and understanding of the scene, with a sense of humor.”

== Summary ==
Laughing in the Jungle is divided into five parts and 24 chapters. Adamic’s book generally adhered to the chronological order of events, beginning with his arrival in 1913 until 1929 when his story ends. However, his narrative is centered on several individuals that he encountered in the United States. Each of his acquaintances, according to Adamic, symbolized certain characteristics of American life. “Haphazardness, chaos, violence, and accident had ruled their lives.” The book begins with an Adamic's explanation why he came to America. His small village provided a steady stream of immigrants to the United States. Adamic recalled how these men symbolized affluence and success. Their stories depicted America as a fantastic place, geographically vast, and in constant motion. Under the influence of these images, Adamic wrote that he “played with the idea of going to America” when he was already eight or nine years old. However, his neighbor Molek, one of those who returned from the United States, sick and broken, told him stories about exploitation, work accidents, slums, and misery of immigrant life. Molek said that the immigrants were the “dung” that fertilizes the roots of America’s greatness. “All of which, on top of what I had previously heard and thought of America, tended to bewilder me,” admitted Adamic.

While in high school in Ljubljana, Adamic became associated with the Yugoslav Nationalist Movement. Their demonstrations provoked a violent response by Habsburg authorities that left his best friend dead and led to his arrest and expulsion from high school in 1913. Since Adamic was banned from all educational institutions in the Empire, a family member offered to get him into the Jesuit School. To avoid the school, Adamic decided to go to America. On board the ship Niagara, Adamic arrived in New York on December 30, 1913. His participation in anti-Austrian demonstrations allegedly earned him a certain fame in Slovene immigrant circles in New York. Soon after he arrived, Adamic obtained a job on a Slovene newspaper, Narodni Glas (Peoples' Voice).

Life in New York caused him “a deep and heavy sense of bewilderment.” He realized that “to know and understand” America he first had to learn the language. Adamic briefly attended an evening school, but soon realized “so far as my understanding of America was concerned, I was left almost entirely to myself.” He was a voracious reader and at the age of sixteen, he read Sinclair’s Jungle which profoundly influenced his thinking about America. “For a few days I felt a sharp hatred for the whole country.”

Laughing in the Jungle describes Adamic’s visits to South Slav and Central European immigrant communities in Pennsylvania and Ohio. He characterized his trip as “a depressing one.” He was appalled by his compatriots’ inability and unwillingness to assimilate, but even more by sordid living conditions in which these people lived. When Narodni Glas closed, he was forced to work manual jobs where he learned about “the harsh actualities of American industrial life.” Adamic was disgusted by his fellow workers, mostly European immigrants, who he described as “hopeless,” “selfish,” and “uninspiring.” “They did not belong in America. They knew nothing of the country, nor had the ability or desire to learn about it,” Adamic wrote. Yet, Adamic cautioned, one could not “afford to plunge too far into the economic and social issues of American life.”

The next portion of Laughing in the Jungle describes how Adamic quit his industrial job in 1917 and joined the US Army. While stationed in Panama, he learned what the actual jungle was, and thought of it as the appropriate analogy of America, “where everything strives to grow, to get better of the next thing.” Adamic spent a short time on the Western Front, and after he was discharged from the Army in 1921, he found himself again doing menial jobs. In a search of work, he moved to Los Angeles in 1922. Adamic believed that Los Angeles was the essence of the United States. “Los Angeles is America. A jungle.” He settled in San Pedro, a suburb with a large South Slav community that earned it the moniker “Balkan States.” On the bulletin board of the San Pedro Library, Adamic saw an ad for an examination for the position of port pilots’ clerk. He felt that he “was just the fellow for it.” Adamic passed the exam and in 1924 he received the appointment. “Thus began four very pleasant and peaceful years in my life. The position of municipal port pilots’ clerk was ideal for me,” Adamic wrote. After he got a comfortable white-collar job, Adamic dedicated his time to writing. “After my stories appeared in the Mercury or elsewhere, I received letters of commendation from F. Scott Fitzgerald, James Stevens, Carey McWilliams… people whose judgment I respected.” He attributed his success to his personal policy toward the United States “of a bystander and onlooker.” “I ‘played safe’,” as a sensible adventurer should do in a jungle,” cautioned Adamic his readers.

Laughing in the Jungle revolves around three motifs. Adamic in his book often used metaphors of “jungle” and “dung,” but also the theme of laughter as a form of resistance and survival. For Adamic, America was the jungle that grew “planlessly”[sic] and provided an opportunity for “inferior” and “superior” plants to flourish before they inevitably succumb to chaos and decay. The growth was provided by an abundant supply of “dung” made of invisible masses, both immigrant, and native, who were “fertilizing the roots of America’s material greatness.”

== Reception ==
Laughing in the Jungle received mostly positive reviews. Eda Lou Walton noted that Adamic’s book was more interesting for “its material than for its style.” She criticized his writing as unsensational and not “particularly fine,” and without purpose. Yet, Walton noted that Adamic’s observations of “almost every phase of the American scene” and book’s “utter realism” were the main force of the book.

According to the Saturday Review of Literature, Laughing in the Jungle “leaves out much of America.” Yet, the book, as Harry Laidler wrote, was “a most welcome addition to our social literature” because of its “lively, refreshingly frank and accurate description…[and] it portrays a side of the country which many smug native sons are utterly unaware of.”

John R. Adams from the San Diego Union noted that Laughing in the Jungle is “excellently written autobiography… [that] is more than a stimulating record of how one immigrant made good.” He noted that the book should be particularly interesting to Californians because Adamic spent his best years in San Pedro. Adams recommended the book because “there was comparatively little theorizing” in it.

The only relatively negative review came from the New Republic’s Robert Cantwell. He wrote that Laughing in the Jungle is “disheartening book, a book containing a wealth of material left like raw ore because of some faulty process of selection.” Cantwell criticized Adamic’s accounts of America as distorted and inauthentic because Adamic saw America through the eyes of H. L. Mencken. He wrote that the Laughing in the Jungle was a tribute to the “Sage of Baltimore,” because Adamic simply reiterated many Mencken’s thoughts about capitalism and democracy. Cantwell saw this as the main shortcoming of the book, at the same time he accused Adamic for the lack of ingenuity.

== Importance ==
Adamic's book is a good source for the history of South Slav and Eastern and Central European immigrants (“Bohunks”) in the United States. Louis Adamic’s immigrant fate was uncommon, but his observations about his compatriots and their life in America provide a window to observe ordinary “Bohunks” who “lived hectic, uncertain lives.” Laughing in the Jungle is more than a good ethnographic record of their lives. Adamic’s descriptions of the Slavic communities addressed some larger issues of American immigration history. He wrote about the problems of acculturation and assimilation, ethnic identity, gender roles, and religious and social organization of immigrant communities.

Thus, the importance of Laughing in the Jungle extends beyond the history of these particular ethnic groups in America. The book is also an excellent portrait of the United States in the 1910s and 1920s. Adamic’s book provides a vivid image of various, often marginalized segments of American society. He wrote about American radicals, disillusioned idealists, Hollywood swindlers, rum smugglers, Tammany Hall politicians. His book is a great source for those who study urban, labor, social, cultural, and political history of the United States in the first decades of the twentieth century.
