= Sašo Hribar =

Slovenian radio host and comedian (1960–2023)

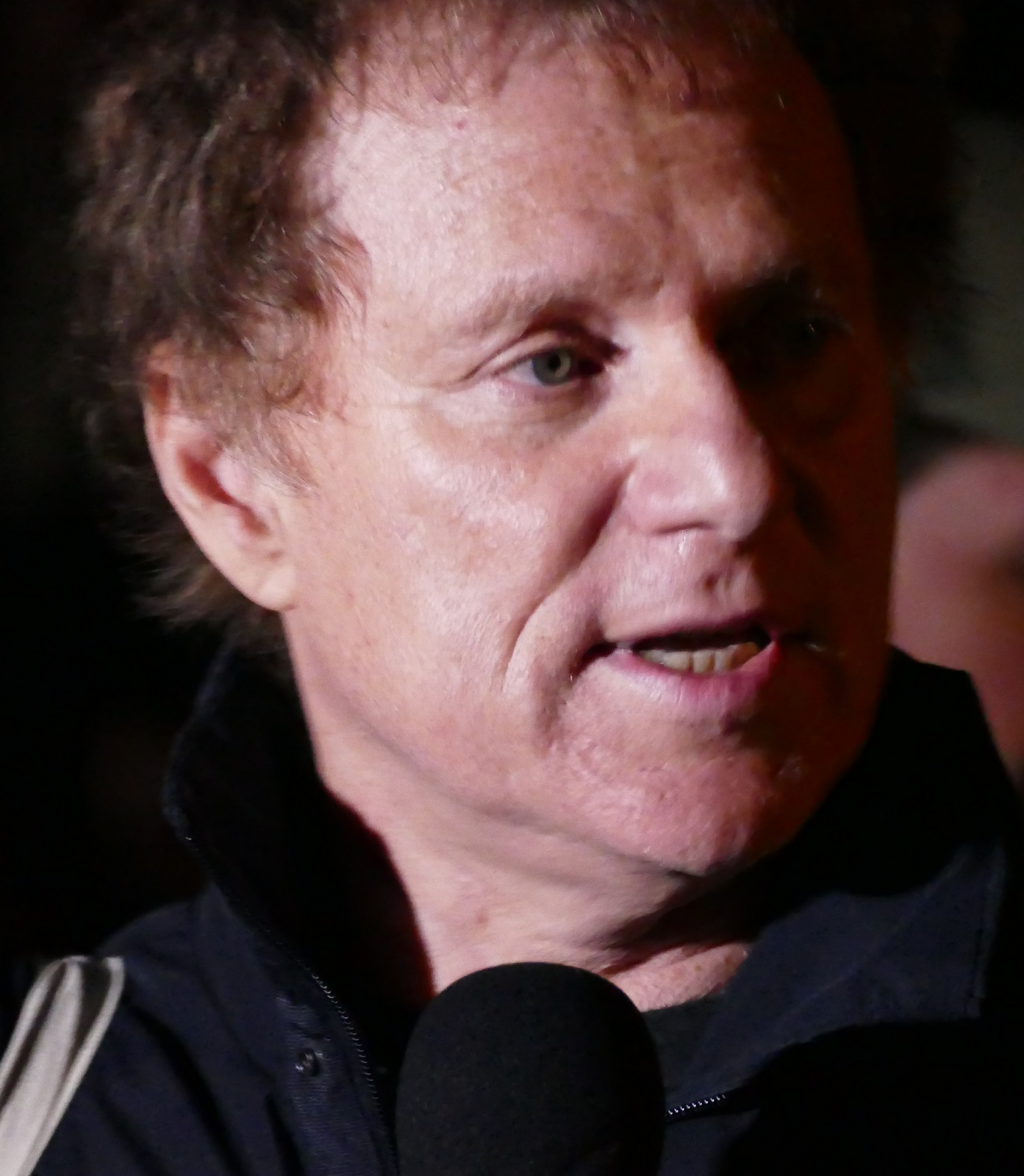
- Hribar in 2022
- Born: 19 March 1960; Celje, PR Slovenia, FPR Yugoslavia
- Died: 8 September 2023 (aged 63)
- Occupation(s): Radio and television presenter, comedian, impressionist
- Known for: Radio Ga Ga

Aleksander "Sašo" Hribar (19 March 1960 – 8 September 2023) was a Slovenian radio and television presenter and comedian. His best-known contribution was as a satirist and impressionist on the radio show Radio Ga Ga. He was among the most popular radio personalities in Slovenia.

== Life and career ==
Sašo Hribar was born in Celje on 19 March 1960. He spent his childhood in Grosuplje, and after finishing primary school he attended Poljane Grammar School. He then studied metallurgy in Ljubljana, but did not complete his studies.

In 1985, after an audition and voice training, he started his career as a radio presenter at Radio Slovenia. During a night program, he introduced and conversed with a fictional character referred to as a bioenergetitian. After positive feedback from the listeners, the radio show Radio Ga Ga was launched on Friday, 6 April 1990, on the third program; the show has been thereafter broadcast each Friday and has moved to the first program. He also produced other radio programs, including Moja soseska (My Neighbourhood) on Val 202.

Hribar also worked as a television presenter. In the early 1990s, he hosted the Titanik program on TV Slovenia, and later the programs Hri-bar and Na svoji žemlji. As the representative of the employees in the Program Council of RTV Slovenia, he was deeply involved in the internal politics of the institution. He also participated in broader political debates. In 2023, he sparked controversy by claiming that there had been no war for Slovenia.

Hribar died from a heart attack on 8 September 2023, at the age of 63. Just a few hours prior to his death, he had recorded the first episode of the new season of Radio Ga Ga. Prominent figures, including President Nataša Pirc Musar and Prime Minister Robert Golob expressed their condolences and reflected on Hribar's contributions to Slovenian satire and radio.

== Awards ==
In 2006, Hribar received the Ježek Award for creative achievement for the shows Radio Ga-ga and Hri-bar. He also received nine media Viktor Awards and a Gong of Popularity.
