= Praproče pri Temenici =

Praproče pri Temenici Praproče (until 1955)
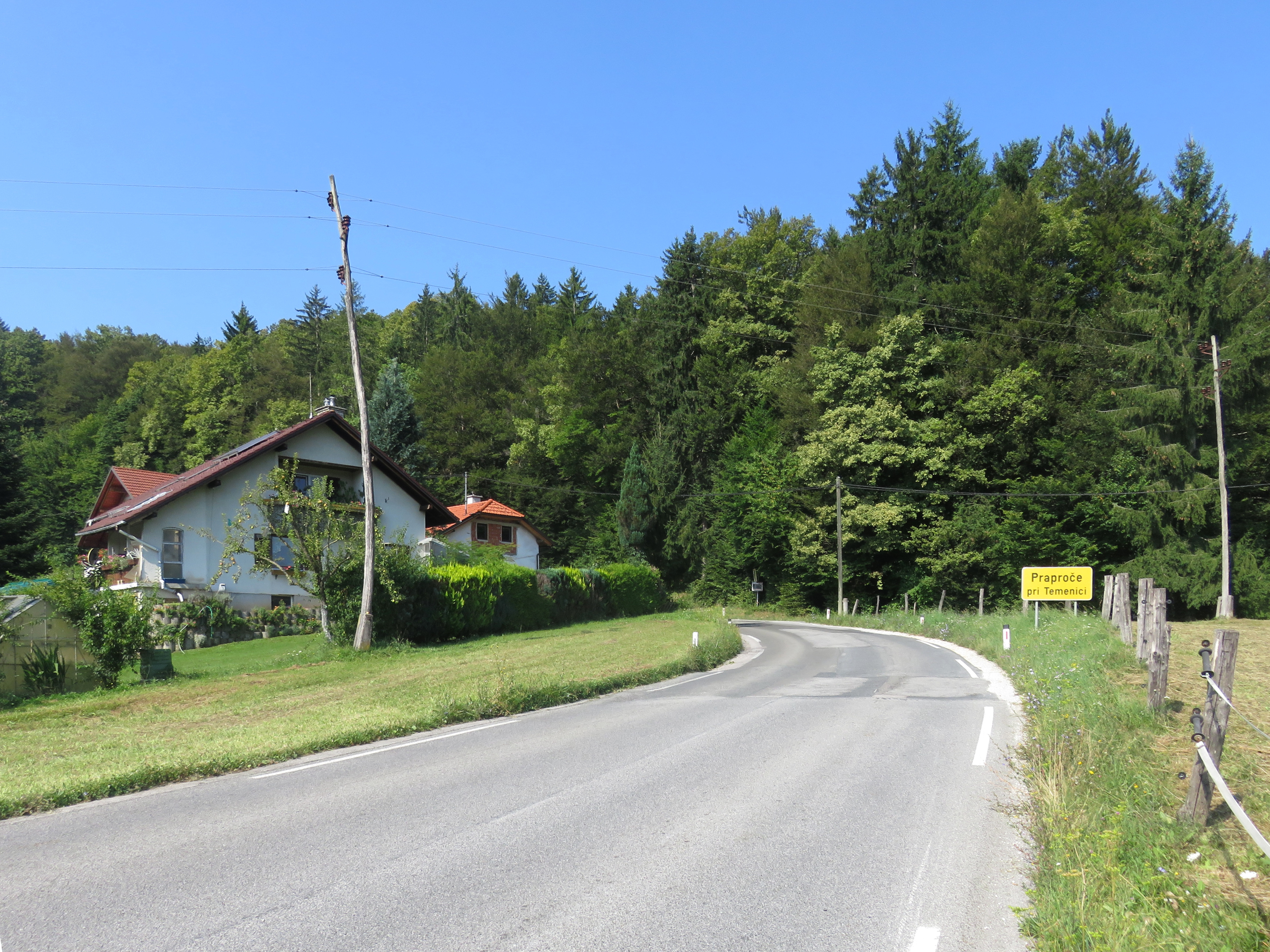

- Location in Slovenia
- Coordinates: 45°57′54.74″N 14°52′52.64″E
- Country: Slovenia
- Traditional region: Lower Carniola
- Statistical region: Central Slovenia
- Municipality: Ivančna Gorica

Area
  - Total: 0.41 km^{2} (0.16 sq mi)
- Elevation: 351.1 m (1,152 ft)

Population (2002)
  - Total: 44

Praproče pri Temenici (pronounced [ˈpɾaːpɾɔtʃɛ pɾi ˈteːmɛnitsi]; in older sources also Prapreče, German: Prapretshe) is a small settlement northeast of Šentvid pri Stični in the Municipality of Ivančna Gorica in central Slovenia. The area is part of the historical region of Lower Carniola. The municipality is now included in the Central Slovenia Statistical Region.

== Name ==
The name of the settlement was changed from Praproče to Praproče pri Temenici in 1955. In the past the German name was Prapretshe.

== Cultural heritage ==
Two small roadside chapels in the settlement are dedicated to the Virgin Mary and Saint Anthony of Padua and were built in the early 20th century.
