= Louis Adamic =

Slovene-American author and translator

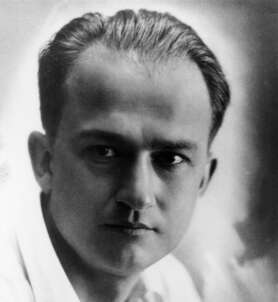
- Born: Alojzij Adamič; March 23, 1898; Praproče pri Grosupljem, Austro-Hungarian Empire (present-day Slovenia)
- Died: September 4, 1951 (aged 53); Riegelsville, New Jersey, United States
- Occupations: Author, translator
- Awards: Anisfield-Wolf Book Award for From Many Lands

Louis Adamic (Note: Adamic told The Literary Digest: "My name is pronounced in this country (America) exactly as the word Adamic, pertaining to Adam: a-dam′-ik." His original surname was Adamič, pronounced in Slovenian a-DAH-mich.) (Slovene: Alojzij Adamič; March 23, 1898 (Note: The year 1899 is often cited and is also written on Adamic's tombstone, but is incorrect. It was written in Adamič's certificate of origin by the mayor in Grosuplje in 1913, in order to enable Adamic to leave Austro-Hungarian Empire, which did not allow 15-year-old boys to leave the country, because they were to enter the army. The correct year is written in the register of births of the Parish of Žalna.) – September 4, 1951) was a Slovene-American author and translator, mostly known for writing about and advocating for ethnic diversity of the United States.

== Background ==
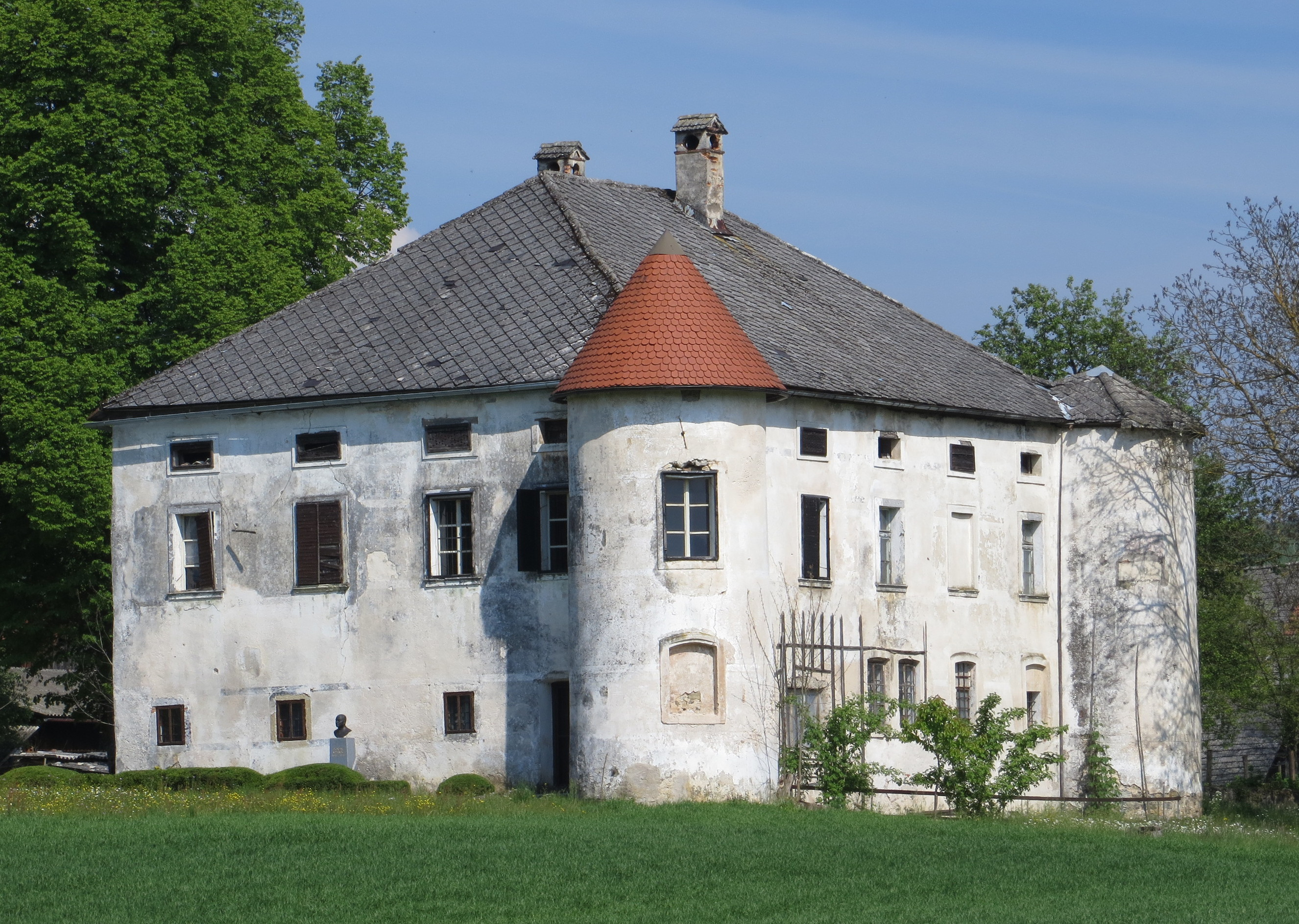
Praproče Manor, birthplace of Louis Adamic

Louis Adamic was born at Praproče Mansion in Praproče pri Grosupljem in the region of Lower Carniola, in what is now Slovenia (then part of the Austro-Hungarian Empire). He was baptized Alojzij Adamič. The oldest son of the peasants Anton and Ana Adamič, he was given a limited childhood education at the city school and, in 1909, entered the primary school at Ljubljana. Early in his third year he joined a secret students' political club associated with the Yugoslav Nationalistic Movement that had recently sprung up in the South-Slavic provinces of Austria-Hungary.

Swept up in a bloody demonstration in November 1913, Adamic was briefly jailed, expelled from school, and barred from any government educational institution. He was admitted to the Jesuit school in Ljubljana, but was unable to bring himself to go. "No more school for me. I was going to America," Adamic wrote. "I did not know how, but I knew that I would go."

On December 31, 1913, at the age of 15, Adamic emigrated to the United States.

He finally settled in a heavily ethnic Croatian fishing community of San Pedro, California. He became a naturalized United States citizen in 1918 as Louis Adamic.

== Career ==
Adamic first worked as a manual laborer and later at a Yugoslavian daily newspaper, Narodni Glas ("The Voice of the Nation"), that was published in New York. As an American soldier he participated in combat on the Western front during the First World War. After the war he worked as a journalist and professional writer.

All of Adamic's writings are based on his labor experiences in America and his former life in Slovenia. He achieved national acclaim in America in 1934 with his book The Native's Return, which was a bestseller directed against King Alexander's regime in the Kingdom of Yugoslavia. This book gave many Americans their first real knowledge of the Balkans. In it, Adamic predicted that America would prosper by eventually "going left", i.e. adopting socialism.

He received the Guggenheim Fellowship award in 1932. During the Second World War he had supported the Yugoslav National liberation struggle and the establishment of a socialist Yugoslav federation. He founded the United Committee of South-Slavic Americans in support of Marshal Tito. From 1949 he was a corresponding member of the Slovenian Academy of Sciences and Arts.

From 1940 onwards he served as editor of the magazine Common Ground. Adamic was the author of Dynamite: The Story of Class Violence in America (1931); Laughing in the Jungle: The Autobiography of an Immigrant in America (1932); The Native's Return: An American Immigrant Visits Yugoslavia and Discovers His Old Country (1934); Grandsons: A Story of American Lives (1935, novel); Cradle of Life: The Story of One Man's Beginnings (1936, novel); The House in Antigua (1937, travel); My America (1938); From Many Lands (1940); Two-Way Passage (1941); What's Your Name? (1942); My Native Land (1943); Nation of Nations (1945); and The Eagle and the Roots (1950). Maxim Lieber was his literary agent, 1930–1931 and in 1946. In 1941, Adamic won the Anisfield-Wolf Book Award for From Many Lands.

Adamic was strongly opposed to the foreign policy followed by British Prime Minister Winston Churchill, and in 1946 wrote Dinner at the White House, which purported to be an account of a dinner party given by President Franklin D. Roosevelt at which Adamic and Churchill had both been present. After the proofs had been passed by publishers Harper and Brothers, an additional footnote was inserted in pages 151 and 152 which claimed that Churchill had opposed the National Liberation Front in Greece because they intended to scale down the rate of interest Greece was paying to Hambros Bank. The footnote further claimed that Hambros had "bailed Winston Churchill out of bankruptcy in 1912". The footnote appeared in the book when it was published, and a copy was circulated to every British Member of Parliament; when Churchill was alerted, he instructed his solicitors to issue a writ for libel. Harper and Brothers admitted the statement was untrue and Adamic also withdrew the claim and apologised; a substantial sum of damages was paid, reported by the Daily Express as £5,000. As of 2011 the copy of Dinner at the White House in the British Library is held in the Suppressed Safe collection, inaccessible to readers.

His support for the Tito regime led to him being targeted by Nevada Senator Pat McCarran, who between May and September 1949, chaired a subcommittee to expose Soviet sympathizers among ethnic communities.

== Death ==
In 1951, he was found shot in his home in the Riegelsville section of Pohatcong Township, New Jersey, with his house burning and with a rifle in his hand. It was supposed by assistant Hunterdon County physician Dr. John Fuhrmann to be suicide. However, State Police Lieutenant J.J. Harris implied that foul play was a possibility. Found in Adamic's pocket by the police was a newspaper clipping of a story headlined "Adamic Red Spy, Woman Charges."

Herbert Heisel, Hunterdon County Prosecutor, claimed that there was no reason to contradict the initial report of a suicide after further investigative and laboratory reports.

John Roy Carlson, present at the burial of Adamic, said he believed Adamic was murdered by the Soviet Government, who were threatened by the impending publication of The Eagle and the Roots. Other unnamed friends of Adamic were reported to have said that he had been threatened due to his support for Marshal Tito following Yugoslavia's recent exit from the Soviet Bloc.

Anton Smole, of Tanjug, alleged that Adamic had told of him of multiple occasions in which unknown men had threatened Adamic over his public sympathies as a writer for Titoism and the anti-Stalinist Left. Included in these claims is a reported visit to Adamic's farmhouse in October 1949 from an unknown man who warned him to stop submitting magazine articles that were friendly to Yugoslavia. Reportedly, Adamic had also been beaten severely on a California beach sometime in 1951, and left with the warning that he would be murdered if he continued writing about Yugoslavia.

Ethel Sharp, Adamic's typist, claimed he had told her of an incident in October 1950 in which four unidentified men visited Adamic's home and threateningly inquired about the progress of The Eagle and the Roots. However, Adamic was apparently unfazed by the visit. The episode had not been reported to the authorities.

In 1957, Howard L. Yowell, the then-current owner of the house where Adamic died, found $12,350 cash in a tin box within a wall of the farmhouse. The Flemington Police speculated that the money had belonged to Adamic.

== Legacy ==
According to John McAleer's Edgar Award-winning Rex Stout: A Biography (1977), it was the influence of Adamic that led Rex Stout to make his fictional detective Nero Wolfe a native of Montenegro, in what was then Yugoslavia. Stout and Adamic were friends and frequent political allies, and Stout expressed uncertainty to McAleer about the circumstances of Adamic's death. In any case, the demise seems to have inspired Stout's 1954 novel The Black Mountain, in which Nero Wolfe returns to his homeland to hunt down the killers of an old friend.

== Writings ==
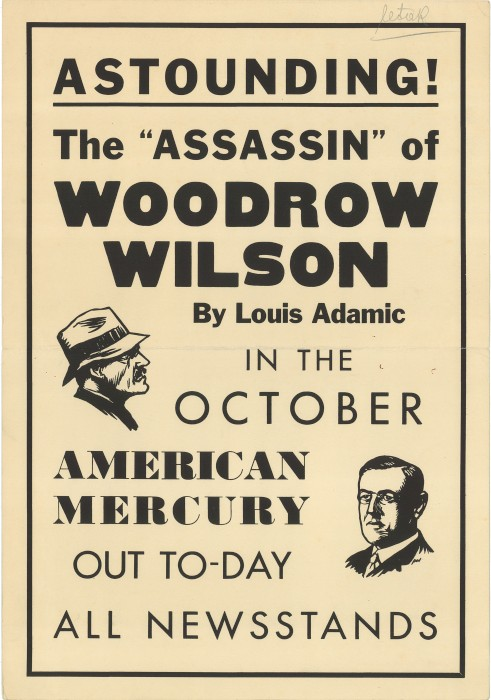
1930 poster promoting the appearance of one of Adamic's articles in The American Mercury magazine

Articles in Harper's Magazine:

- "Racketeers and Organized Labor" (1930)
- "Sabotage" (1930)
- "Tragic Towns of New England" (1931)
- "The Land of Promise" (1931)
- "The Collapse of Organized Labor" (1931)
- "Wedding in Carniola" (1932)
- "Home Again from America," (1932)
- "Death in Carniola" (1933)
- "Thirty Million New Americans" (1934)
- "Education on a Mountain" (1936)
- "Aliens and Alien-Baiters" (1936)
- "The Millvale Apparition" (1938)
- "Death in Front of the Church" (1943)

Books:

Translator:

- Yugoslav Proverbs (1923)
- Yerney's Justice by Ivan Cankar (1926)
- Struggle by anonymous Yugoslav informants (1934)
- Yugoslavia and Italy by Josip Broz Tito (1944)
- Liberation. Death to Fascism! Liberty to the People! Picture Story of the Yugoslav People's Epic Struggle against the Enemy—To Win Unity and a Decent Future, 1941–1945 (1945)

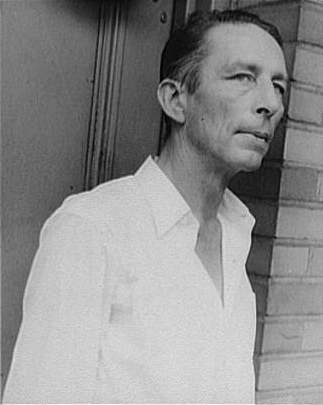
Adamic wrote a biography of Robinson Jeffers (here in 1937, photographed by Carl Van Vechten, via Library of Congress)

Author:

- Truth about Los Angeles (1927)
- Word of Satan in the Bible: Christians Rightly Regard Ecclesiastes Suspiciously (1928)
- Robinson Jeffers: A Portrait (1929, 1970, 1977, 1983)
- Dynamite: The Story of Class Violence in America (1931, 1960, 1976, 1983, 1984, 2008) ISBN 978-1-904-85974-1, 1904859747
- Boj (1969)
- Laughing in the Jungle: The Autobiography of an Immigrant in America (1932, 1969) ISBN 978-0-405-00503-9
  - Smeh v džungli: Avtobiografija ameriškega priseljenca (Slovenian - transl Stanko Leben 1933) COBISS 383817, Slovenian - transl Rapa Šuklje) COBISS 176926
  - Smijeh u džungli : autobiografija jednog američkog useljenika (1932)
- The Native's Return: an American Immigrant Visits Yugoslavia and Discovers His Old Country (1934, 1943, 1975) ISBN 0282571906, 978-0282571900
  - Vrnitev v rodni kraj (1962) COBISS 3367681
- Grandsons: A Story of American Lives (1935, 1983)
- Lucas, King of the Balucas (1935)
- Cradle of Life: The Story of One Man's Beginnings (1936)
- House in Antigua: A Restoration (1937)
- My America, 1928–1938 (1938, 1976) ISBN 0781280028, 978-0781280020
- America and the Refugees (1939, 1940)
- From Many Lands (1940)
- Plymouth Rock and Ellis Island: Summary of a Lecture (1940)
- Two-Way Passage (1941)
- Inside Yugoslavia (1942)
- What's Your Name? (1942)
- Foreign-Born Americans and the War with George F. Addes (1943)
- My Native Land (1943) ISBN 9781789127867
- Nation of Nations (1945)
- Dinner at the White House (1946) ISBN 1296826864, 978-1296826864
- The Eagle and the Roots (1952, 1970) ISBN 0837138094
