= The Natural History of Revolution =

1927 sociology text

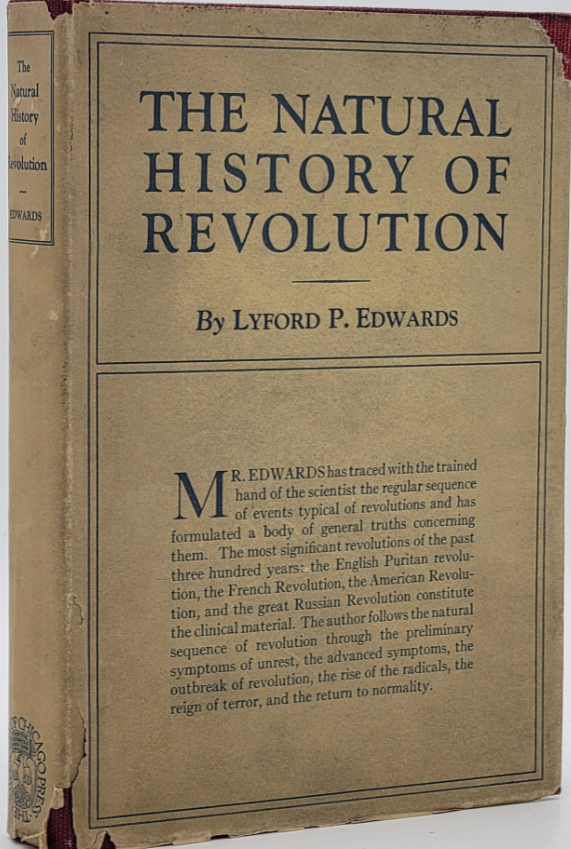
- Title page for The Natural History of Revolution (1927)
- Author: Lyford P. Edwards
- Genre: Sociology
- Publication date: 1927

The Natural History of Revolution is a sociology treatise written by The Reverend Lyford P. Edwards, an American Episcopalian priest, in 1927. It formed part of the corpus of the Chicago School's work on the causes and effects of revolution.

While the work was later overshadowed by other works on revolutionary sociology (notably Anatomy of Revolution by Crane Brinton, who praised Natural History as one "of the best introductions to the subject available in English."), it was seminal in elaborating upon the potential stages of revolution and the relationship between early moderates and radicals who may usurp the power of the revolution.

Using the cases of the English, American, French and Russian Revolutions, Edwards theorized that revolutions were not the cause of social change but merely one of the extreme symptoms of previously understated social change.

Edwards was an Episcopal priest, born in 1882, who was ordained at a time when there were close connections between the University of Chicago Divinity school and the Department of Sociology. He came under the influence of the theories of Robert E. Park, to whom he dedicated this work. He taught at St. Stephen's College from 1920 to 1947.
