= Grosuplje =

- Town
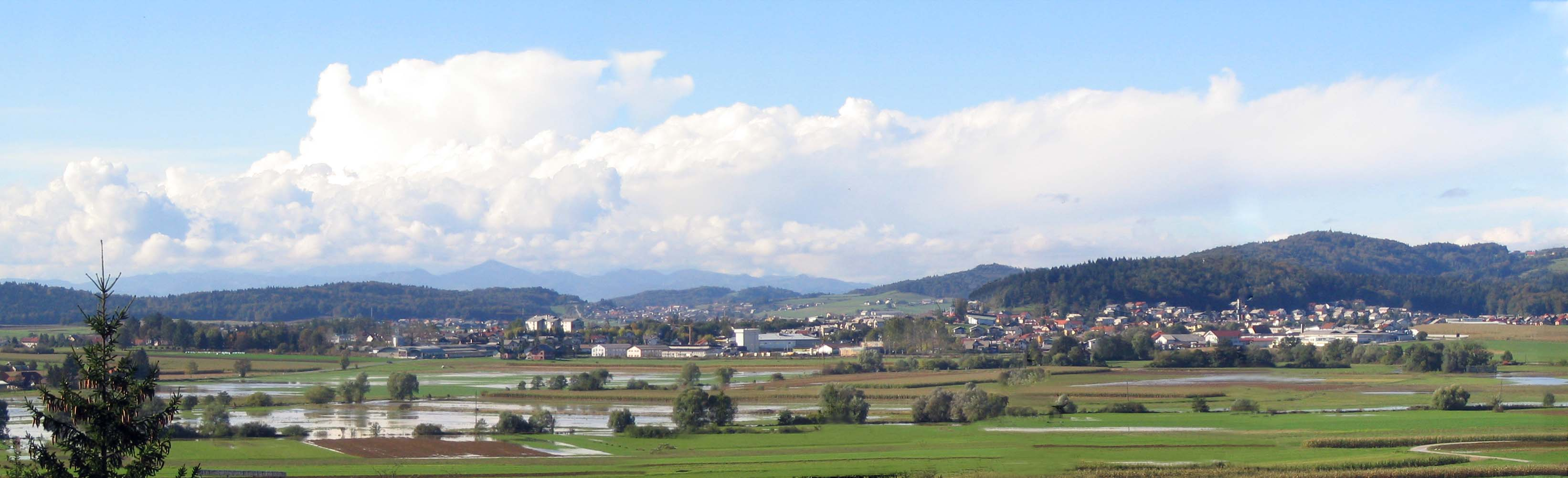
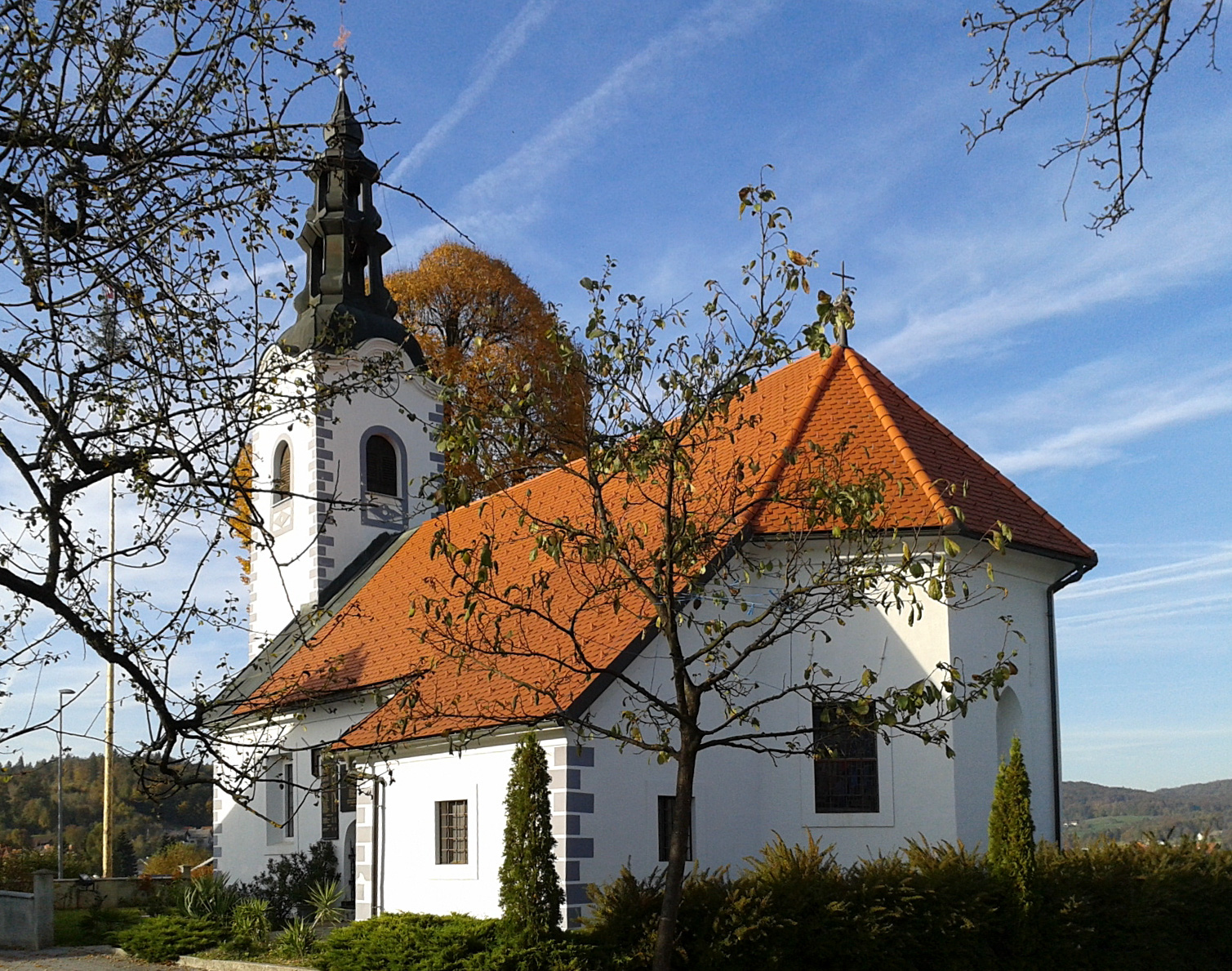
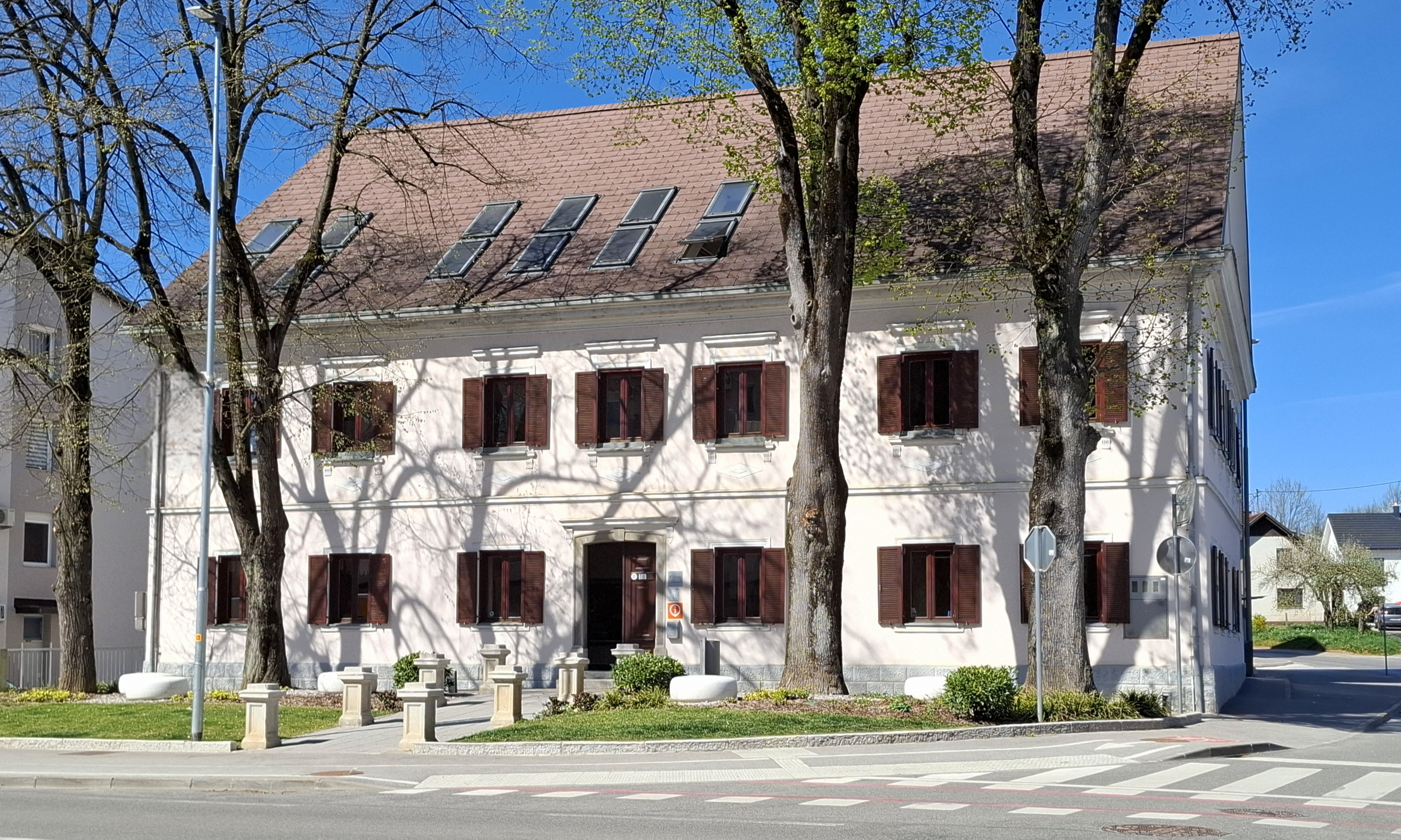
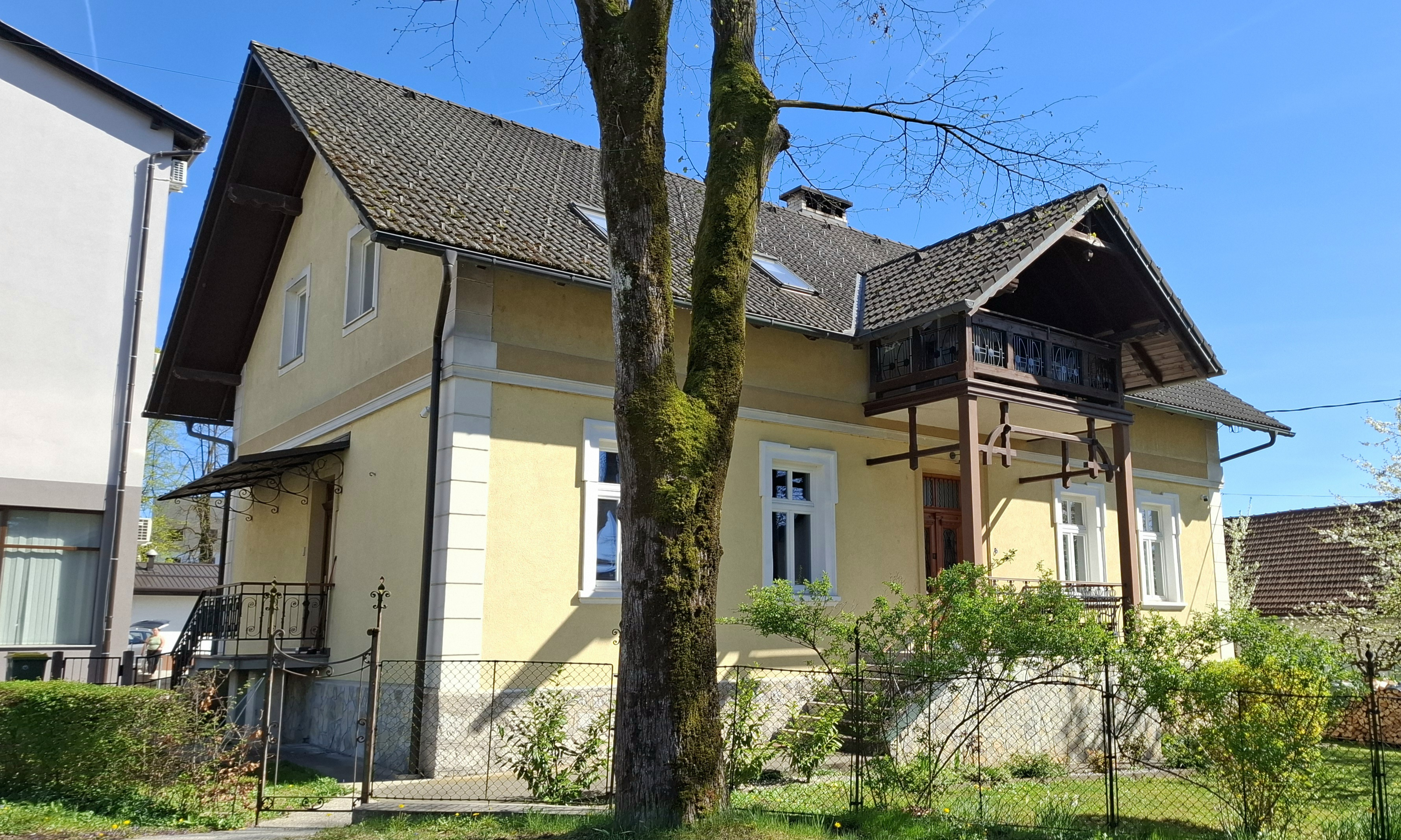
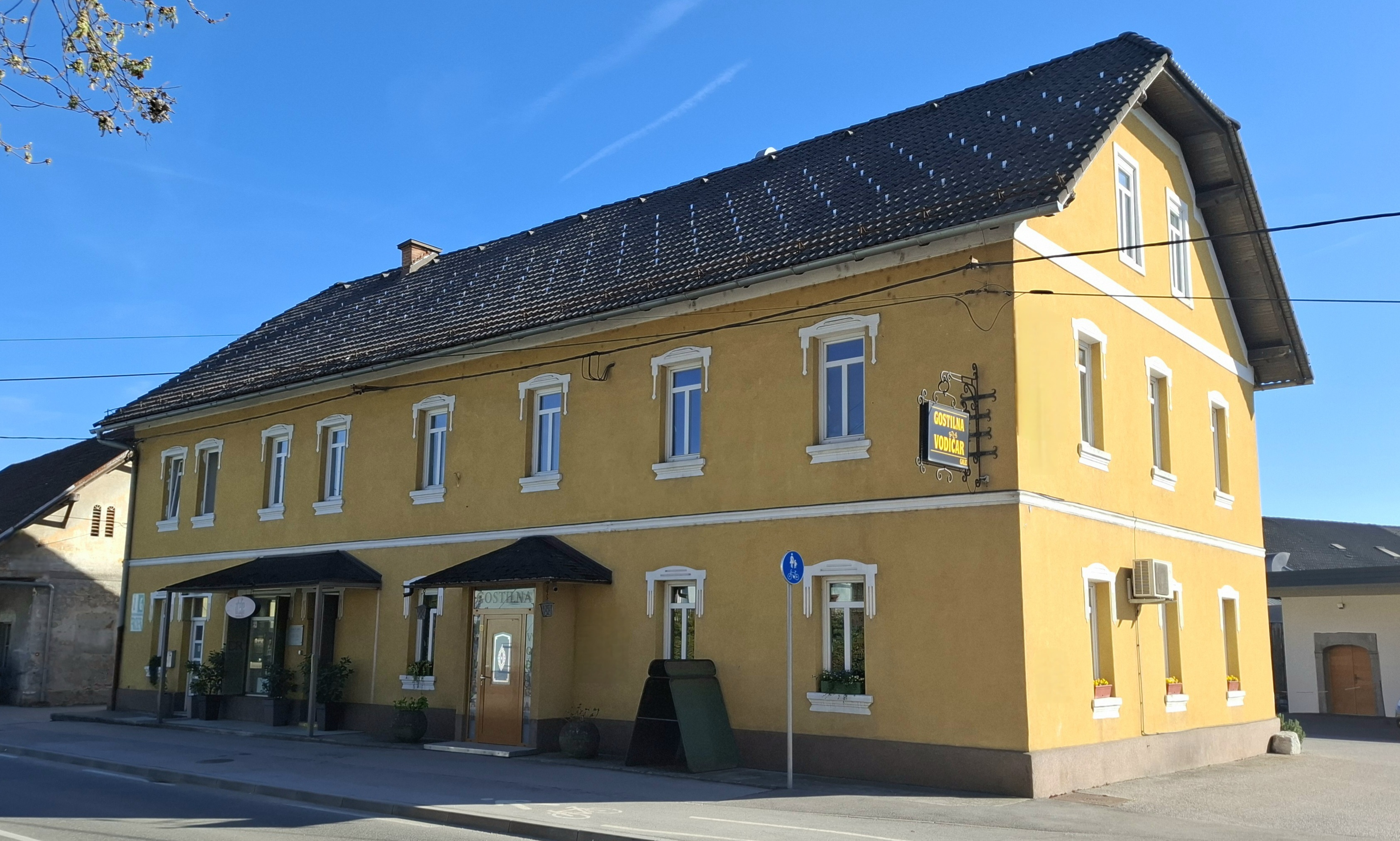
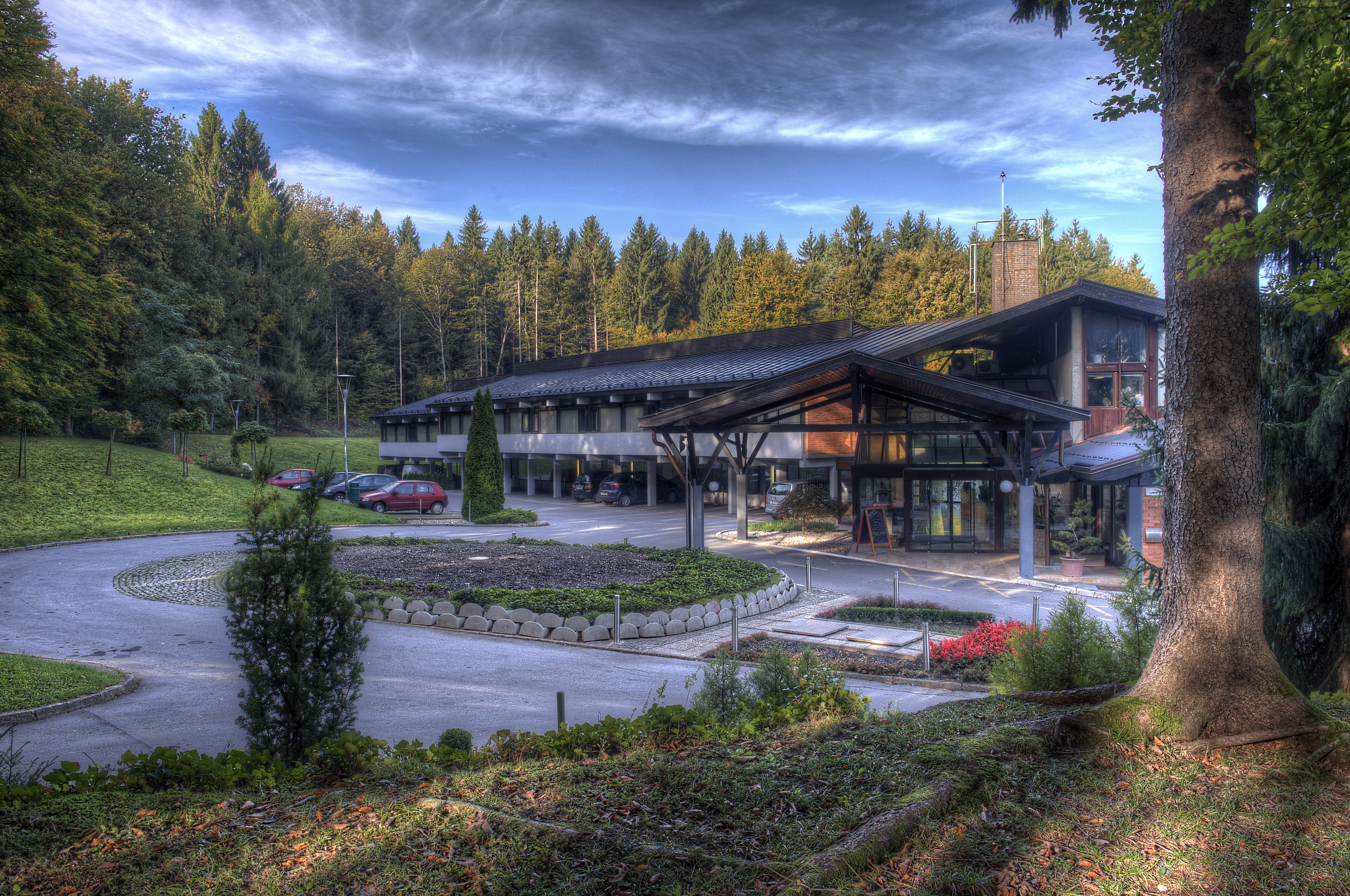
- From top, left to right: Grosuplje skyline, St. Michael's Church, Koščak house, Old center house, Vodičar restaurant, Admiral Hotel

- Flag Coat of arms

- Location in Slovenia
- Coordinates: 45°57′18.45″N 14°39′22.32″E
- Country: Slovenia
- Traditional region: Lower Carniola
- Statistical region: Central Slovenia
- Municipality: Grosuplje

Government
  - Mayor: Peter Verlič (SDS)

Area
  - Total: 5.3 km^{2} (2.0 sq mi)
- Elevation: 343.1 m (1,126 ft)

Population (2022)
  - Total: 7,501
- Time zone: UTC+1 (CET)
- Postal code: 1290
- Vehicle registration: LJ

Grosuplje (pronounced [ɡɾɔˈsùːpljɛ]; German: Großlupp) is a town in central Slovenia, in the northwest of the traditional region of Lower Carniola. It is the seat of the Municipality of Grosuplje and is part of the Central Slovenia Statistical Region. It has close ties to the nearby capital, Ljubljana.

== Name ==
Grosuplje was first attested in written sources in 1136 as Groslupp (and as Grasslupp in 1220–50, and Grazlup in 1249). The settlement is known as Grasuple in the local dialect. The etymological origin of the name is unclear. One theory derives it from *Graslupoje (selo/poľe)—literally, 'wet (village/field)', from the adjective *graslupъ. Another theory derives the name from Lombard *grass(ah)lauffja 'rapids' but is undermined by the lack of fast-flowing water in the area. Yet another theory derives it from the hypothetical Lombard name *Graslupus borrowed into Slavic as *Groslupъ, whereby *Groslupľe selo would literally mean 'Groslupъ's village'. In the past the German name was Großlupp.

== Mass grave ==
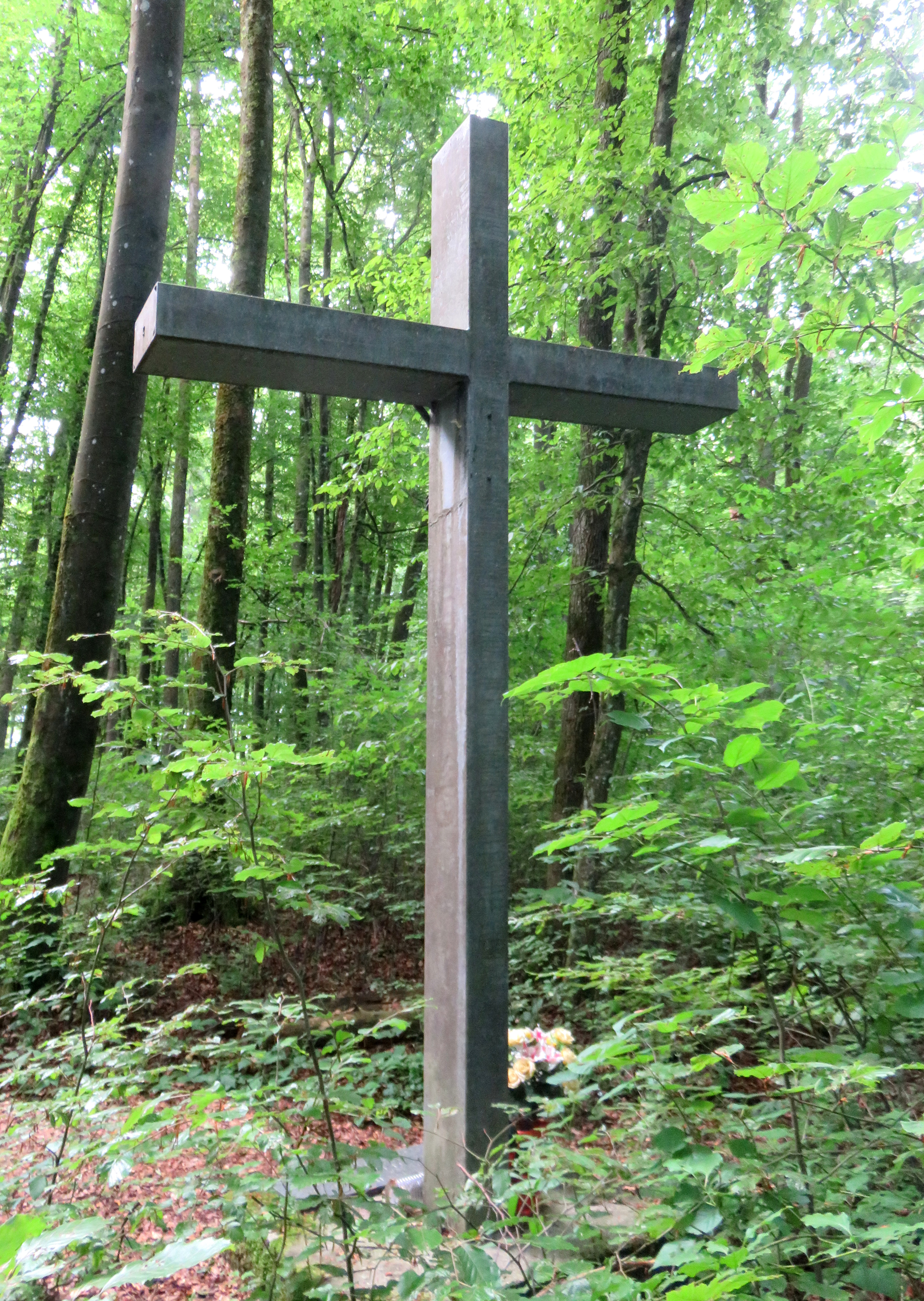
Koščak Hill Mass Grave marker

Grosuplje is the site of a mass grave associated with the Second World War. The Koščak Hill Mass Grave (Slovene: Grobišče Koščakov hrib) is located in the northern part of the town, on Koščak Hill—also known as Brinje Hill (Brinjski hrib). It contains the remains of 15 anticommunist militia members, mostly from the Dobrepolje karst polje, that were held as prisoners of war and murdered between 26 and 28 October 1943.

== Church ==
The parish church in the settlement is dedicated to Saint Michael and belongs to the Roman Catholic Archdiocese of Ljubljana. It was built in 1972 at a site close to an older building dedicated to the same saint.

Historical population
| Year | Pop. | ±% |
|---|---|---|
| 1948 | 929 | — |
| 1953 | 1,053 | +13.3% |
| 1961 | 1,544 | +46.6% |
| 1971 | 2,660 | +72.3% |
| 1981 | 4,605 | +73.1% |
| 1991 | 5,606 | +21.7% |
| 2002 | 6,050 | +7.9% |
| 2011 | 7,098 | +17.3% |
| 2021 | 7,607 | +7.2% |
Population size may be affected by changes in administrative divisions.

== Notable people ==
Notable people that were born or lived in Grosuplje include:

- Louis Adamic (1898–1951), Slovenian-American writer
- Ana Gale (1909–1944), poet
- Jože Gale (1913–2005), film director
- Sašo Hribar (1960–2023), media personality and comedian
- Janez Janša (born 1958), former prime minister of Slovenia
- Stane Valentinčič (1913–1995), veterinarian
- Aleksander Čeferin (born 1967), current president of UEFA

== Twin towns ==
- Kupres, Bosnia and Herzegovina
- Prokuplje, Serbia
