= Eugene M. Kayden =

Russian–American professor

- Occupation: Professor
- Known for: Promotion of Russian literature

Eugene Mark Kayden (1886–1977) was a professor emeritus of economics at Sewanee: The University of the South and a translator of Boris Pasternak's poems. Kayden, a pro-integrationist, declined an honorary degree from the university in protest of its decision to award another degree to noted segregationist Thomas R. Waring.

== Works ==
- The Co-operative Movement in Russia during the War (1929), co-authored with Alexis N. Antsiferov

=== Translations into English ===
- Poems by Boris Pasternak (1959, 1964 2nd ed.)
- Alexander Pushkin's Eugene Onegin (1964)
- Alexander Pushkin's Little Tragedies (1965)
- Michail Lermontov's The Demon and Other Poems (1965)
- Fyodor Tyutchev's Poems of Night and Day (1974)
- Last Translations; Russian Poems (1979)
- Vsevolod Garshin's Last Translations; Three Stories (1979)
