= France Adamič =

Slovene agronomist and author

France Adamič (4 October 1911 – 5 August 2004) was a Yugoslav agronomist and author of several books on horticulture. He was professor of arboriculture, pomology and introduction to farming on the university in Ljubljana from 1961 till 1981. He was researching domestic and foreign cultivars of fruit trees, their physiology, the technology of their cultivation, and the organization and economics of fruit tree plantations. Adamič graduated from the University of Belgrade, where he also completed his doctoral studies.

== Awards ==
- 1977: Kidrič Award
- 1982: Jesenko Award

== Bibliography ==
- 1961: Sadjarstvo I
- 1962: Sadjarstvo II
- 1963: Sadjarstvo III
- 1971: Naše sadje
- 1995: Kmetijski tehniški slovar I/b
