= Gabrje =

Gabrje is a Slovene place name that may refer to:

- Gabrje, Dobrova–Polhov Gradec, a village in the Municipality of Dobrova–Polhov Gradec, central Slovenia
- Gabrje, Novo Mesto, a village in the Municipality of Novo Mesto, southeastern Slovenia
- Gabrje, Sevnica, a village in the Municipality of Sevnica, central-eastern Slovenia
- Gabrje, Tolmin, a village in the Municipality of Tolmin, northwestern Slovenia
- Gabrje pod Limbarsko Goro, a village in the Municipality of Moravče, central Slovenia
- Gabrje pod Špilkom, a village in the Municipality of Lukovica, central Slovenia
- Gabrje pri Dobovi, a village in the Municipality of Brežice, southeastern Slovenia
- Gabrje pri Ilovi Gori, a village in the Municipality of Grosuplje, southeastern Slovenia
- Gabrje pri Jančah, a village in the City Municipality of Ljubljana, central Slovenia
- Gabrje pri Soteski, a village in the Municipality of Dolenjske Toplice, southeastern Slovenia
- Gabrje pri Stični, a village in the Municipality of Ivančna Gorica, southeastern Slovenia
