= Paradišče =

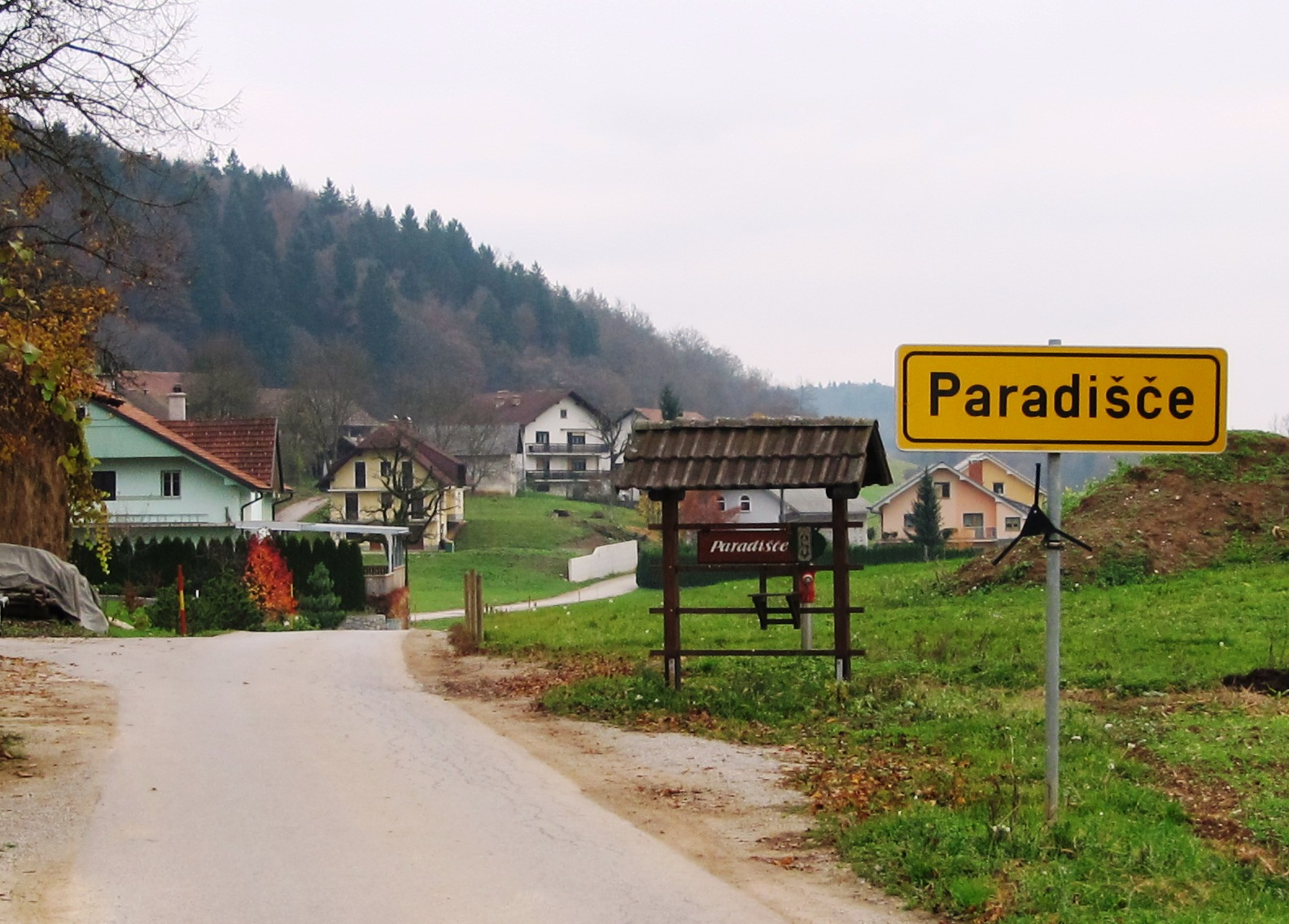

- Location in Slovenia
- Coordinates: 45°58′28.16″N 14°37′56.87″E
- Country: Slovenia
- Traditional region: Lower Carniola
- Statistical region: Central Slovenia
- Municipality: Grosuplje

Area
  - Total: 1.12 km^{2} (0.43 sq mi)
- Elevation: 353.3 m (1,159 ft)

Population (2002)
  - Total: 59

Paradišče (pronounced [paɾaˈdiːʃtʃɛ]; German: Paradeis) is a settlement just east of Šmarje–Sap in the Municipality of Grosuplje in central Slovenia. The area is part of the historical region of Lower Carniola. The municipality is now included in the Central Slovenia Statistical Region.

== Name ==
The settlement of Paradišče was first attested in written sources in 1686 as Paradis (and as Paradiſh in 1687, Paradatz in 1689, and Paradische in 1784–1787). Like similar place names (e.g., Paradiž), the name is derived from paradiž 'paradise', referring to the fertile quality of the land. The name was probably created with the suffix -išče (indicating a locality) and is a reduced form of *Paradižišče. In the past the German name was Paradeis.

== Wayside shrine ==
A small roadside chapel-shrine at the crossroads in the western part of the village dates to the late 19th century.

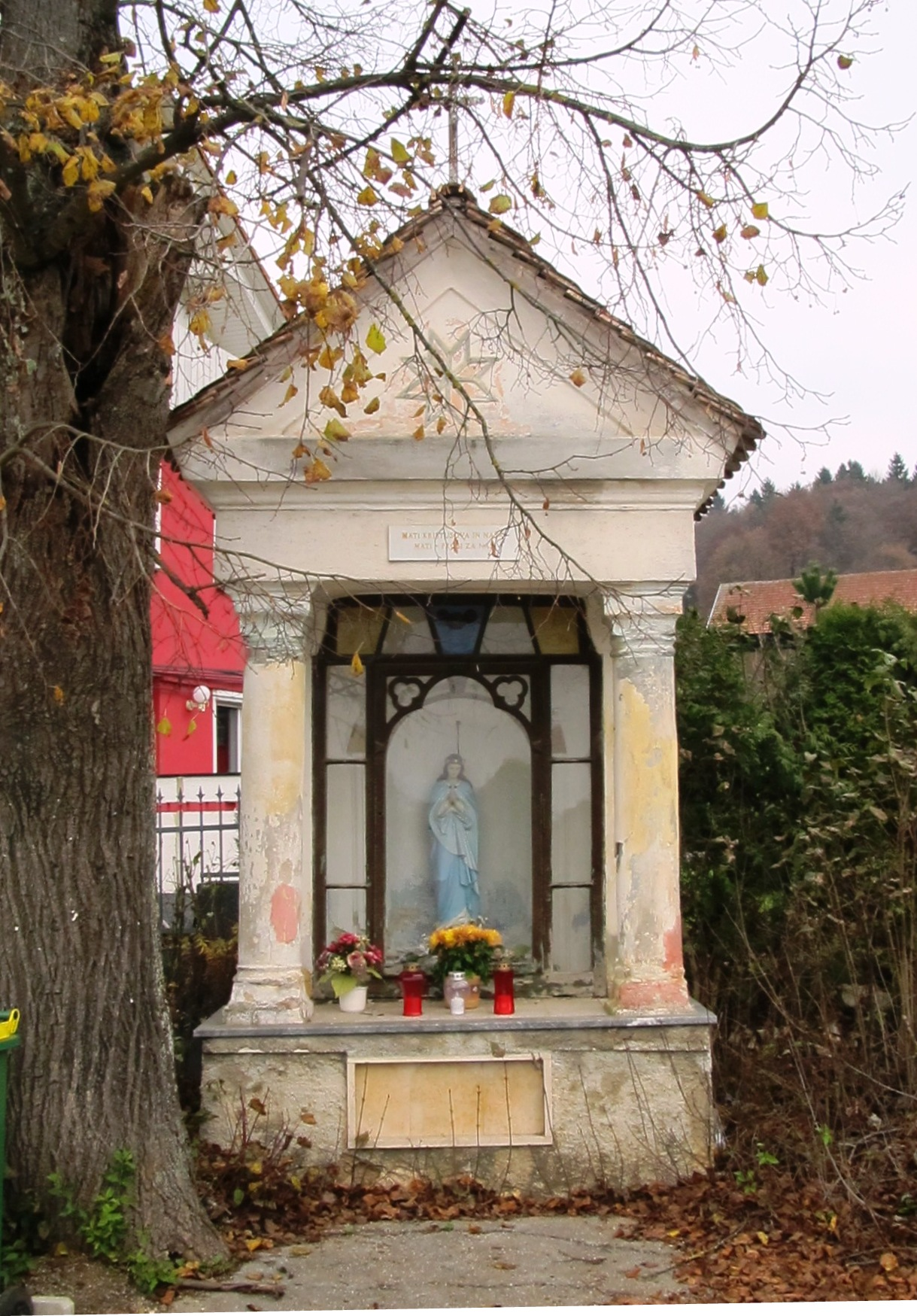
Chapel-shrine in Paradišče
