= Gatina =

Gatina may refer to:

- Gatina, Kenya
- Gatina, Slovenia
