= Podgorica pri Podtaboru =

Podgorica pri Podtaboru Podgorica (until 1953)
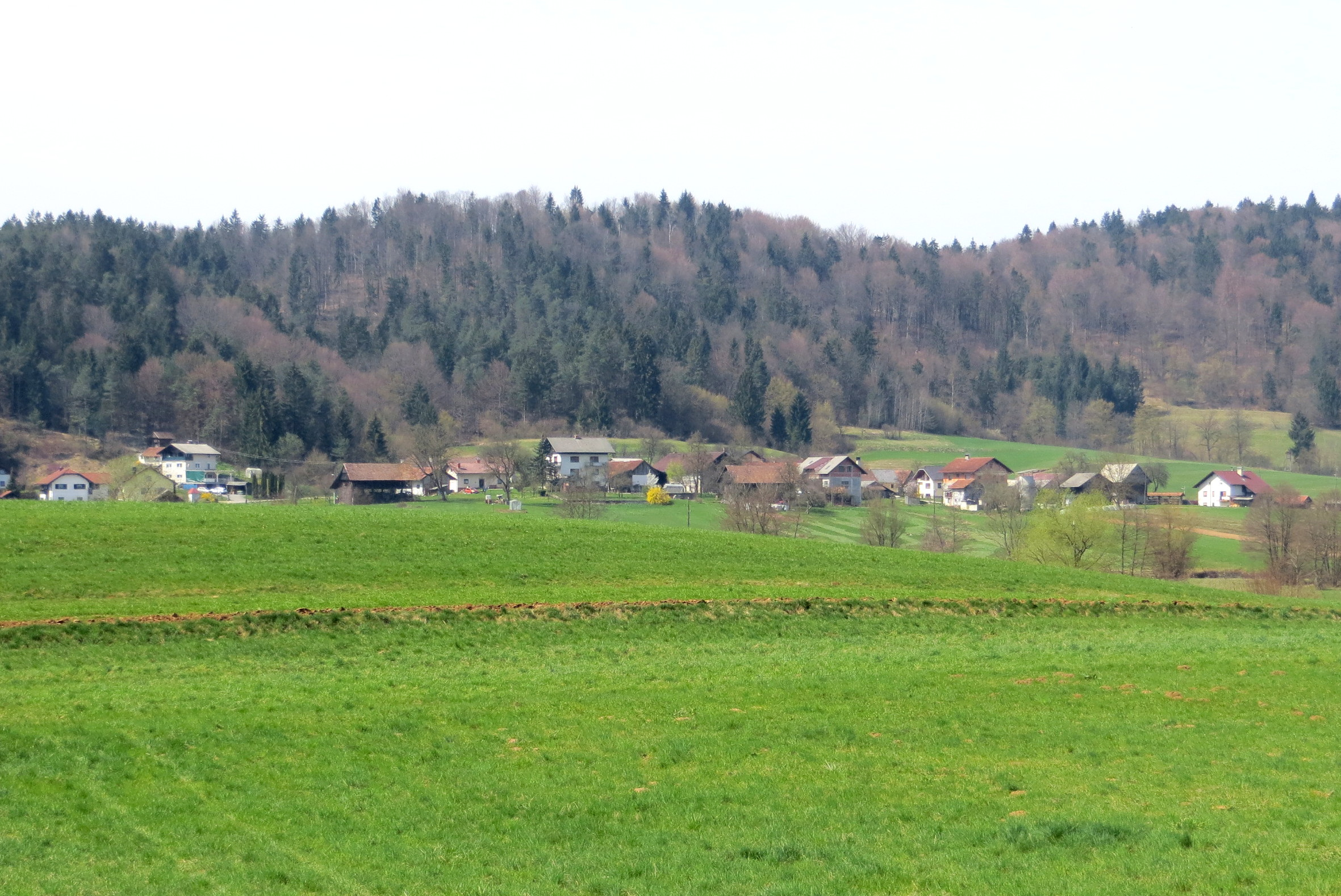

- Location in Slovenia
- Coordinates: 45°56′4.14″N 14°36′58.86″E
- Country: Slovenia
- Traditional region: Lower Carniola
- Statistical region: Central Slovenia
- Municipality: Grosuplje

Area
  - Total: 0.46 km^{2} (0.18 sq mi)
- Elevation: 346.3 m (1,136 ft)

Population (2002)
  - Total: 47

Podgorica pri Podtaboru (pronounced [pɔdɡɔˈɾiːtsa pɾi pɔˈtaːbɔɾju], in older sources also Mala Podgorica, German: Kleinpodgoriza) is a small settlement north of Šent Jurij in the Municipality of Grosuplje in central Slovenia. The area is part of the historical region of Lower Carniola. The municipality is now included in the Central Slovenia Statistical Region.

== Name ==
The name of the settlement was changed from Podgorica to Podgorica pri Podtaboru in 1953. The epithet pri Podtaboru 'near Podtabor' refers to Šent Jurij, which was named Podtabor from 1952 to 1992.

== Cultural heritage ==
A small roadside chapel-shrine in the village is dedicated to Saint Peter and dates to the early 20th century.
