= Dole pri Polici =

Dole pri Polici Dole (until 1953)
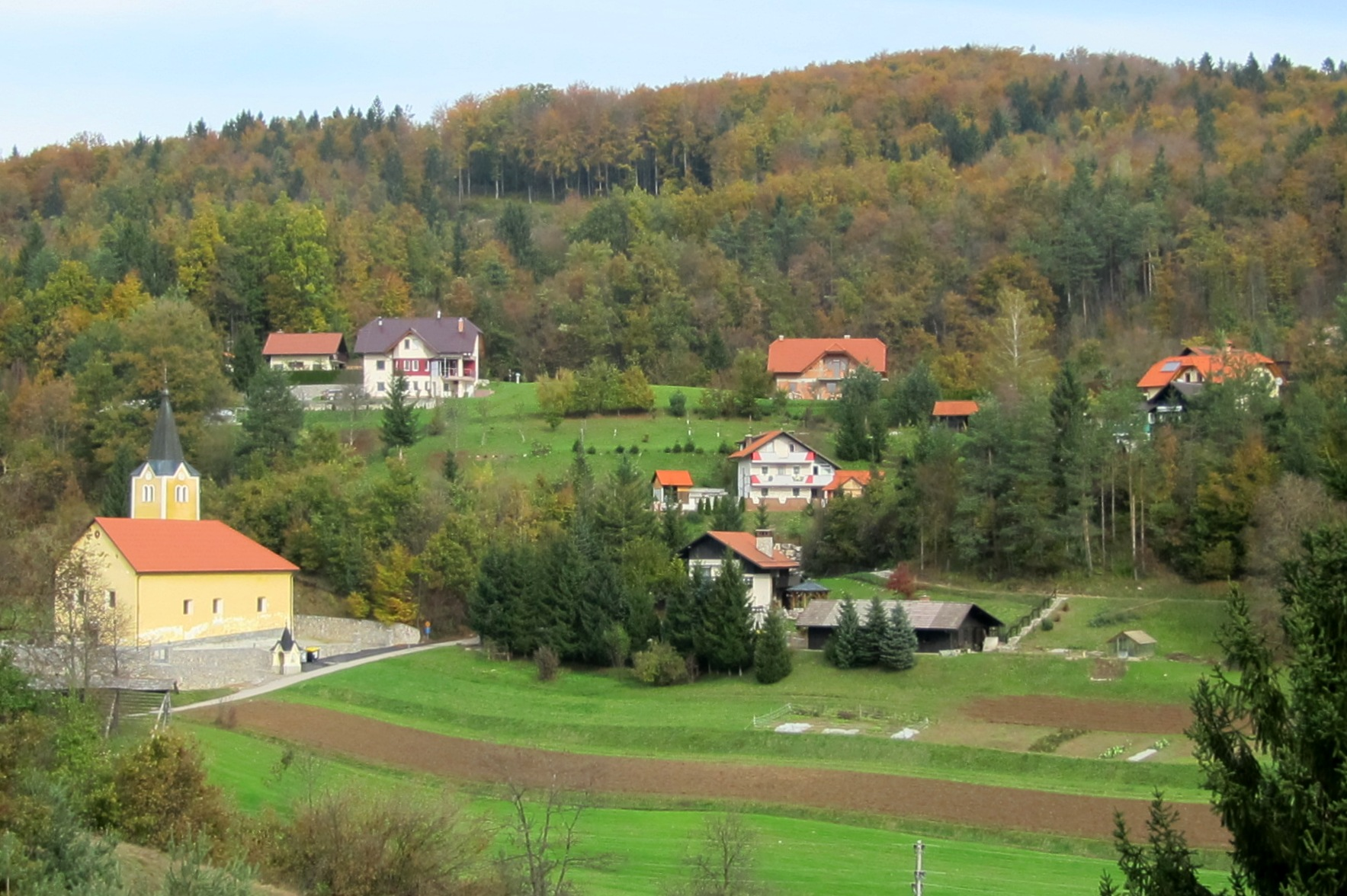

- Location in Slovenia
- Coordinates: 45°59′32.07″N 14°40′19.12″E
- Country: Slovenia
- Traditional region: Lower Carniola
- Statistical region: Central Slovenia
- Municipality: Grosuplje

Area
  - Total: 1.09 km^{2} (0.42 sq mi)
- Elevation: 440.9 m (1,447 ft)

Population (2002)
  - Total: 106

Dole pri Polici (pronounced [ˈdoːlɛ pɾi pɔˈliːtsi]) is a settlement northwest of Polica in the Municipality of Grosuplje in central Slovenia. The area is part of the historical region of Lower Carniola. The municipality is now included in the Central Slovenia Statistical Region.

== Name ==
The name of the settlement was changed from Dole to Dole pri Polici in 1953.

== Church ==
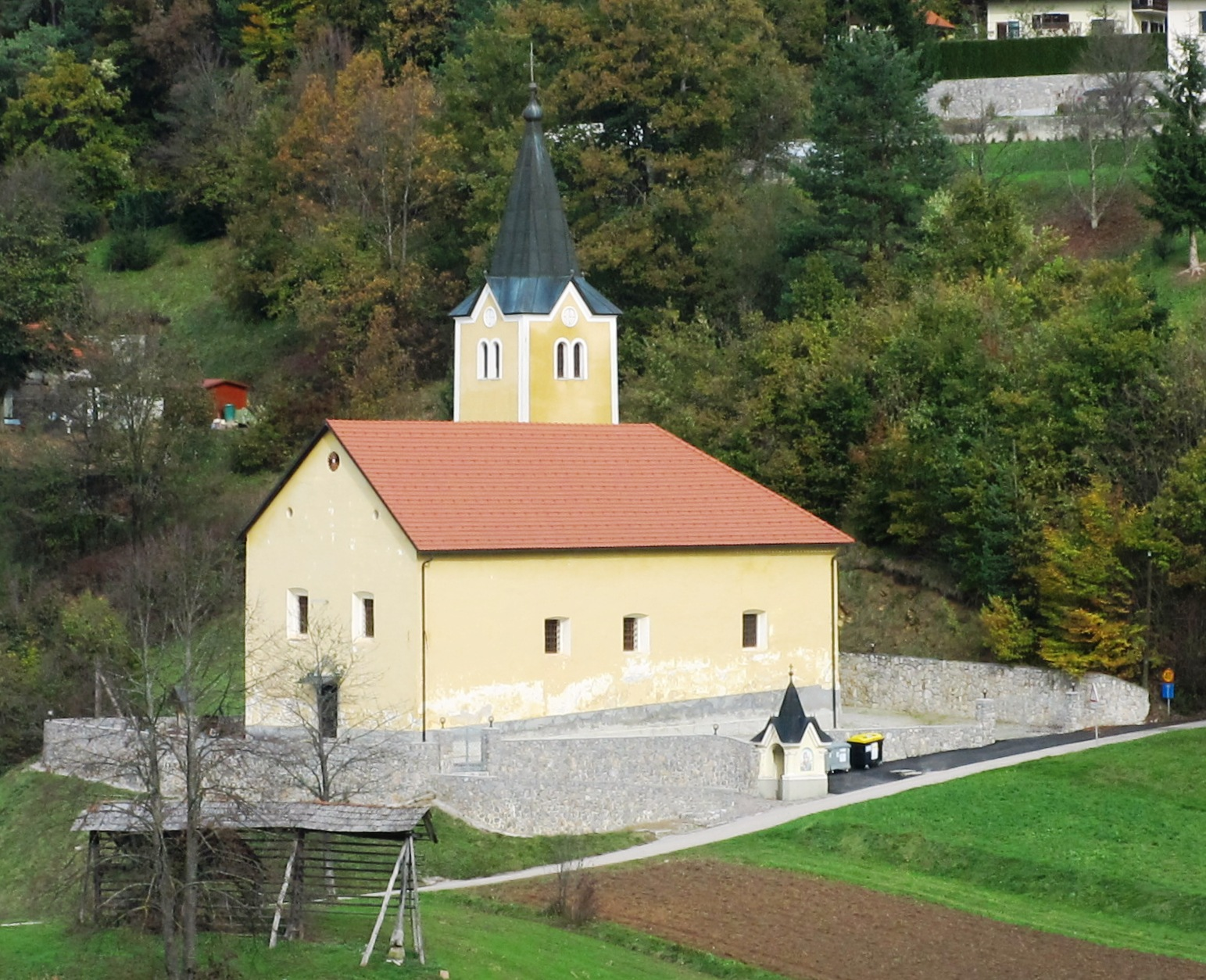
Saint Lucy's church

The local church is dedicated to Saint Lucy and belongs to the Parish of Polica. It was first mentioned in written documents dating to the mid-17th century. The church was originally a Gothic structure with a rectangular chancel, reworked in the Baroque style. The main altar dates to 1717 and was created by Jože Ambrožič; the side altars are the work of Štefan Šubic and Franz Götzl.

A shrine dedicated to Saint Lucy next to the church was built in the early 20th century. It stands above a well with reputed healing powers, and two ladles hang in front of its niche to scoop water for washing the eyes. In the niche, there is a 115 cm (45 in)-high statue of Saint Lucy holding a book and her eyes in her left hand, and a sword in her right hand.

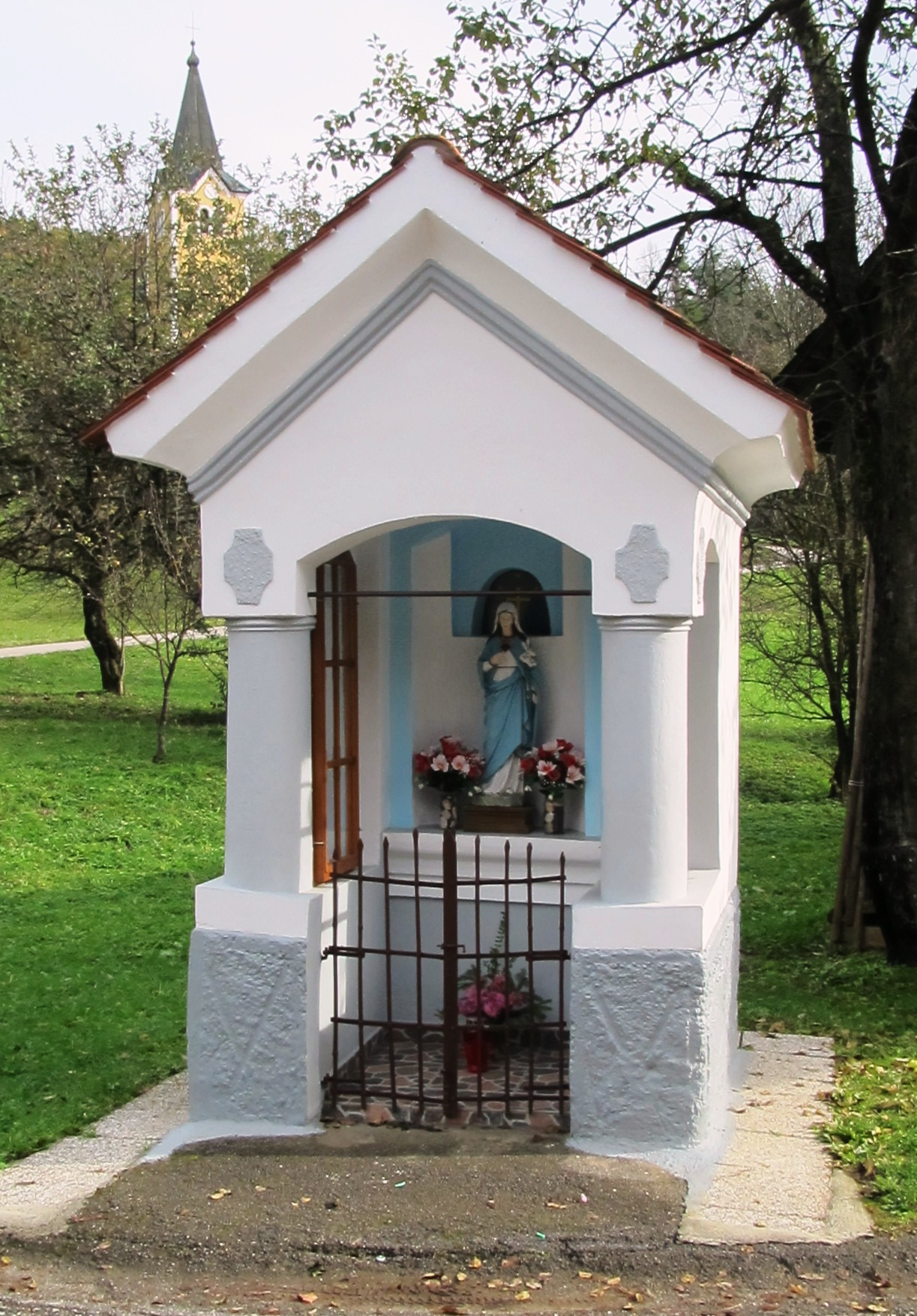
Chapel-shrine at crossroads

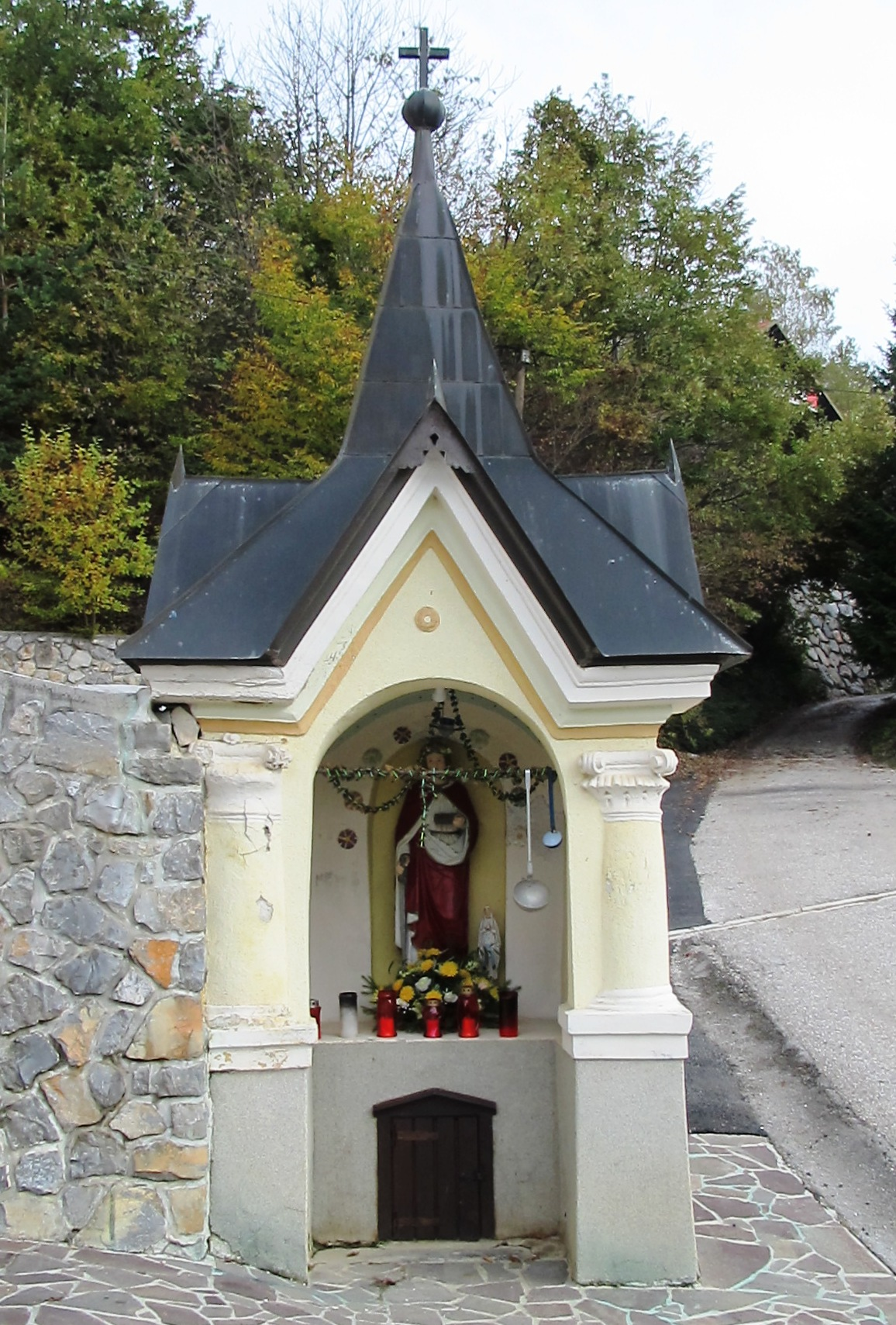
Saint Lucy's shrine next to church and cemetery
