= Mala Loka pri Višnji Gori =

Mala Loka pri Višnji Gori Mala Loka (until 1953)
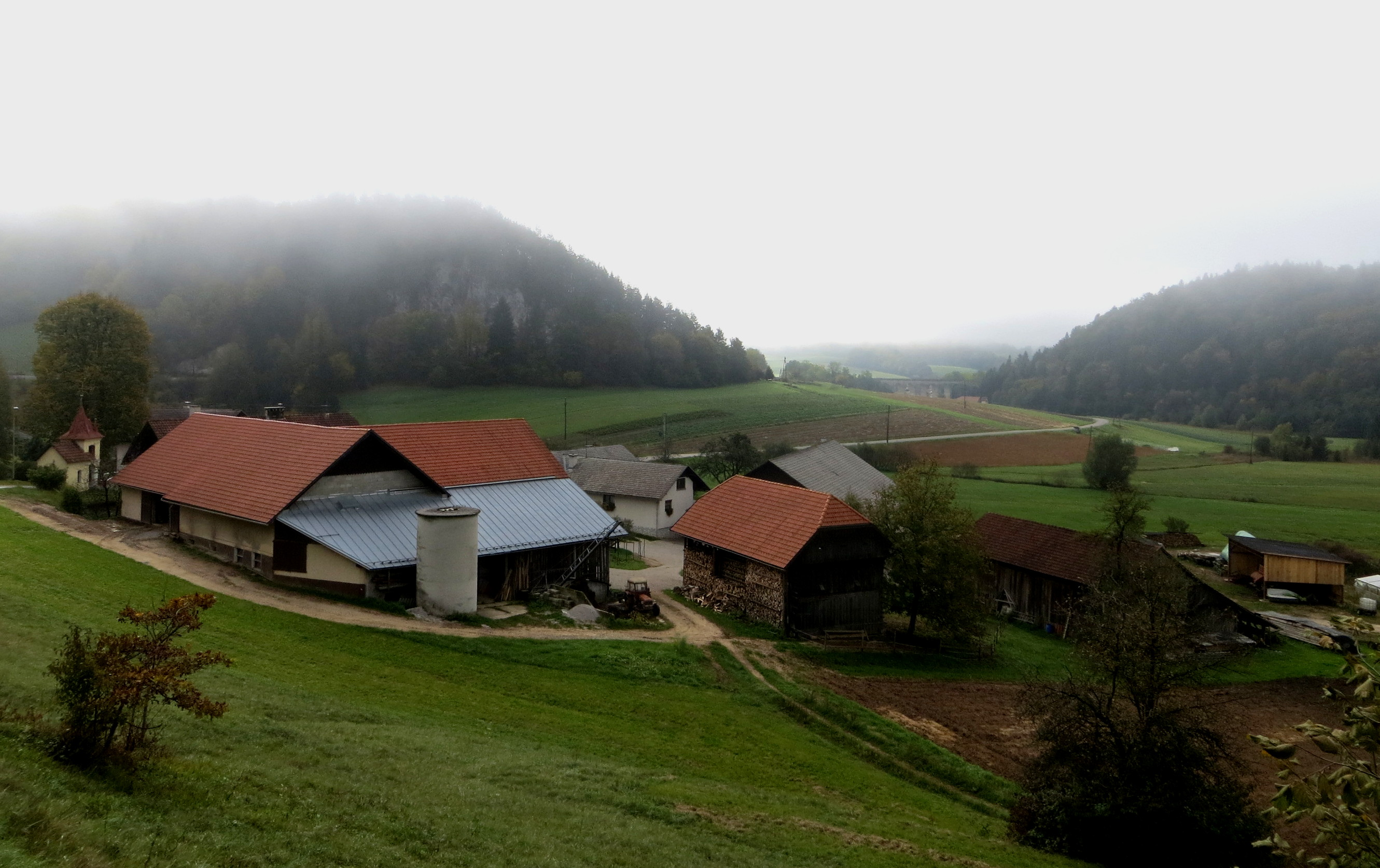

- Location in Slovenia
- Coordinates: 45°56′46.71″N 14°43′21.18″E
- Country: Slovenia
- Traditional region: Lower Carniola
- Statistical region: Central Slovenia
- Municipality: Grosuplje

Area
  - Total: 1.39 km^{2} (0.54 sq mi)
- Elevation: 341.7 m (1,121 ft)

Population (2002)
  - Total: 40

Mala Loka pri Višnji Gori (pronounced [ˈmaːla ˈloːka pɾi ˈʋiːʃnji ˈɡɔːɾi]; German: Kleinlack) is a settlement in the Municipality of Grosuplje in central Slovenia. It lies southwest of Višnja Gora in the historical region of Lower Carniola. The municipality is now included in the Central Slovenia Statistical Region.

== Name ==
The name of the settlement was changed from Mala Loka to Mala Loka pri Višnji Gori in 1953. In the past the German name was Kleinlack.

== Chapel ==
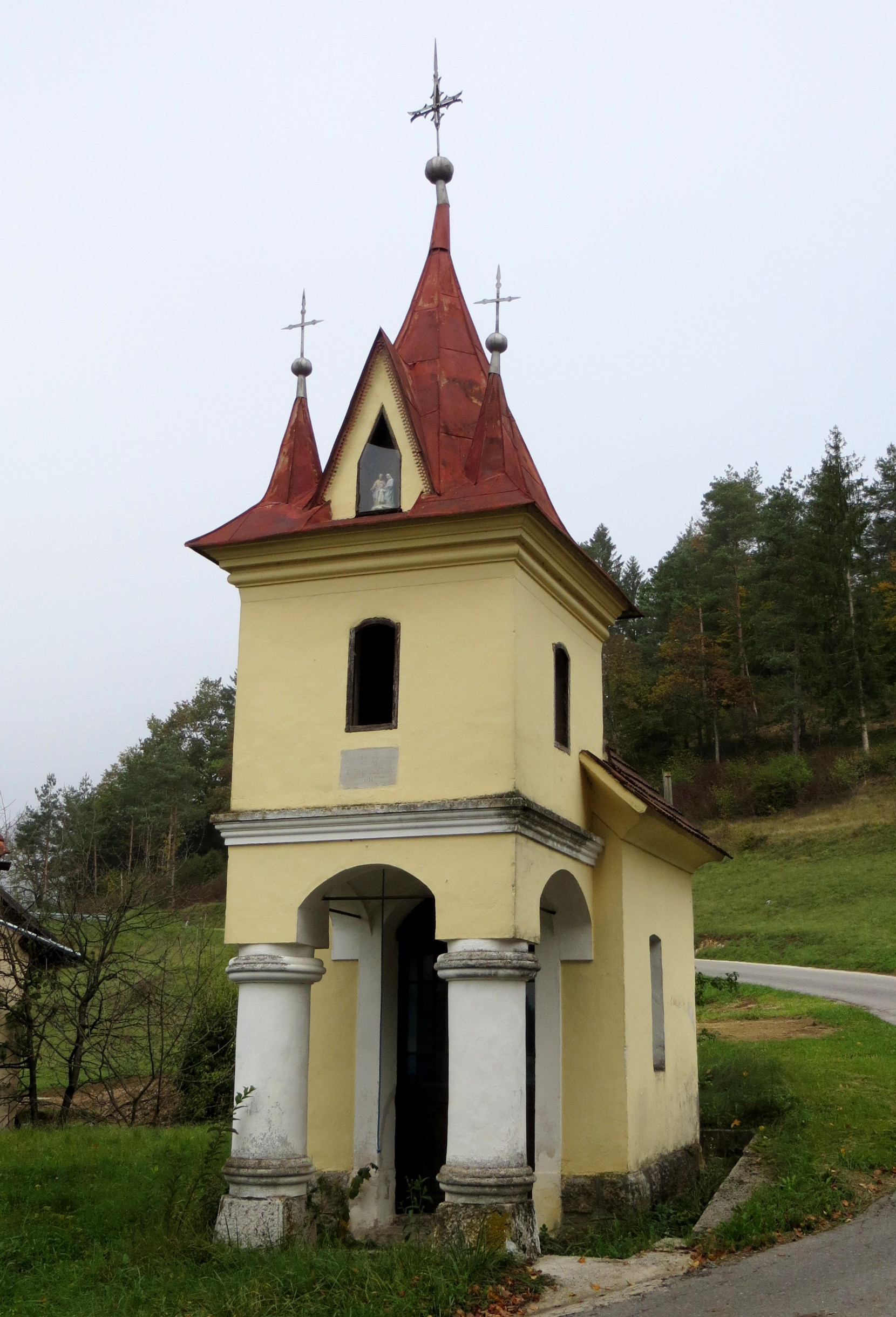
Our Lady of Sorrows Chapel

A small chapel in the northern part of the settlement is dedicated to Our Lady of Sorrows and was built in the late 19th century.
