= Gornji Rogatec =

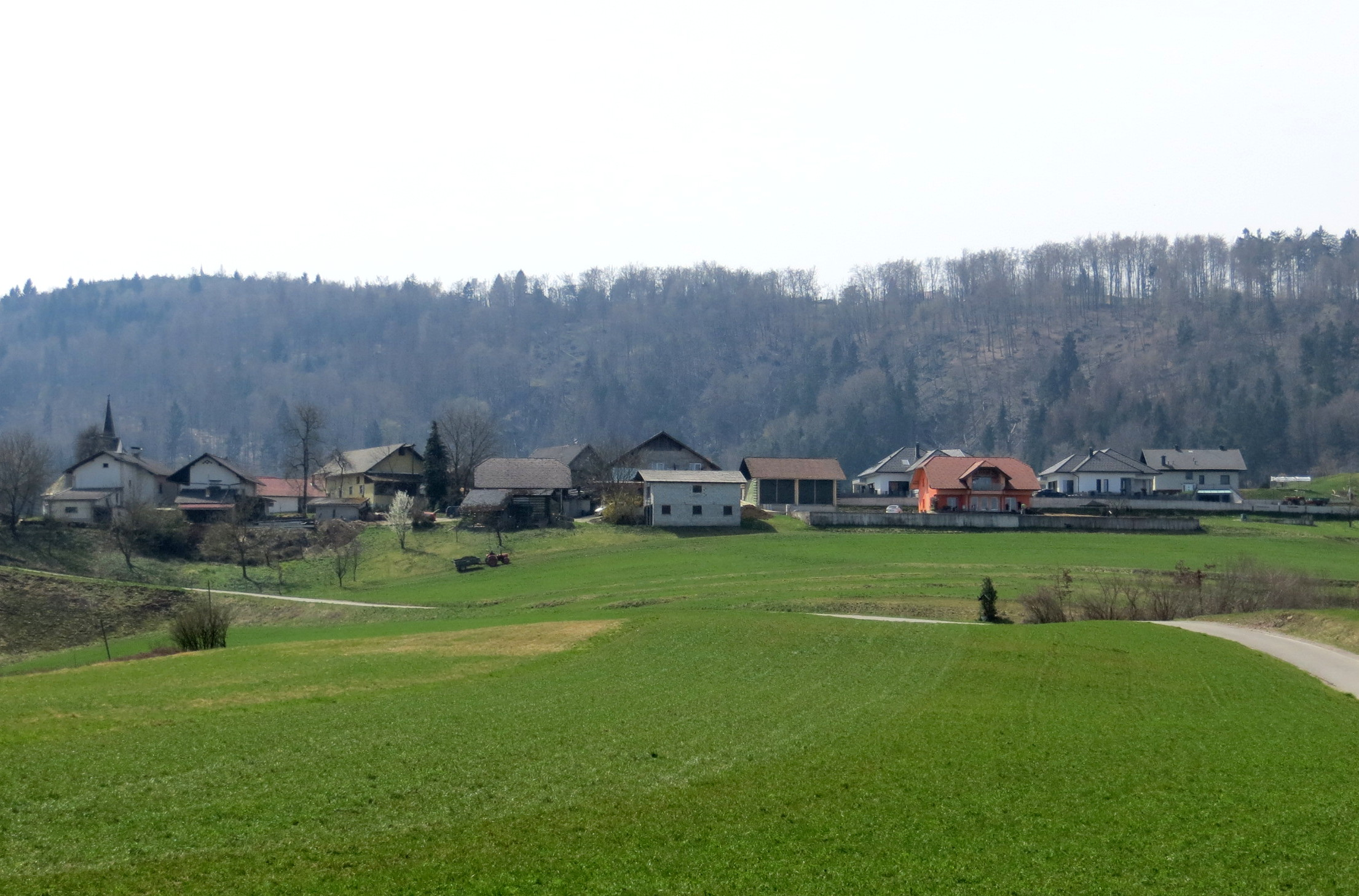

- Location in Slovenia
- Coordinates: 45°55′1.48″N 14°36′16.59″E
- Country: Slovenia
- Traditional region: Lower Carniola
- Statistical region: Central Slovenia
- Municipality: Grosuplje

Area
  - Total: 0.77 km^{2} (0.30 sq mi)
- Elevation: 407.3 m (1,336 ft)

Population (2002)
  - Total: 25

Gornji Rogatec (pronounced [ˈɡoːɾnji ɾɔˈɡaːtəts]) is a small village in the Municipality of Grosuplje in central Slovenia. The area is part of the historical region of Lower Carniola. The municipality is now included in the Central Slovenia Statistical Region.

== Name ==
The name of the settlement was changed from Rogatec to Gornji Rogatec in 1955.

== Church ==
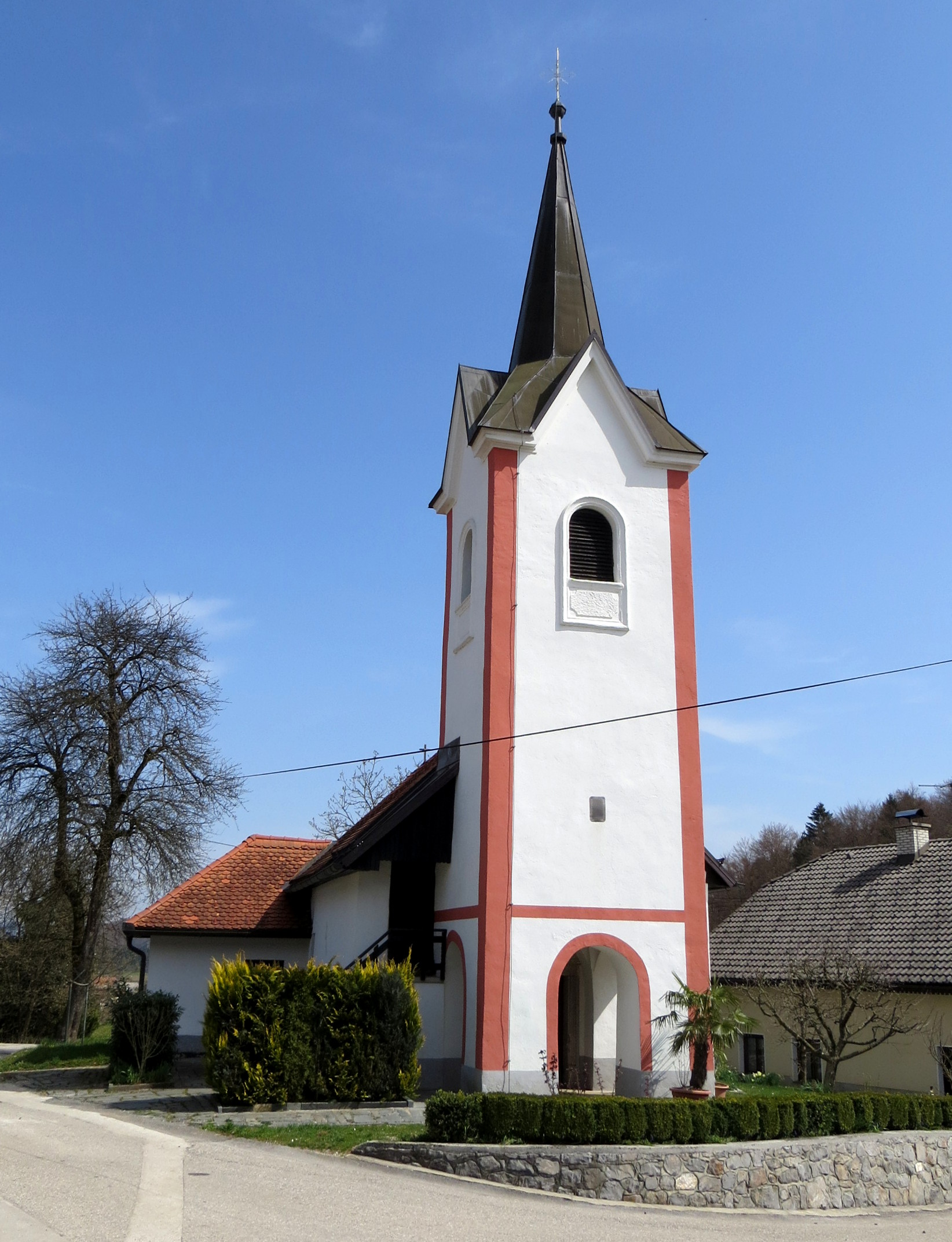
Saint Martin's Church

The local church is dedicated to Saint Martin and belongs to the Parish of Št. Jurij pri Grosupljem. It was originally a Gothic building that was restyled in the 19th century.
