= Veliki Vrh pri Šmarju =

Veliki Vrh pri Šmarju Veliki Vrh (until 1955)
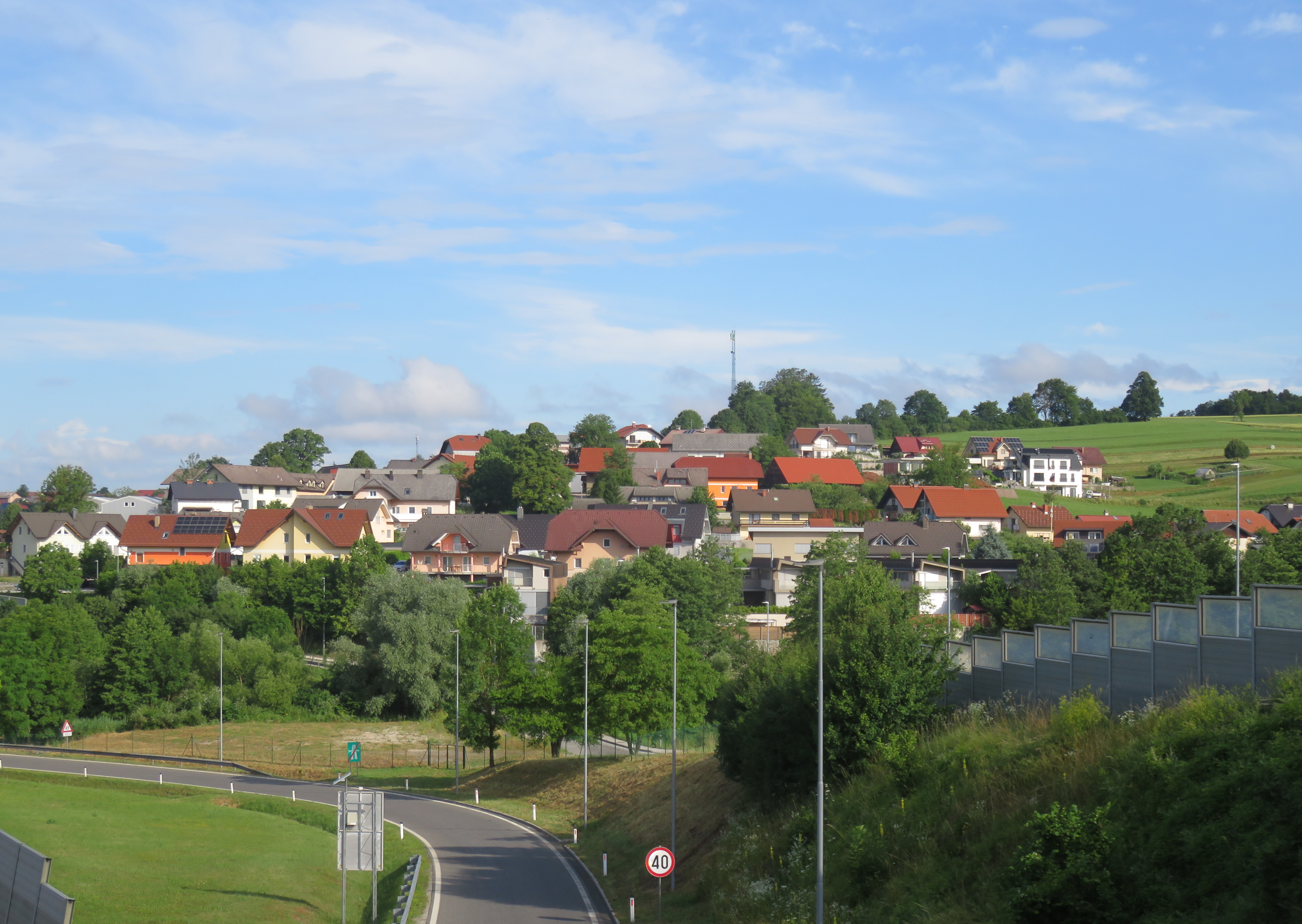

- Location in Slovenia
- Coordinates: 45°58′47.6″N 14°36′23.35″E
- Country: Slovenia
- Traditional region: Lower Carniola
- Statistical region: Central Slovenia
- Municipality: Grosuplje

Area
  - Total: 0.69 km^{2} (0.27 sq mi)
- Elevation: 364.6 m (1,196 ft)

Population (2002)
  - Total: 225

Veliki Vrh pri Šmarju (pronounced [ˈʋeːliki ˈʋəɾx pɾi ˈʃmaːɾju]; German: Großgupf) is a settlement northwest of Šmarje–Sap in the Municipality of Grosuplje in central Slovenia. The area is part of the historical region of Lower Carniola. The municipality is now included in the Central Slovenia Statistical Region.

== Name ==
The name of the settlement was changed from Veliki Vrh to Veliki Vrh pri Šmarju in 1955.
