= Male Lipljene =

- Village
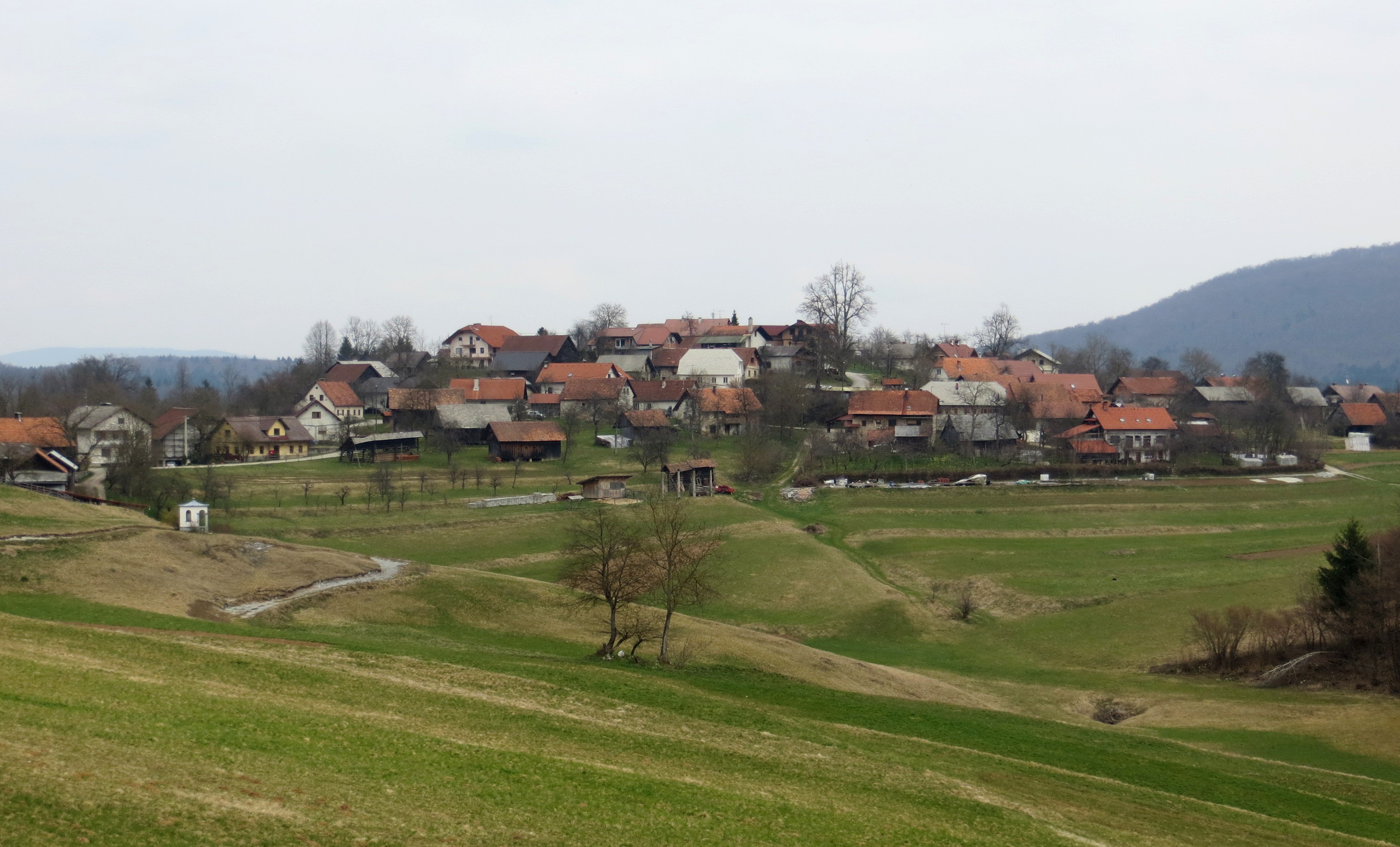

- Location in Slovenia
- Coordinates: 45°53′23.39″N 14°38′10.93″E
- Country: Slovenia
- Traditional region: Lower Carniola
- Statistical region: Central Slovenia
- Municipality: Grosuplje

Area
  - Total: 2.29 km^{2} (0.88 sq mi)
- Elevation: 503.8 m (1,653 ft)

Population (2002)
  - Total: 88

Male Lipljene (pronounced [ˈmaːle ˈliːpljɛnɛ]; German: Kleinliplein) is a settlement in the Municipality of Grosuplje in central Slovenia. The area is part of the historical region of Lower Carniola. The municipality is now included in the Central Slovenia Statistical Region.

Archaeological evidence of an Iron Age and Roman period burial ground has been uncovered near the settlement.

== Gallery ==
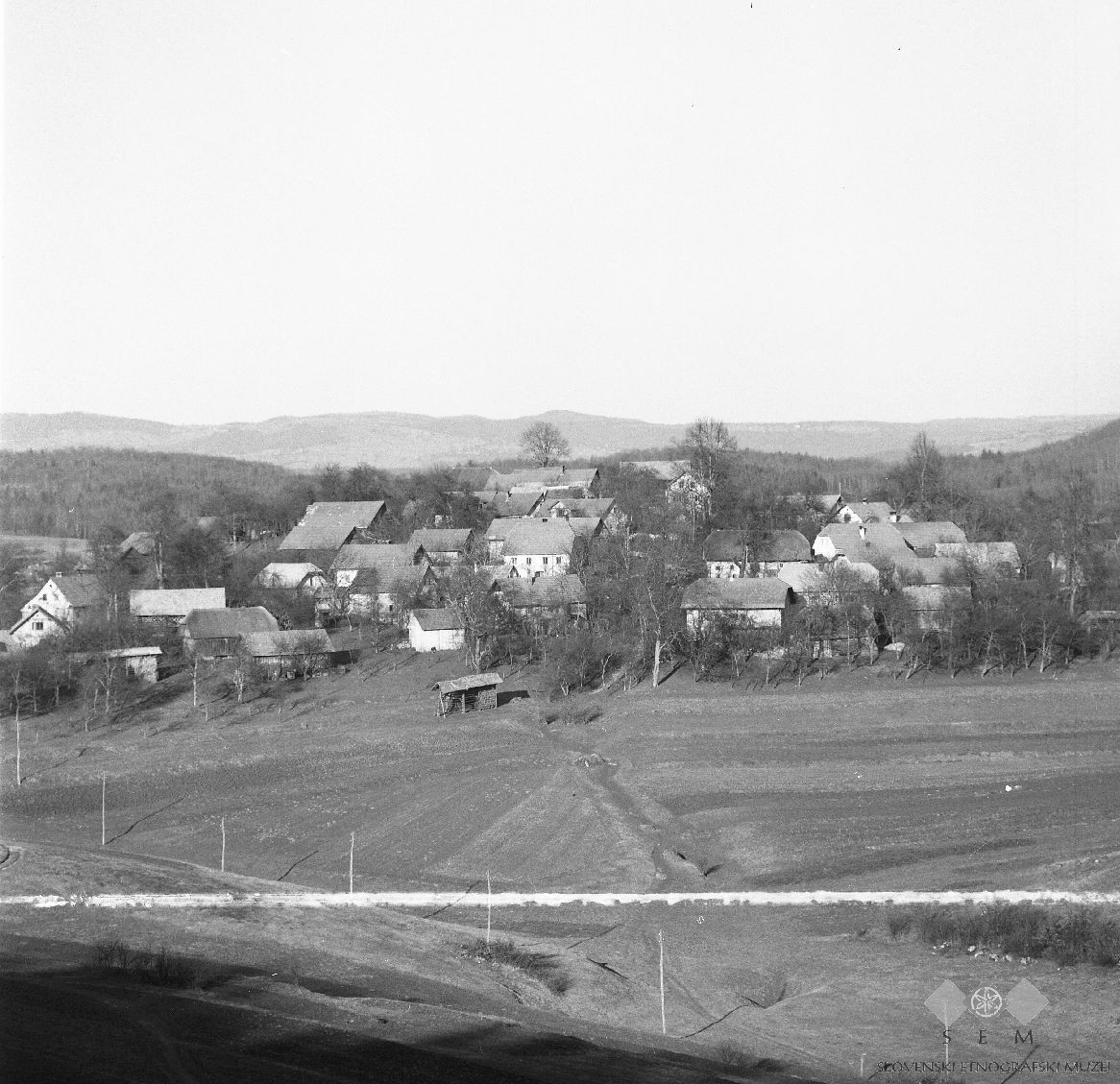
Male Lipljene in 1964
