= Plešivica pri Žalni =

Plešivica pri Žalni Plešivica (until 1953)
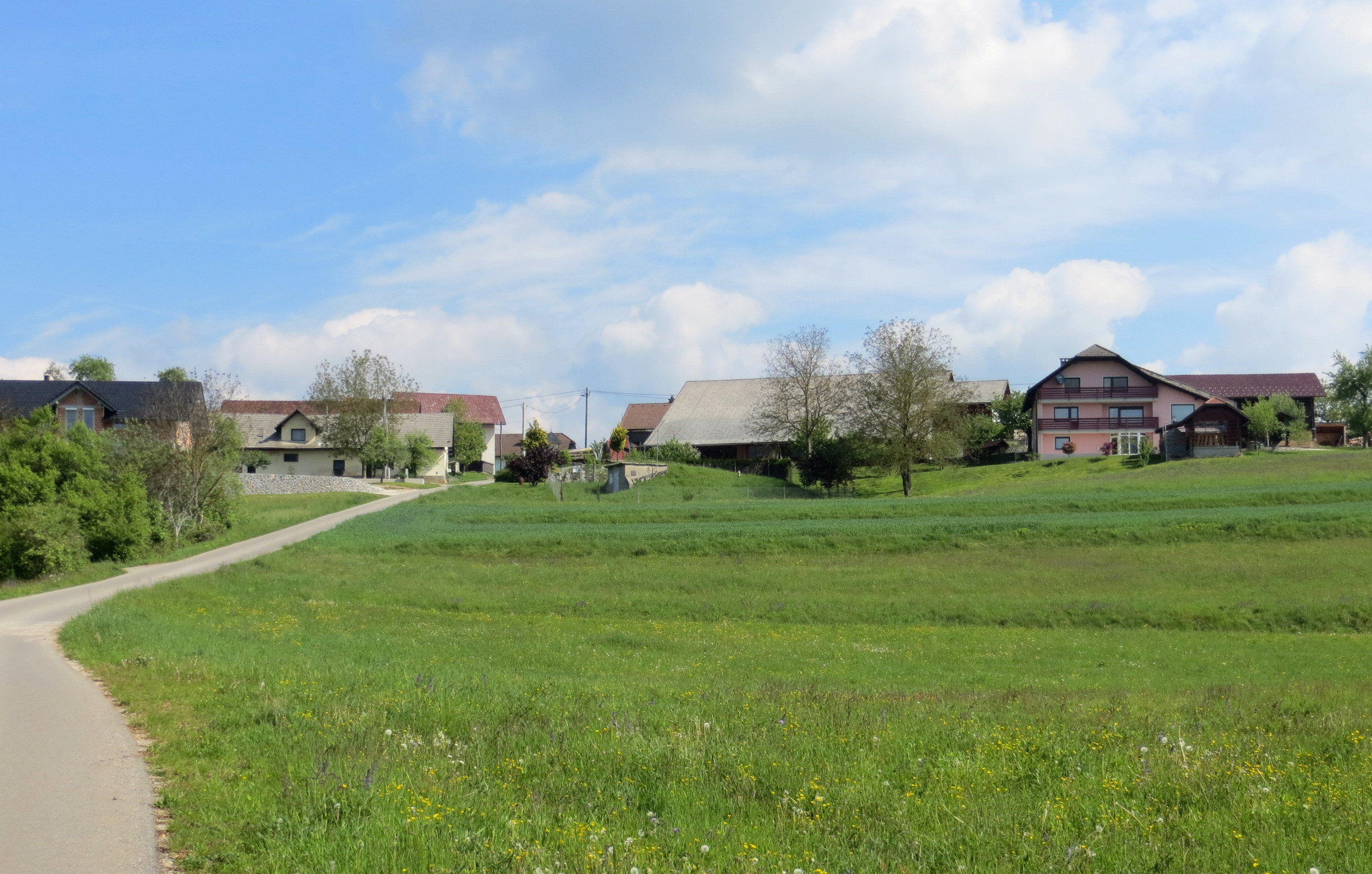

- Location in Slovenia
- Coordinates: 45°55′48.52″N 14°42′0.23″E
- Country: Slovenia
- Traditional region: Lower Carniola
- Statistical region: Central Slovenia
- Municipality: Grosuplje

Area
  - Total: 4.41 km^{2} (1.70 sq mi)
- Elevation: 422.4 m (1,386 ft)

Population (2002)
  - Total: 118

Plešivica pri Žalni (pronounced [plɛˈʃiːʋitsa pɾi ˈʒaːlni]; in older sources also Plešivice) is a settlement south of Žalna in the Municipality of Grosuplje in central Slovenia. The area is part of the historical region of Lower Carniola. The municipality is now included in the Central Slovenia Statistical Region.

== Name ==
The name of the settlement was changed from Plešivica to Plešivica pri Žalni in 1953.

== Cultural heritage ==
There is a three-storey shrine with a sculpture of Saint Lawrence in its main niche in centre of the village. It dates to the late 18th century.
