= Brvace =

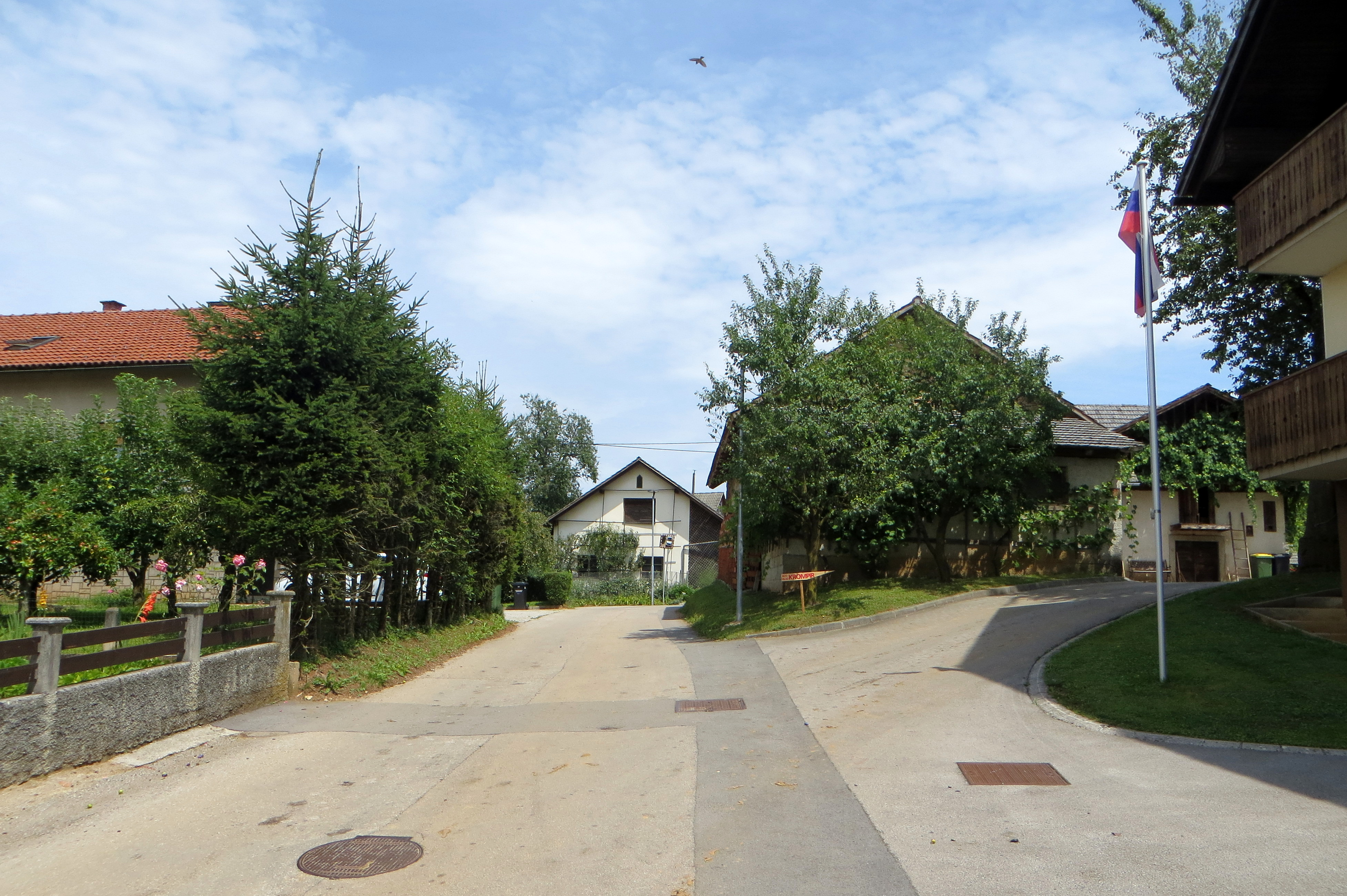

- Location in Slovenia
- Coordinates: 45°57′46.52″N 14°38′45.91″E
- Country: Slovenia
- Traditional region: Lower Carniola
- Statistical region: Central Slovenia
- Municipality: Grosuplje

Area
  - Total: 0.55 km^{2} (0.21 sq mi)
- Elevation: 346.7 m (1,137 ft)

Population (2002)
  - Total: 77

Brvace (pronounced [bəɾˈʋaːtsɛ]) is a small settlement just northwest of Grosuplje in central Slovenia. The area is part of the historical region of Lower Carniola. The municipality is now included in the Central Slovenia Statistical Region.

A small roadside chapel-shrine in the northern part of the settlement dates to the 19th century.
