= Kožljevec =

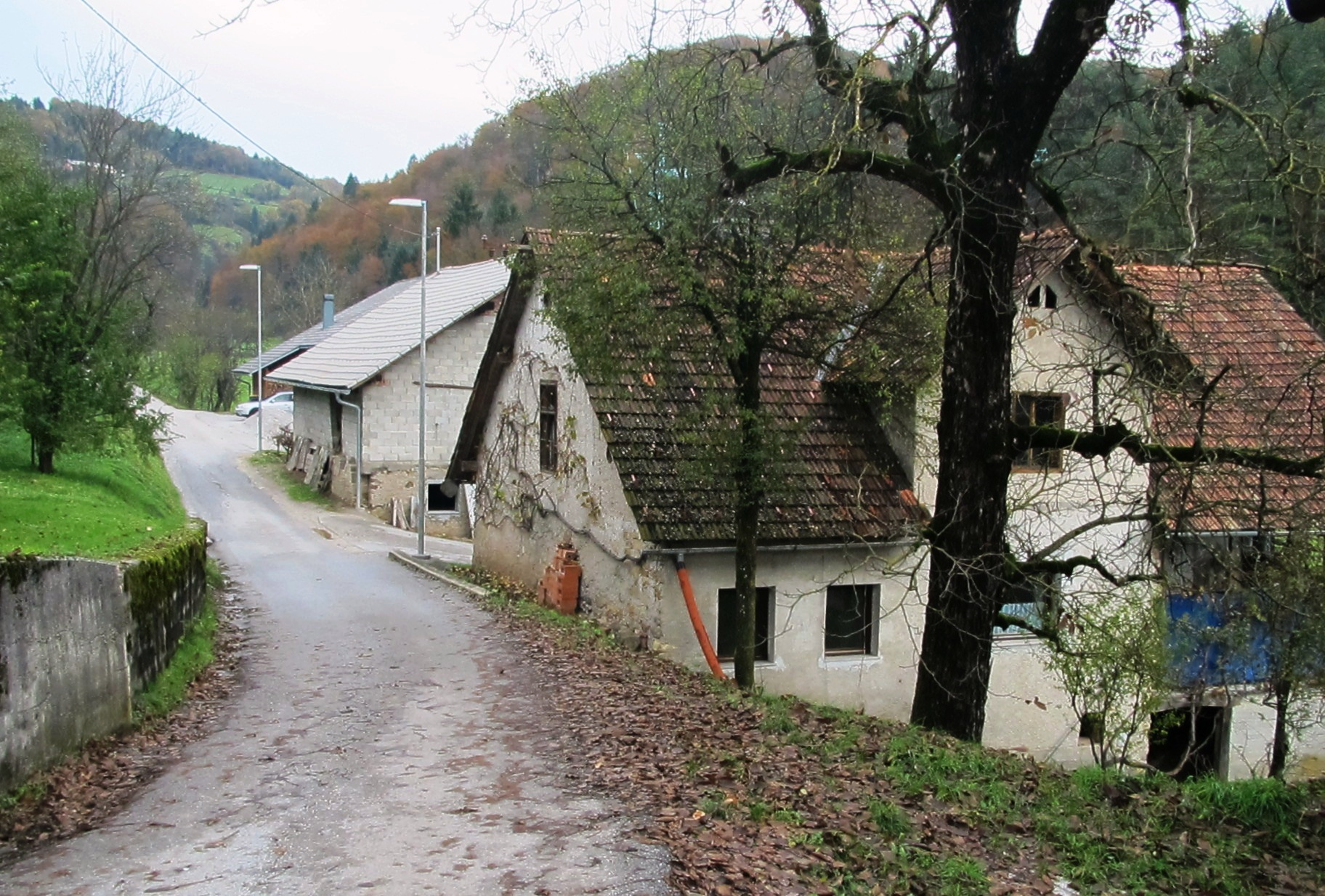
- Kožljevec

- Location in Slovenia
- Coordinates: 45°59′40.25″N 14°42′50.58″E
- Country: Slovenia
- Traditional region: Lower Carniola
- Statistical region: Central Slovenia
- Municipality: Grosuplje

Area
  - Total: 1.52 km^{2} (0.59 sq mi)
- Elevation: 429.4 m (1,409 ft)

Population (2002)
  - Total: 25

Kožljevec (pronounced [kɔˈʒleːʋəts]; in older sources also Kozljevo, German: Koslewz) is a small settlement in the hills north of Polica in the Municipality of Grosuplje in central Slovenia. The area is part of the historical region of Lower Carniola and is included in the Central Slovenia Statistical Region.

A small roadside chapel-shrine at the village crossroads is dedicated to the Virgin Mary and was built in 1910.
