= Mali Vrh pri Šmarju =

Mali Vrh pri Šmarju Mali Vrh (until 1955)
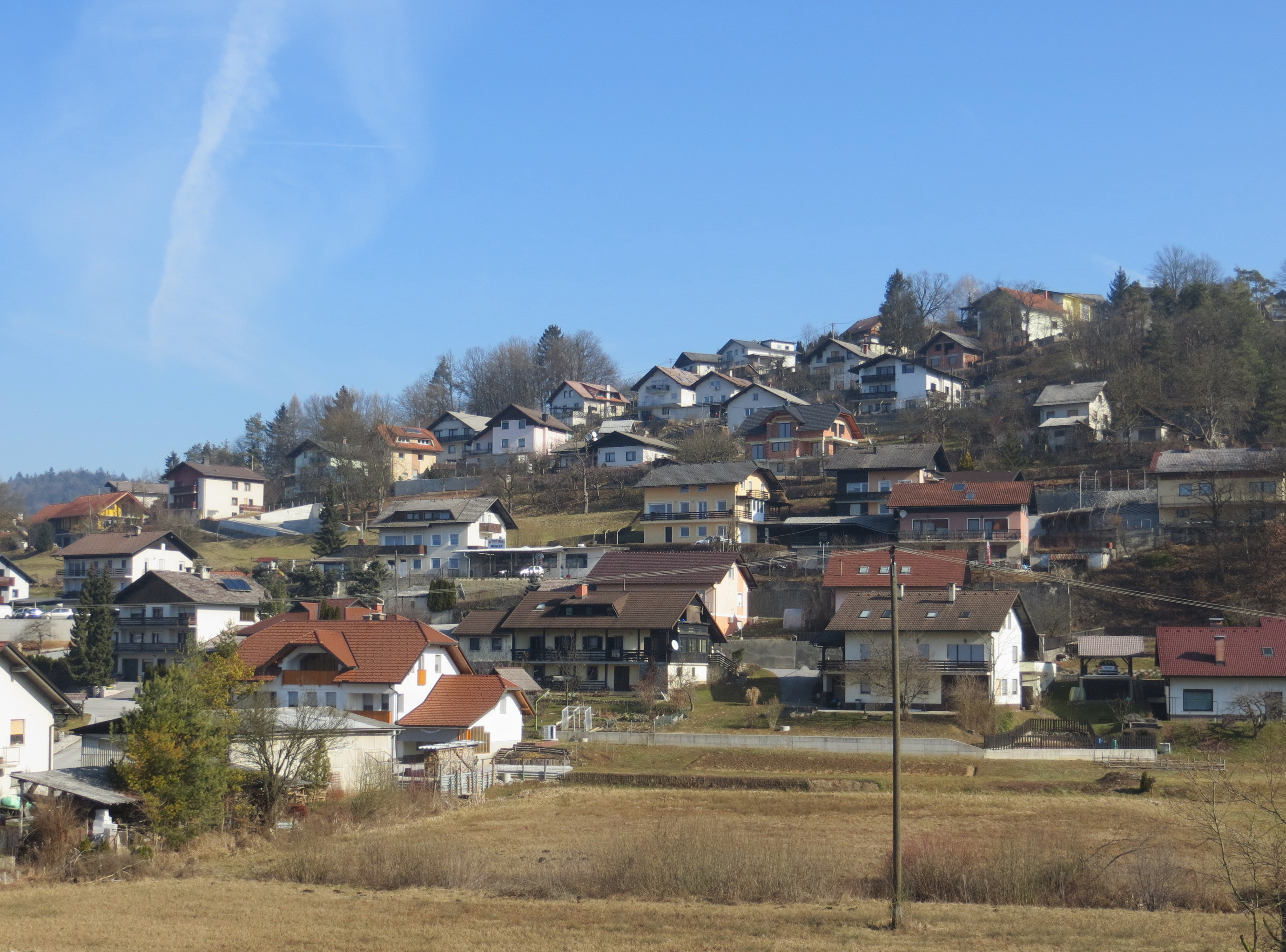

- Location in Slovenia
- Coordinates: 45°58′58.2″N 14°35′56.33″E
- Country: Slovenia
- Traditional region: Lower Carniola
- Statistical region: Central Slovenia
- Municipality: Grosuplje

Area
  - Total: 0.84 km^{2} (0.32 sq mi)
- Elevation: 376.7 m (1,236 ft)

Population (2002)
  - Total: 362

Mali Vrh pri Šmarju (pronounced [ˈmaːli ˈʋəɾx pɾi ˈʃmaːɾju]; German: Kleingupf) is a settlement just northwest of Šmarje–Sap in the Municipality of Grosuplje in central Slovenia. The area is part of the historical region of Lower Carniola. The municipality is now included in the Central Slovenia Statistical Region.

== Name ==
Mali Vrh was attested in historical sources as Wenigen perk in 1453. The name of the settlement was changed from Mali Vrh to Mali Vrh pri Šmarju in 1955.

== Cultural heritage ==
Evidence of an Iron Age hillfort has been found on Vrhovka Hill northeast of the settlement.
