= Cikava, Grosuplje =

Cikava
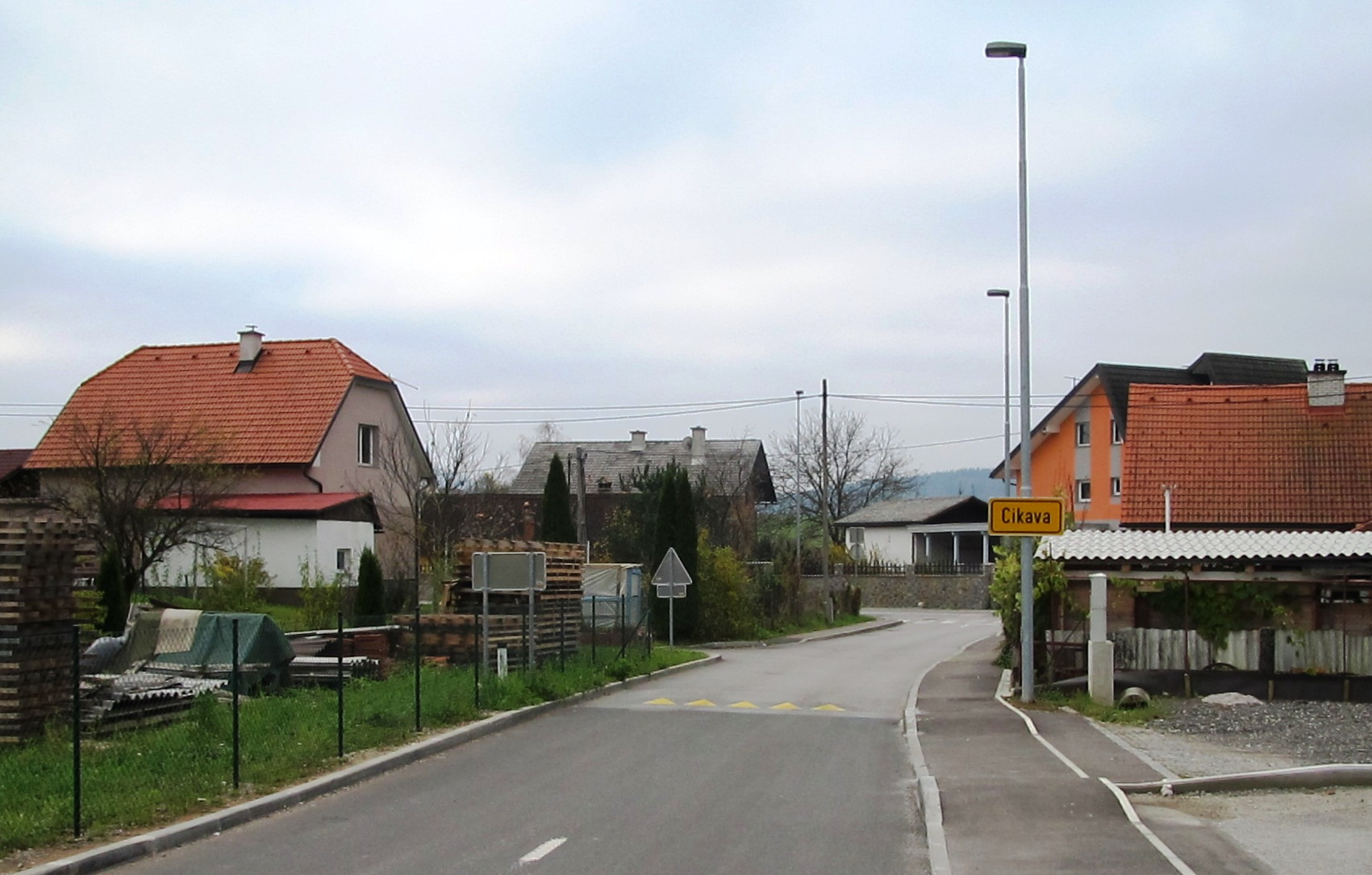

- Location in Slovenia
- Coordinates: 45°58′0.63″N 14°37′59.84″E
- Country: Slovenia
- Traditional region: Lower Carniola
- Statistical region: Central Slovenia
- Municipality: Grosuplje

Area
  - Total: 0.37 km^{2} (0.14 sq mi)
- Elevation: 338.7 m (1,111 ft)

Population (2002)
  - Total: 219

Cikava (pronounced [tsiˈkaːʋa]) is a small settlement in the Municipality of Grosuplje in central Slovenia. It lies halfway between Grosuplje and Šmarje–Sap on the old regional road leading towards Ljubljana. The area is part of the historical region of Lower Carniola. The municipality is now included in the Central Slovenia Statistical Region.
