= Zgornje Duplice =

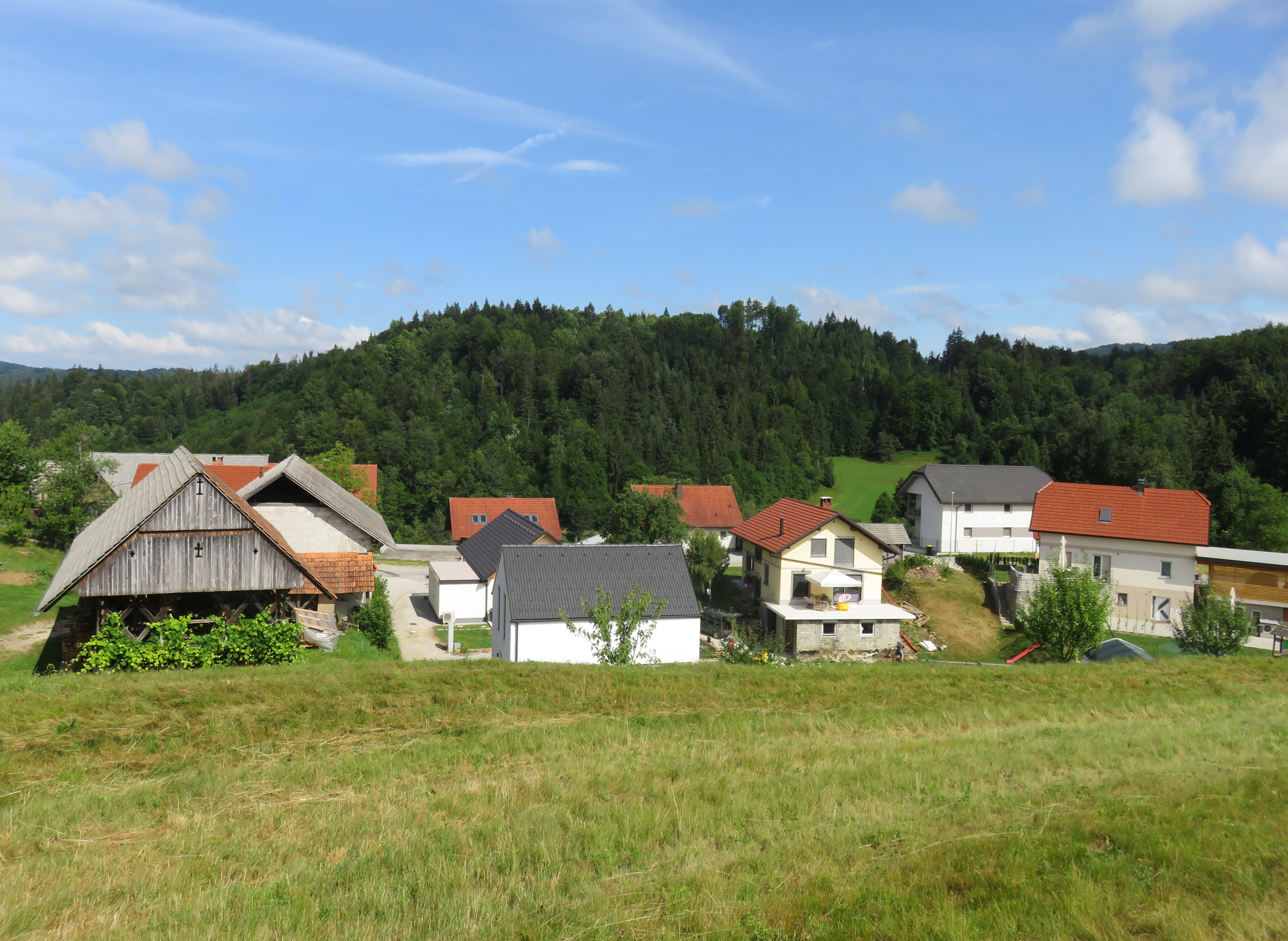

- Location in Slovenia
- Coordinates: 45°58′14.49″N 14°41′15.78″E
- Country: Slovenia
- Traditional region: Lower Carniola
- Statistical region: Central Slovenia
- Municipality: Grosuplje

Area
  - Total: 1 km^{2} (0.39 sq mi)
- Elevation: 391.1 m (1,283 ft)

Population (2002)
  - Total: 27

Zgornje Duplice (pronounced [ˈzɡoːɾnjɛ duˈpliːtsɛ]; in older sources also Gorenje Duplice, German: Oberduplitz) is a small settlement northeast of Grosuplje in central Slovenia. The area is part of the historical region of Lower Carniola. The Municipality of Grosuplje is included in the Central Slovenia Statistical Region.
