= Velika Stara Vas =

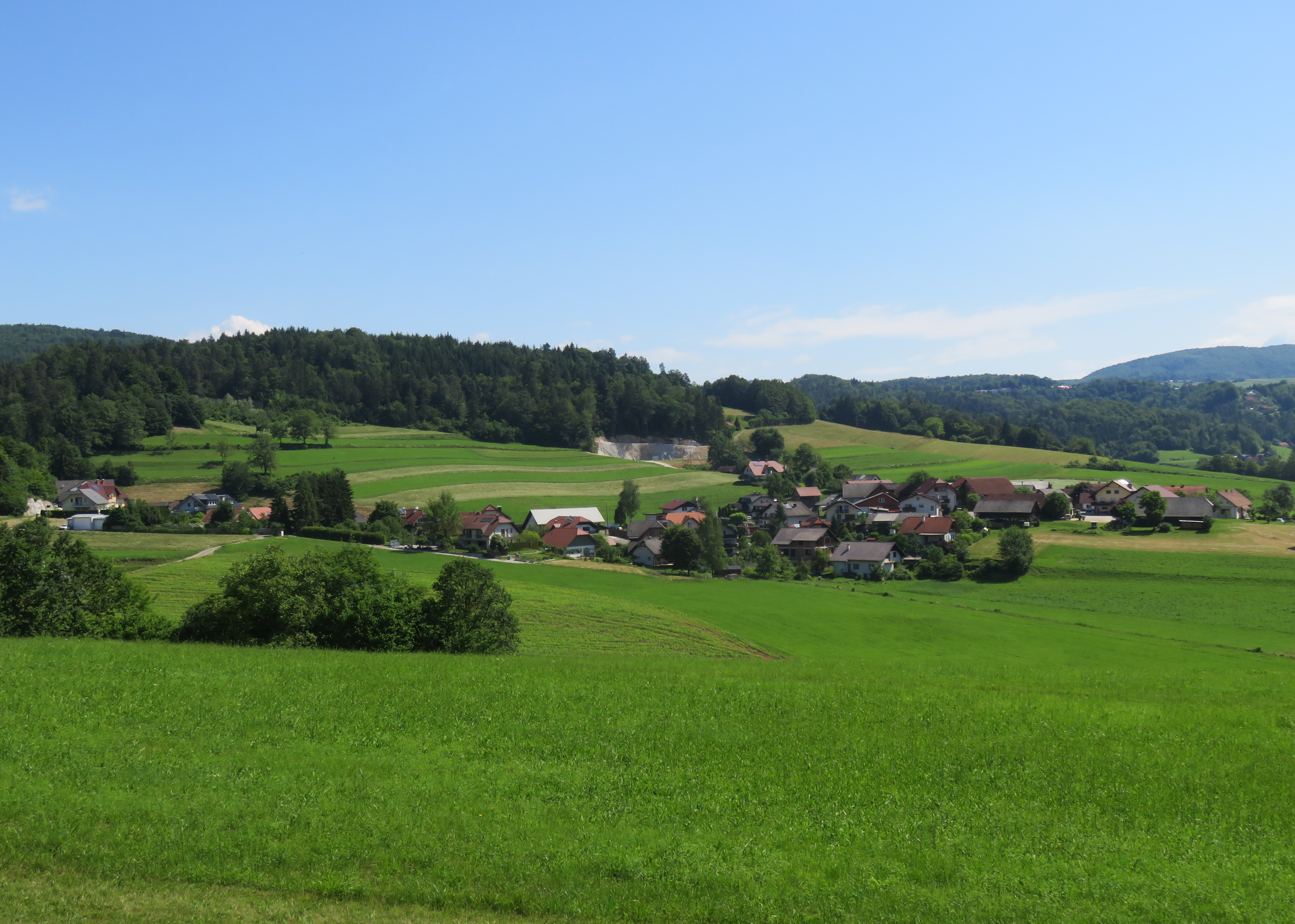

- Location in Slovenia
- Coordinates: 45°58′44.83″N 14°40′36.59″E
- Country: Slovenia
- Traditional region: Lower Carniola
- Statistical region: Central Slovenia
- Municipality: Grosuplje

Area
  - Total: 2.33 km^{2} (0.90 sq mi)
- Elevation: 370.4 m (1,215 ft)

Population (2002)
  - Total: 109

Velika Stara Vas (pronounced [ˈʋeːlika ˈstaːɾa ˈʋaːs]; Slovene: Velika Stara vas, German: Großaltendorf) is a village in the Municipality of Grosuplje in central Slovenia. It lies northeast of Grosuplje in the historical region of Lower Carniola. The municipality is now included in the Central Slovenia Statistical Region.
