= Medvedica =

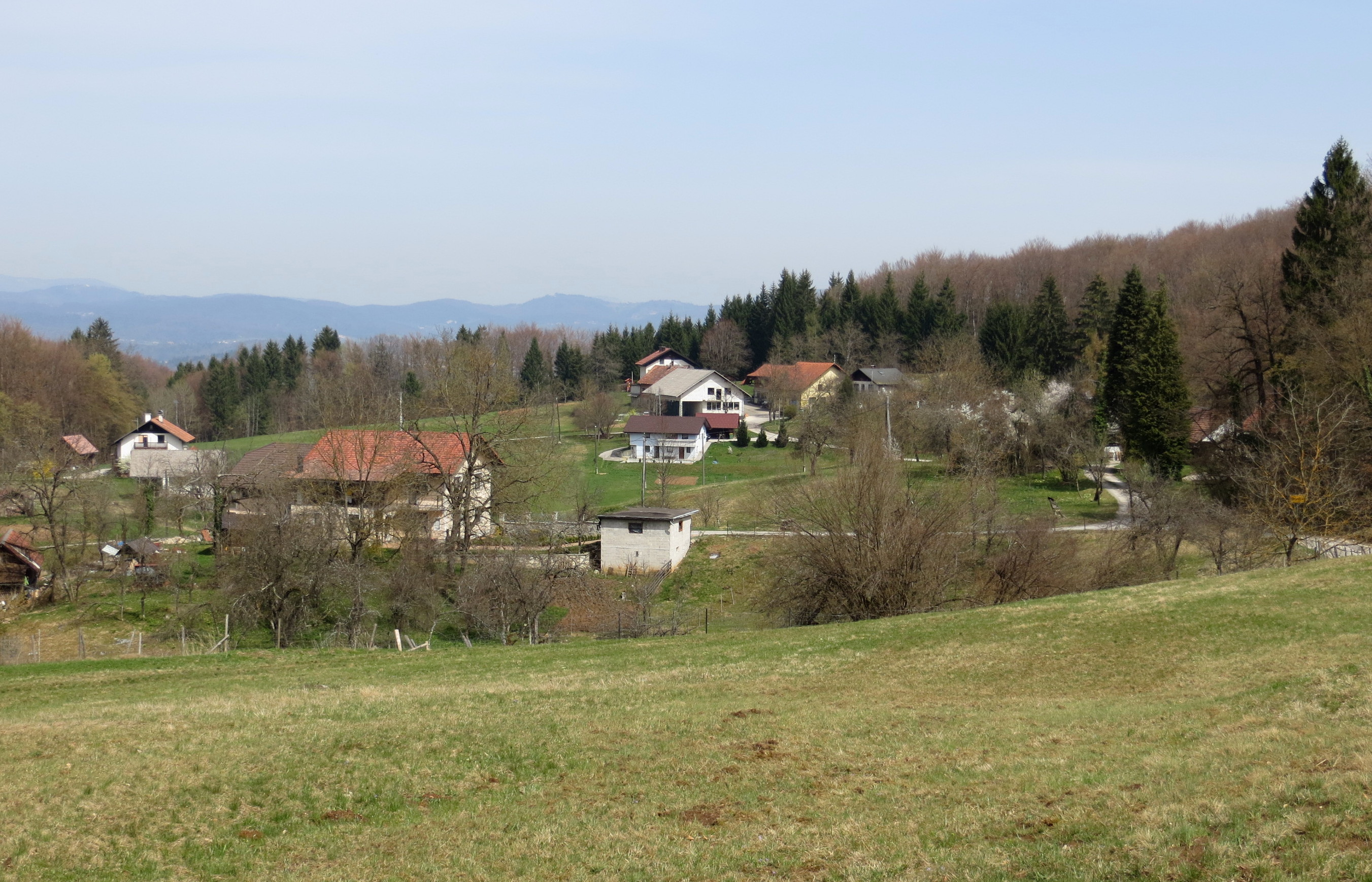

- Location in Slovenia
- Coordinates: 45°54′26.38″N 14°37′18.09″E
- Country: Slovenia
- Traditional region: Lower Carniola
- Statistical region: Central Slovenia
- Municipality: Grosuplje

Area
  - Total: 3.66 km^{2} (1.41 sq mi)
- Elevation: 411.6 m (1,350 ft)

Population (2002)
  - Total: 47

Medvedica (pronounced [mɛˈdʋeːditsa]) is a dispersed settlement in the hills south of Šent Jurij in the Municipality of Grosuplje in central Slovenia. The area is part of the historical region of Lower Carniola. The municipality is now included in the Central Slovenia Statistical Region.

== Gallery ==
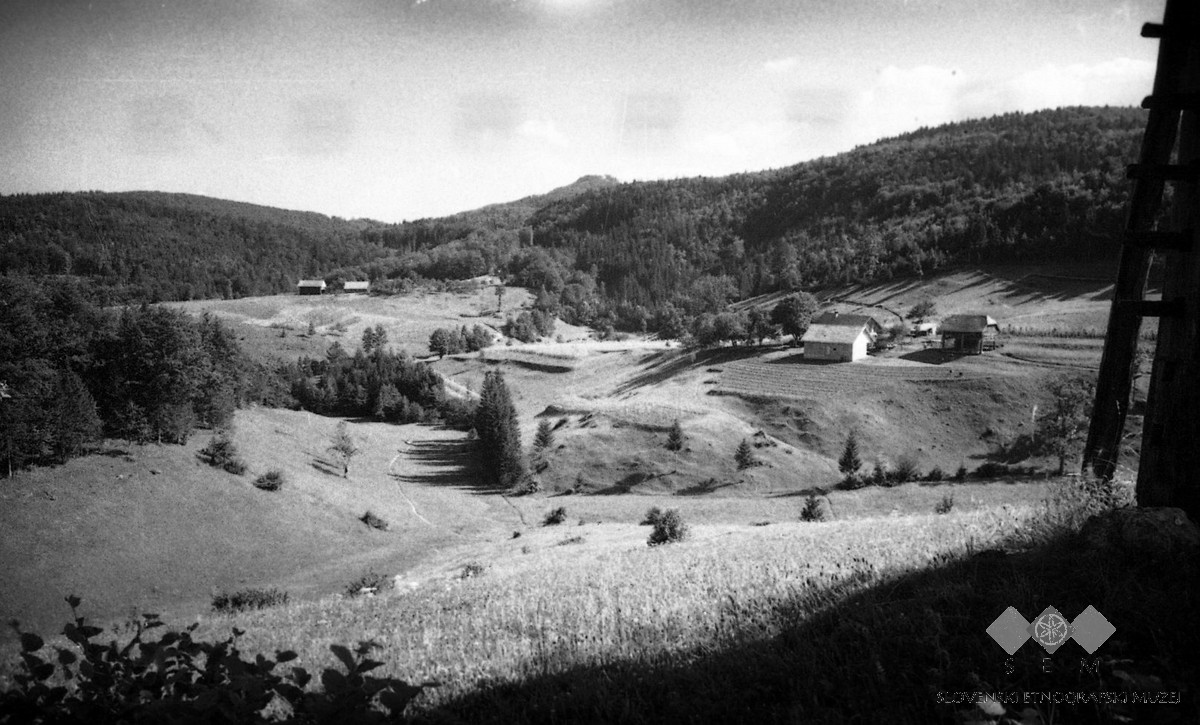
Medvedica in 1948
