= Blečji Vrh =

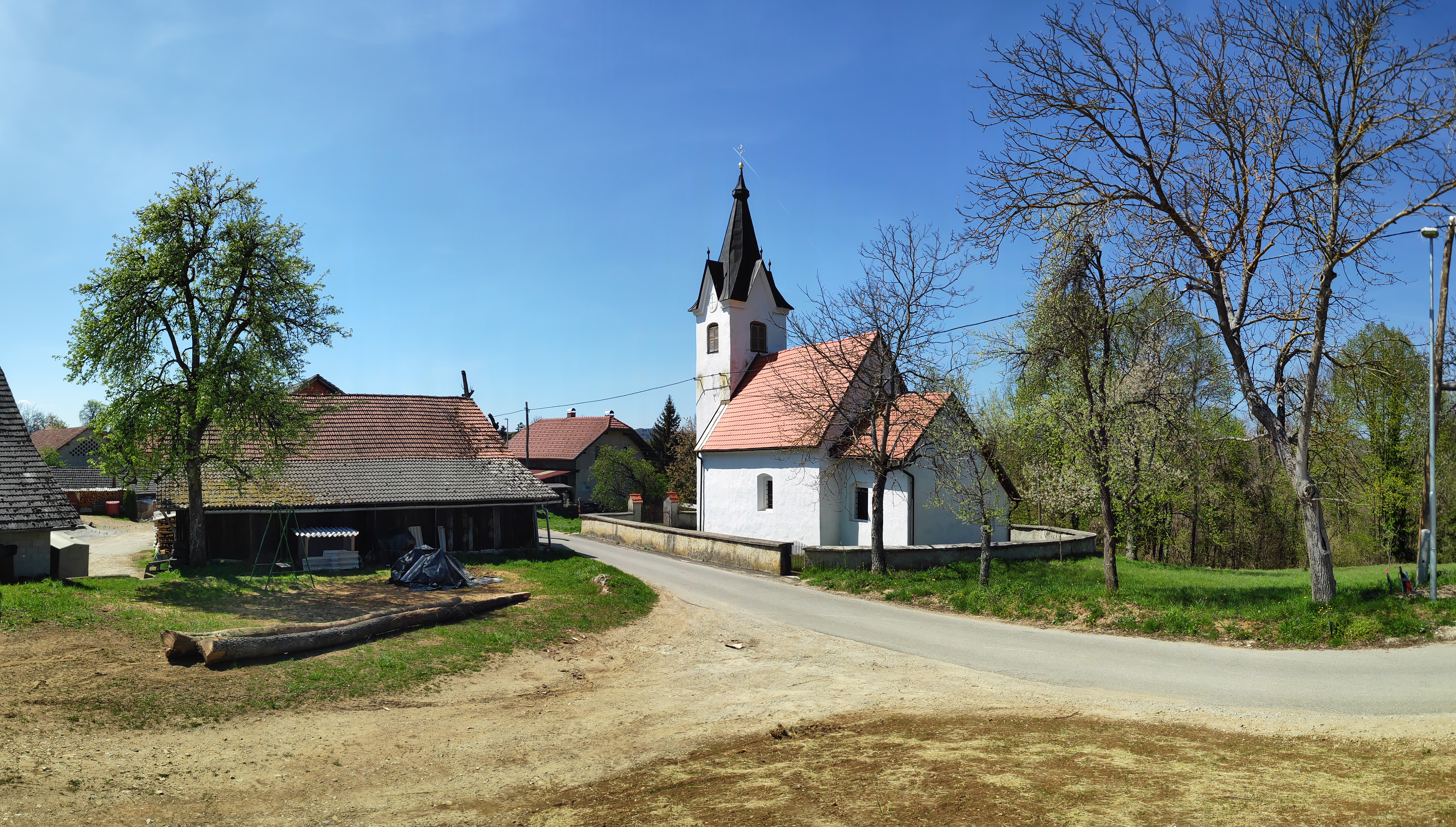

- Location in Slovenia
- Coordinates: 45°59′15.05″N 14°43′16.26″E
- Country: Slovenia
- Traditional region: Lower Carniola
- Statistical region: Central Slovenia
- Municipality: Grosuplje

Area
  - Total: 2.54 km^{2} (0.98 sq mi)
- Elevation: 547.5 m (1,796 ft)

Population (2002)
  - Total: 50

Blečji Vrh (pronounced [ˈbleːtʃji ˈʋəɾx]; in older sources also Bleč Vrh, German: Feldsberg) is a settlement in the Municipality of Grosuplje in central Slovenia. The area is part of the historical region of Lower Carniola. The municipality is now included in the Central Slovenia Statistical Region.

== Name ==
Blečji Vrh was attested in written sources as Welze in 1145 and Weltsperg in 1505.

== Church ==
The local church is dedicated to Saint Benedict and belongs to the Parish of Polica. It is a 13th-century Romanesque building that was expanded in the 18th and 19th centuries.
