= Bičje =

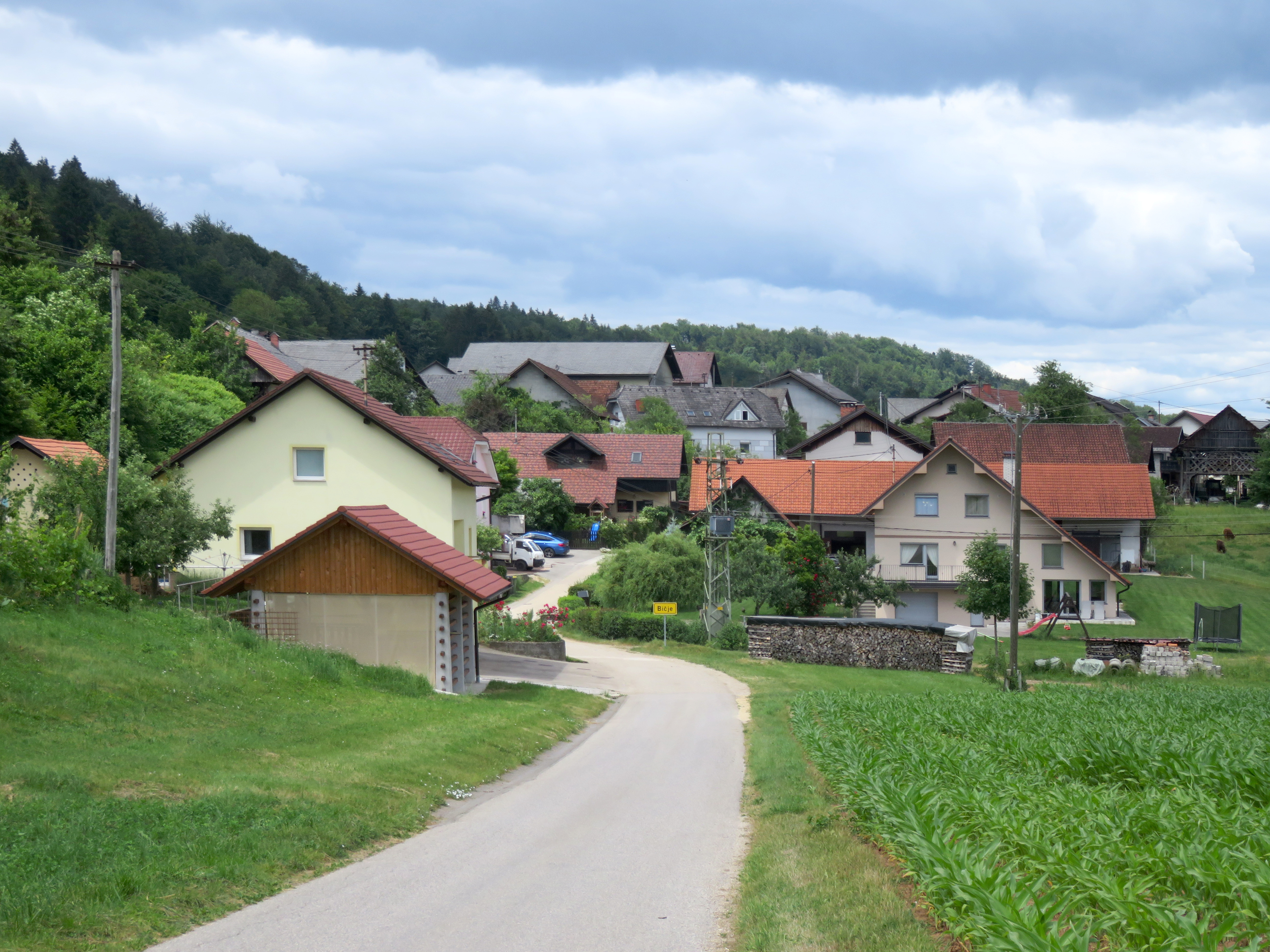

- Location in Slovenia
- Coordinates: 45°56′27.11″N 14°36′49.41″E
- Country: Slovenia
- Traditional region: Lower Carniola
- Statistical region: Central Slovenia
- Municipality: Grosuplje

Area
  - Total: 2.18 km^{2} (0.84 sq mi)
- Elevation: 347.6 m (1,140 ft)

Population (2002)
  - Total: 74

Bičje (pronounced [ˈbiːtʃjɛ]; German: Witschje) is a small settlement west of the town of Grosuplje in central Slovenia. The area is part of the historical region of Lower Carniola. The Municipality of Grosuplje is now included in the Central Slovenia Statistical Region.

== Name ==
Bičje was attested in written records as Bizi in 1058, Niderm Veiczs in 1329, Obêrfeytsch in 1383, Veitsch in 1397, and Izich in 1444, among other spellings.
