= Brezje pri Grosupljem =

Brezje pri Grosupljem Brezje (until 1953)
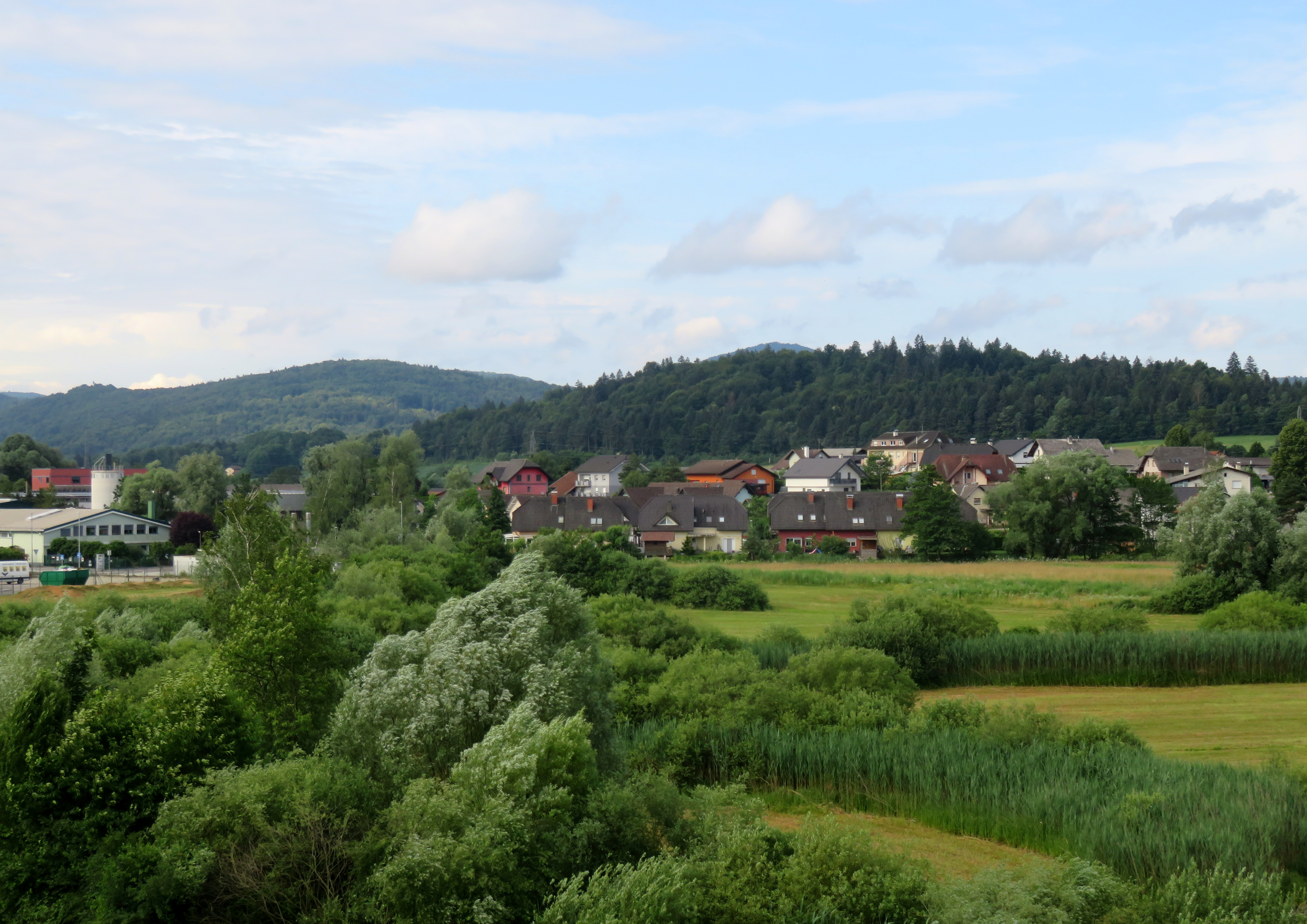

- Location in Slovenia
- Coordinates: 45°57′19.6″N 14°38′33.55″E
- Country: Slovenia
- Traditional region: Lower Carniola
- Statistical region: Central Slovenia
- Municipality: Grosuplje

Area
  - Total: 2.45 km^{2} (0.95 sq mi)
- Elevation: 335.9 m (1,102 ft)

Population (2002)
  - Total: 131

Brezje pri Grosupljem (pronounced [ˈbɾeːzjɛ pɾi ɡɾɔˈsuːpljɛm]) is a settlement just west of Grosuplje in central Slovenia. The area is part of the historical region of Lower Carniola. The Municipality of Grosuplje is now included in the Central Slovenia Statistical Region.

== Name ==
The name of the settlement was changed from Brezje to Brezje pri Grosupljem in 1953.
