= Mala Ilova Gora =

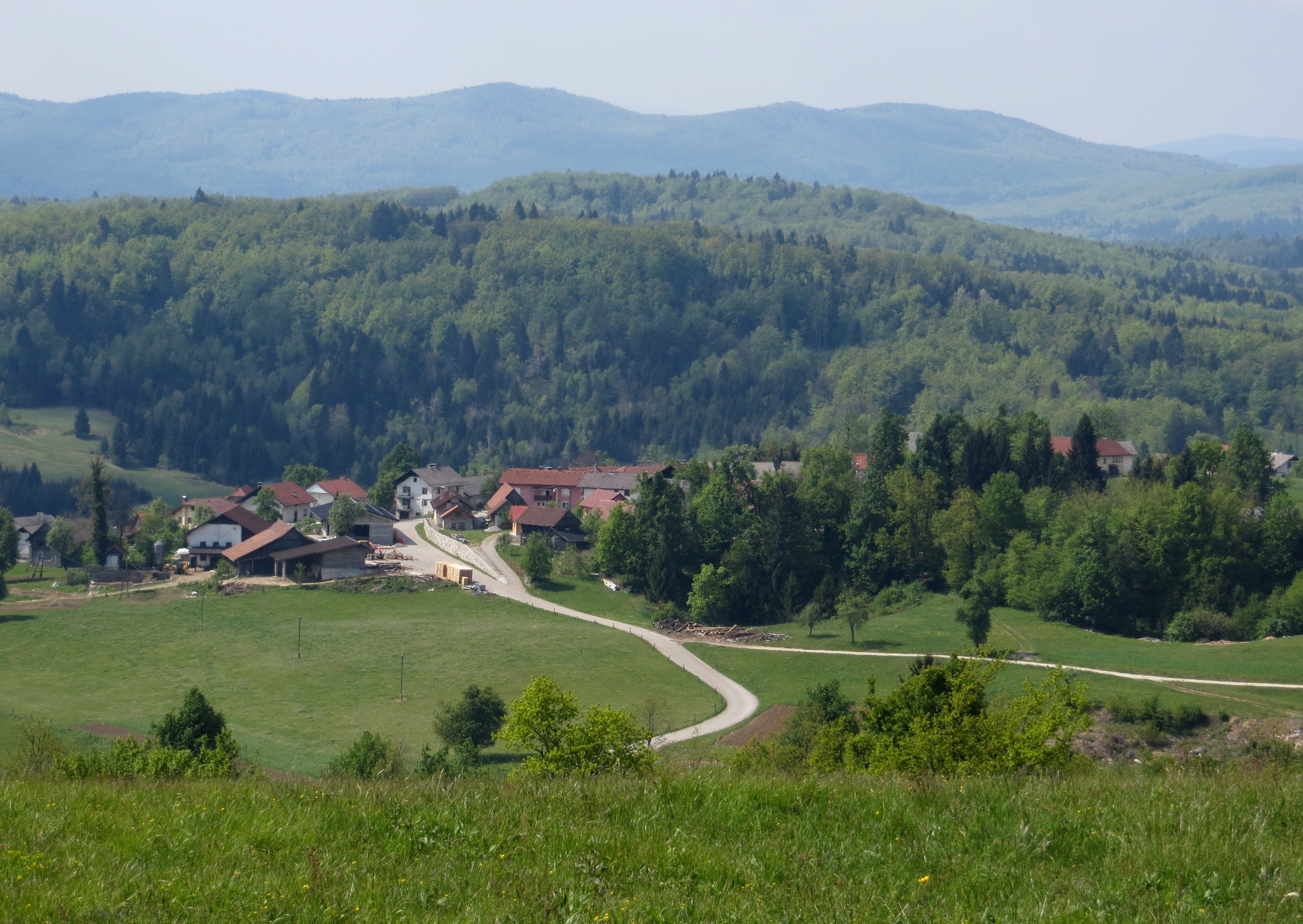

- Location in Slovenia
- Coordinates: 45°52′57.43″N 14°43′46.9″E
- Country: Slovenia
- Traditional region: Lower Carniola
- Statistical region: Central Slovenia
- Municipality: Grosuplje

Area
  - Total: 3.27 km^{2} (1.26 sq mi)
- Elevation: 477.9 m (1,568 ft)

Population (2002)
  - Total: 68

Mala Ilova Gora (pronounced [ˈmaːla ˈiːlɔʋa ˈɡɔːɾa]) is a village in the Municipality of Grosuplje in central Slovenia. The area is part of the historical region of Lower Carniola. The municipality is now included in the Central Slovenia Statistical Region.

The local church is dedicated to the Holy Cross and belongs to the Parish of Dobrepolje–Videm. It was built in the 1990s.
