= Municipality of Grosuplje =

Municipality of Slovenia

Municipality of Grosuplje Občina Grosuplje
- Municipality
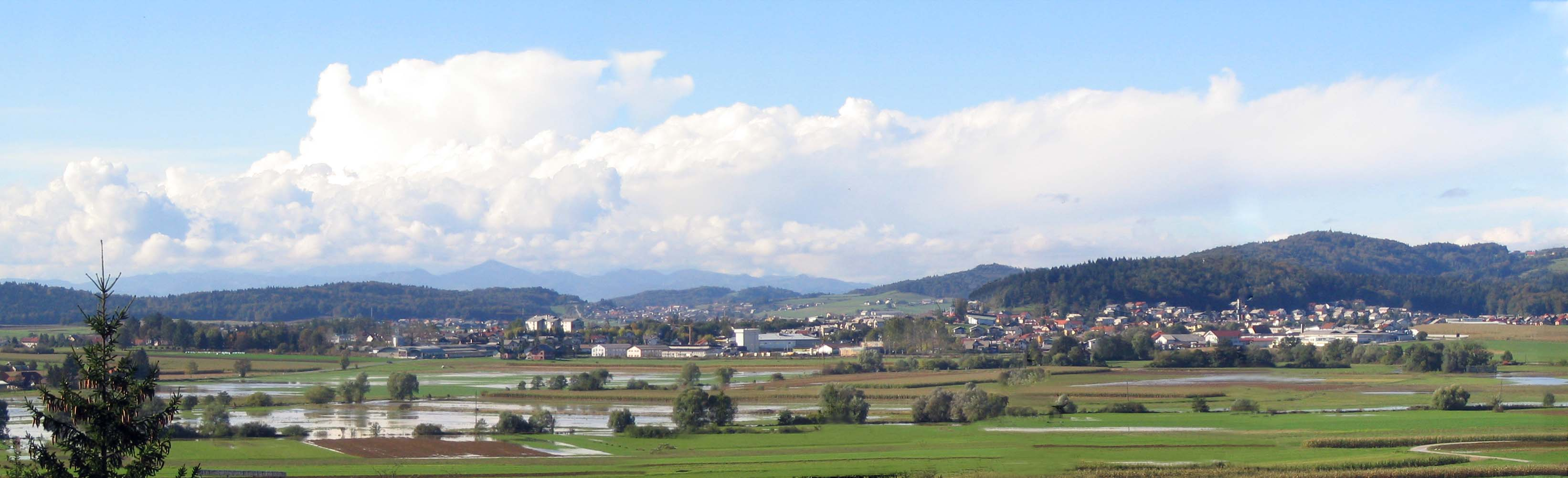

- Location of the Municipality of Grosuplje in Slovenia
- Coordinates: 45°57′18.45″N 14°40′22.32″E
- Country: Slovenia

Government
  - Mayor: Peter Verlič (SDS)

Area
  - Total: 133.8 km^{2} (51.7 sq mi)

Population (2010)
  - Total: 19,136
  - Density: 143.0/km^{2} (370.4/sq mi)
- Time zone: UTC+01 (CET)
  - Summer (DST): UTC+02 (CEST)
- Website: www.grosuplje.si

The Municipality of Grosuplje (pronounced [ɡɾɔˈsùːpljɛ]; Slovene: Občina Grosuplje) is a municipality in central Slovenia. The seat of the municipality is the town of Grosuplje. It lies just south of the capital Ljubljana in the traditional region of Lower Carniola. It is now included in the Central Slovenia Statistical Region.

== Settlements ==
In addition to the municipal seat of Grosuplje, the municipality also includes the following settlements:

- Bičje
- Blečji Vrh
- Brezje pri Grosupljem
- Brvace
- Cerovo
- Cikava
- Čušperk
- Dobje
- Dole pri Polici
- Dolenja Vas pri Polici
- Gabrje pri Ilovi Gori
- Gajniče
- Gatina
- Gorenja Vas pri Polici
- Gornji Rogatec
- Gradišče
- Hrastje pri Grosupljem
- Huda Polica
- Kožljevec
- Lobček
- Luče
- Mala Ilova Gora
- Mala Loka pri Višnji Gori
- Mala Račna
- Mala Stara Vas
- Mala Vas pri Grosupljem
- Male Lipljene
- Mali Konec
- Mali Vrh pri Šmarju
- Malo Mlačevo
- Medvedica
- Paradišče
- Pece
- Peč
- Plešivica pri Žalni
- Podgorica pri Podtaboru
- Podgorica pri Šmarju
- Polica
- Ponova Vas
- Praproče pri Grosupljem
- Predole
- Rožnik
- Sela pri Šmarju
- Šent Jurij
- Škocjan
- Šmarje–Sap
- Spodnja Slivnica
- Spodnje Blato
- Spodnje Duplice
- Tlake
- Troščine
- Udje
- Velika Ilova Gora
- Velika Loka
- Velika Račna
- Velika Stara Vas
- Velike Lipljene
- Veliki Vrh pri Šmarju
- Veliko Mlačevo
- Vino
- Vrbičje
- Zagradec pri Grosupljem
- Žalna
- Železnica
- Zgornja Slivnica
- Zgornje Duplice
