= Spodnje Duplice =

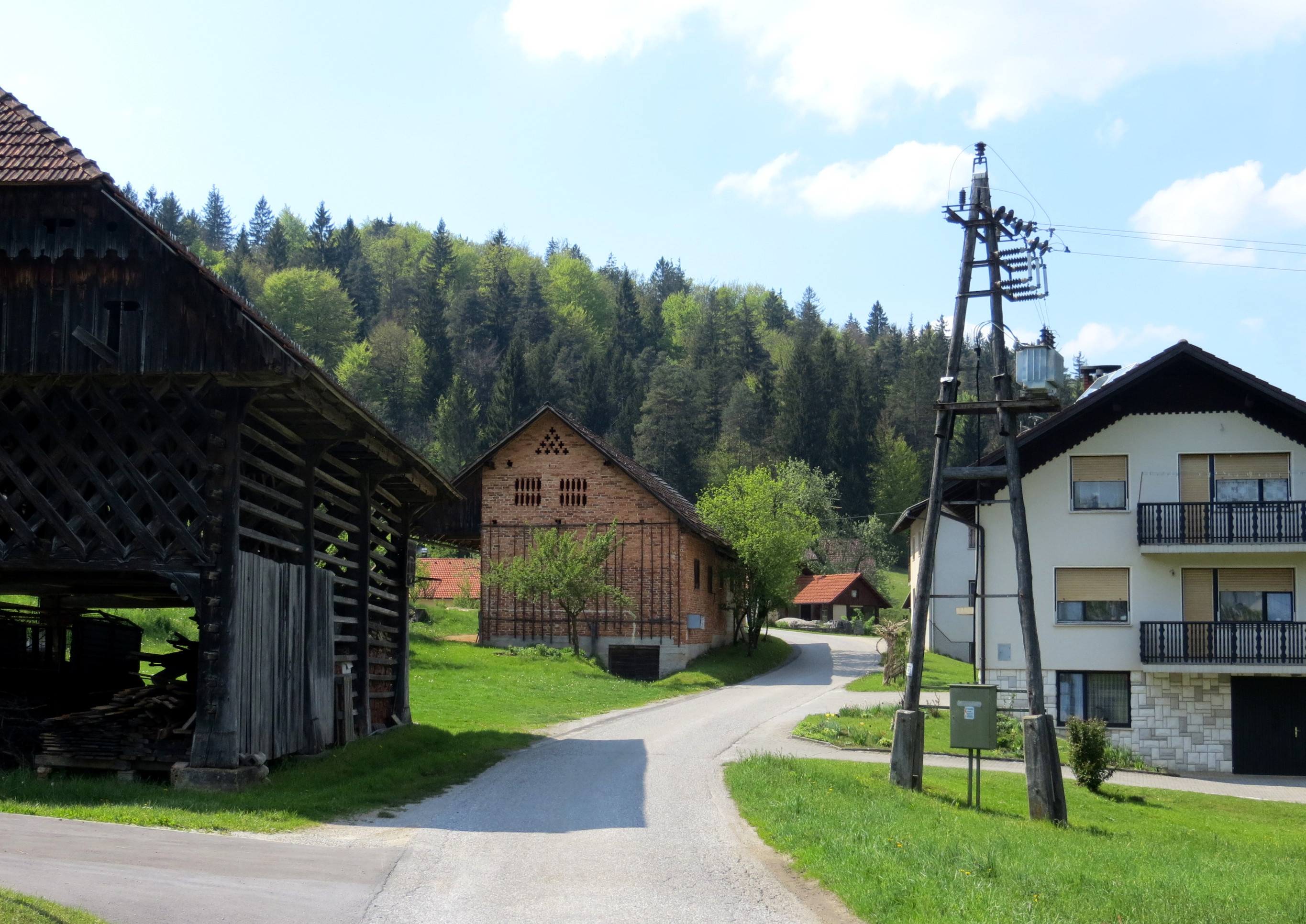

- Location in Slovenia
- Coordinates: 45°57′44.34″N 14°41′4.81″E
- Country: Slovenia
- Traditional region: Lower Carniola
- Statistical region: Central Slovenia
- Municipality: Grosuplje

Area
  - Total: 0.91 km^{2} (0.35 sq mi)
- Elevation: 357 m (1,171 ft)

Population (2002)
  - Total: 36

Spodnje Duplice (pronounced [ˈspoːdnjɛ duˈpliːtsɛ]; in older sources also Dolenje Duplice, German: Unterduplitz) is a small settlement in the Municipality of Grosuplje in central Slovenia. It lies in the hills just east of Grosuplje in the historical region of Lower Carniola. The municipality is now included in the Central Slovenia Statistical Region.
