= Vrbičje =

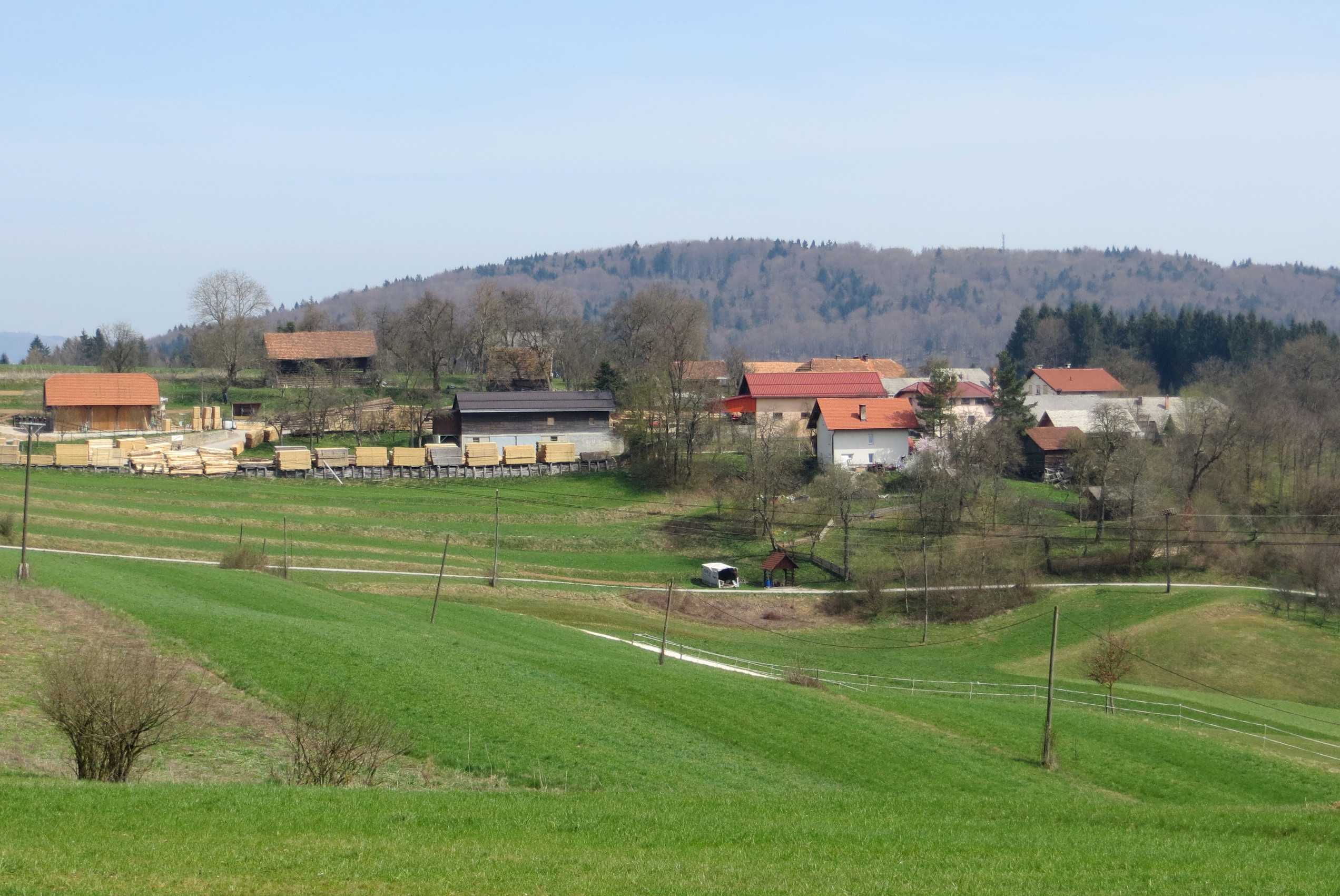

- Location in Slovenia
- Coordinates: 45°55′9.67″N 14°36′41.6″E
- Country: Slovenia
- Traditional region: Lower Carniola
- Statistical region: Central Slovenia
- Municipality: Grosuplje

Area
  - Total: 1.26 km^{2} (0.49 sq mi)
- Elevation: 392.3 m (1,287 ft)

Population (2002)
  - Total: 53

Vrbičje (pronounced [ʋəɾˈbiːtʃjɛ]; German: Werbitsche) is a small settlement southwest of Šent Jurij in the Municipality of Grosuplje in central Slovenia. The area is part of the historical region of Lower Carniola. The municipality is now included in the Central Slovenia Statistical Region.

== Gallery ==
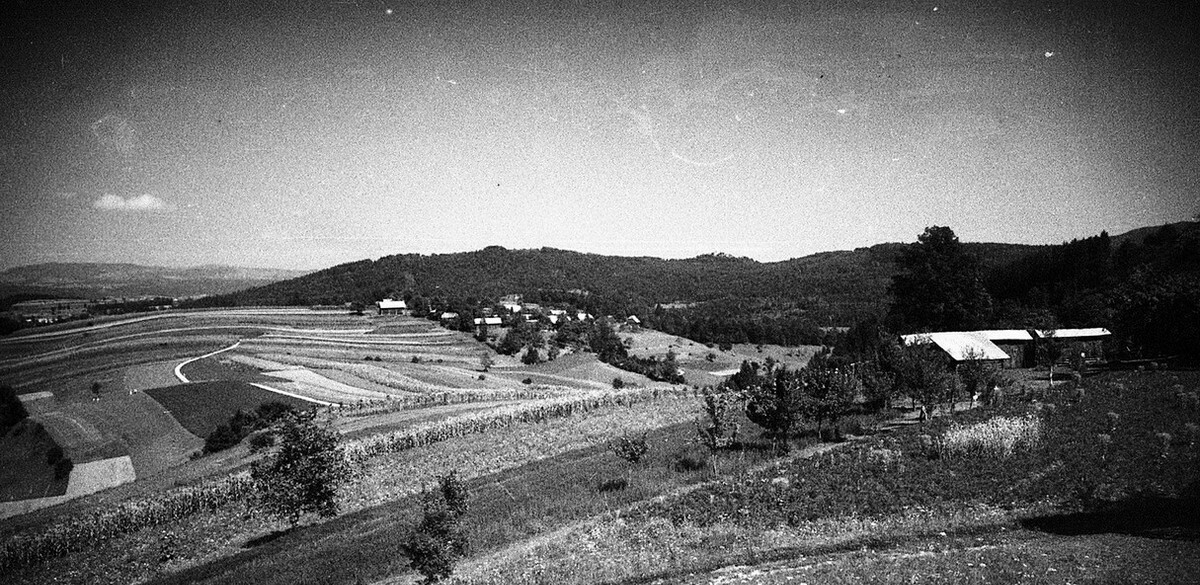
Vrbičje in 1948
