= Gatina, Grosuplje =

Gatina
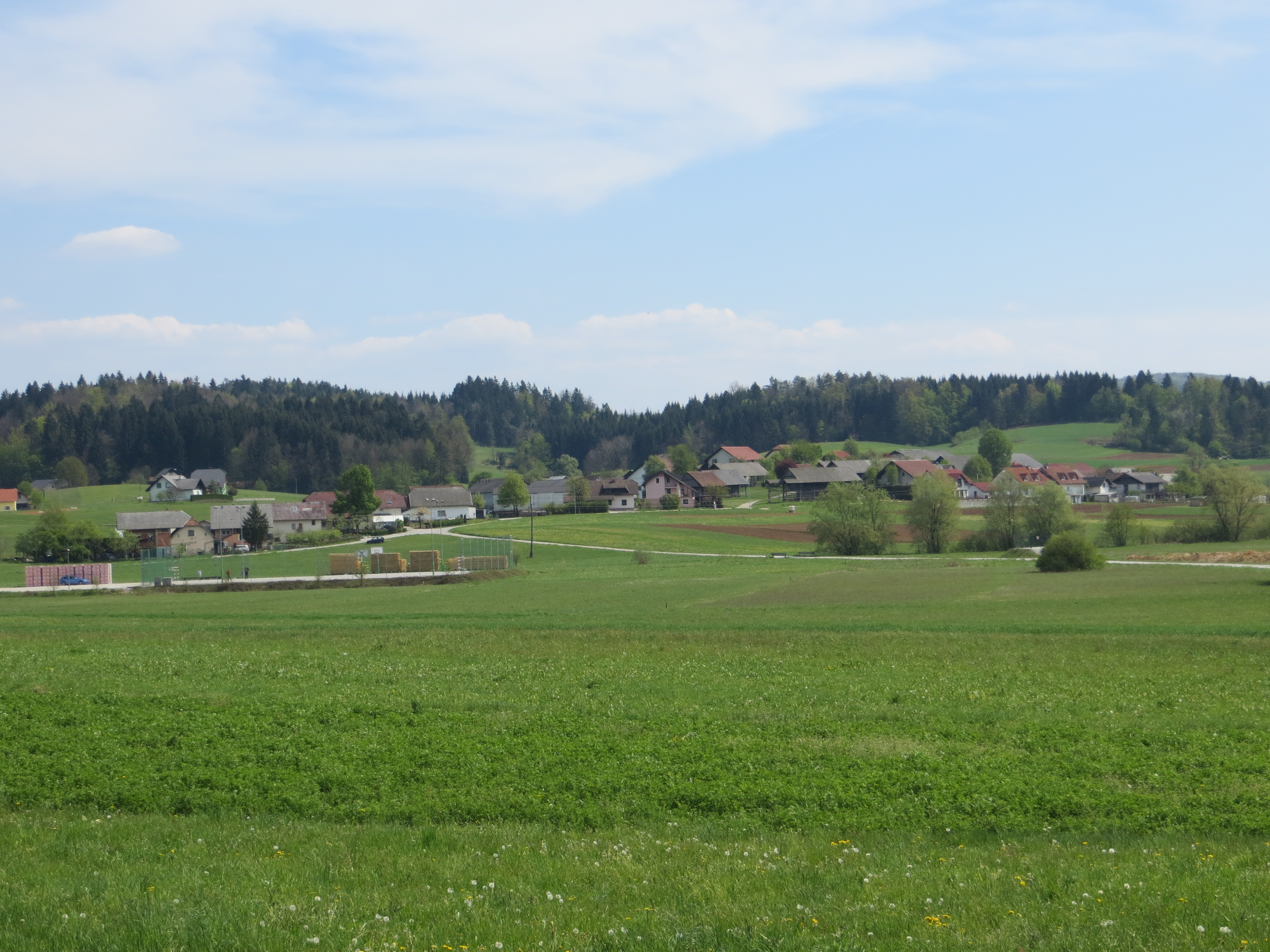

- Location in Slovenia
- Coordinates: 45°56′50.88″N 14°41′1.39″E
- Country: Slovenia
- Traditional region: Lower Carniola
- Statistical region: Central Slovenia
- Municipality: Grosuplje

Area
  - Total: 1.11 km^{2} (0.43 sq mi)
- Elevation: 342.8 m (1,125 ft)

Population (2002)
  - Total: 126

Gatina (pronounced [ɡaˈtiːna]; German: Gattein) is a settlement in the Municipality of Grosuplje in central Slovenia. The area is part of the historical region of Lower Carniola. The municipality is now included in the Central Slovenia Statistical Region.

== Church ==
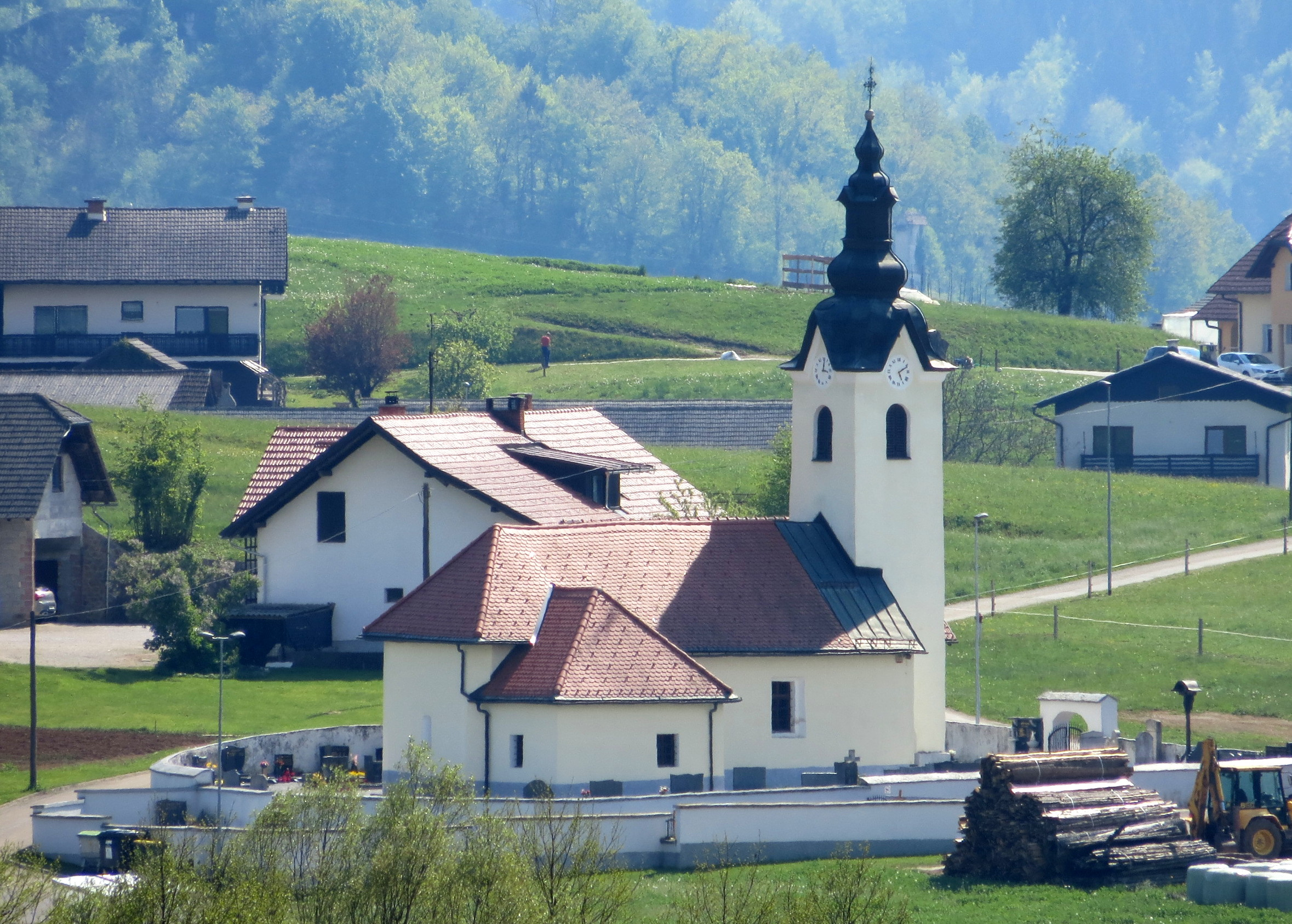
Saint John the Baptist Church

The local church is dedicated to John the Baptist and belongs to the Parish of Grosuplje. It is a medieval building that was extended in the 17th and 19th centuries.
