= Paradiž =

Paradiž may refer to:

- Paradiž, Slovenia, a village near Cirkulane
- Paradiž, Croatia, a village near Sveta Nedelja
