= Gabrje pri Ilovi Gori =

Gabrje pri Ilovi Gori Gabrje (until 1955)
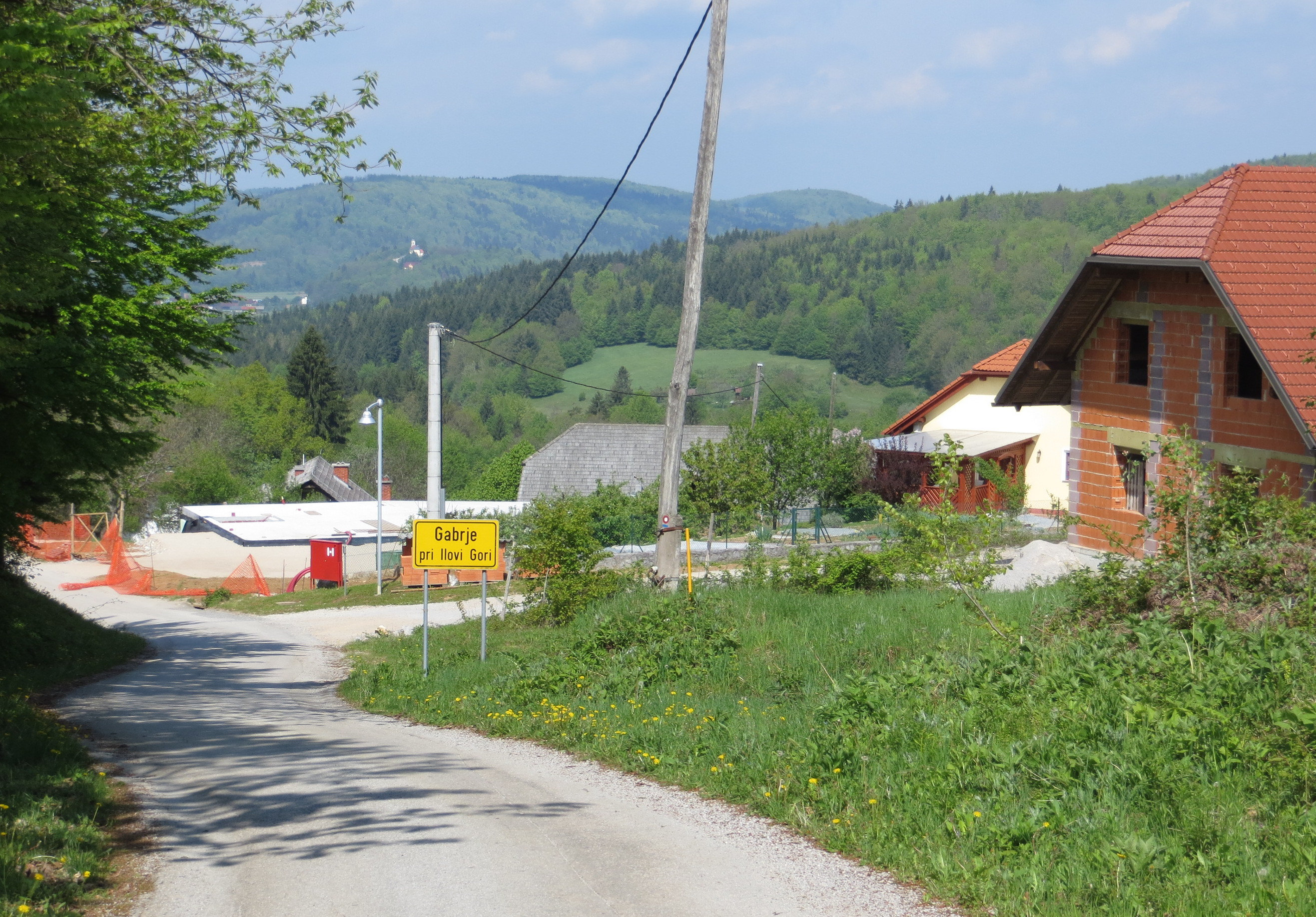

- Location in Slovenia
- Coordinates: 45°53′34.63″N 14°43′24.92″E
- Country: Slovenia
- Traditional region: Lower Carniola
- Statistical region: Central Slovenia
- Municipality: Grosuplje

Area
  - Total: 1.33 km^{2} (0.51 sq mi)
- Elevation: 410.3 m (1,346 ft)

Population (2002)
  - Total: 8

Gabrje pri Ilovi Gori (pronounced [ˈɡaːbəɾjɛ pɾi ˈiːlɔʋi ˈɡɔːɾi]; in older sources also Malo Gaberje, German: Kleingaberje) is a small settlement in the Municipality of Grosuplje in central Slovenia. It lies just west of the village of Velika Ilova Gora in the historical region of Lower Carniola. The municipality is now included in the Central Slovenia Statistical Region.

== Name ==
The name of the settlement was originally Malo Gabrje, later shortened to Gabrje. The name was changed to Gabrje pri Ilovi Gori in 1955. In the past the German name was Kleingaberje.
