= Johannes of Ljubljana =

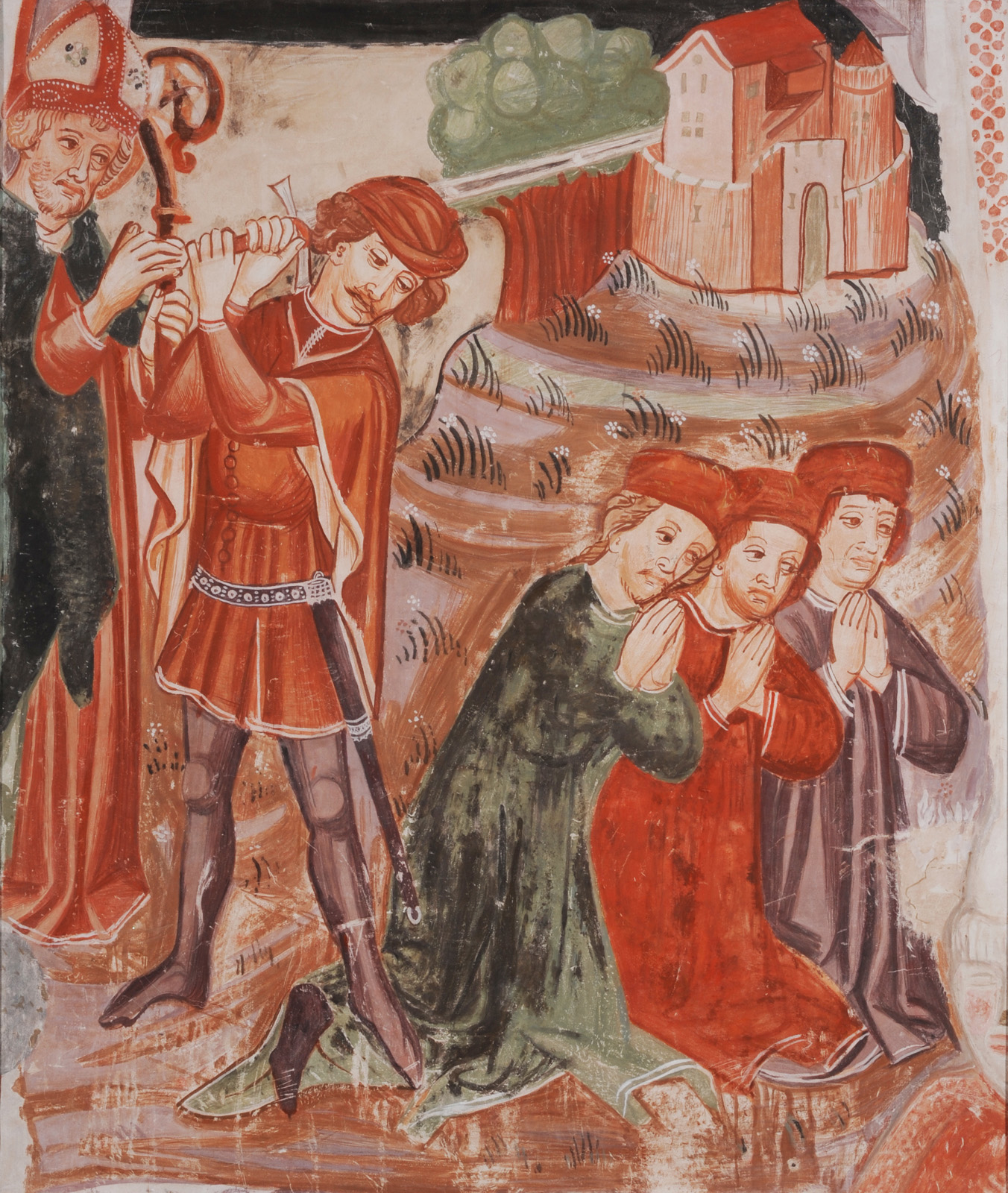
Copy of Johannes of Ljubljana's fresco Saint Nicholas Saves Three Innocents (1443), National Gallery of Slovenia

Johannes of Ljubljana (Latin: Johannes de Laybaco, Slovenized as Janez Ljubljanski), was a painter active between 1433 and 1460.

== Life and work ==
Johannes was the son of Frederic of Villach, and he became a citizen of the town of Ljubljana around 1440. He initially worked in his father's workshop in Carinthia, where he created his first independent works. He is believed to have had close contact with the Cistercians, and in Carniola he worked on commissions from Stična Abbey. His bet-known signed and dated frescoes are in the Gothic Saint Nicholas's Church in Visoko (1443) and in Muljava (1456). A work of his bearing only a date (1459) is found in Saint Peter's Church in Kamni Vrh pri Ambrusu. His independent works also include paintings at the monastery in Stična and at the churches in Metnaj and Mačkovec pri Dvoru, and together with painters from his workshop he also created works in Troščine and at Saint Nicholas's Chapel of Ease in Žužemberk. Products of his workshop are also considered the frescoes in Mengeš and the pilgrimage church dedicated to the Annunciation in Crngrob, where he painted Holy Sunday around 1460.

Johannes brought a late soft style of painting to Carniola from Carinthia, pervaded by Bohemian and Italian influences. His works are characterized by the skill of his workshop, their colorful plastic modeling, idealized calm, and the beauty of the figures. With regard to his iconography, his work shows some adaptation to the painting style common to Carniolan chancels.
