= Troščine =

Troščine Špaja Vas (local name)
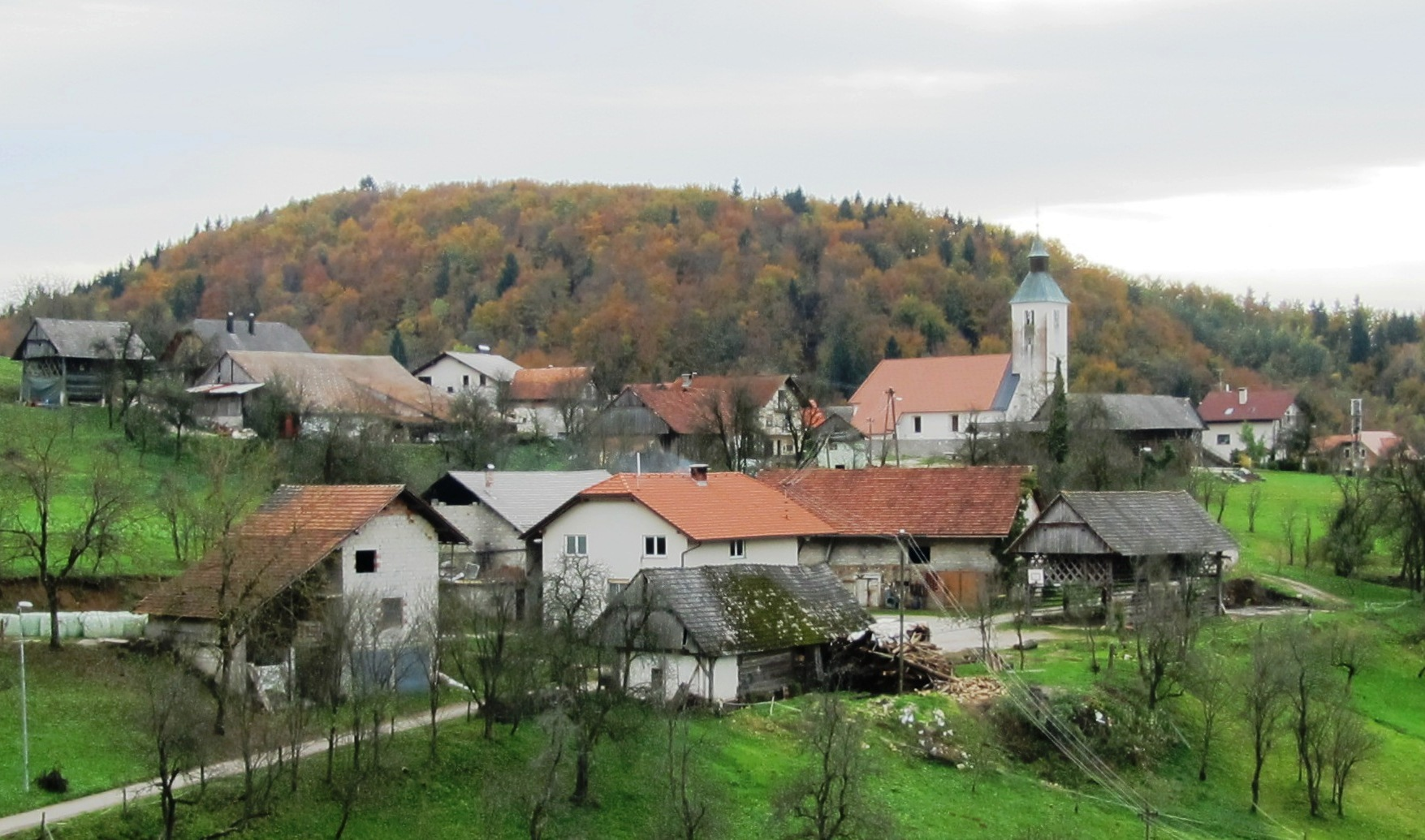
- Troščine

- Location in Slovenia
- Coordinates: 45°59′49.87″N 14°42′10.56″E
- Country: Slovenia
- Traditional region: Lower Carniola
- Statistical region: Central Slovenia
- Municipality: Grosuplje

Area
  - Total: 1.34 km^{2} (0.52 sq mi)
- Elevation: 457.6 m (1,501 ft)

Population (2002)
  - Total: 23

Troščine (pronounced [tɾɔˈʃtʃiːnɛ]; in older sources also Trošine, German: Troschein) is a small village north of Polica in the Municipality of Grosuplje in central Slovenia. The area is part of the historical region of Lower Carniola. The municipality is now included in the Central Slovenia Statistical Region.

== Name ==
Troščine was first mentioned in written sources as Drvssein in 1296 (and as Troschein in 1402, Troschin in 1608, Troſhzina in 1689, and Troſhzhine in 1720). The name is believed to derive from the Slovene common noun trušec 'official responsible for the table' (from Old High German *truh(t)sâʒ(ʒ)o), thus meaning 'settlement where an official lives'. Locally, Troščine is known as Špaja vas, whereas the name Troščine refers to the entire area (including Dolenja Vas pri Polici, Gorenja Vas pri Polici, and Mali Konec). The name Špaja vas was first attested in written sources in 1710 as Supaina vaſs (and as Shpanjavaſs in 1720 and ex Spane vaſsi in 1780). This can be derived from *Županja vas '(local) leader's village', semantically agreeing with the origin of the name Troščine. In the past the German name was Troschein.

== History ==
Troščine had nine houses and a population of 49 in 1936. Before the Second World War, the economy of the village was based on agriculture, and the sale of cattle, pigs, timber, and firewood. On 20 March 1943 the bodies of five murdered men, known as the Dobrunje and Bizovik victims, were discovered buried in Krčmar's Woods (Slovene: Krčmarjeva hosta) south of Troščine.

== Church ==
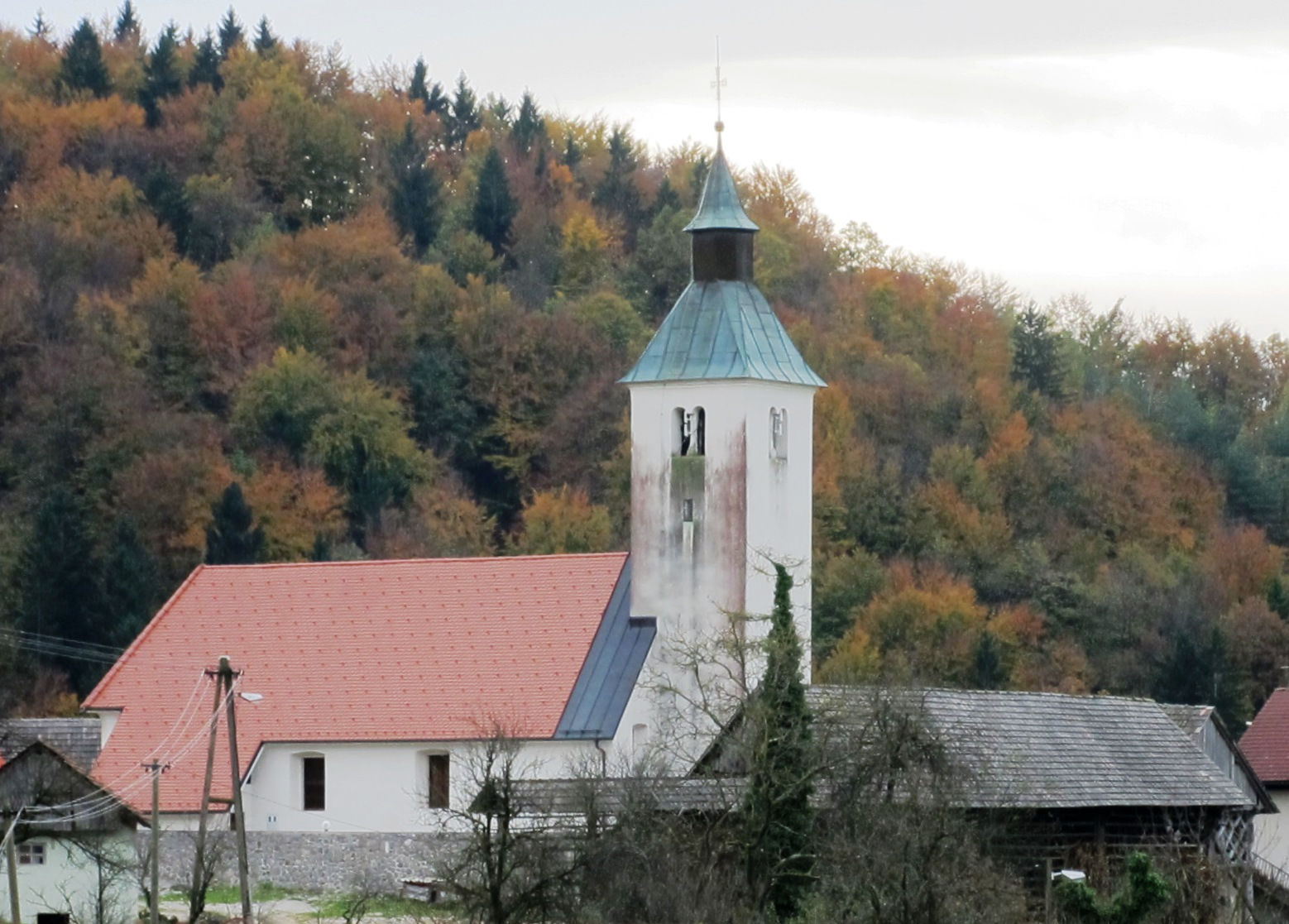
Visitation Church

The local church is dedicated to the Visitation of Mary and belongs to the Parish of Polica. It is a Gothic building with an older nave. There was once a pilgrimage route to the church. The church was reworked and vaulted in 1882: prior to this it had a wooden ceiling in the nave painted with animal motifs. On the exterior of the church there is a fresco dating to 1444 depicting Saint Christopher; frescoes of the same age are located behind the side altars. All three altars in the church date from the first half of the 17th century, and additions were made to them in the 19th century. There is a cemetery next to the church.
