= Morava, Žužemberk =

Morava
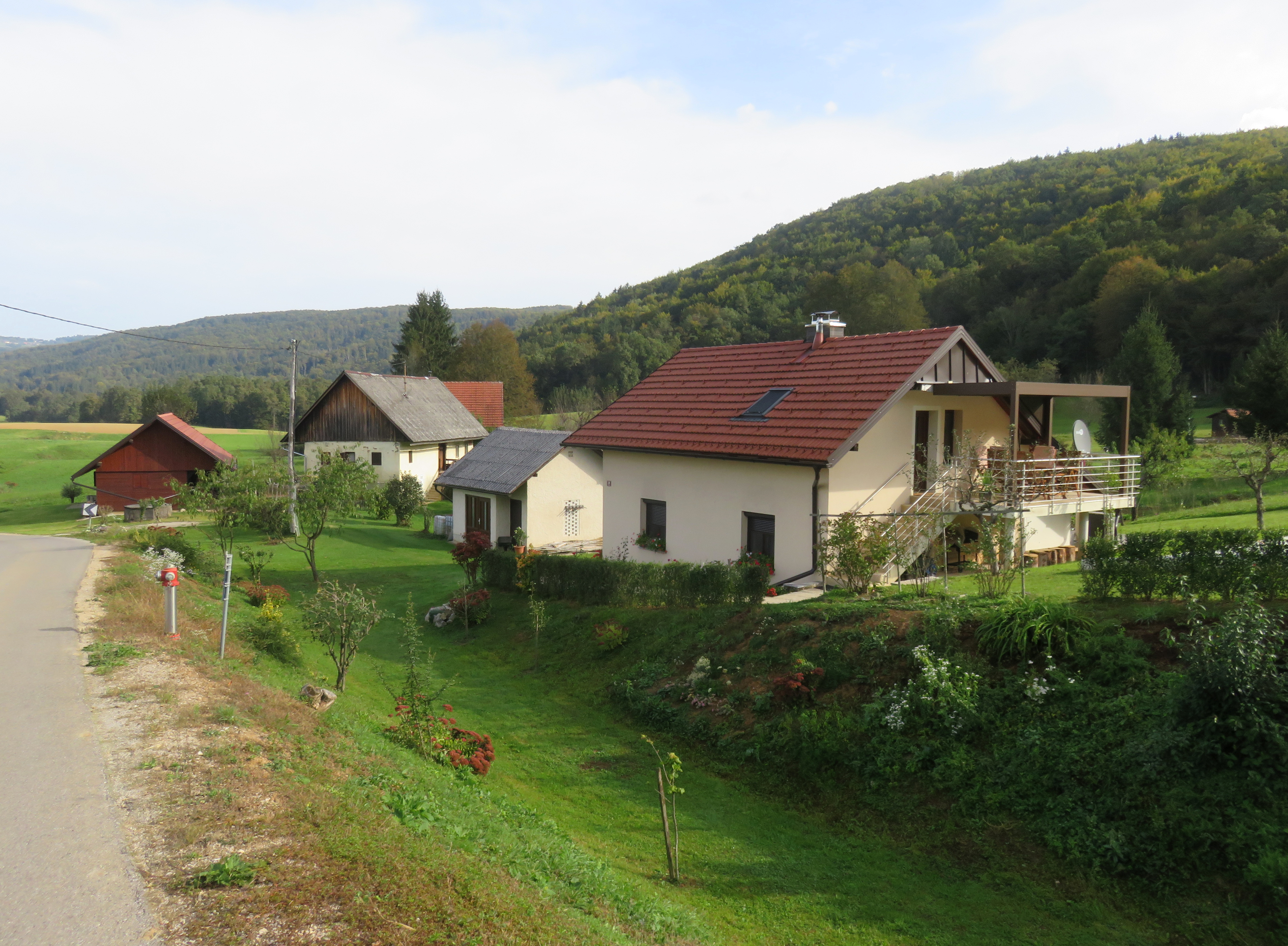

- Location in Slovenia
- Coordinates: 45°50′18″N 15°00′10″E
- Country: Slovenia
- Traditional region: Lower Carniola
- Statistical region: Central Slovenia
- Municipality: Žužemberk
- Elevation: 240 m (790 ft)

Morava (pronounced [mɔˈɾaːʋa], German: Morawa) is a formerly independent settlement east of Mačkovec pri Dvoru in southeast Slovenia. It is now part of the village of Podlipa. It belongs to the Municipality of Žužemberk. It is part of the traditional region of Lower Carniola and is now included with the rest of the municipality in the Southeast Slovenia Statistical Region.

== Geography ==
Morava stands southeast of the main settlement of Podlipa. It consists of three farms. There is an intermittent spring named Beč in the hamlet.

== History ==
Morava had a population of 14 in two houses in 1870, 17 in two houses in 1880, 10 in two houses in 1890, five in two houses in 1900, and 15 in two houses in 1931. Morava was annexed by Podlipa in 1953, ending its existence as an independent settlement.
