= Skopice =

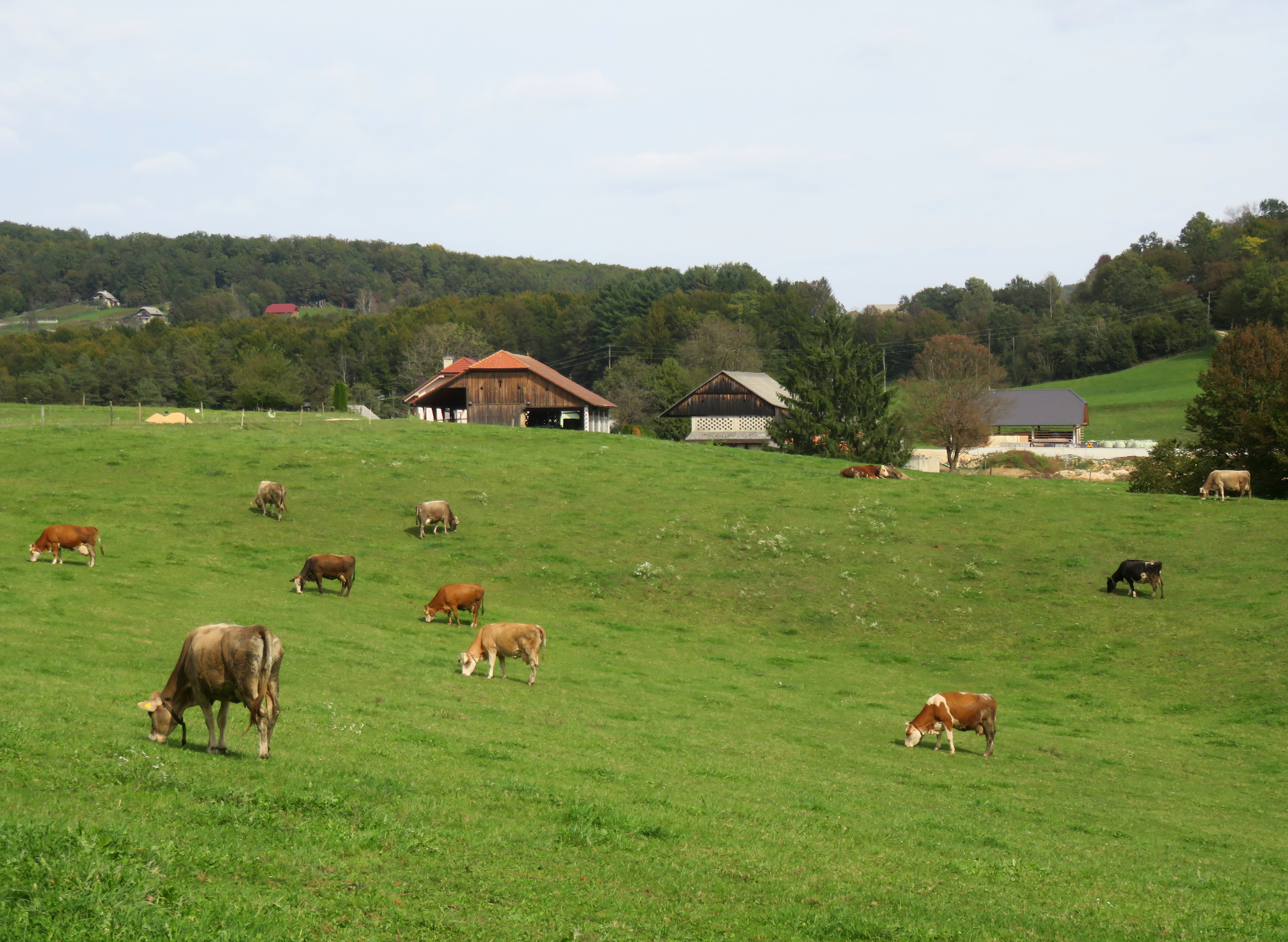

- Location in Slovenia
- Coordinates: 45°48′55″N 14°59′11″E
- Country: Slovenia
- Traditional region: Lower Carniola
- Statistical region: Central Slovenia
- Municipality: Žužemberk
- Elevation: 307 m (1,007 ft)

Skopice (pronounced [skɔˈpiːtsɛ], German: Skopiza) is a formerly independent settlement east of Mačkovec pri Dvoru in southeast Slovenia. It is now part of the village of Vinkov Vrh. It belongs to the Municipality of Žužemberk. It is part of the traditional region of Lower Carniola and is now included with the rest of the municipality in the Southeast Slovenia Statistical Region.

== Geography ==
Skopice stands northeast of the main settlement of Vinkov Vrh. It consists of two farms.

== History ==
Skopice had a population of 10 in two houses in 1870 and 1880, 12 in two houses in 1890, and 16 in two houses in 1900 and 1931. Skopice was annexed by Vinkov Vrh in 1953, ending its existence as an independent settlement.
