= Plano, Žužemberk =

Plano
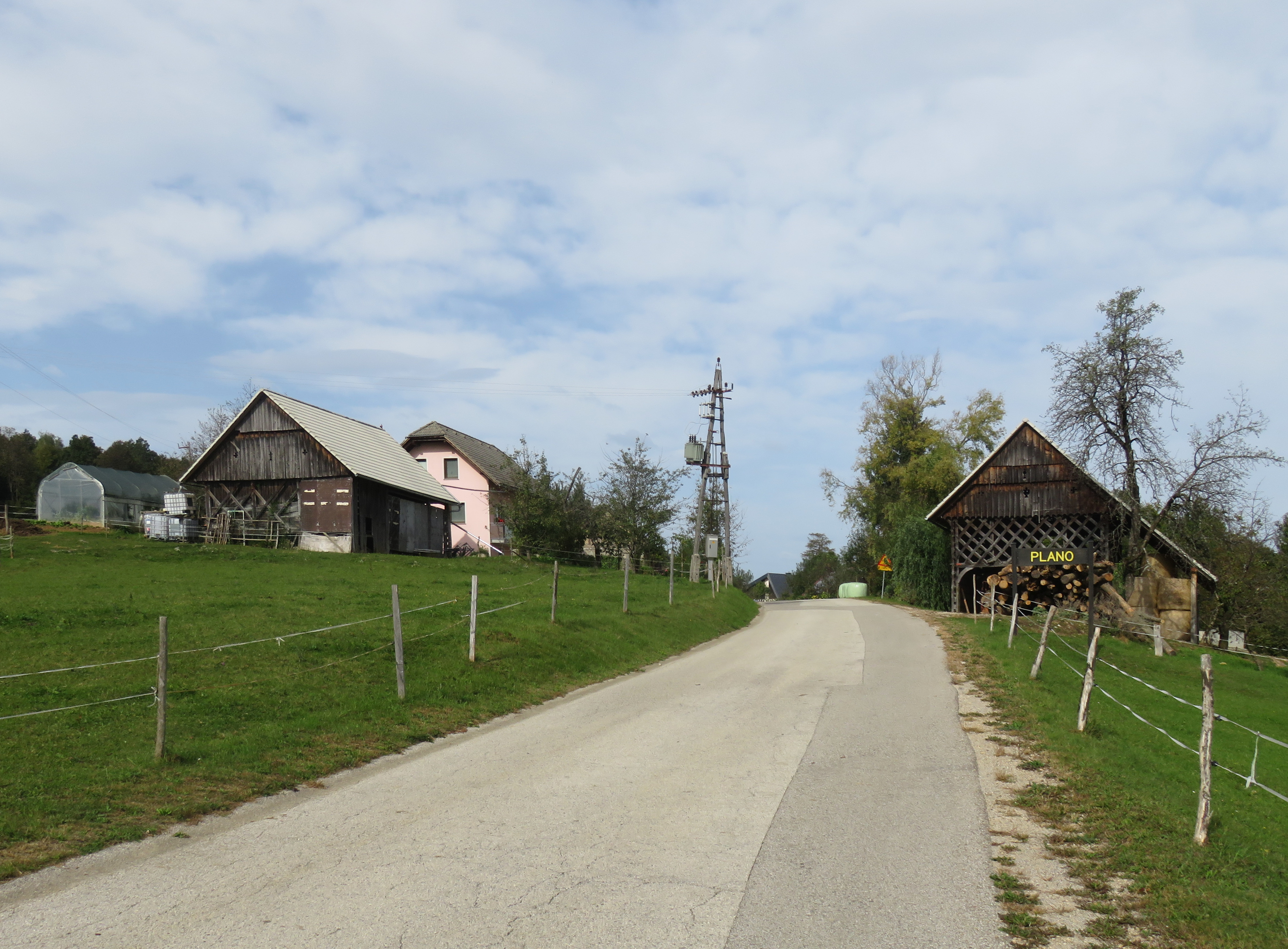

- Location in Slovenia
- Coordinates: 45°49′35″N 15°01′26″E
- Country: Slovenia
- Traditional region: Lower Carniola
- Statistical region: Central Slovenia
- Municipality: Žužemberk
- Elevation: 448 m (1,470 ft)

Plano (pronounced [ˈplaːnɔ], German: Planu) is a formerly independent settlement east of Žužemberk in southeast Slovenia. It is now part of the village of Dolnji Ajdovec. It belongs to the Municipality of Žužemberk. It is part of the traditional region of Lower Carniola and is now included with the rest of the municipality in the Southeast Slovenia Statistical Region.

== Geography ==
Plano stands on a small hill east of Dolnji Ajdovec. The smaller hamlet of Frata, which has a hiking lodge, lies east of Plano. Gomila Hill (537 meters or 1,762 feet) rises south of the settlement.

== Name ==
The name Plano has been suggested to refer to the open, level, elevated terrain of the village (cf. planota 'plateau').

== History ==
Plano had a population of 15 (in three houses) in 1900 and 16 (in three houses) in 1931. Plano was annexed by Dolnji Ajdovec in 1953, ending its existence as an independent settlement.
