= Poljane pri Stični =

Poljane pri Stični Poljane (until 1953)
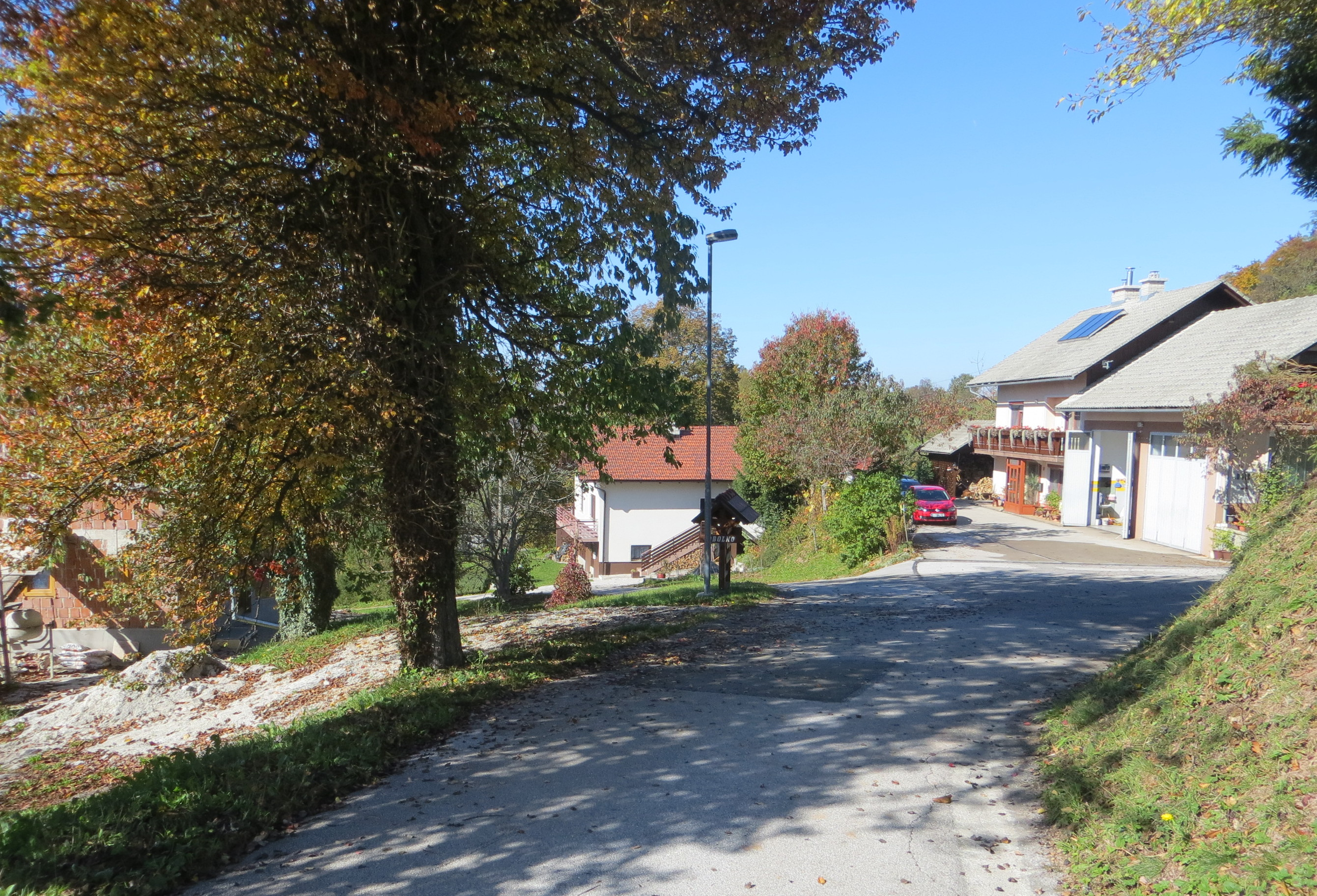

- Location in Slovenia
- Coordinates: 45°59′30.39″N 14°46′38.34″E
- Country: Slovenia
- Traditional region: Lower Carniola
- Statistical region: Central Slovenia
- Municipality: Ivančna Gorica

Area
  - Total: 2.36 km^{2} (0.91 sq mi)
- Elevation: 637.1 m (2,090 ft)

Population (2002)
  - Total: 32

Poljane pri Stični (pronounced [pɔˈljaːnɛ pɾi ˈstiːtʃni]) is a small settlement in the Municipality of Ivančna Gorica in central Slovenia. It lies beyond Metnaj to the north of Stična in the traditional region of Lower Carniola. The municipality is now included in the Central Slovenia Statistical Region.

== Name ==
The name of the settlement was changed from Poljane to Poljane pri Stični in 1953.
