= Giantess of Crngrob =

Slovenian mythical heroine

The Giantess of Crngrob (Slovene: ajdovska deklica) is a Slovene mythical figure associated with the construction of Annunciation Church in Crngrob near Škofja Loka. This legend is one of the best-known Slovene stories about giants.

== The legend ==
The legend tells that a young giantess once lived in the forests of Crngrob. She was a shepherdess. She grazed her flock of sheep by the Selca Sora River, and the number of sheep grew day by day. She drank water from the Sava River and lacked nothing. One day, the lord of Škofja Loka ordered his serfs to build a large church in Crngrob. The serfs worked hard, but the proud lord was never satisfied with the church's size. So they kept building, yet it still wasn't enough. The serfs became completely exhausted. The giant girl took pity on them and began to help. She carried huge stones in her apron and fetched water from the Sava in a large bucket to mix mortar. Thanks to her help, the church was soon completed. However, the giant girl had worked so hard that she caught a cold, fell ill, and died. The serfs were deeply grateful for her help. They buried her in the forests of Crngrob, but first they took one of her ribs and hung it in the new church as a memorial. According to local tradition, a drop of blood drips from the rib every year. When the final drop falls, the Day of Judgment will come.

== The rib ==
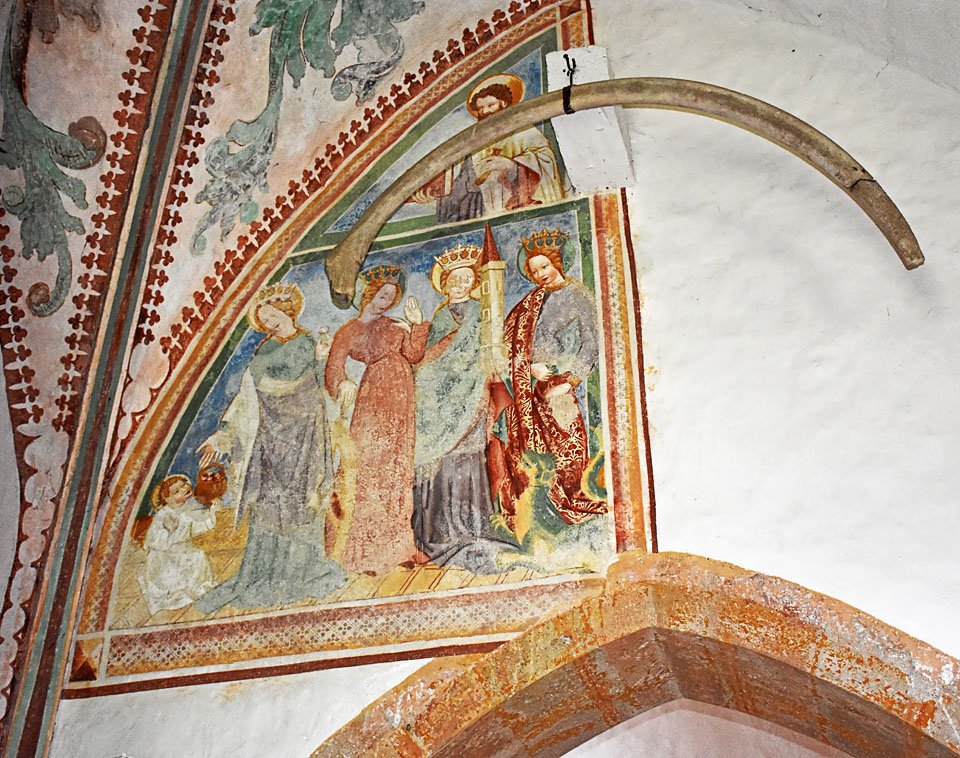
The whale rib in Annunciation Church in Crngrob

Annunciation Church stands on the edge of the Sora Plain, below Križna Gora. In the oldest part of the church, dating back to the 13th century, a whale rib hangs on the wall. According to legend, this is the rib of the giantess. The ancestors of the local population came from what is now Germany. Long after they settled in the area, they continued to make pilgrimages to their ancestral home. On one such trip, they brought the whale rib from Cologne, where it had been found, back to Crngrob as a keepsake. The rib has been hanging in the church for over 500 years.
