= Crngrob =

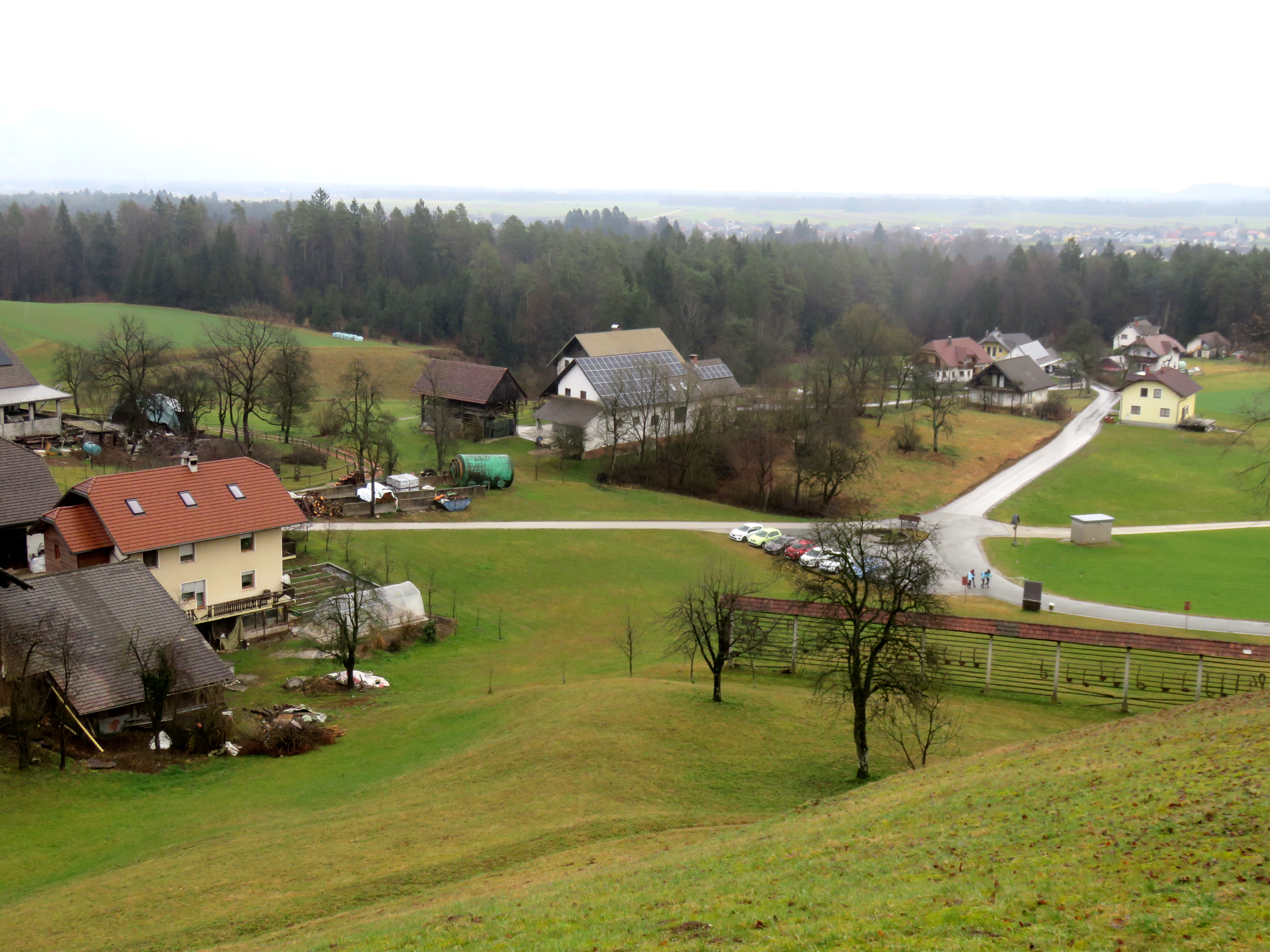

- Location in Slovenia
- Coordinates: 46°11′55.15″N 14°18′30.51″E
- Country: Slovenia
- Traditional region: Upper Carniola
- Statistical region: Upper Carniola
- Municipality: Škofja Loka

Area
  - Total: 1.25 km^{2} (0.48 sq mi)
- Elevation: 393.1 m (1,290 ft)

Population (2002)
  - Total: 33

Crngrob (pronounced [ˈtsəɾnɡɾɔp]; German: Ehrengruben) is a small village in the Municipality of Škofja Loka in the Upper Carniola region of Slovenia.

== Name ==
Crngrob was first attested in written sources as Erngrůb in 1291 (and as Errengrůb in 1318 and Erngruben in 1423 (Note: Contrary to other sources, Marko Snoj gives the years 1381 and 1421 instead of 1318 and 1423.)). The Slovene name is borrowed from the Middle High German prepositional phrase ze Erngruben, literally 'at Erngrub'. The German name is a compound of ern 'to plow (up)' or erde '(fertile) soil' + gruobe 'depression, basin' and may refer to a mammoth rib dug up at the site (now hanging in the church), to a robber's hideout in a cave, or to the small fertile valley where the settlement is located. For similar Slovene geographical names based on foreign-language prepositional phrases of location, compare Cmurek, Cven, Dragonja, Sostro, and Spuhlja. In the past the German name was Ehrengruben.

== History ==
Crngrob was recorded in documents from the 13th century onward. Much of the history of the village is dominated by that of its church. During the Second World War, German forces attacked the Partisan Selca Company above the village on 27 March 1942. Fifteen Partisans were killed in the attack.

=== Mass graves ===
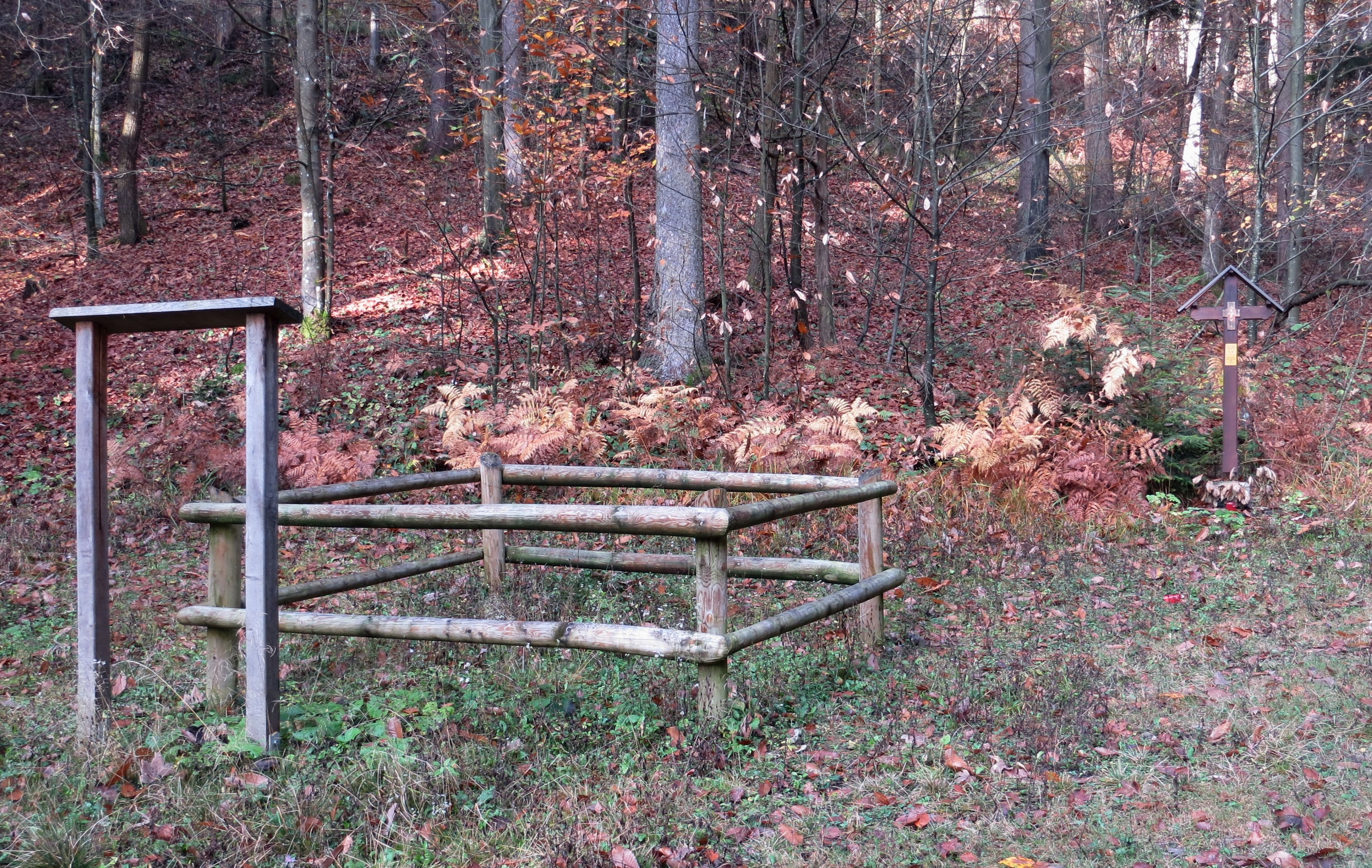
Crngrob 5 Mass Grave

Crngrob is the site of five known mass graves from the end of the Second World War. The Crngrob 1–5 mass graves (Slovene: Grobišče Crngrob 1–5)—also known as the Steps Mass Grave (Grobišče pri štengah) or the Balant Spruce Woods Mass Grave (Grobišča v Balantovem smrečju)—are located along a gravel path in the woods southwest of the settlement. They contain the remains of 200 to 300 victims, including leading members of the government of the Independent State of Croatia and their family members, and possibly Slovene Home Guard members as well. Most of the victims were murdered between May 22 and 25, 1945. Some were killed as early as May 20, and some also after May.

== Church and religious heritage ==
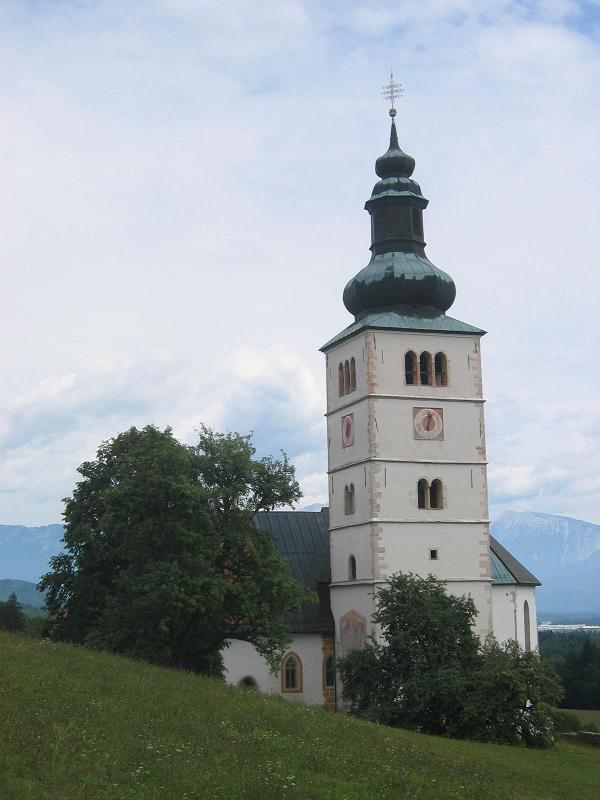
Annunciation Church

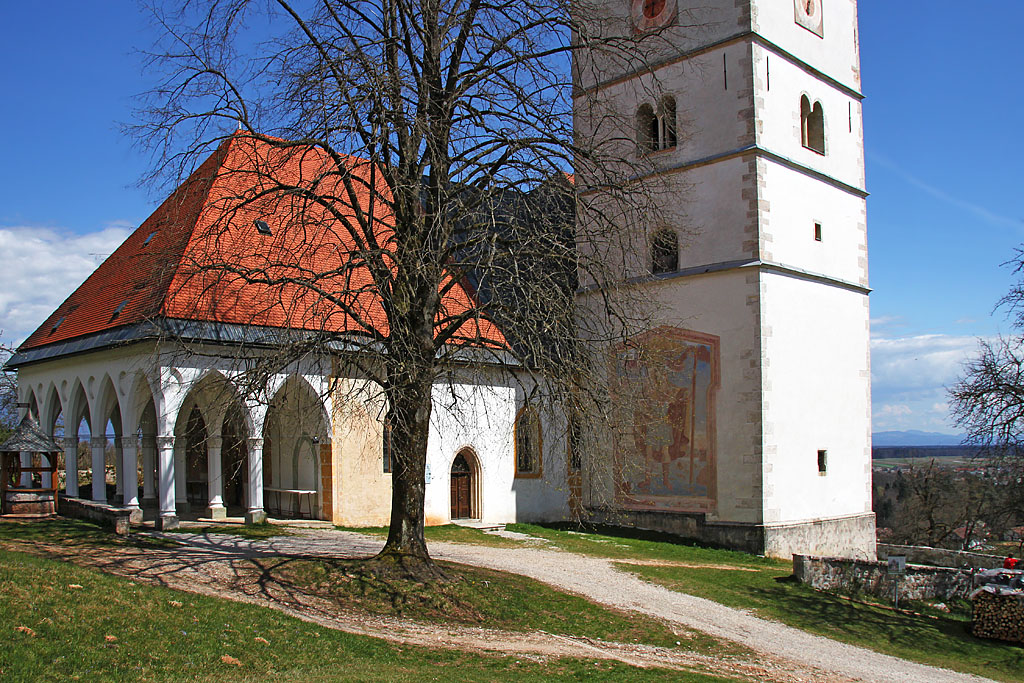
Annunciation church

Crngrob is best known for its pilgrimage church dedicated to the Annunciation. The first mention of a church at this site dates to the late 13th century. In the 14th century it was expanded, and after 1410 a southern arcade was built. In the mid-15th century a third aisle was added and in 1551 the belfry was heightened and in 1661 its onion-shaped dome was built. Its characteristic neogothic columned porch was erected in 1858.

The church's artwork includes a painting of Holy Sunday from the workshop of Johannes of Ljubljana (c. 1460), a Gothic painting of Saint Christopher on the south wall from 1464, a painting of Saint Christopher on the bell tower, and remnants of frescoes from the 14th and 15th centuries on the north wall of the nave. There are four 17th-century gilded altars where the nave meets the chancel; above the altar dedicated to Saint Martin there hangs a whale rib, referred to as the rib of a giantess in popular tradition. The main altar was created in 1652 by the Ljubljana sculptor Jurij Skarnos and was gilded by Jakob Jamšek of Škofja Loka. The forged railing in front of the main altar was created by the Škofja Loka locksmith Gregor Jesenko. The Baroque organ, work by the organ builder Joannes Franciscus Janecheck, dates to 1743.

The church was a popular pilgrimage destination in the past, and so there are many wayside shrines along the routes leading to the church. The Red Shrine stands along the road to Škofja Loka. It has frescoes from the 16th century and is one of the oldest shrines in Slovenia. The Oman Chapel-Shrine near the woods contains an 18th-century carving by a peasant artist, and below the church there is another chapel-shrine from the 18th century that was painted by Anton Tušek.

== Legend ==
A local legend says that the old part of the church was built by a giantess (Slovenian: ajdovska deklica), who took mercy on the serfs that suffered while building it and helped them. She died soon after the church was built, and the thankful serfs hung her rib in the new church. In reality the rib that still hangs in church is a whale rib.

== Hauntings and paranormal activity ==
Local folklore and anecdotal reports have long associated Crngrob with paranormal activity, particularly in the vicinity of the mass grave sites. According to residents and visitors, ghostly apparitions, unexplained noises, and feelings of unease have been experienced near the Crngrob 1–5 mass graves, especially during the early morning or twilight hours. These reports are often linked to the traumatic events that took place at the end of the Second World War, when the area saw the execution and burial of hundreds of victims.

Locals have shared stories of mysterious figures dressed in wartime clothing, disembodied voices speaking in German or Croatian, and sudden drops in temperature near the forested paths leading to the graves. Although these claims remain unverified and are considered folklore by historians and officials, they continue to draw interest from paranormal enthusiasts and curious visitors. No formal investigations have been conducted, but the stories have contributed to Crngrob's reputation as one of Slovenia's most spiritually charged historical locations.

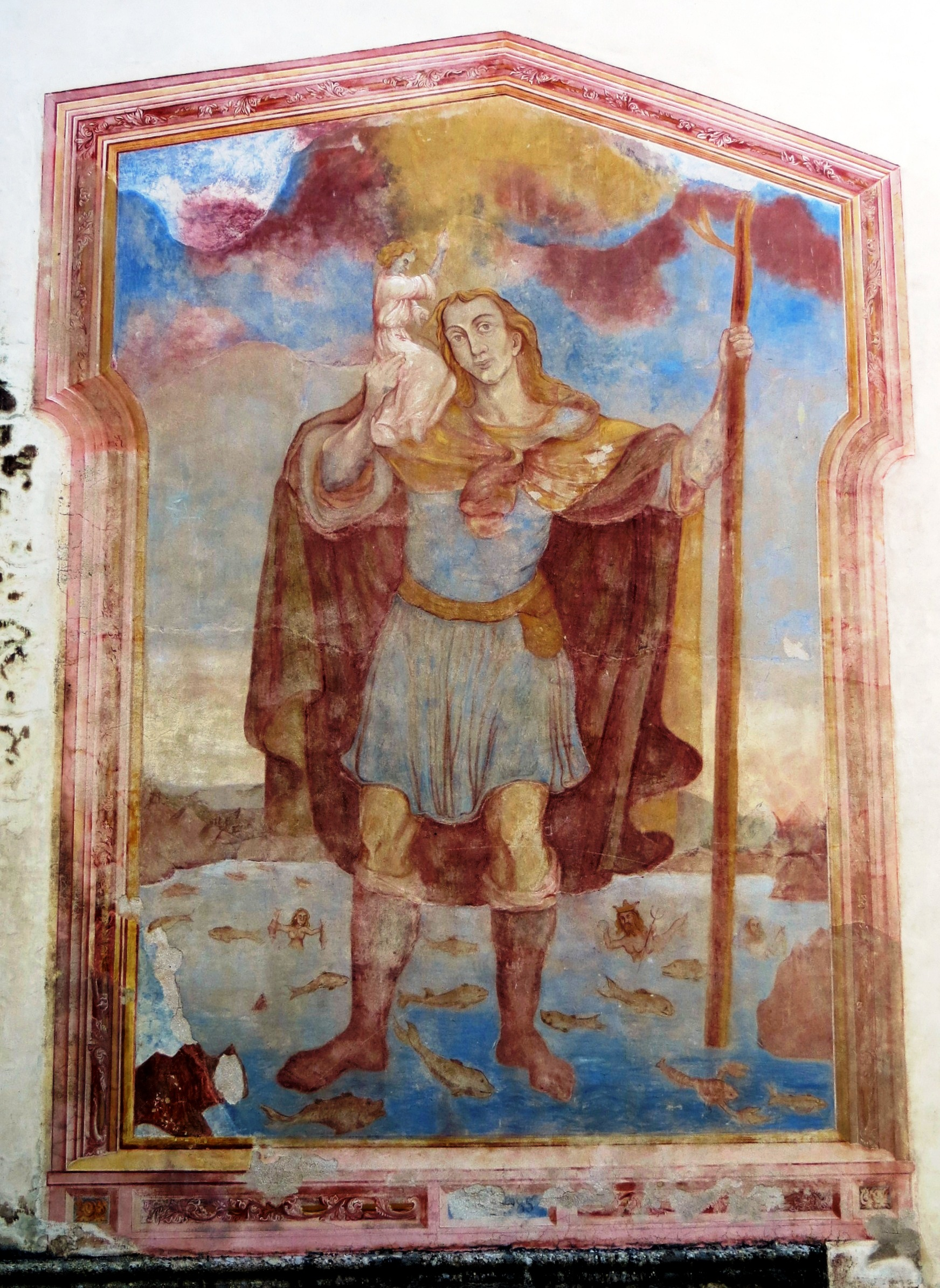
Church fresco

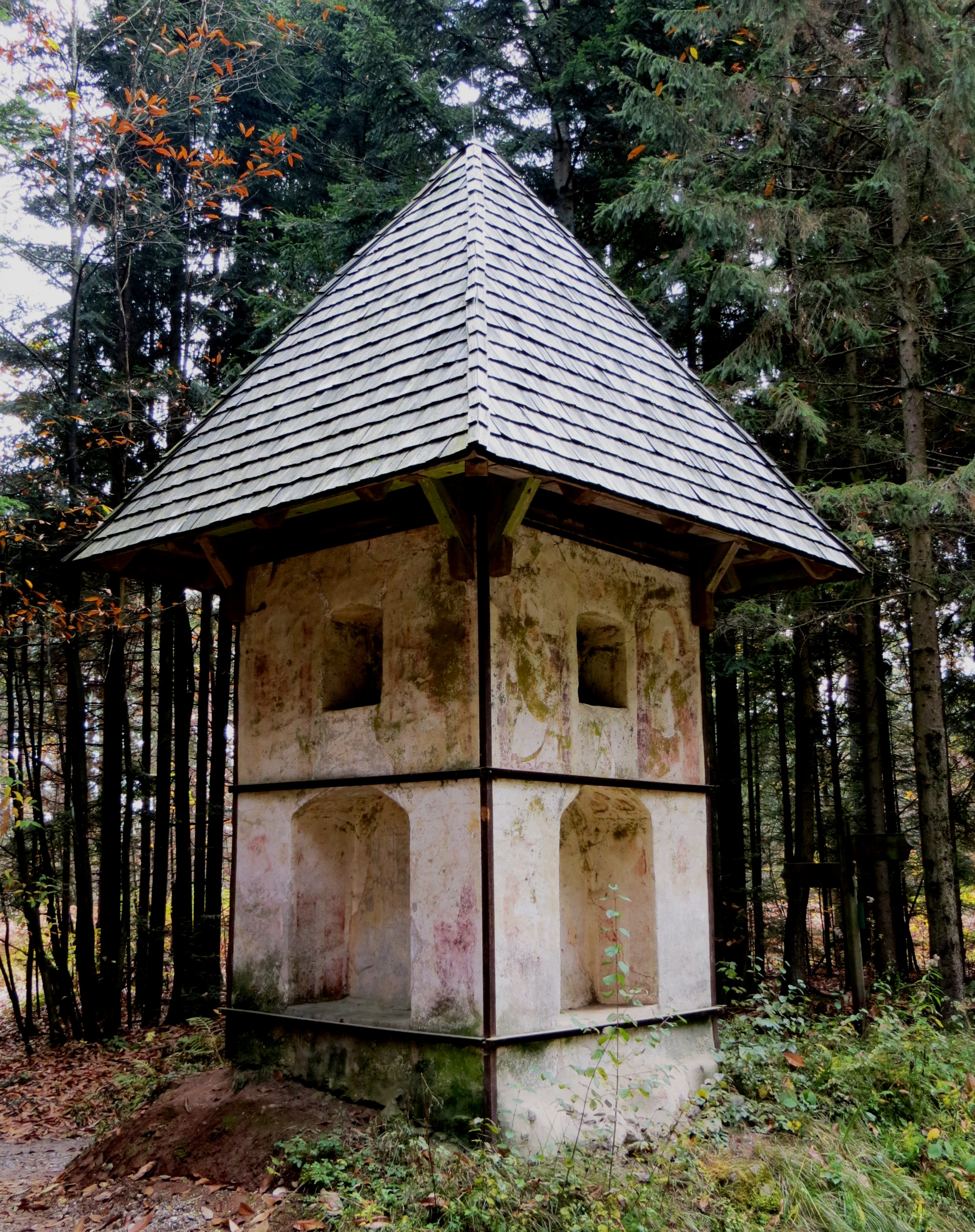
Red Shrine

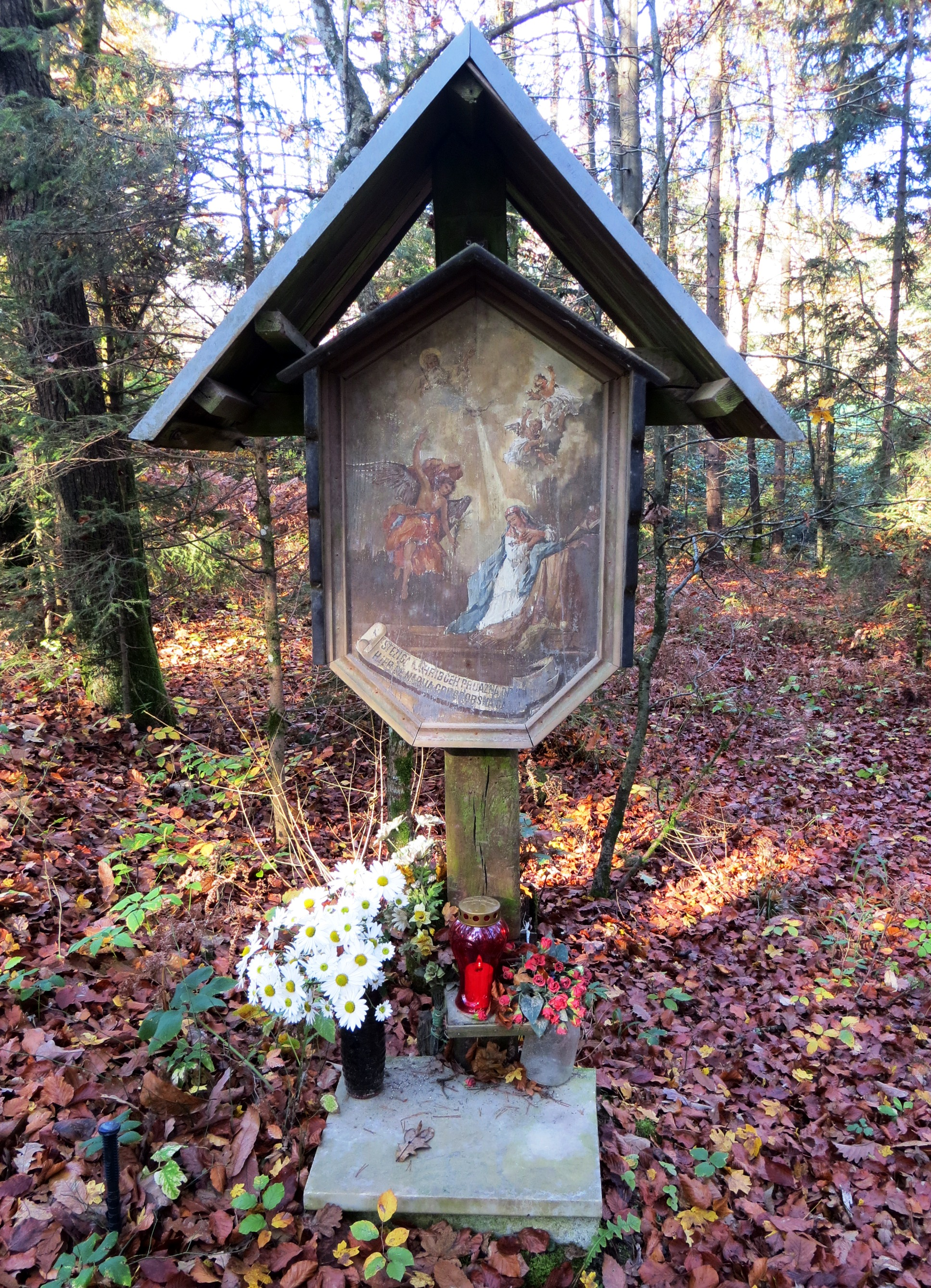
Wooden shrine
