= Gorenja Vas pri Polici =

Gorenja Vas pri Polici Gorenja Vas (until 1953)
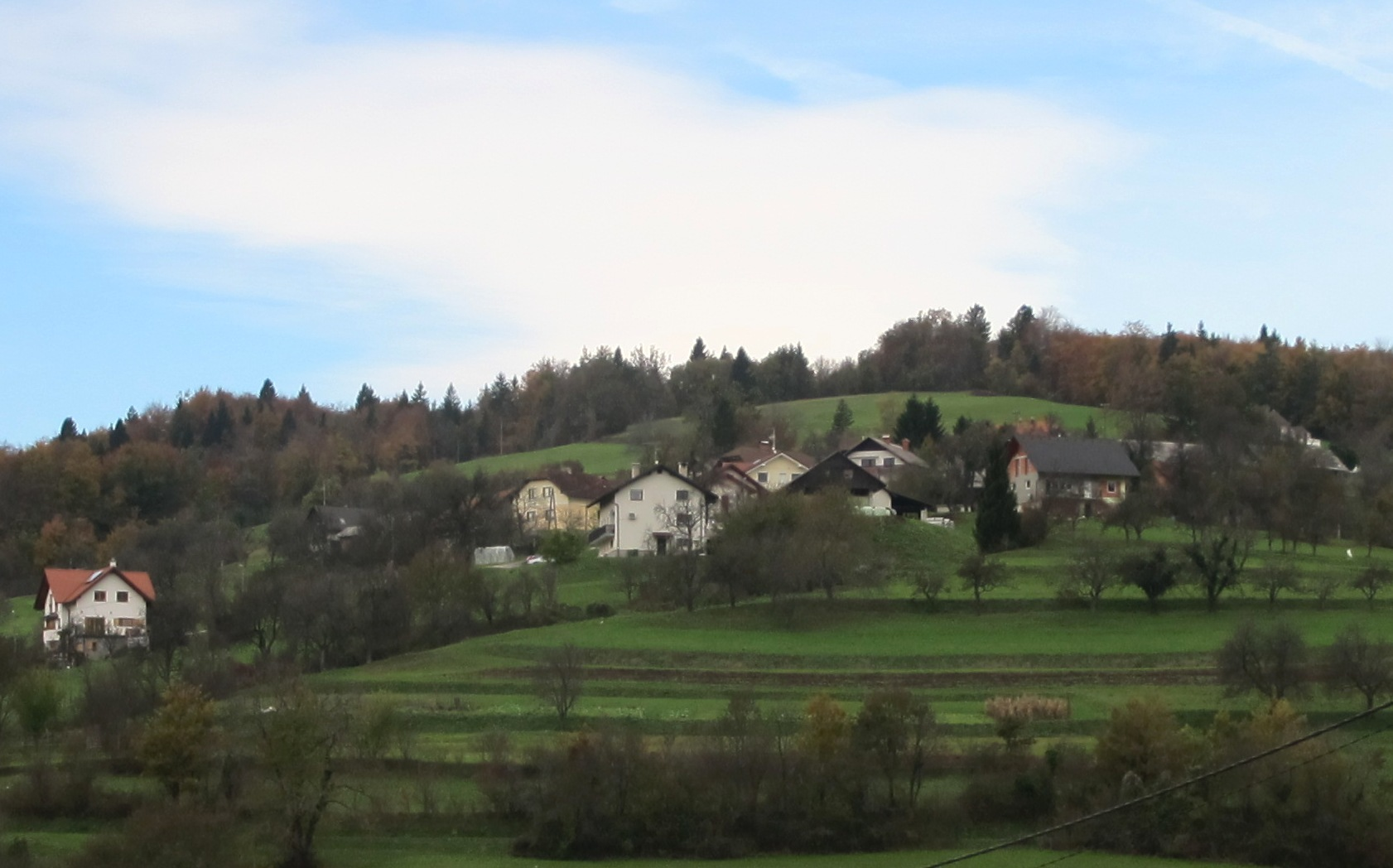
- Gorenja Vas pri Polici

- Location in Slovenia
- Coordinates: 45°59′56.27″N 14°41′39.85″E
- Country: Slovenia
- Traditional region: Lower Carniola
- Statistical region: Central Slovenia
- Municipality: Grosuplje

Area
  - Total: 1.76 km^{2} (0.68 sq mi)
- Elevation: 502.4 m (1,648 ft)

Population (2002)
  - Total: 56

Gorenja Vas pri Polici (pronounced [ɡɔˈɾeːnja ˈʋaːs pɾi pɔˈliːtsi]; Slovene: Gorenja vas pri Polici, German: Oberdorf) is a small settlement in the hills north of Polica in the Municipality of Grosuplje in central Slovenia. The area is part of the historical region of Lower Carniola. The municipality is now included in the Central Slovenia Statistical Region.

== Name ==
The name of the settlement was changed from Gorenja vas to Gorenja vas pri Polici in 1953. In the past the German name was Oberdorf.

== Cultural heritage ==
A small chapel-shrine in the village is dedicated to the Virgin Mary and was built in 1911.
