= Dolenja Vas pri Polici =

Dolenja Vas pri Polici Dolenja Vas (until 1953)
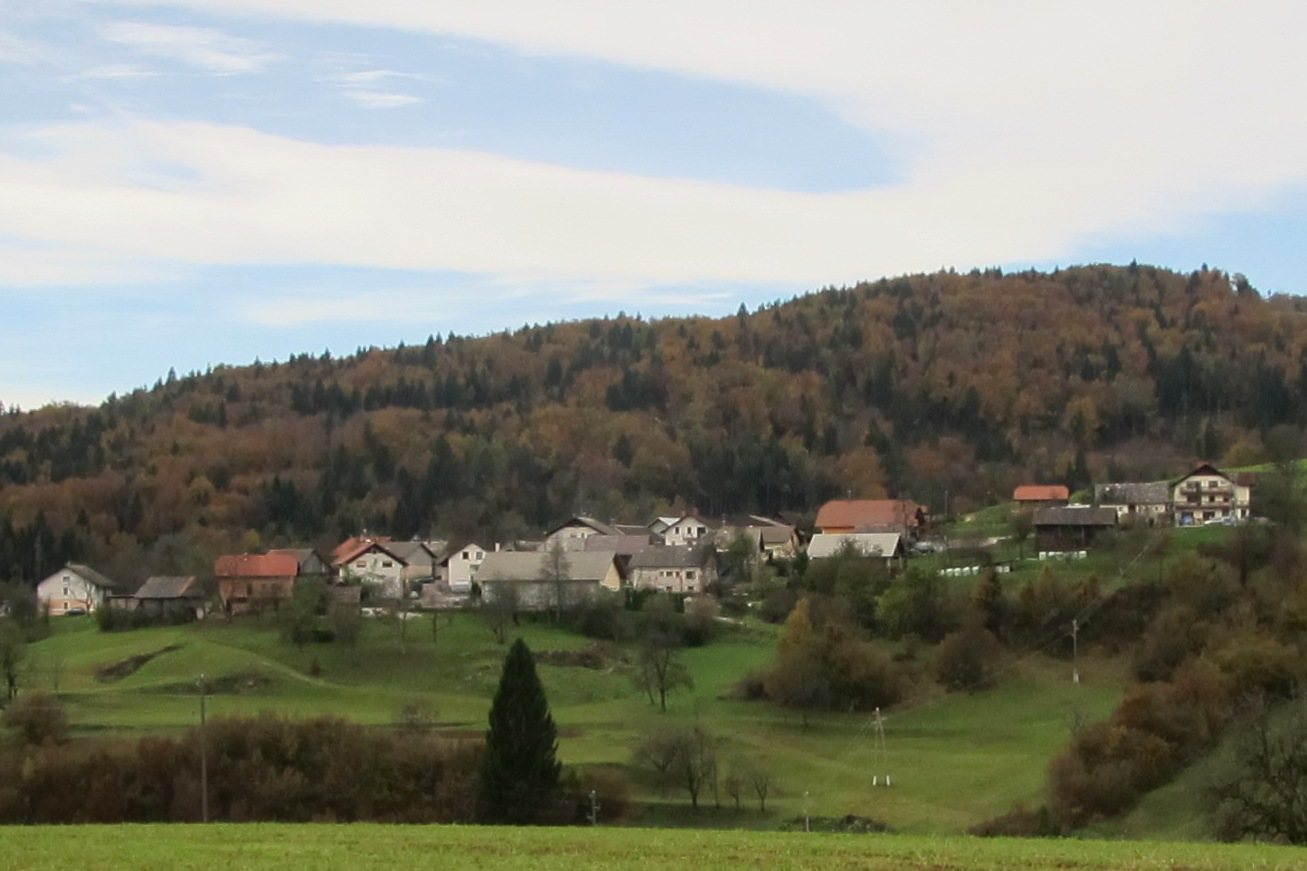

- Location in Slovenia
- Coordinates: 45°59′44.94″N 14°41′44.56″E
- Country: Slovenia
- Traditional region: Lower Carniola
- Statistical region: Central Slovenia
- Municipality: Grosuplje

Area
  - Total: 1.06 km^{2} (0.41 sq mi)
- Elevation: 453.4 m (1,488 ft)

Population (2002)
  - Total: 69

Dolenja Vas pri Polici (pronounced [dɔˈleːnja ˈʋaːs pɾi pɔˈliːtsi]; Slovene: Dolenja vas pri Polici, German: Niederdorf) is a small settlement north of Polica in the Municipality of Grosuplje in central Slovenia. The area is part of the historical region of Lower Carniola. The municipality is now included in the Central Slovenia Statistical Region.

== Name ==
The name of the settlement was changed from Dolenja vas to Dolenja vas pri Polici in 1953. In the past the German name was Niederdorf.

== Cultural heritage ==
A small roadside chapel-shrine south of the village dates to 1875.
