= Vinkov Vrh =

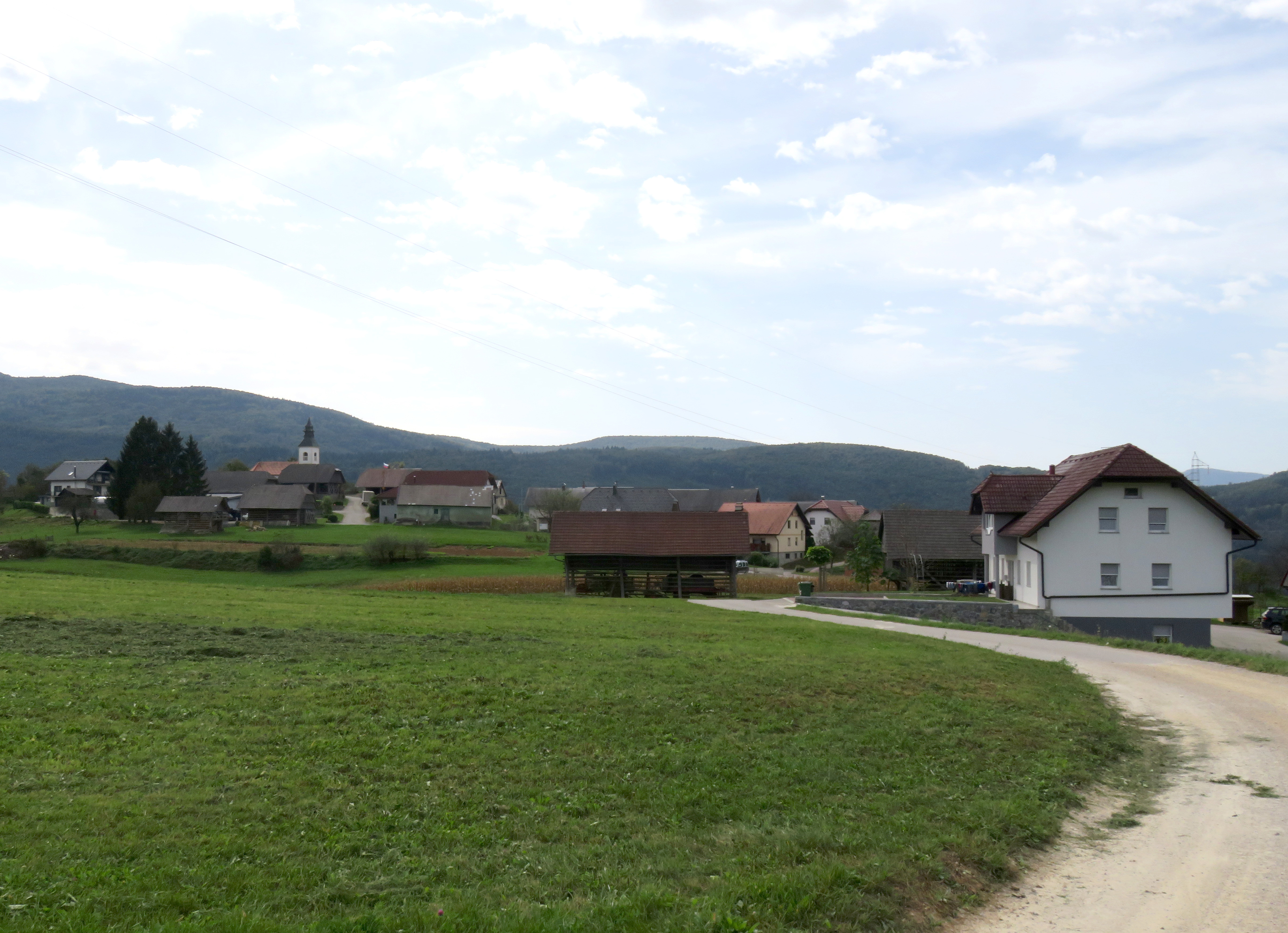

- Location in Slovenia
- Coordinates: 45°48′22.57″N 14°58′33.34″E
- Country: Slovenia
- Traditional region: Lower Carniola
- Statistical region: Southeast Slovenia
- Municipality: Žužemberk

Area
  - Total: 1.5 km^{2} (0.58 sq mi)
- Elevation: 319.6 m (1,049 ft)

Population (2002)
  - Total: 43

Vinkov Vrh (pronounced [ˈʋiːnkɔu̯ ˈʋərx], German: Adamsberg) is a village in the Municipality of Žužemberk in southeastern Slovenia. The area is part of the historical region of Lower Carniola. The municipality is now included in the Southeast Slovenia Statistical Region.

== Geography ==
Vinkov Vrh is a clustered settlement on the sunny side of Primovje (or Brinovje) Hill (sometimes also known as Vinkov vrh), which rises to an elevation of 380 meters (1,250 ft). The settlement lies along the road from Dvor to Dolnji Ajdovec and includes the hamlet of Skopice to the northeast.

== Church ==
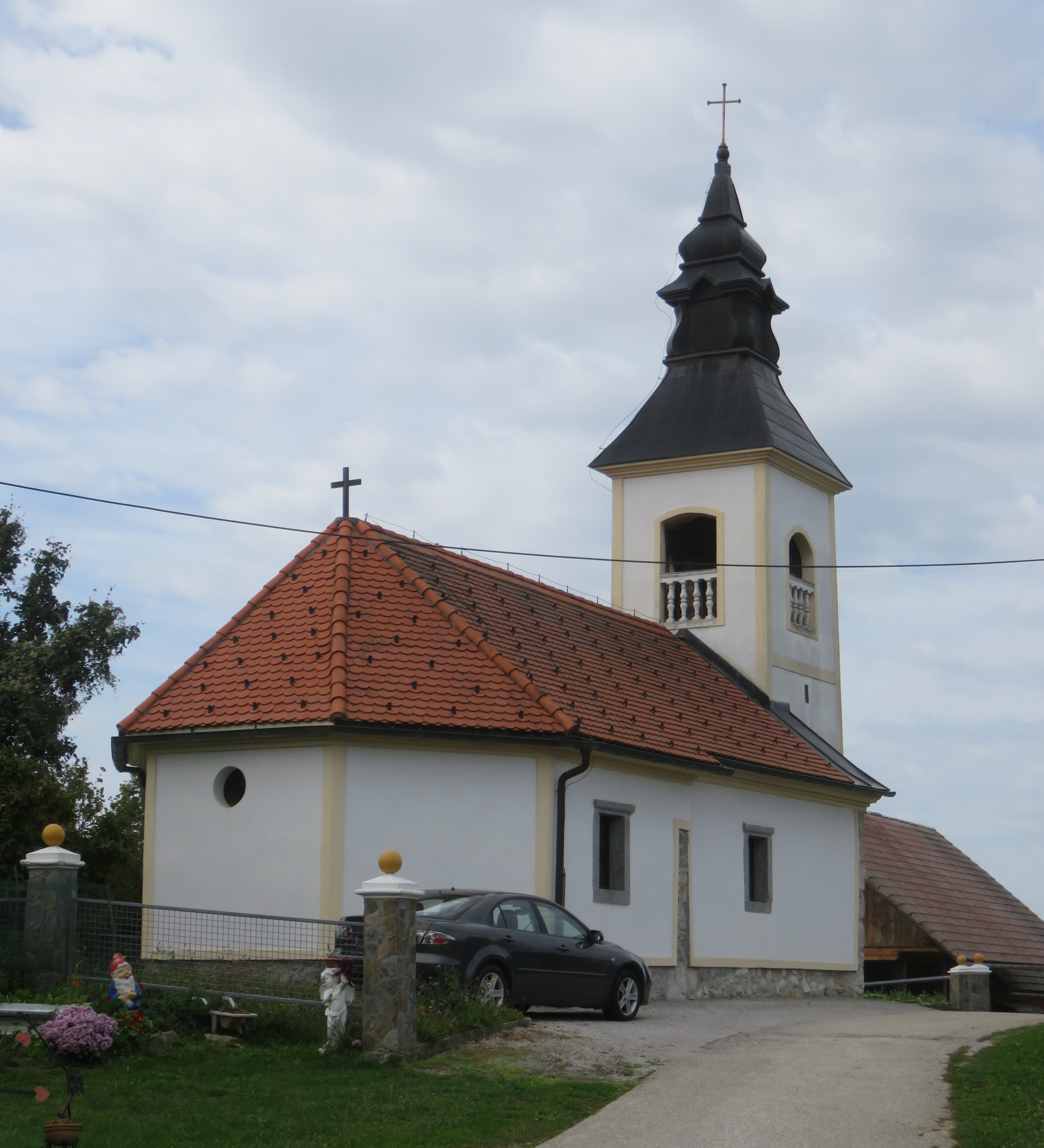
Saint Paul's Church

The local church is dedicated to Saint Paul and belongs to the Parish of Žužemberk. It is a medieval building that was restyled in the Baroque style in the 17th century and was badly damaged in the Second World War and left in ruins. The church was restored and reconstructed in 2000.
