= Mali Konec =

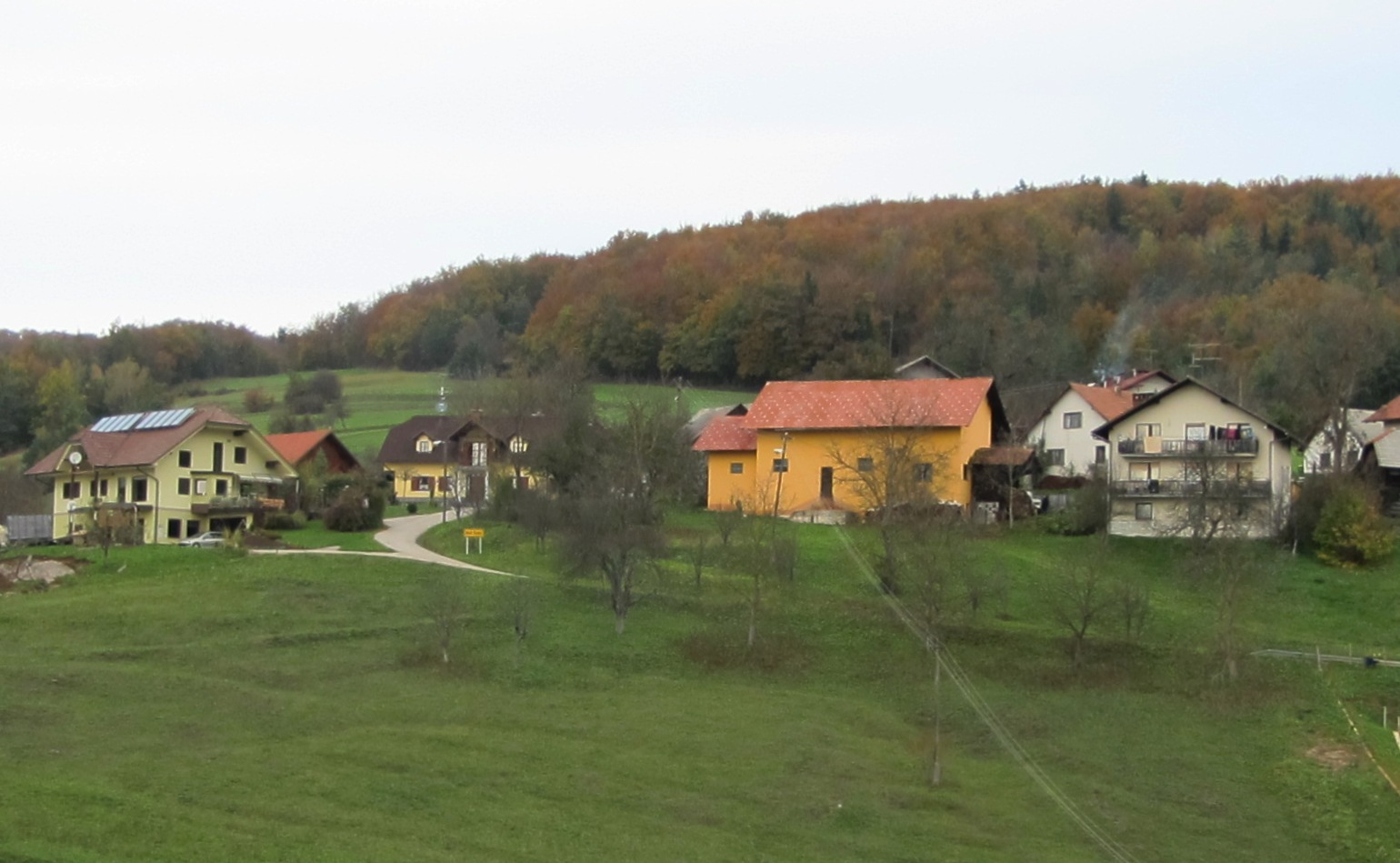
- Mali Konec

- Location in Slovenia
- Coordinates: 46°0′1.19″N 14°42′5.38″E
- Country: Slovenia
- Traditional region: Lower Carniola
- Statistical region: Central Slovenia
- Municipality: Grosuplje

Area
  - Total: 1.4 km^{2} (0.54 sq mi)
- Elevation: 465.4 m (1,527 ft)

Population (2002)
  - Total: 25

Mali Konec (pronounced [ˈmaːli ˈkɔːnəts]) is a small settlement in the hills north of Polica in the Municipality of Grosuplje in central Slovenia. The area is part of the historical region of Lower Carniola. The municipality is now included in the Central Slovenia Statistical Region.

Evidence of an Iron Age hillfort has been found on Križatec Hill north of the settlement. The fortification had a rectangular layout and its embankments are still partially preserved.
