= Kamni Vrh pri Ambrusu =

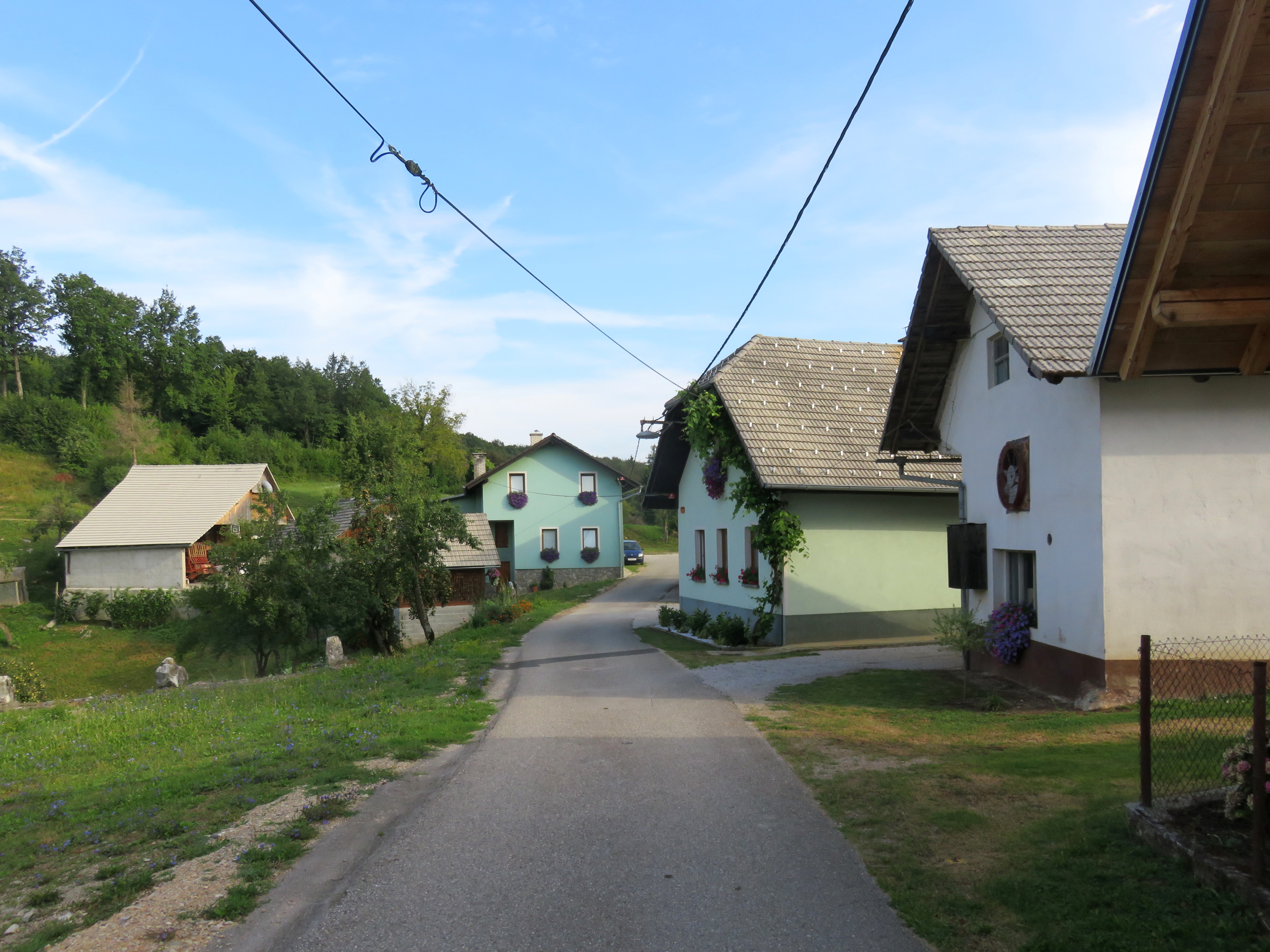

- Location in Slovenia
- Coordinates: 45°50′10.29″N 14°49′26″E
- Country: Slovenia
- Traditional region: Lower Carniola
- Statistical region: Central Slovenia
- Municipality: Ivančna Gorica

Area
  - Total: 2.87 km^{2} (1.11 sq mi)
- Elevation: 471.2 m (1,546 ft)

Population (2002)
  - Total: 40

Kamni Vrh pri Ambrusu (pronounced [ˈkaːmni ˈʋəɾx pɾi amˈbɾuːsu]) is a small settlement on a hill north of Ambrus in the Municipality of Ivančna Gorica in central Slovenia. The area is part of the historical region of Lower Carniola. The municipality is now included in the Central Slovenia Statistical Region.

== Church ==
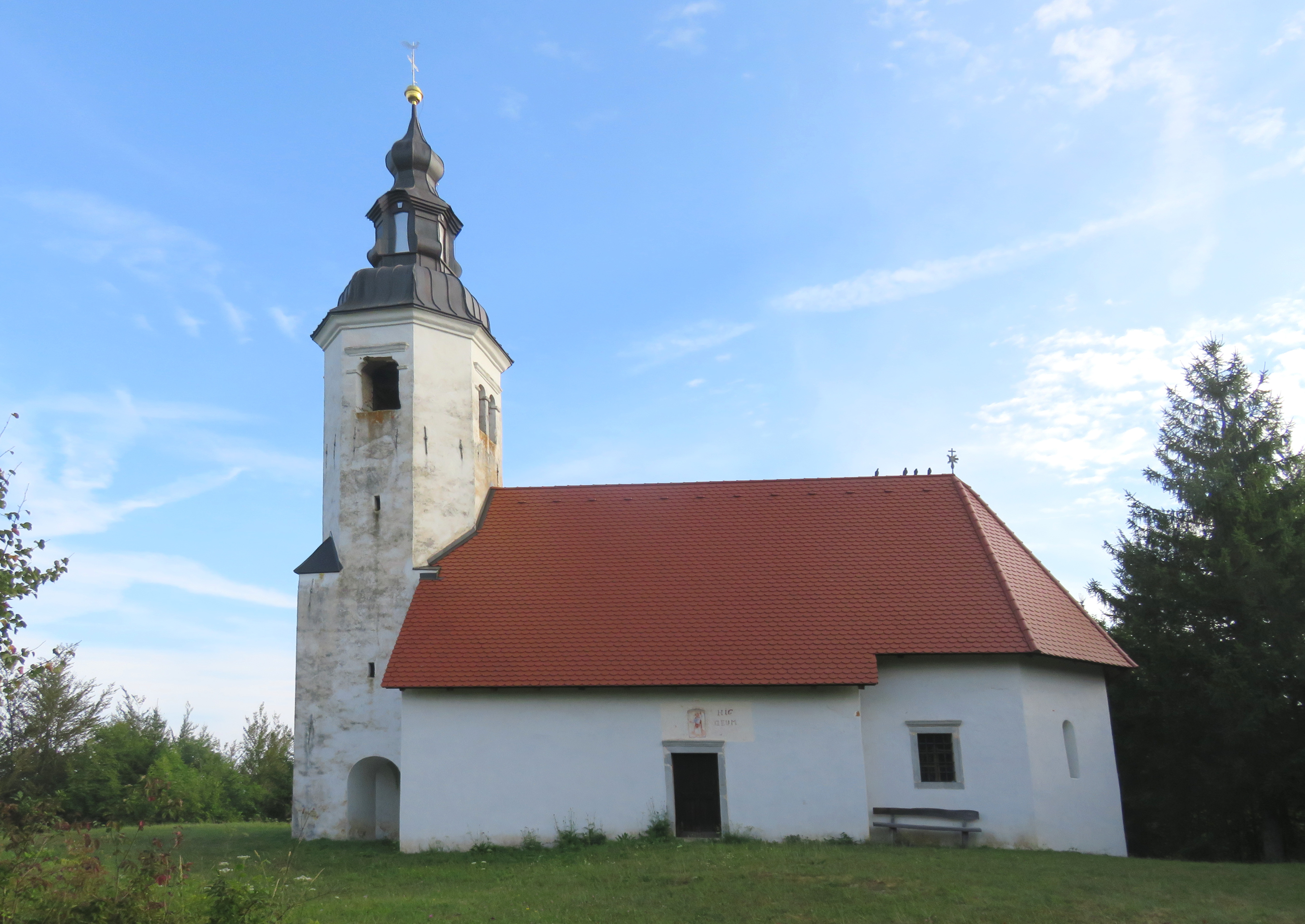
Saint Peter's Church

The local church, built on the hill known as Stražarjev vrh north of the settlement, is dedicated to Saint Peter and belongs to the Parish of Ambrus. It dates to the mid-15th century.
