= Podlipa, Žužemberk =

Podlipa
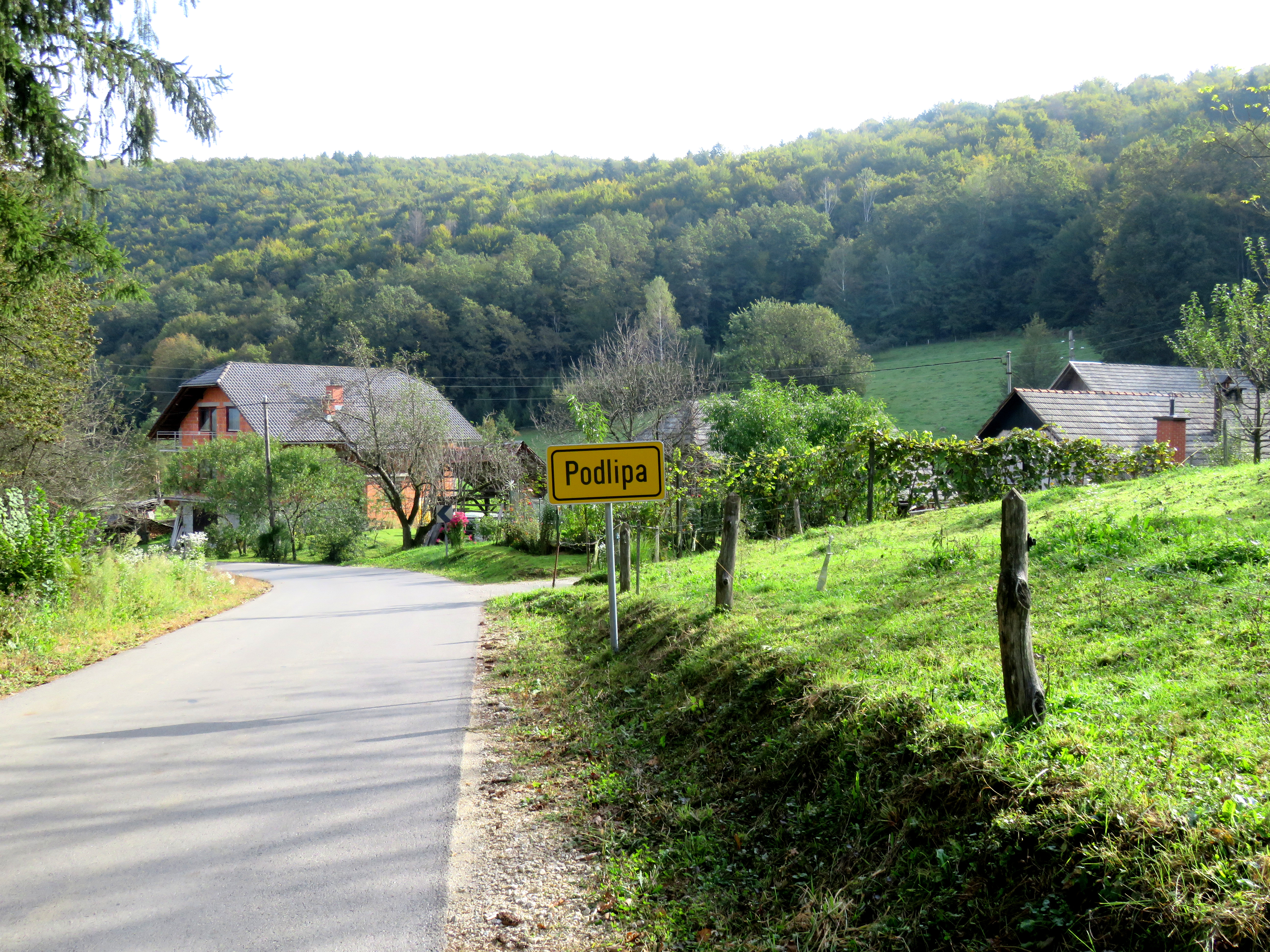

- Location in Slovenia
- Coordinates: 45°50′28.91″N 14°59′58.11″E
- Country: Slovenia
- Traditional region: Lower Carniola
- Statistical region: Southeast Slovenia
- Municipality: Žužemberk

Area
  - Total: 3.1 km^{2} (1.2 sq mi)
- Elevation: 242 m (794 ft)

Population (2002)
  - Total: 44

Podlipa (pronounced [pɔˈdliːpa]) is a small village in the hills north of Dvor in the Municipality of Žužemberk in southeastern Slovenia. The municipality is included in the Southeast Slovenia Statistical Region and the wider area is part of the historical region of Lower Carniola.

== Name ==
The name of the settlement was recorded as Tylia in 1318, Linden in 1398, and Pod lippo in 1507.
