= Dolnji Ajdovec =

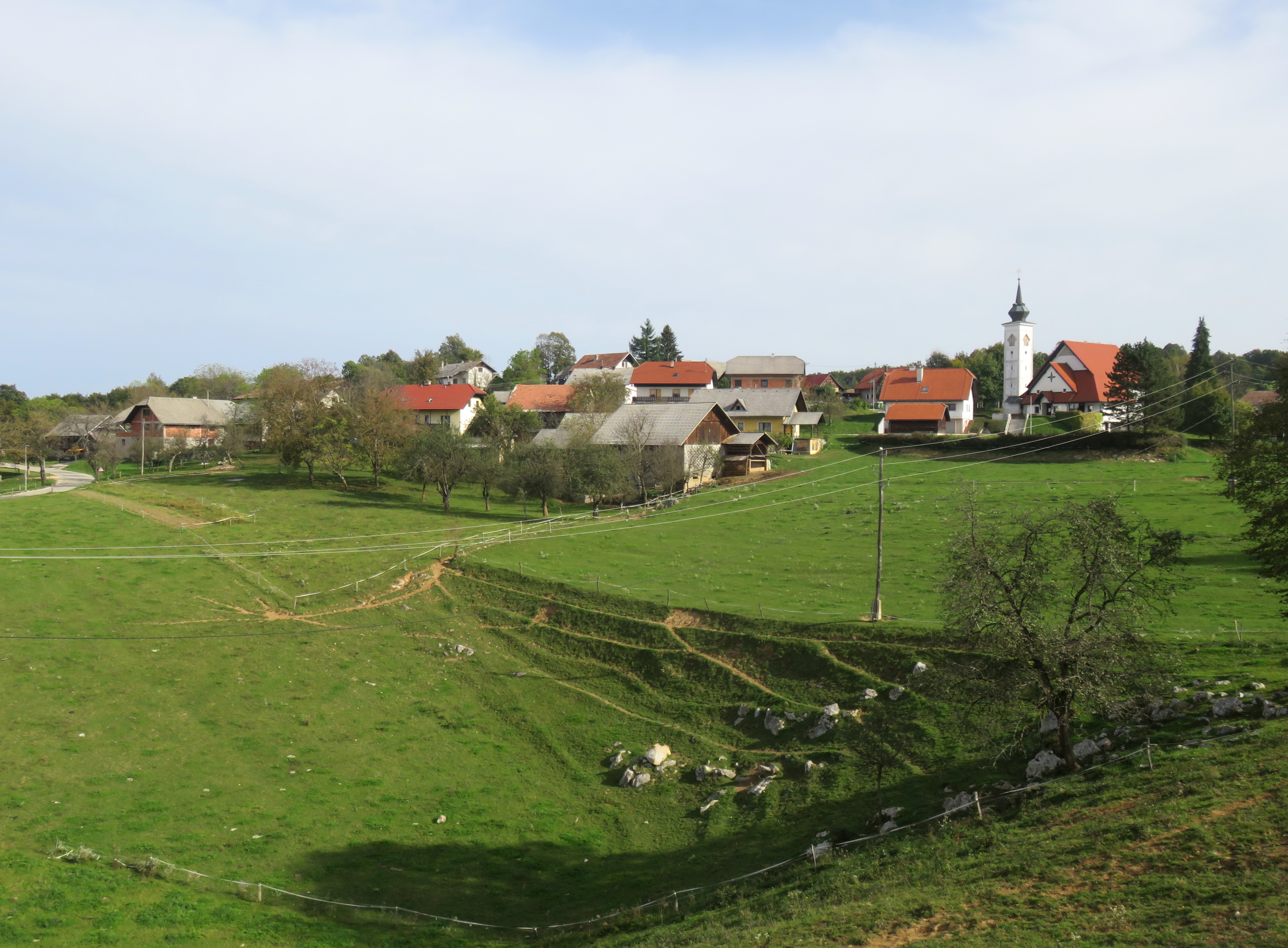

- Location in Slovenia
- Coordinates: 45°49′44.85″N 15°0′43.98″E
- Country: Slovenia
- Traditional region: Lower Carniola
- Statistical region: Southeast Slovenia
- Municipality: Žužemberk

Area
  - Total: 5.12 km^{2} (1.98 sq mi)
- Elevation: 435.4 m (1,428 ft)

Population (2002)
  - Total: 63

Dolnji Ajdovec (pronounced [ˈdoːlnji ˈaːi̯dɔʋəts], in older sources Dolenja Ajdovica, German: Unterhaidowitz) is a village in the Municipality of Žužemberk in southeastern Slovenia. The area is part of the historical region of Lower Carniola. The municipality is now included in the Southeast Slovenia Statistical Region.

== Church ==
The local parish church is dedicated to the Holy Trinity (Slovene: Sveta Trojica) and belongs to the Roman Catholic Diocese of Novo Mesto. It was built in the 1990s.
