= Metnaj =

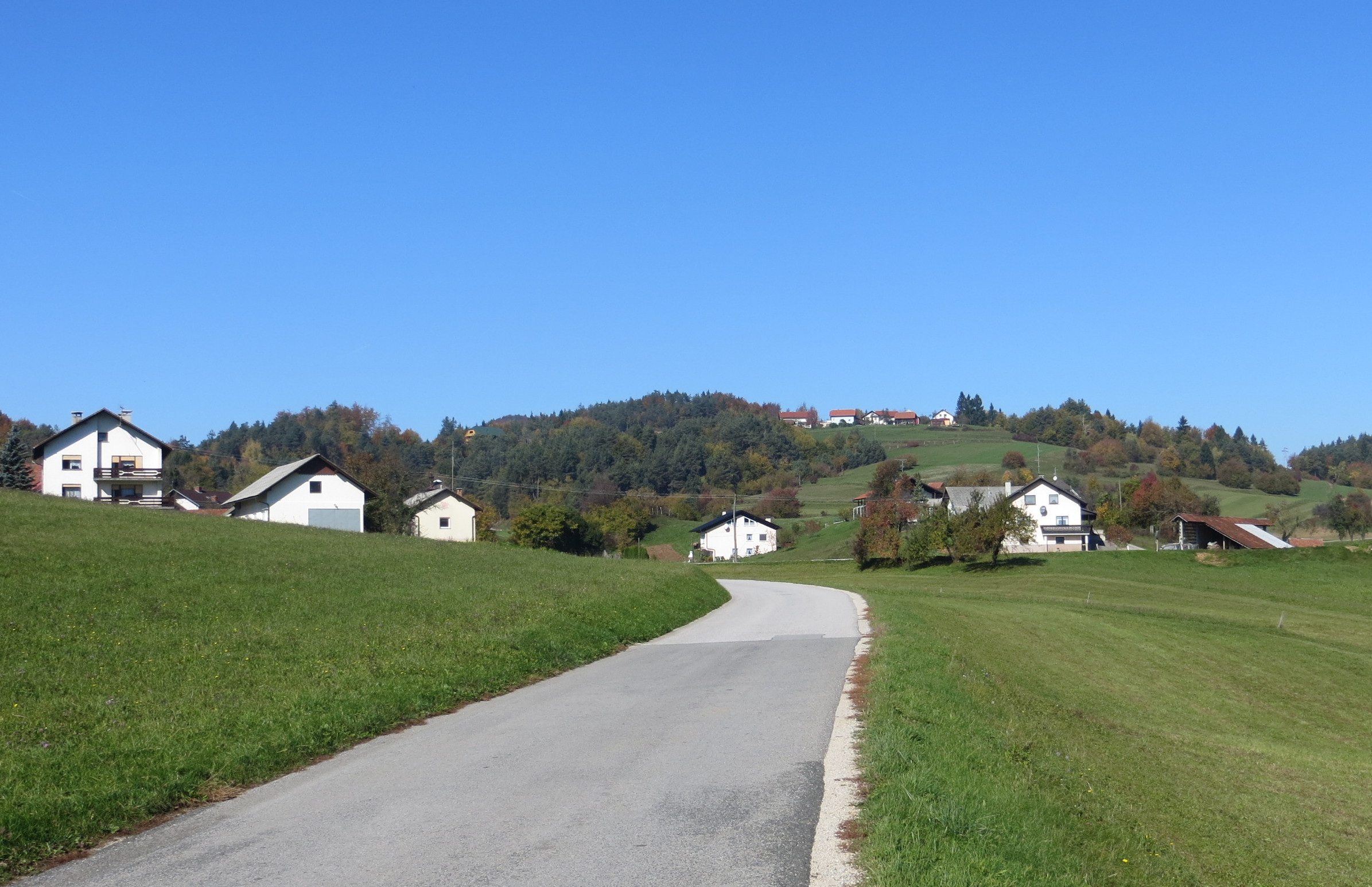

- Location in Slovenia
- Coordinates: 45°58′47.49″N 14°48′19.33″E
- Country: Slovenia
- Traditional region: Lower Carniola
- Statistical region: Central Slovenia
- Municipality: Ivančna Gorica

Area
  - Total: 2.85 km^{2} (1.10 sq mi)
- Elevation: 545.8 m (1,791 ft)

Population (2002)
  - Total: 104

Metnaj (pronounced [ˈmɛːtnaj]; German: Metnai) is a village in the hills north of Stična in the Municipality of Ivančna Gorica in central Slovenia. The area is part of the historical region of Lower Carniola. The municipality is now included in the Central Slovenia Statistical Region.

== Church ==
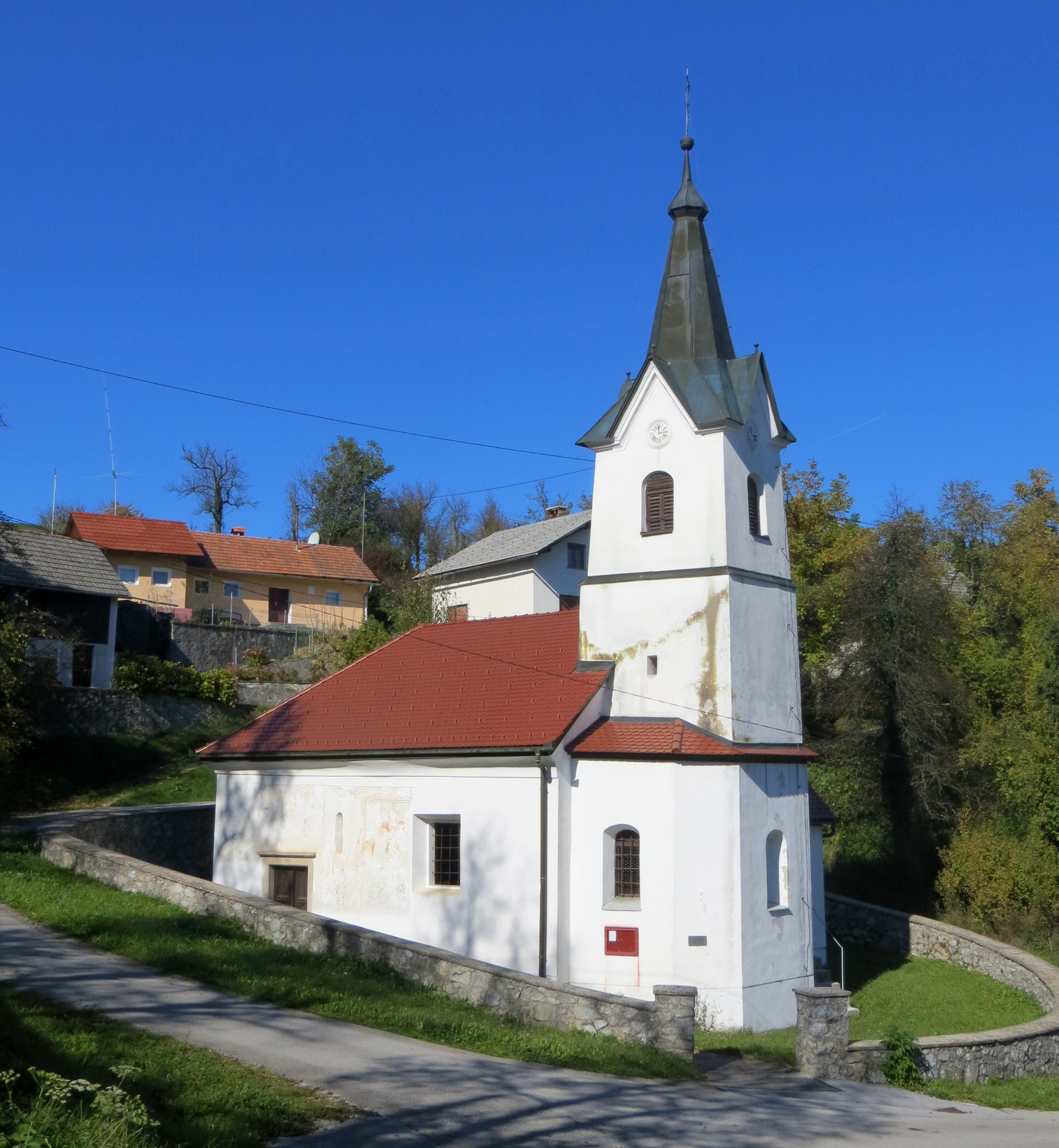
View from south

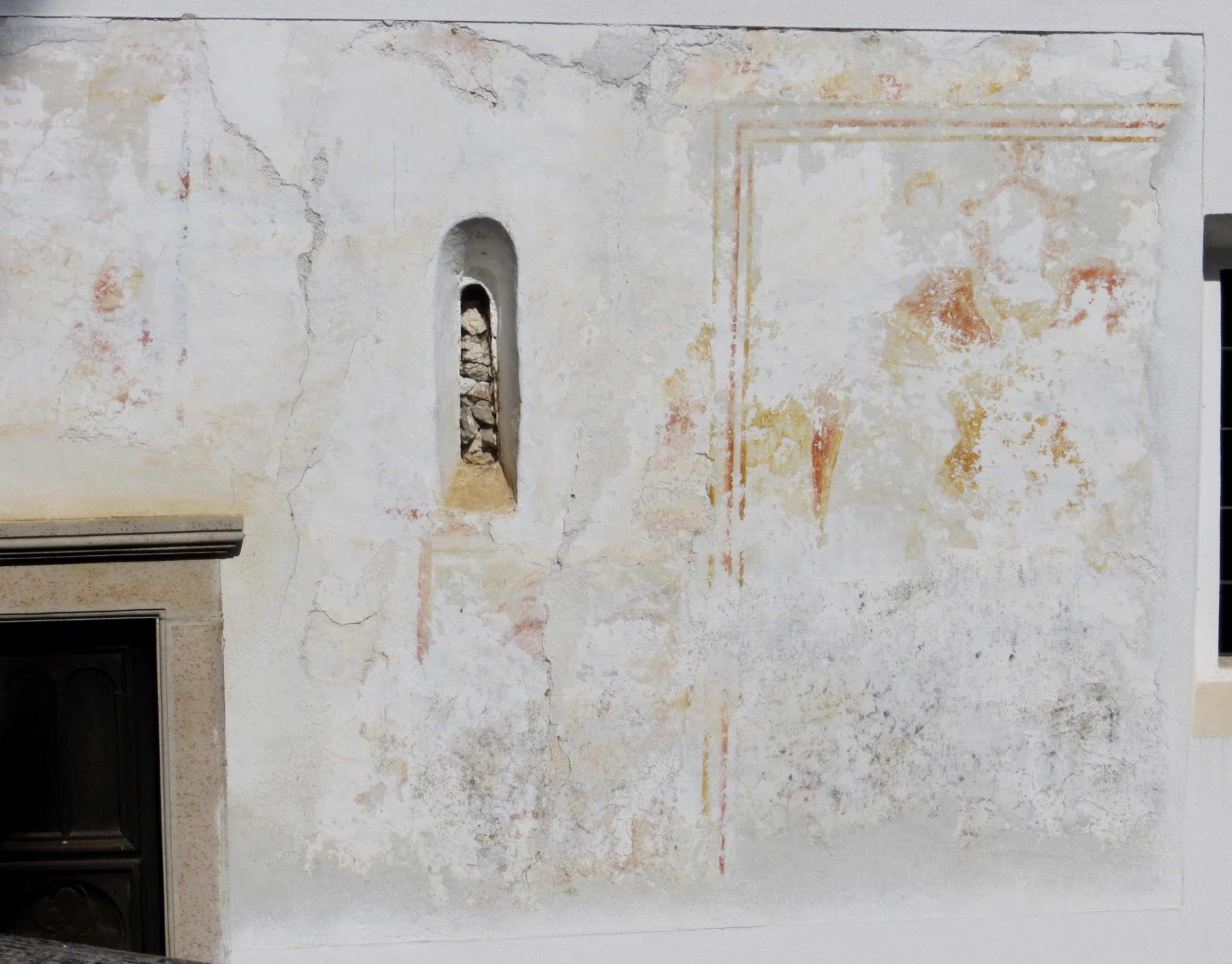
Exterior fresco remnants

Mary Magdalene Church

The local church is dedicated to Mary Magdalene and belongs to the Parish of Stična. It was originally a Romanesque building that was extensively remodelled in the 17th and 19th centuries.
