= Mačkovec pri Dvoru =

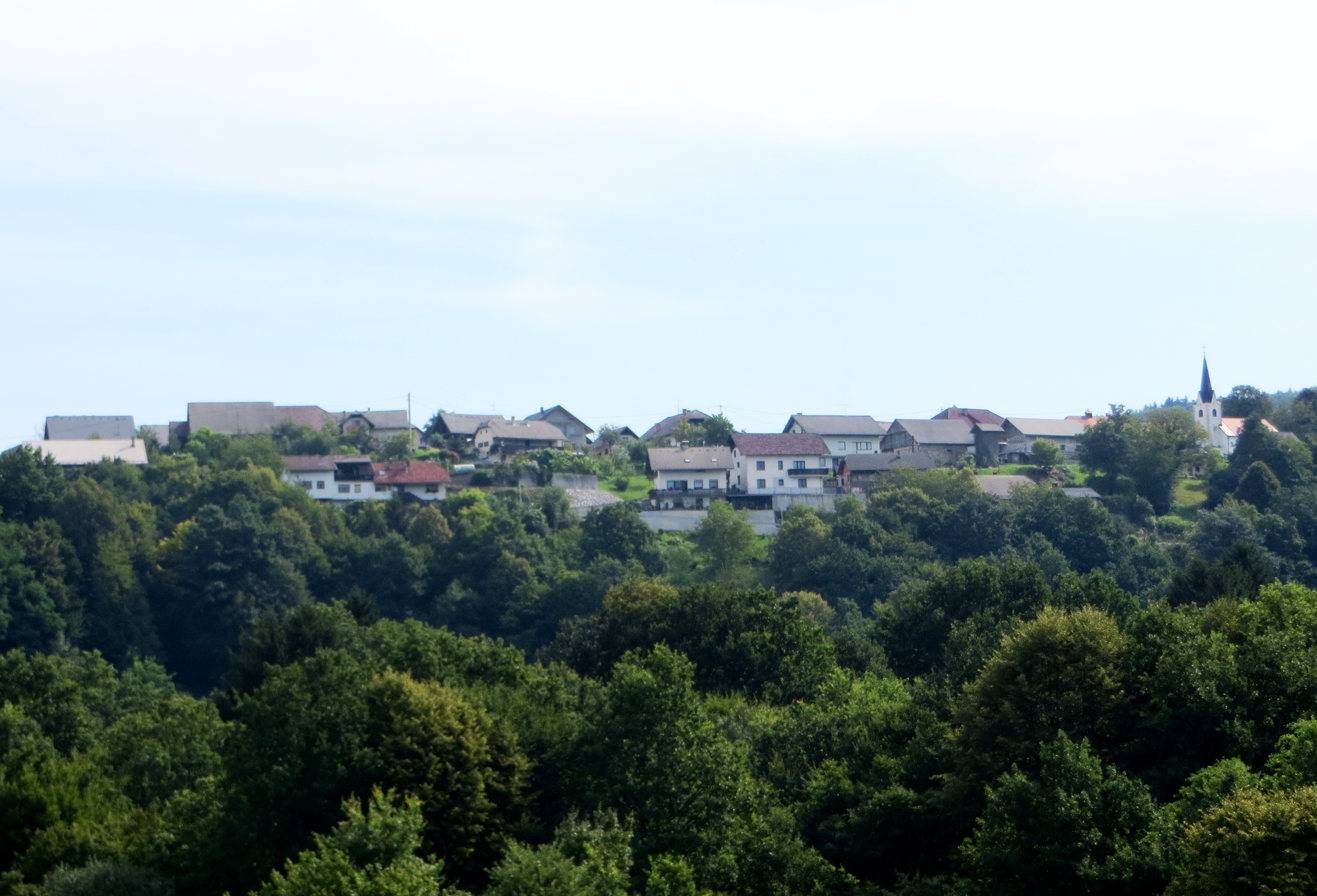

- Location in Slovenia
- Coordinates: 45°48′58.19″N 14°57′45.15″E
- Country: Slovenia
- Traditional region: Lower Carniola
- Statistical region: Southeast Slovenia
- Municipality: Žužemberk

Area
  - Total: 2.19 km^{2} (0.85 sq mi)
- Elevation: 246.5 m (809 ft)

Population (2002)
  - Total: 103

Mačkovec pri Dvoru (pronounced [matʃˈkɔːʋəts pɾi ˈdʋɔːɾu] or [matʃˈkoːʋəts pɾi ˈdʋɔːɾu], German: Katzendorf) is a village in the Municipality of Žužemberk in southeastern Slovenia. It lies on the left bank of the Krka River just north of Dvor. The area is part of the historical region of Lower Carniola. The municipality is now included in the Southeast Slovenia Statistical Region. The settlement includes the formerly independent village of Brod (German: Überfuhr).

== Name ==
Mačkovec pri Dvoru was attested in written sources as Chachendorf in 1317, Maczkowicz in 1350, and Kazendorff in 1398, among other spellings. The name of the settlement was changed from Mačkovec to Mačkovec pri Dvoru in 1953.

== Church ==
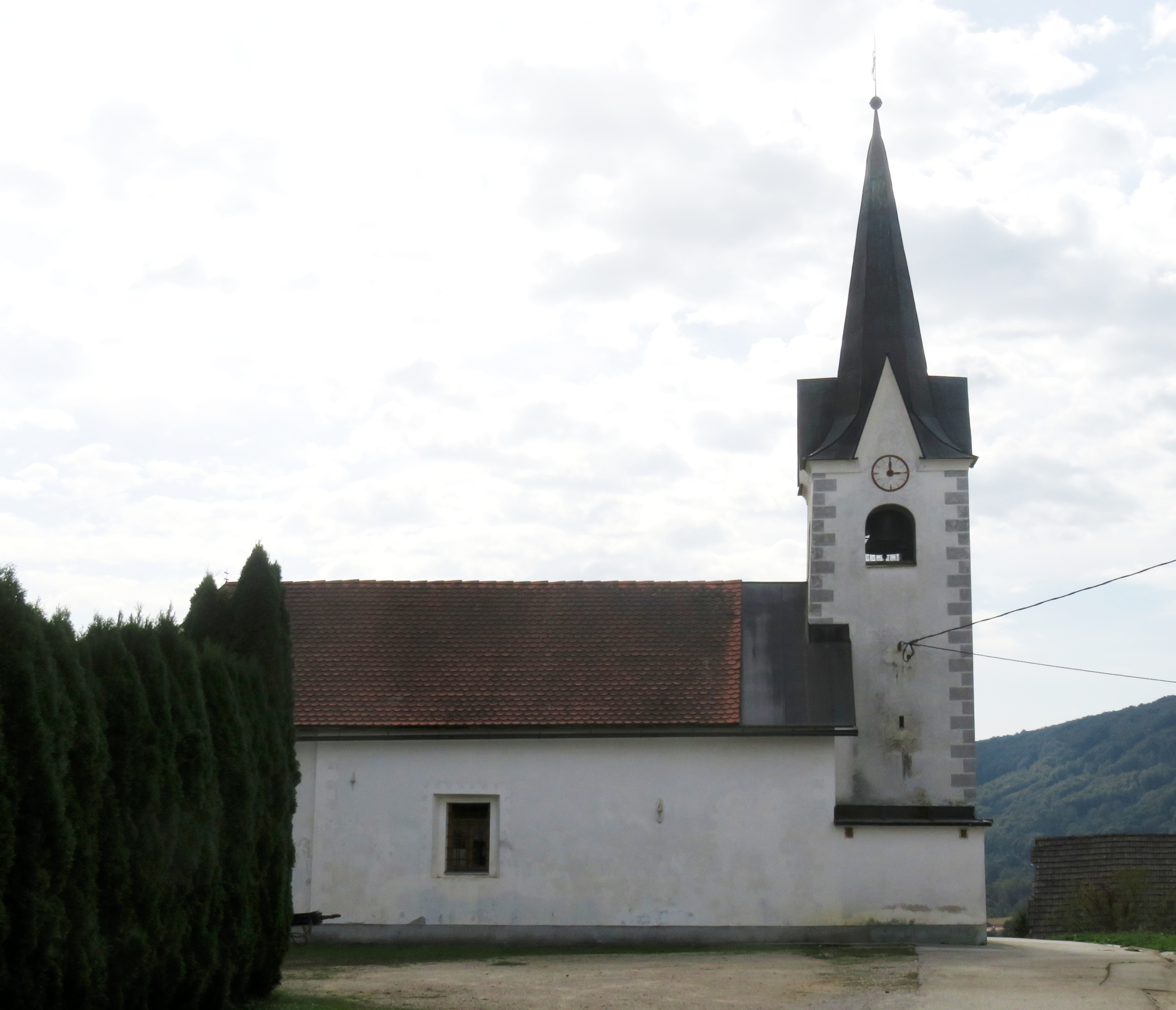
Saint John the Evangelist Church

The local church is dedicated to Saint John the Evangelist and belongs to the Parish of Žužemberk. It is a medieval building that was restyled in the Baroque style in the 18th century.
