= Polica, Grosuplje =

Settlement in Lower Carniola, Slovenia

Polica
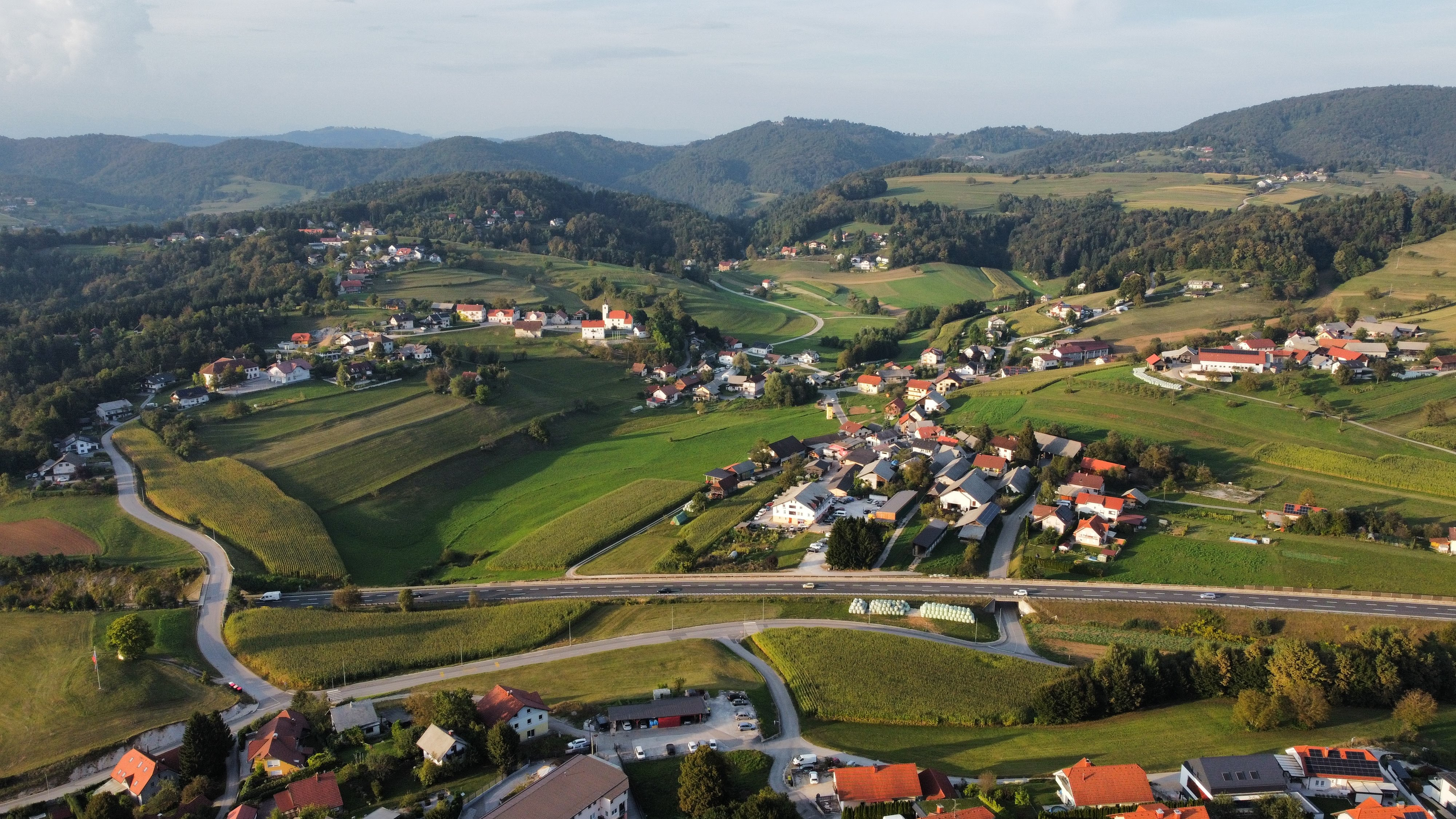
- Polica

- Location in Slovenia
- Coordinates: 45°58′44.14″N 14°42′21.59″E
- Country: Slovenia
- Traditional region: Lower Carniola
- Statistical region: Central Slovenia
- Municipality: Grosuplje

Area
  - Total: 3.92 km^{2} (1.51 sq mi)
- Elevation: 453.9 m (1,489 ft)

Population (2002)
  - Total: 522

Polica (pronounced [pɔˈliːtsa]; German: Politz) is a settlement in the Municipality of Grosuplje in central Slovenia. The area is part of the historical region of Lower Carniola. The municipality is now included in the Central Slovenia Statistical Region.

== Geography ==
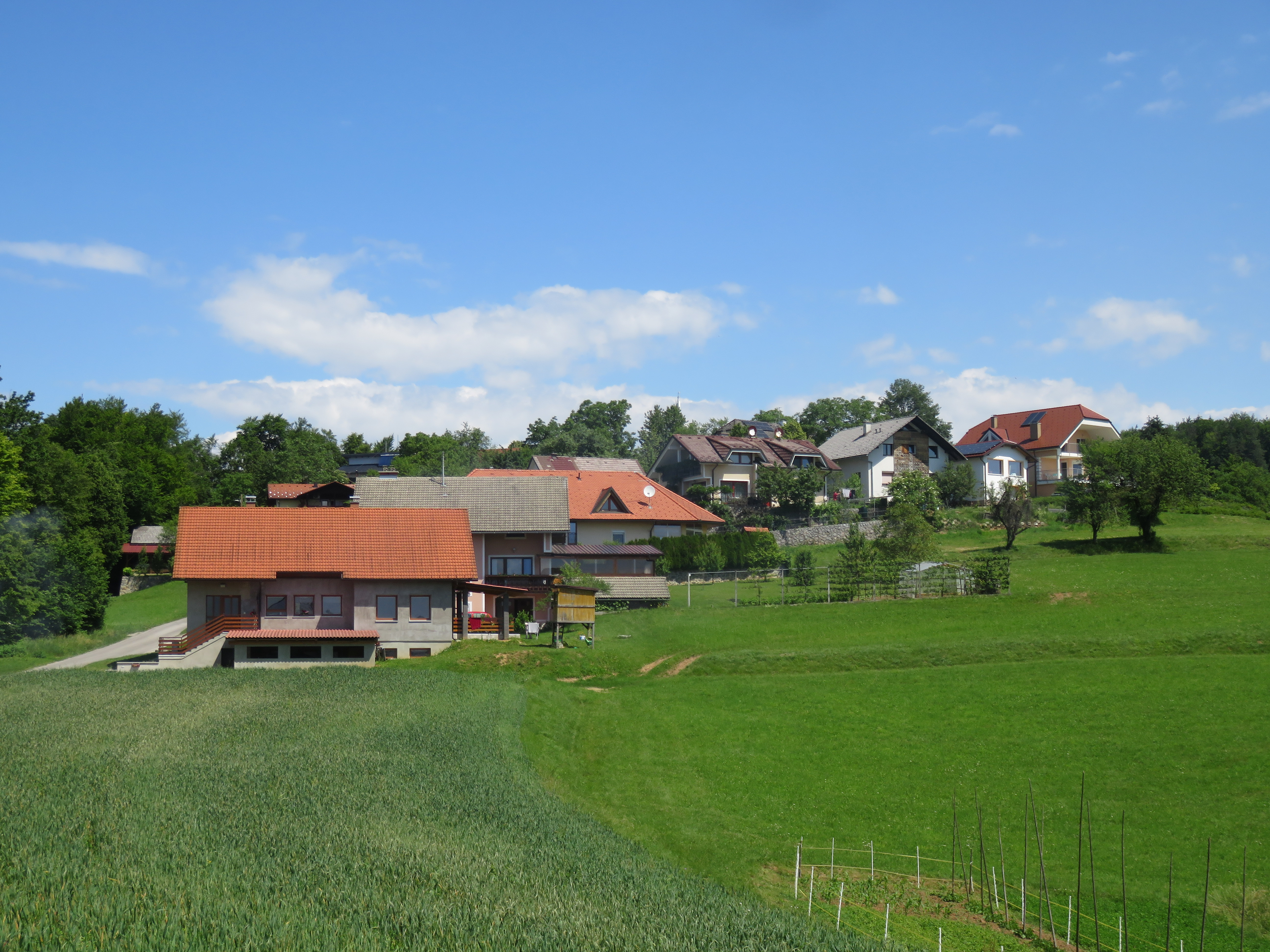
The hamlet of Bliska Vas

Polica includes the hamlets of Bliska Vas (Slovene: Bliska vas), Žabja Vas (Žabja vas), Hrib, and Goričane.

== Name ==
Polica was first attested in written sources in 1301 as Pöltz or Poliz (and as Politz in 1372 and Policz in 1475). The name is derived from the Slovene common noun polica 'terraced earth between two embankments', thus referring to the local geography. In the past the German name was Politz.

== History ==
A school was established in Polica in 1873. During the Second World War, a regional committee of the Liberation Front was established in the village on 6 January 1942. A shoe-making and tailoring workshop for the Partisans operated in the village. On 20 March 1943 the bodies of five murdered men, known as the Dobrunje and Bizovik victims, were discovered buried in Krčmar's Woods (Slovene: Krčmarjeva hosta) north of the hamlet of Bliska Vas. The Partisans burned the school building and rectory in Polica in 1944.

=== Mass graves ===
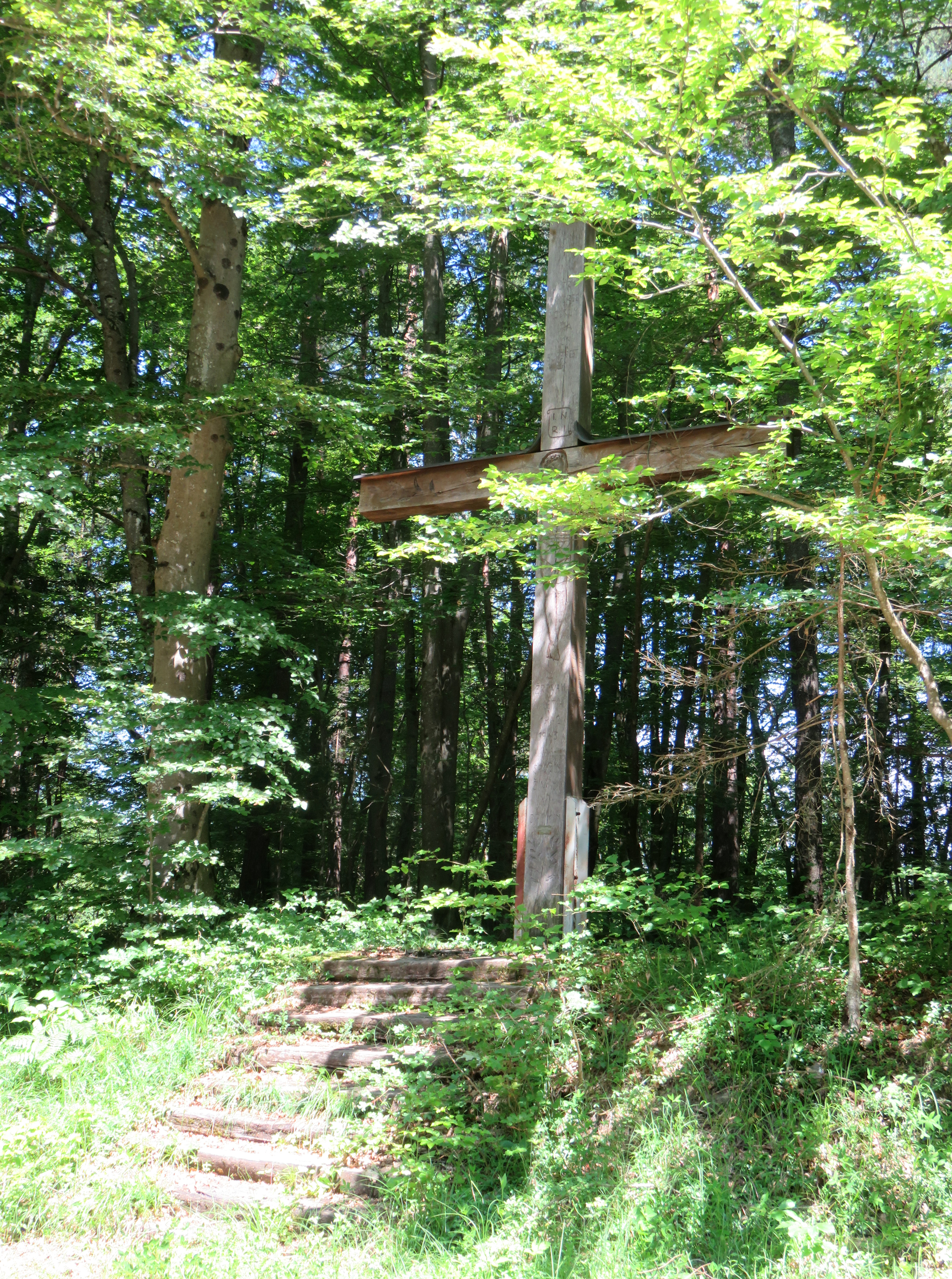
Marker at the Bliska Vas nad Polico Mass Grave

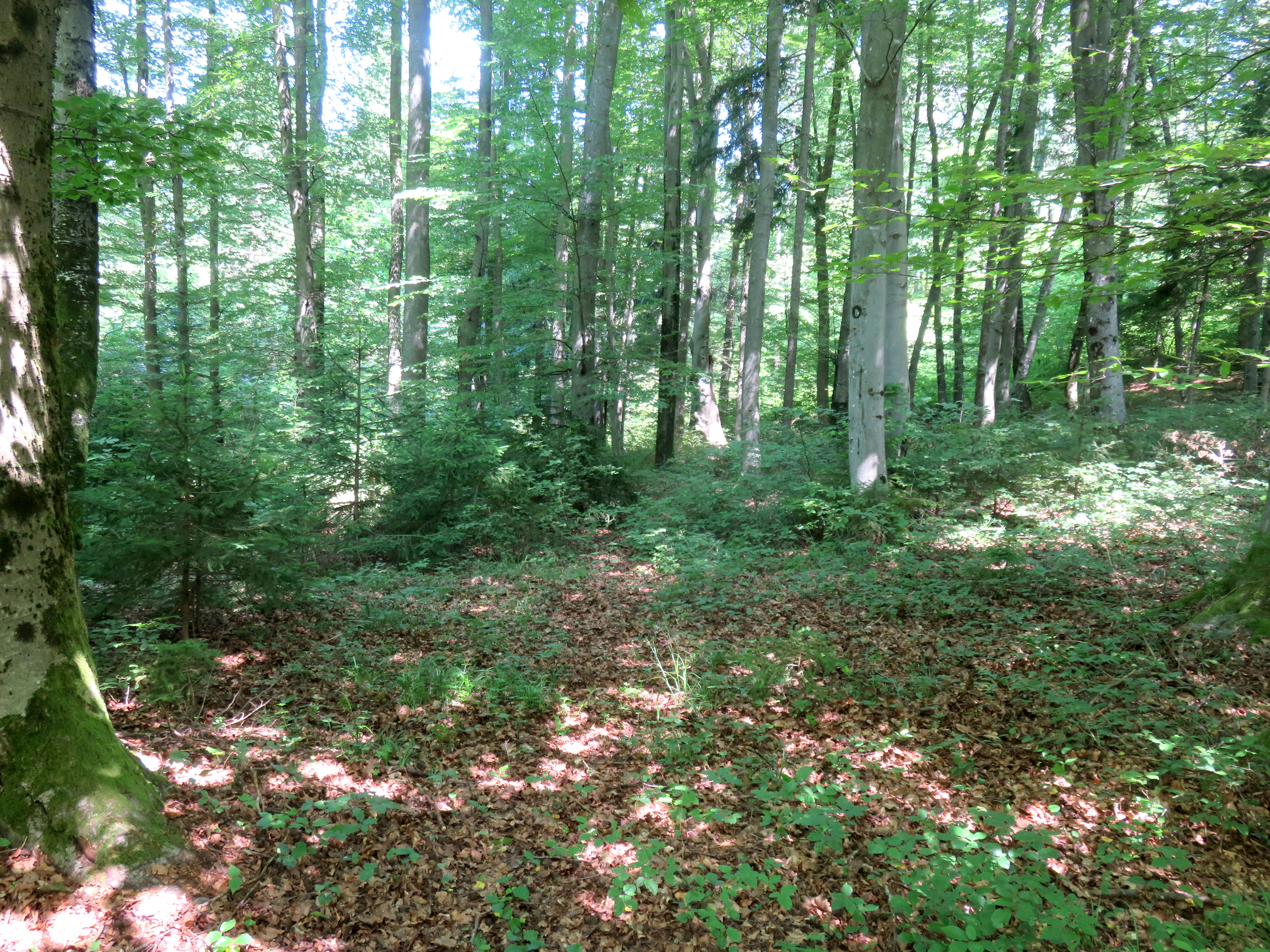
The Polica Mass Grave in the Bukovje Woods

Polica is the site of two known mass graves from the period immediately after the Second World War. The Bliska Vas nad Polico Mass Grave (Slovene: Grobišče Bliska vas nad Polico) lies on a wooded slope below a path from the hamlet of Bliska Vas to Andrejc Hill. It contains the remains of Slovene civilians from the area and from the Moste neighborhood of Ljubljana that were murdered in the vicinity of an encampment of the Partisan Lower Carniola Detachment. The Polica Mass Grave (Grobišče Polica) lies in the Bukovje Woods on the western slope of Vrh and Log hills, north of the hamlet of Bliska Vas, near the former encampment of the 2nd Unit of the Partisan Lower Carniola Detachment. It contains the remains of over 20 Slovene civilians from Ljubljana that were accused of espionage and liquidated.

== Church ==
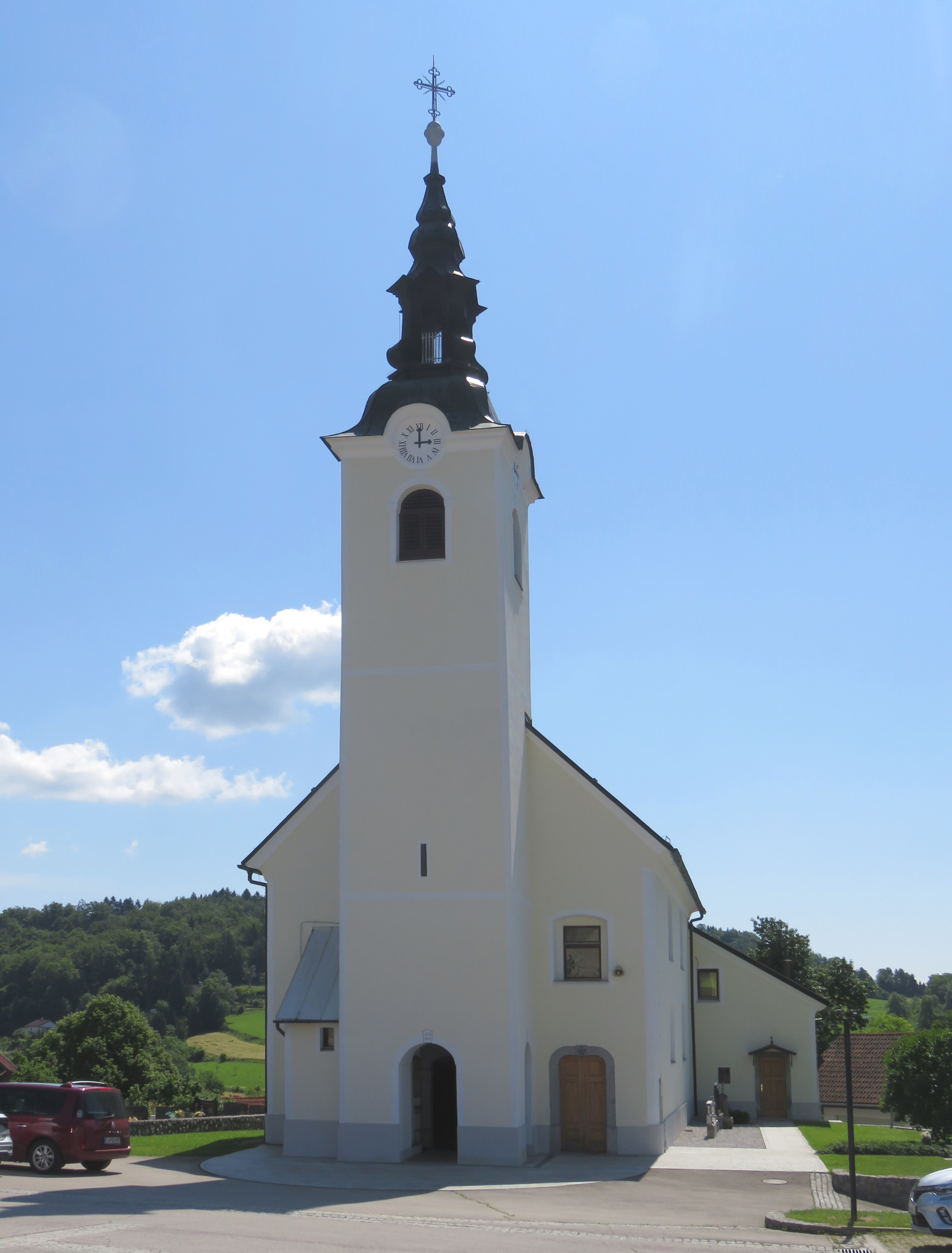
Saint James's Church

The parish church in the village is dedicated to Saint James (Slovene: sveti Jakob) and belongs to the Roman Catholic Archdiocese of Ljubljana. It is a 14th-century Gothic building that was restyled and rebuilt in 1797. The church stands in the hamlet of Hrib and was first mentioned in written sources in 1372. The furnishings of the church mainly date from the 19th century.

== Notable people ==
Notable people that were born or lived in Polica include:

- Louis Šeme (born Alojzij Šeme) (1901–1983), musician active in Cleveland
