= Lobček =

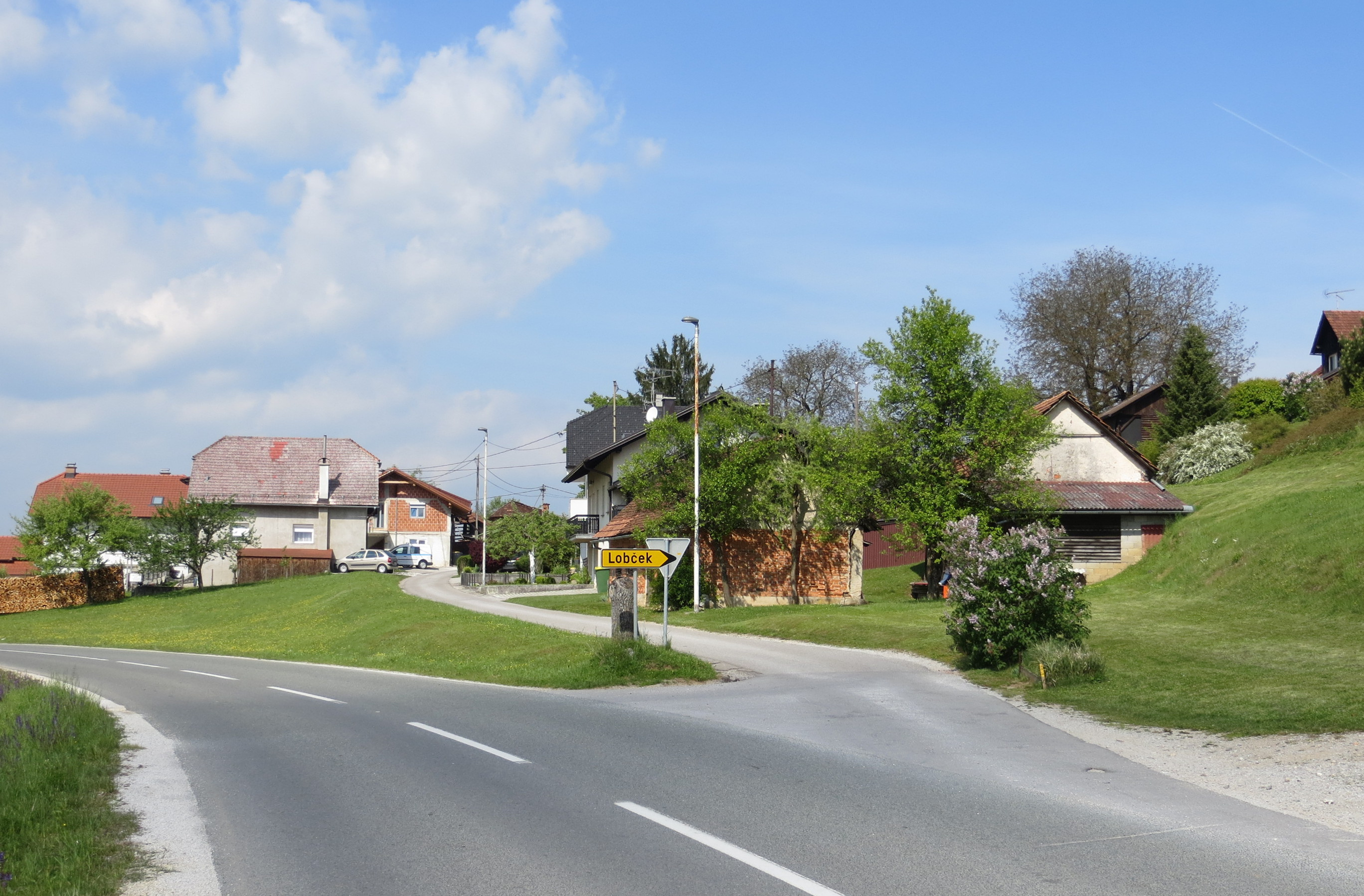

- Location in Slovenia
- Coordinates: 45°56′2.34″N 14°41′18.38″E
- Country: Slovenia
- Traditional region: Lower Carniola
- Statistical region: Central Slovenia
- Municipality: Grosuplje

Area
  - Total: 0.4 km^{2} (0.15 sq mi)
- Elevation: 374.4 m (1,228 ft)

Population (2002)
  - Total: 131

Lobček (pronounced [ˈloːptʃək]) is a settlement southeast of Grosuplje, in central Slovenia. The Municipality of Grosuplje is part of the historical region of Lower Carniola and is now included in the Central Slovenia Statistical Region.

== History ==
Lobček was formerly a hamlet divided between Veliko Mlačevo, Zagradec pri Grosupljem, and Žalna. It was formally separated from these settlements in 1983 and made an independent settlement.
