= Račna Karst Field =

Coordinates: 45°54′50″N 14°41′9″E

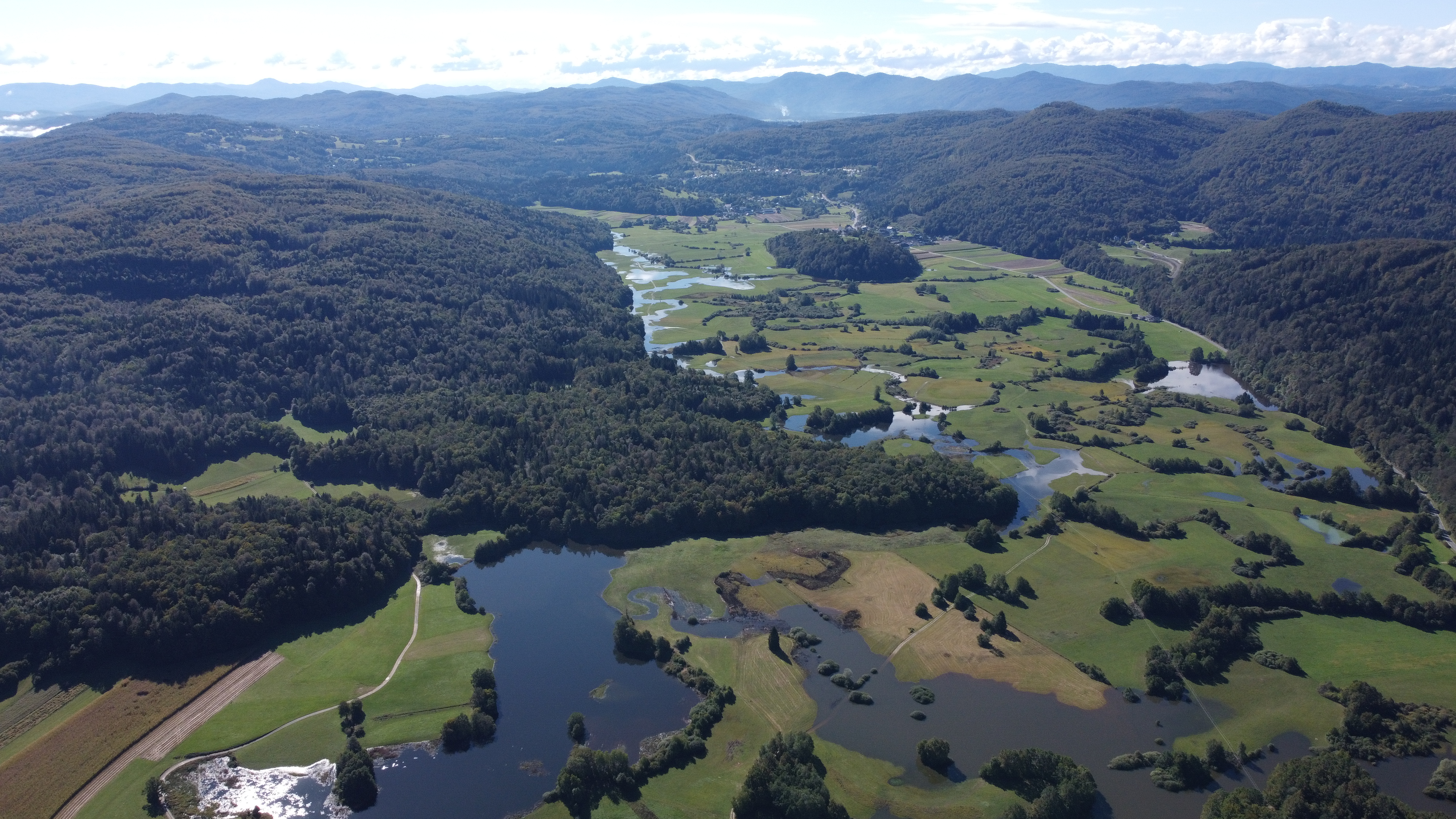
View of the Račna Karst Field, with isolated Kopanj Hill in the center and three rivers flowing across the field

The Račna Karst Field (pronounced [ˈɾaːtʃna]; Slovene: Radensko polje) is a karst field in the northern edge of the Lower Carniolan karst area, south of Grosuplje, Slovenia. It has rich natural and cultural value. Because of its ecological significance, it is anticipated that a nature park will be established there and that it will be included in the Natura 2000 program.

== Name ==
The Račna Karst Field is named after the settlements of Velika Račna and Mala Račna. The local adjective form radenski (as well as the demonym Radenc) is based on the older form of the settlements' name.

== Research ==
Researchers started studying the Račna Karst Field during construction of the railroad to Kočevje in 1893. During this period, several karst caves in the Ribnica–Kočevje karst region were discovered and explored. One of the pioneers of such research was Pavel Kunaver, who wrote about the area in 1922, as well as the photographers Bogumil Brinšek, Josip Kunaver, and Ivan Tavčar. The geographers Drago Meze and Ivan Gams wrote more detailed studies of the area in 1977 and 1986. The botanical features of the karst field were explored by Luka Pintar in 1991. The last major study was carried out in 2000 by the Fauna and Flora Cartography Center (Slovene: Center za kartografijo favne in flore), commissioned by the local municipality.

== Geography ==
The Račna Karst Field lies in an area with Dinaric-oriented ridges; it is approximately 4 kilometers (2.5 mi) long and 1 kilometer (0.62 mi) wide, and has a total area of 4 square kilometers (1.5 sq mi). It lies at an elevation of 325 meters (1,066 ft).

The karst field has a bowl-like shape with a level floor and a distinctly higher margin, and water enters it from the karst underground. Many other karst features are present in the karst field, such as springs, sinkholes, and estavelles. The karst field has three different watercourses; the Dobravka River flows from a non-karst area, whereas Zelenka Creek and Šica Creek are true karst streams. Kopanj Hill, an isolated dolomite hill 70 meters (230 ft) high, rises in the middle of the karst field and is a unique example of such a feature in a Slovene karst area. The floor of the karst field is covered in alluvial clay 5 meters (16 ft) to 10 meters (33 ft) deep, deposited on relatively pure Jurassic limestone. Only a few patches of the surface are composed of Triassic dolomite, which is more or less impermeable. During the Pleistocene, the Račna Karst Field was a lake and water drained from it into the karst underground through what are now dry inflow caves higher on the slopes at the edge of the area. At that time, Kopanj Hill was an island in the lake.

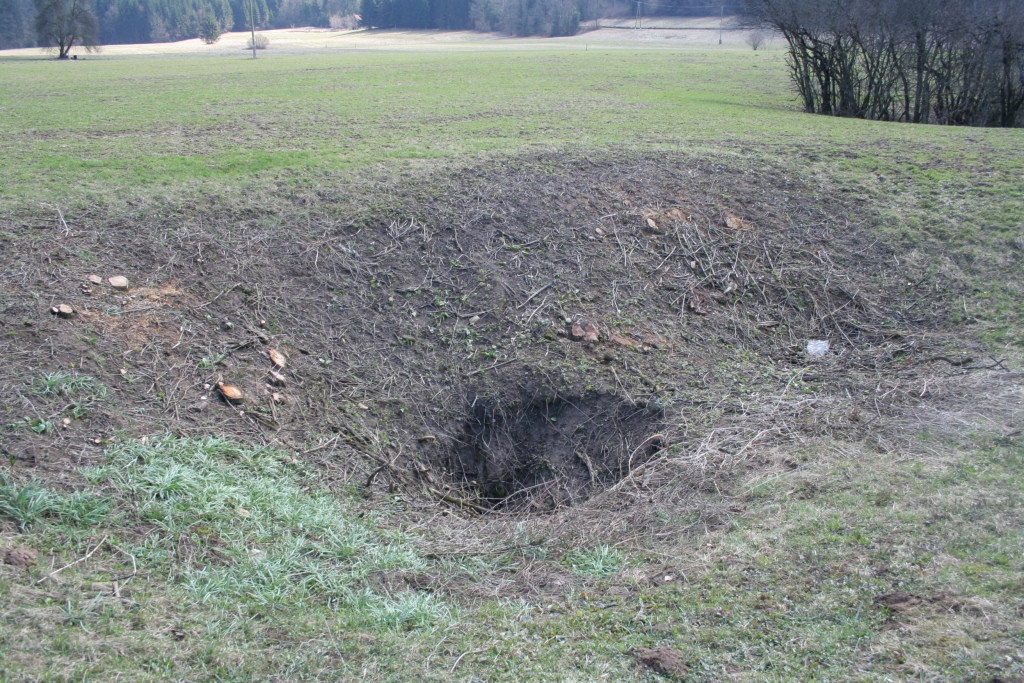
An estavelle in the Račna Karst Field

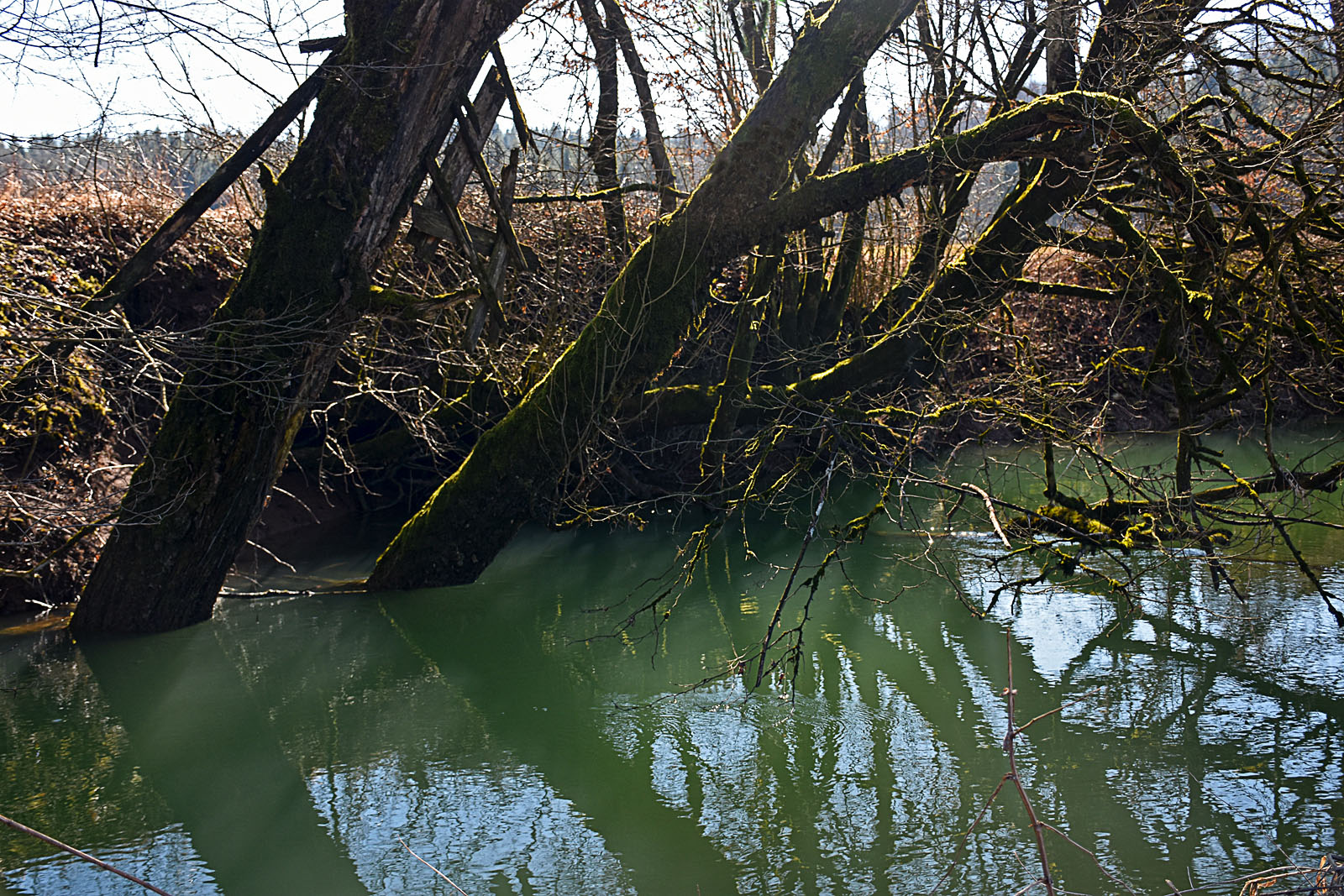
Bank of Šica Creek

The hydrology of the area consists mainly of three rivers. The Dobravka River is a continuation of two non-karst streams: Grosupeljščica Creek and Podlomščica Creek. It meanders for nearly 1 kilometer (0.62 mi) through the karst field and then disappears into the ground. Both of the true karst streams, Zelenka Creek and Šica Creek, originate at karst springs on the edge of the karst field and then flow across it from the west toward the east. Zelenka Creek meanders through the karst field for 2 kilometers (1.2 mi) and is dry during periods of drought. Šica Creek is fed by two springs at its source and meanders for 3 kilometers (1.9 mi). During flooding all three watercourses flow together and flow into Inlet Cave (Slovene: Zatočna jama) at the southeast end of the karst field. Sometimes, when the water does not drain quickly enough, a karst lake forms, reaching as far as the first houses in Velika Račna. The road connecting the region to Grosuplje also often floods, and on 24 October 1993 a flood lasting three weeks flooded the fire station in Velika Račna. All of the water that drains on the east edge of the karst field flows underground to Krka Cave, the source of the Krka River, which is about 5 kilometers (3.1 mi) away as the crow flies. Because water covers potential farmland for part of the year, barriers have been built at both sinkholes into Inlet Cave to catch branches and other debris and allow the water to drain faster. Karst hydrology studies have shown that narrow areas in the depths of the cave that are inaccessible to human exploration are a significant factor in the speed of drainage through the sinkholes.

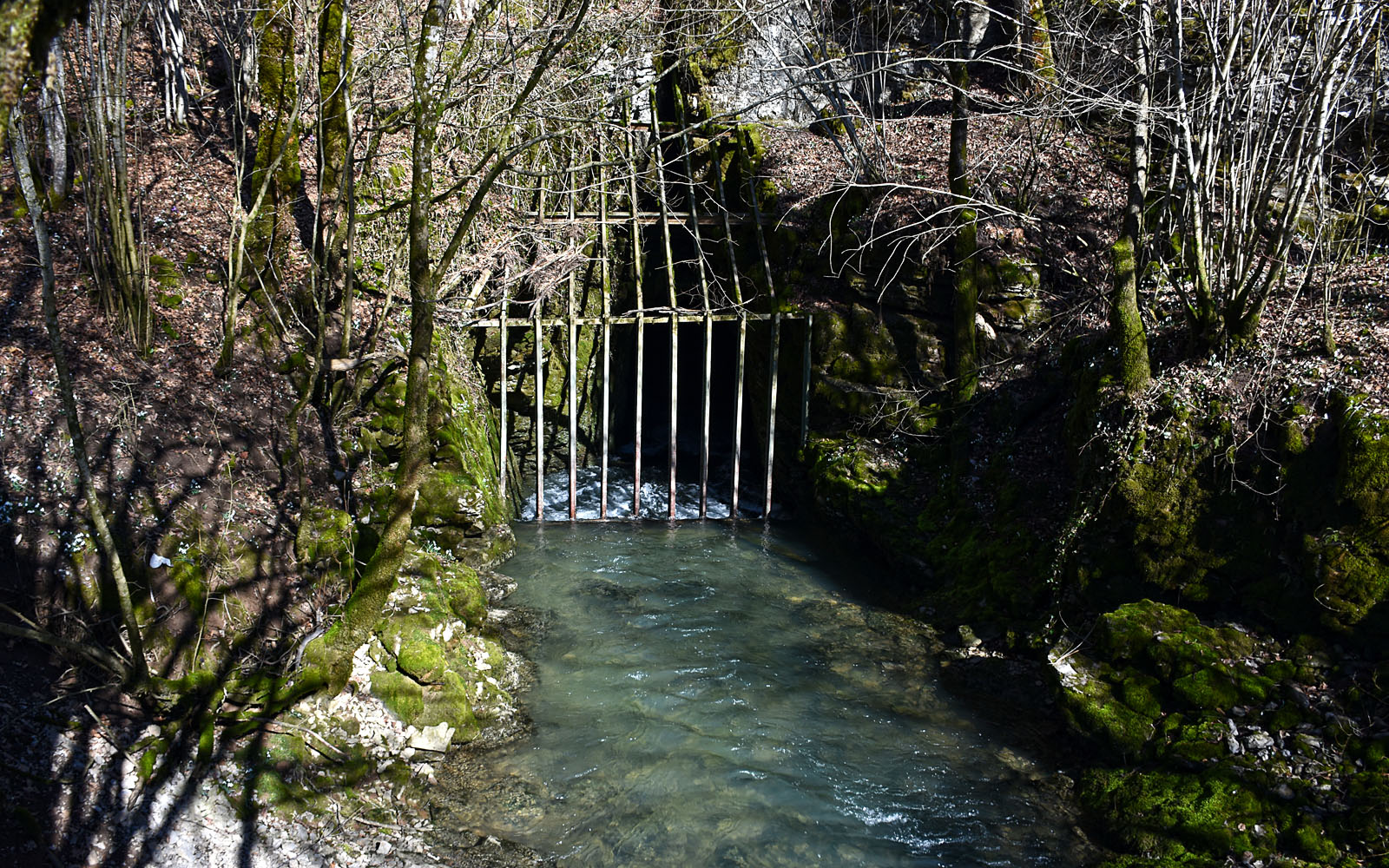
Inlet Cave (Slovene: Zatočna jama)

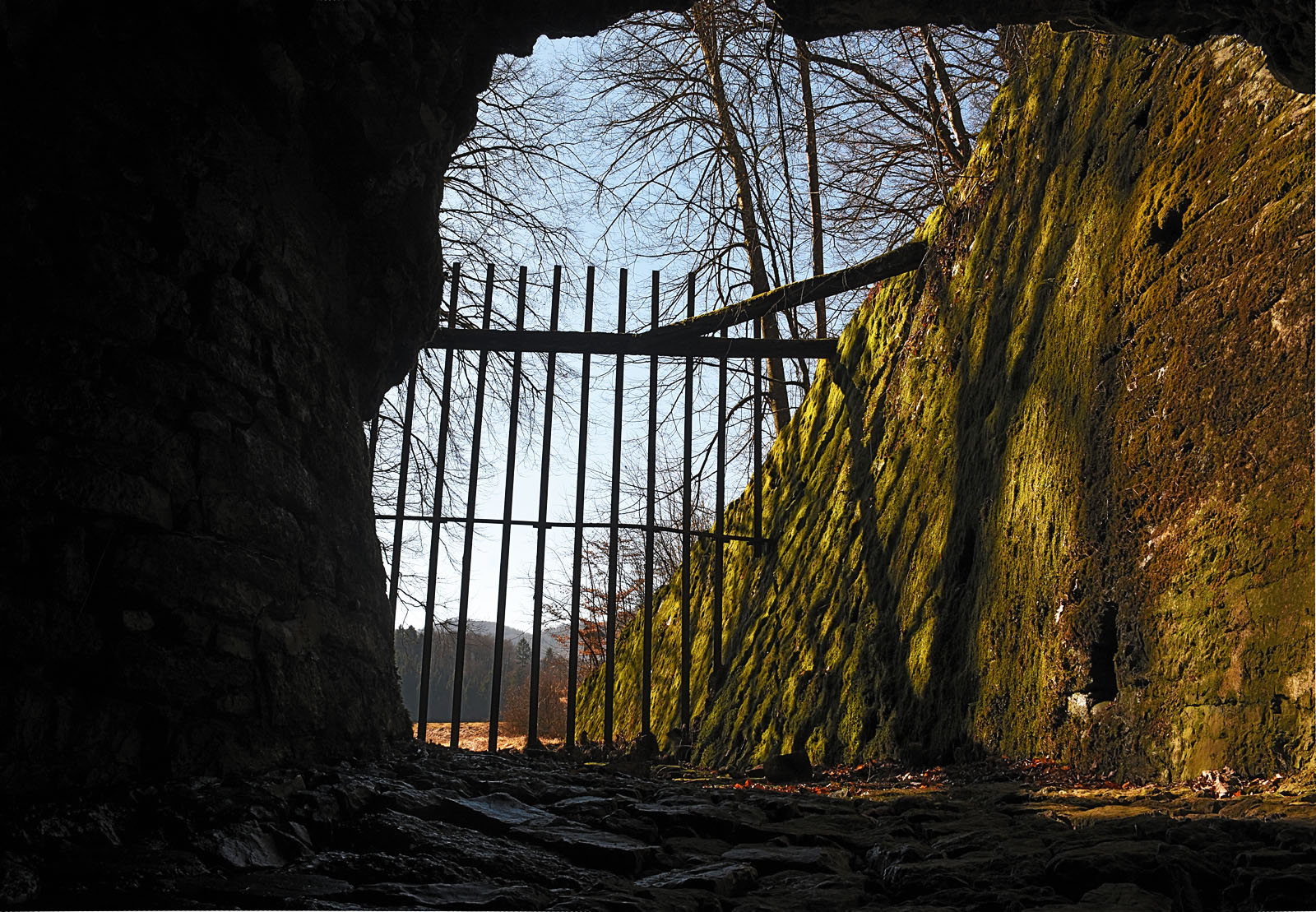
In Lazar Cave (Slovene: Lazarjeva jama)

The Račna Karst Field has several estavelles (locally known as a retje, derived from vretje 'gushing spring'). The largest of these are the Srednjice and Kote estavelles. Another characteristic feature of this karst field is depressions (locally known as a močilo, literally 'pond, puddle') that retain water throughout the entire year. They are important for aquatic flora and fauna, and also function as a water resource for other animals in the karst field during droughts.

== Flora and fauna ==
The Račna Karst Field has several habitats, some of which are significant at the European level. The land is predominantly grassland, with patches of woods and brush here and there. Brush is especially present along the river channels, along with areas covered in sedge or rushes. Spring flowers include the bog violet (Viola uliginosa), snake's head fritillary (Fritillaria meleagris), summer snowflake (Leucojum aestivum), spotted orchid (Dactylorhiza spp.), and marsh orchid (Orchis palustris). Specimens of marsh lousewort (Pedicularis palustris) and march gentian (Gentiana pneumonanthe) are still present but in decline, and due to fertilizer use the oblong-leaved sundew (Drosera intermedia) and white beak-sedge (Rhynchospora alba) have disappeared in the last decade. The area is also a habitat for the swamp cinquefoil (Potentilla palustris) and bogbean (Menyanthes trifoliata), and in some drier areas there are also less hygrophilous plants.

Experts from the Fauna and Flora Mapping Center (Slovene: Center za kartografijo favne in flore) have extensively studied the area's fauna. They recorded 27 species of dragonflies, five of which are threatened. Dragonflies can especially be found in areas with slowly flowing water. There are 68 species of butterflies, of which 14 are threatened. The ecological significance of the Račna Karst Field is highlighted by the fact that 12 of the total 19 species of amphibians in Slovenia are also found here. Some of these are killed in large numbers by cars every spring when they cross the local road to their spawning area. Seventy-eight species of birds nesting here have also been inventoried, as well as two species that only pass through; 24 of these species are on the IUCN Red List of Threatened Species. The threatened European otter (Lutra lutra) can be found in places on the northern edge of the karst field.

== Cultural heritage ==
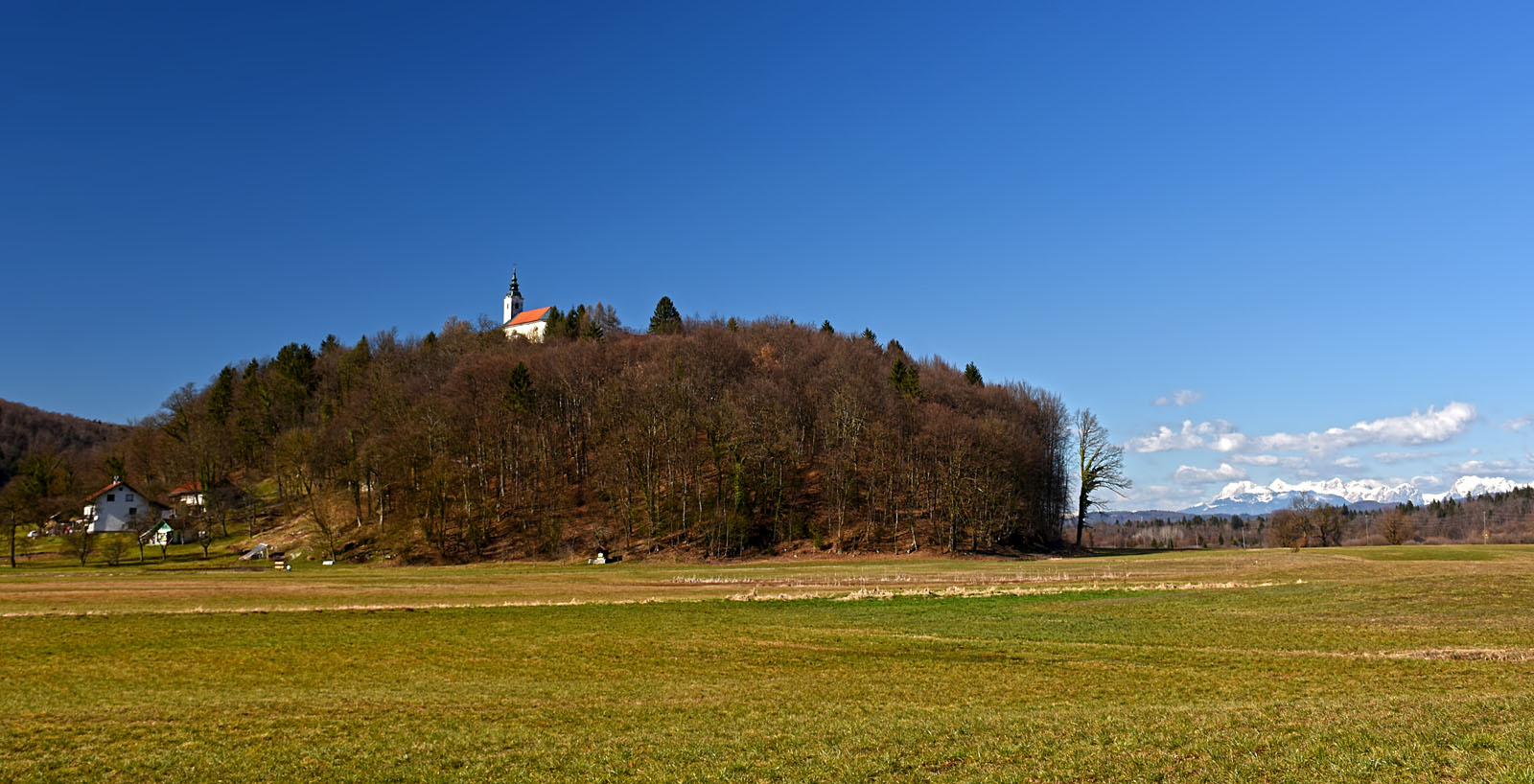
Kopanj Hill

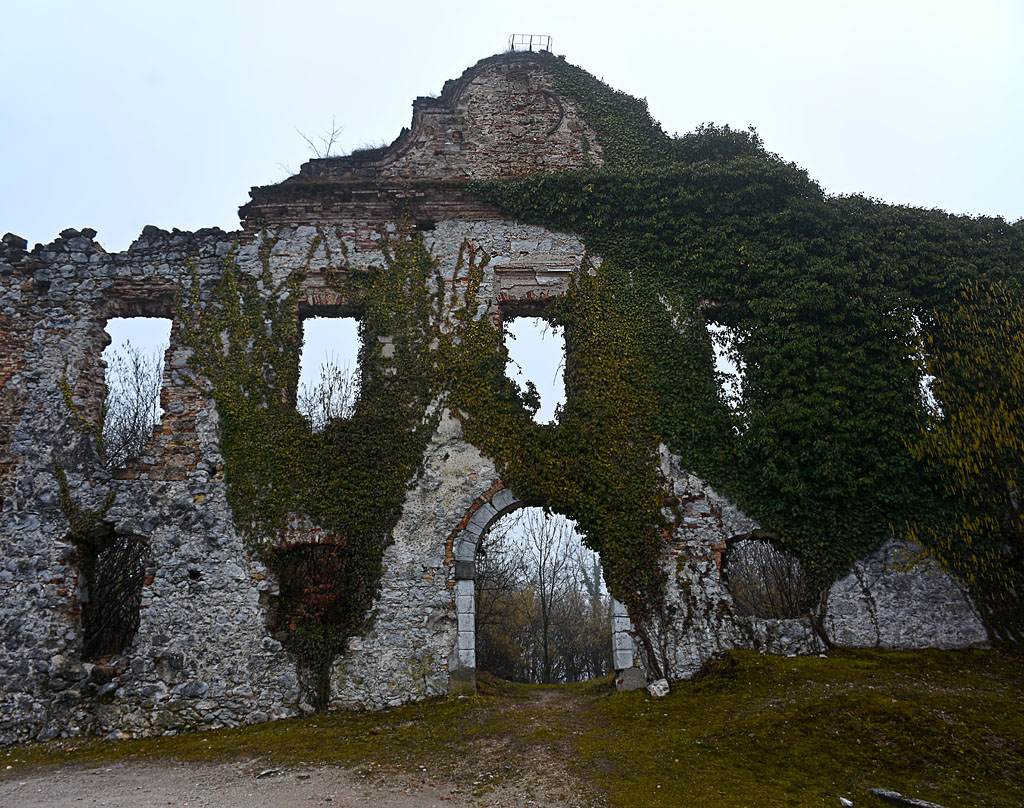
Boštanj Castle

The ruins of medieval Boštanj Castle stand immediately before entering the Račna Karst Field. It was plundered and burned by the Partisans on 12 September 1943. St. Martin's Church, a chapel of ease, stands at the foot of the hill below the castle. Kopanj Hill, an isolated elevation that commands a strategic position and served as a refuge for the locals in prehistory and during Ottoman incursions, is a popular excursion destination and a cultural site. Assumption Church at the top of the hill was first mentioned in written sources in 1433. During the 19th century Jožef Prešeren, uncle of the Slovene poet France Prešeren, served as a curate at the church. A branch school of the Grosuplje Primary School also stands on the hill and has operated since 1865. The northern slope of Kopanj Hill is the site of Mary's Spring (Slovene: Marijin studenček), which folk belief has endowed with supernatural power. The spring is said to go dry only during times of great catastrophes (e.g., during the Second World War). The village at the foot of the hill, Velika Račna, also has cultural historical value, and features a large Baroque chapel that was created under the administration of Čušperk Castle.
