= Velika Račna =

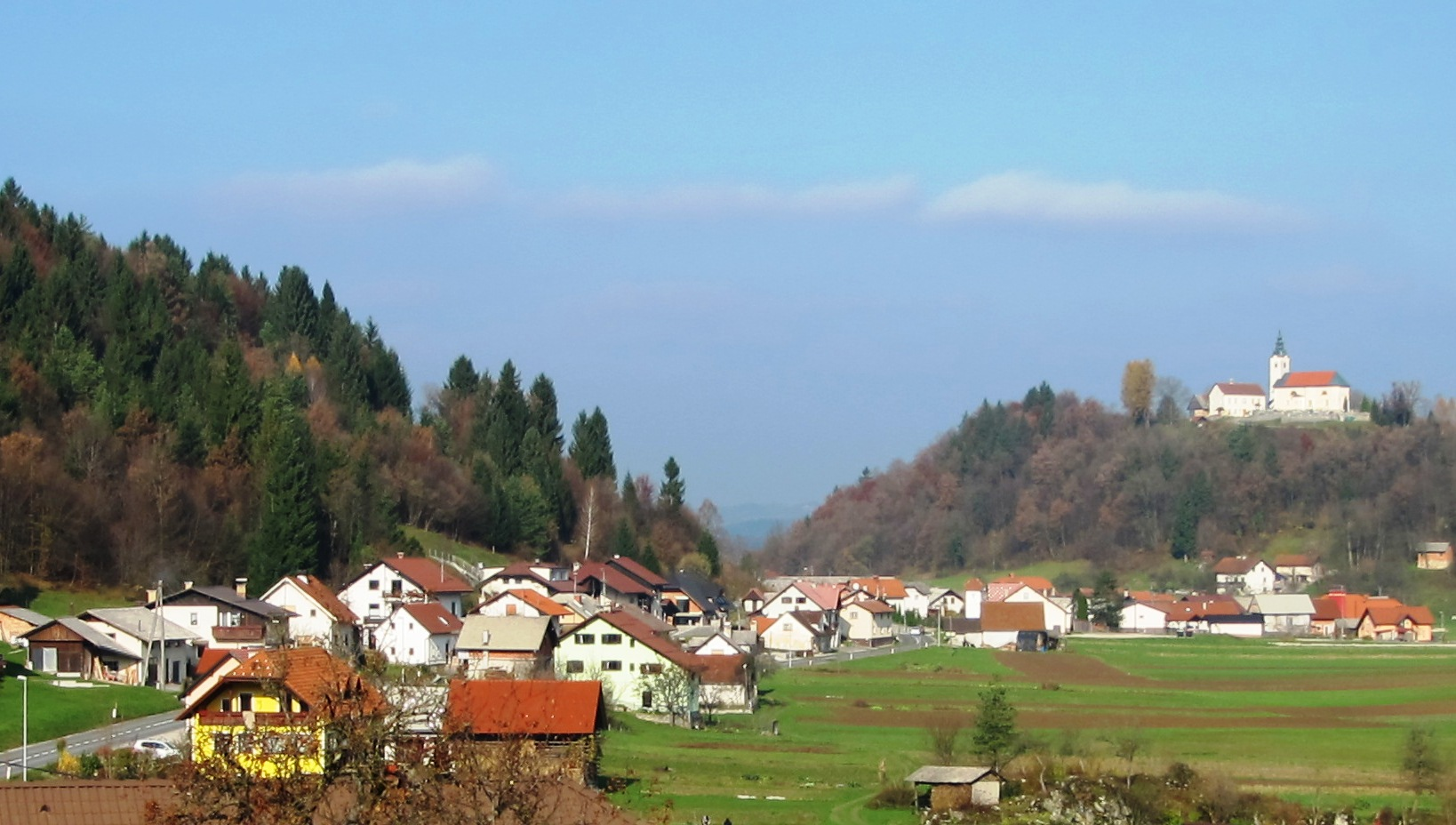

- Location in Slovenia
- Coordinates: 45°54′15.14″N 14°41′24.08″E
- Country: Slovenia
- Traditional region: Lower Carniola
- Statistical region: Central Slovenia
- Municipality: Grosuplje

Area
  - Total: 3.51 km^{2} (1.36 sq mi)
- Elevation: 327 m (1,073 ft)

Population (2002)
  - Total: 211

Velika Račna (pronounced [ˈʋeːlika ˈɾaːtʃna]; German: Großratschna) is a village in the Municipality of Grosuplje in central Slovenia. The area is part of the historical region of Lower Carniola. The municipality is now included in the Central Slovenia Statistical Region. Kopanj Hill rises 70 m above the village to the north; geologically, the hill is a mix of karst limestone and dolomite. The hamlet of Kopanj is located on Kopanj Hill.

== Name ==
The name Velika Račna literally means 'big Račna', distinguishing it from neighboring Mala Račna (literally, 'little Račna'). Velika Račna was first attested in written sources in 1313–1315 as in dem merern Ratek. The name Račna was also attested as Radnickh in 1436, Rednigk in 1454, and Raditschin in 1458. The modern name is a contraction of *Radičina, ultimately derived from the patronymic Radiťь, based on the hypocorism Rado. The name thus originally means 'Rado's village'. The local adjective form radenski (cf. Radensko polje 'Račna Karst Field') and the demonym Radenc are based on the older form of the name. Popular imagination connects the name Račna with the Slovene common noun raca 'duck', of which there are many in the Račna karst polje. In the past, the settlement was known as Großratschna in German.

== History ==
A prehistoric settlement stood on Kopanj Hill, and Roman graves have been discovered in Velika Račna. A part-time school was established in the village in 1836. A primary school was established on Kopanj Hill, just below the church, in 1865. It is now a branch of the Louis Adamič Primary School, located in Grosuplje. The Partisans burned the school on 17 December 1943. Viktor Pristov (1919–1997), who had served as the parish priest of Velika Račna since 1966, was murdered in the rectory on 8 July 1997.

== Religious heritage ==
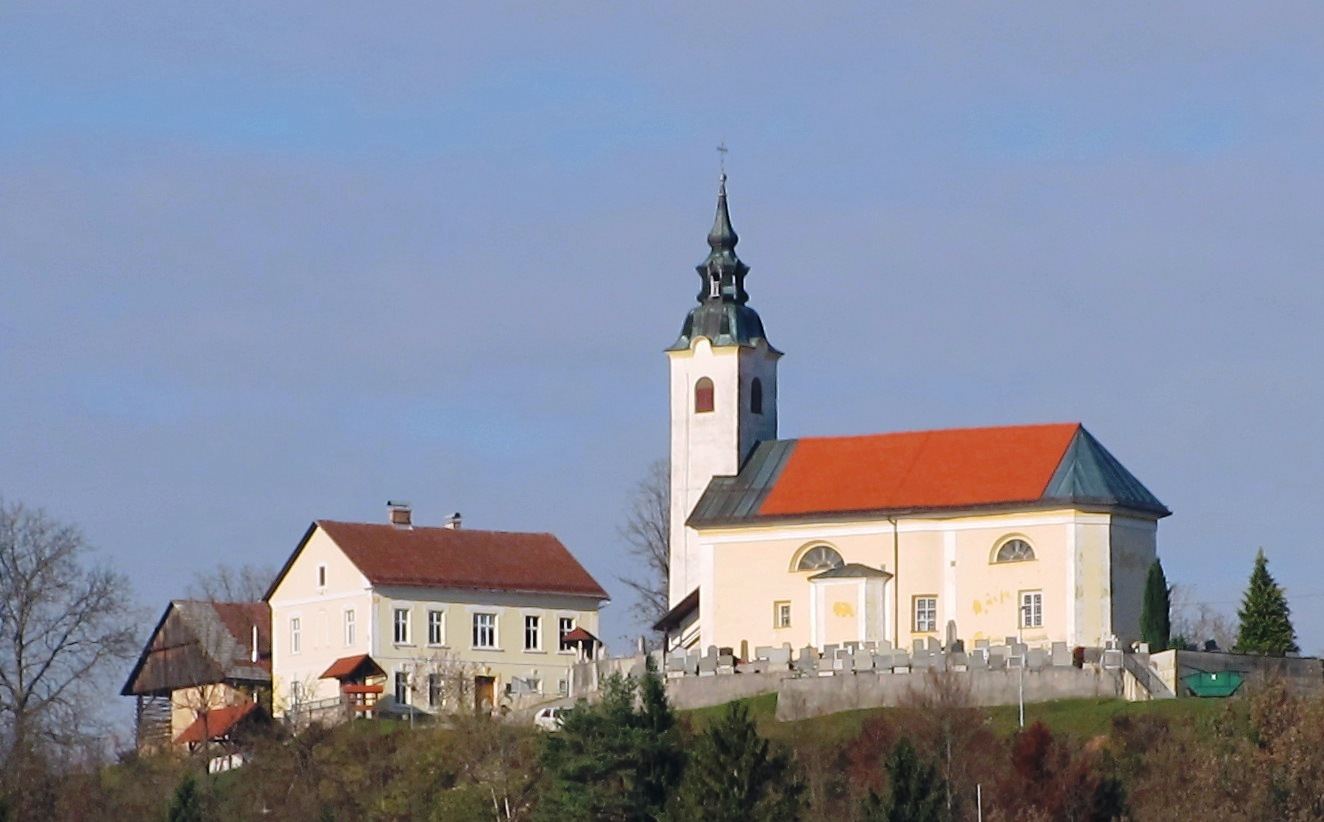
Kopanj Hill with Assumption Church and the rectory

The local parish church, built on Kopanj Hill north of the settlement, is dedicated to the Assumption of Mary. It belongs to the Parish of Kopanj and the Roman Catholic Archdiocese of Ljubljana. It dates to the 15th century with 18th- and 19th-century additions. The church is built on the site of an ancient fortification and was first mentioned in written sources in 1433. During the Ottoman wars in Europe, the church was surrounded by a defensive wall. The poet France Prešeren spent three years of his childhood (1807–1810) living with his uncle Joseph in the rectory next to the church. The Partisans burned the rectory on 17 December 1943. The Partisans burned the church itself on 15 February 1944. The parish priest and some locals were able to save the monstrance and ciborium from the burning church, but the fire destroyed the 1769 painting The Assumption of Mary by Anton Cebej.

A chapel dedicated to Saint Margaret stands in the village. It was built as a vow seeking protection from the floods that regularly affect the village and it was first mentioned in written sources in 1433. The chapel was reworked in the Baroque style in 1739 and its height was increased in 1838. Its Baroque altar dates to 1739 and it contains the crypt of the Lazzarini noble family.

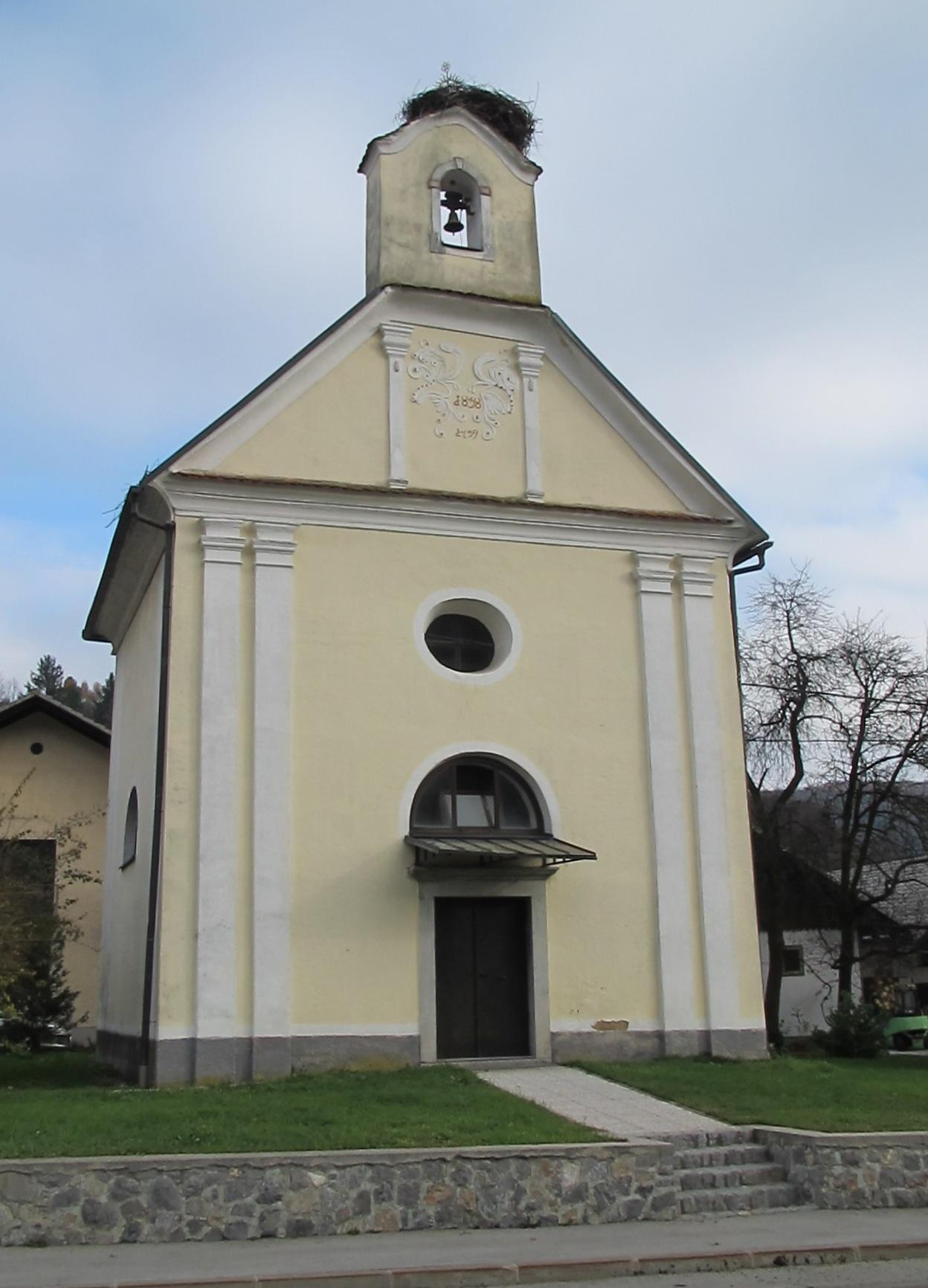
Village chapel

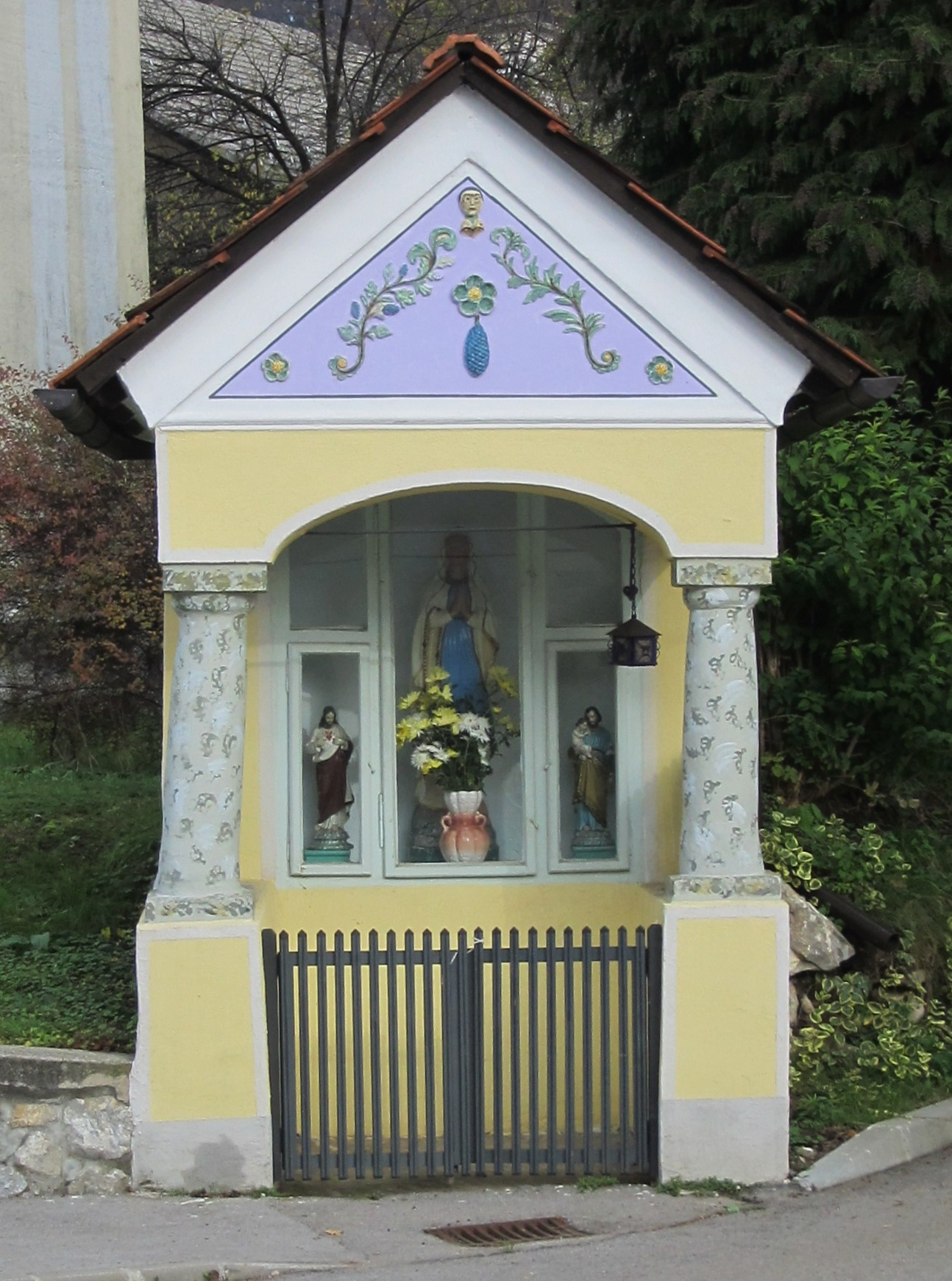
Village chapel-shrine

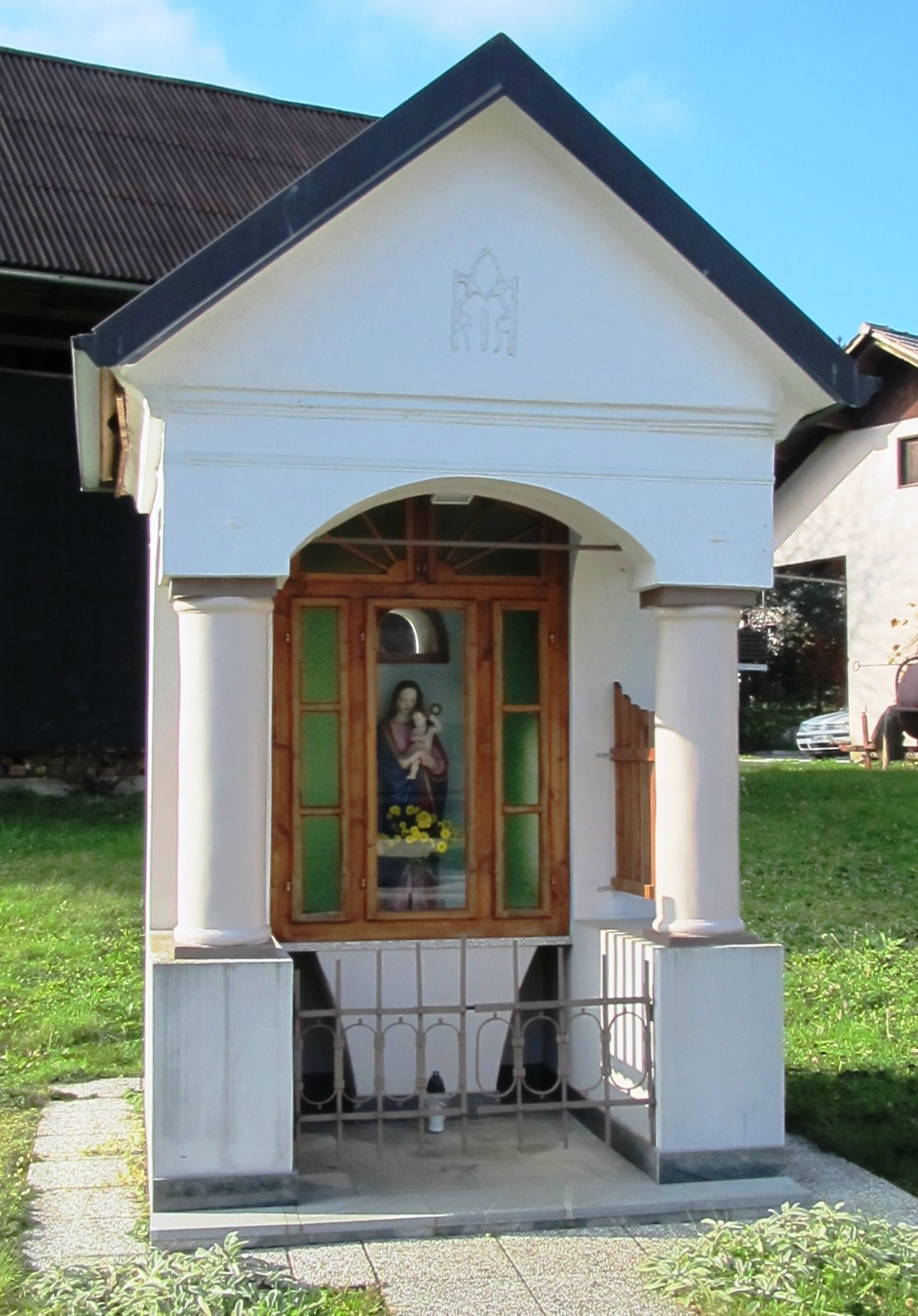
Village chapel-shrine

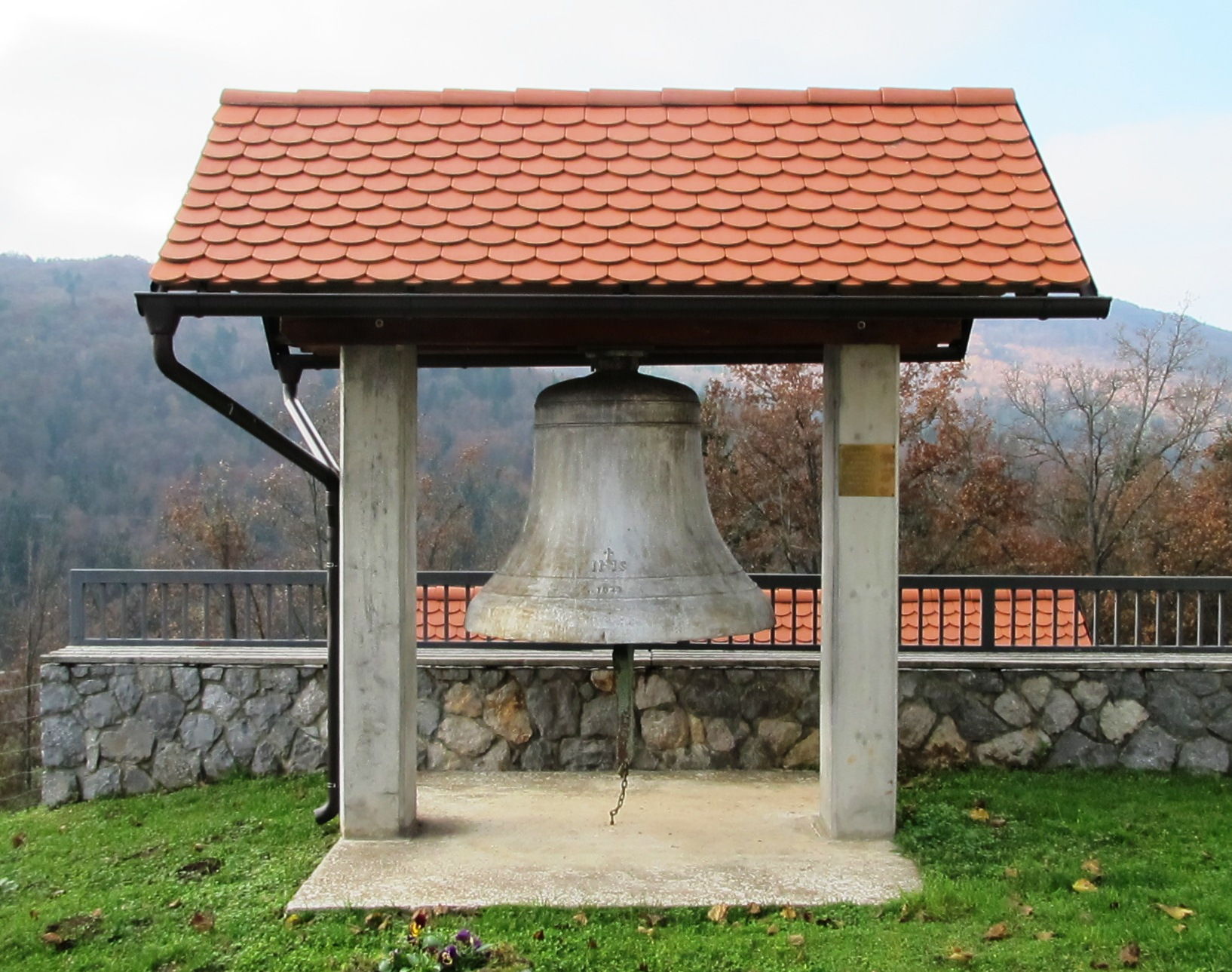
Church bell on Kopanj Hill

== Notable people ==
Notable people that were born or lived in Velika Račna include:

- France Prešeren (1800–1849), poet
- Jožef Prešeren (1752–1835), parish priest from 1802 to 1820 and uncle of France Prešeren

== Gallery ==
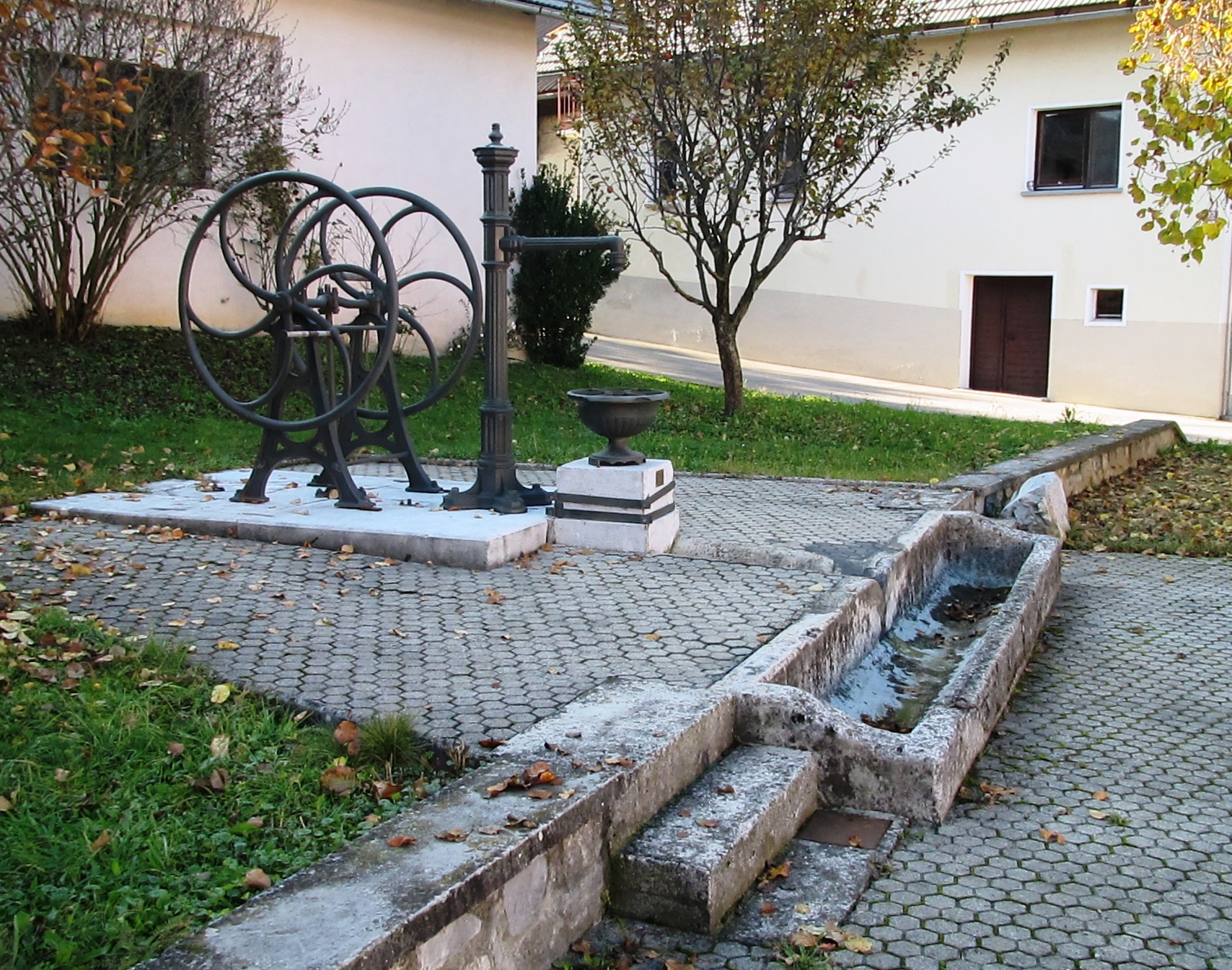
Village pump and water trough from 1897

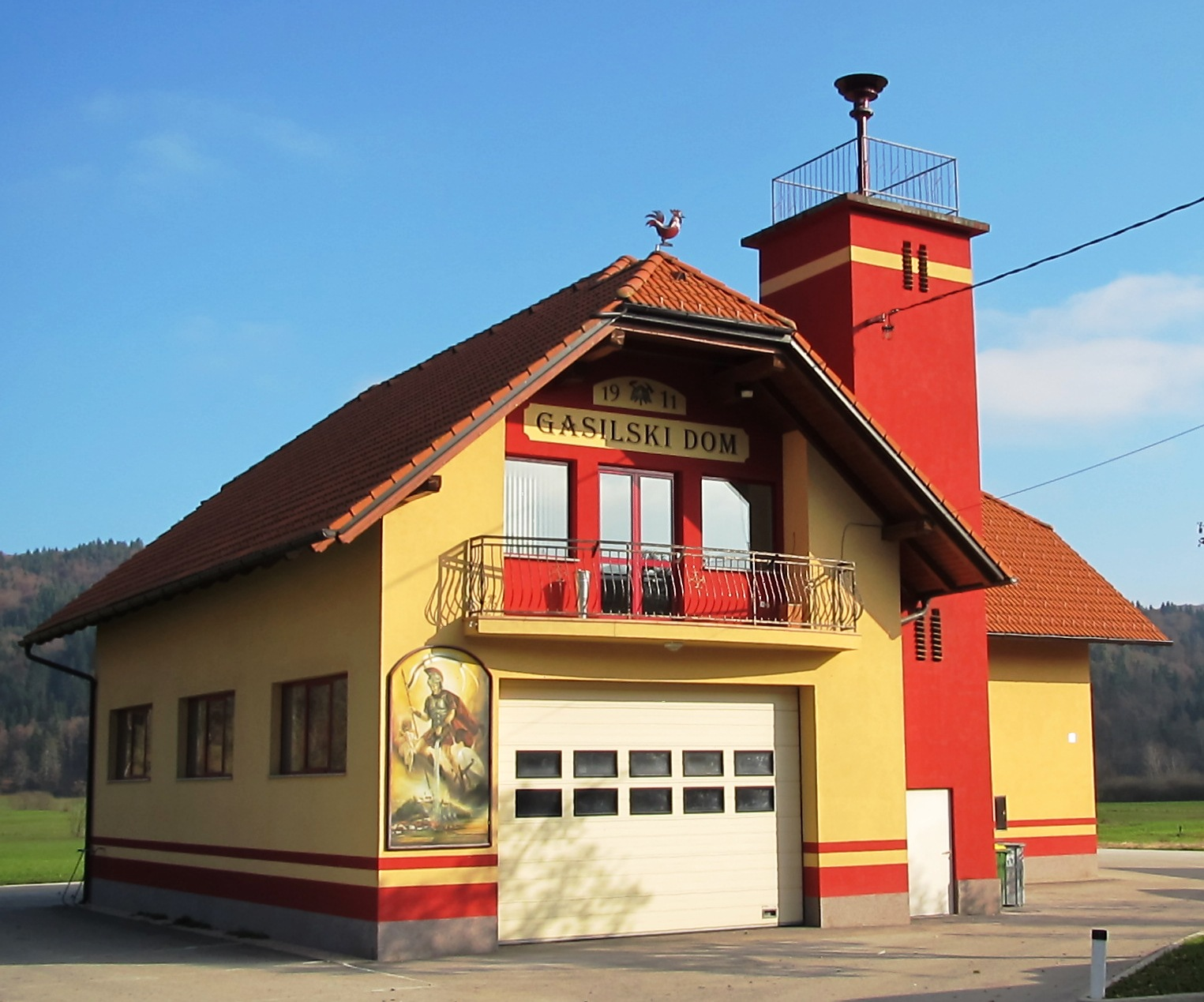
Village fire station
