= Mala Račna =

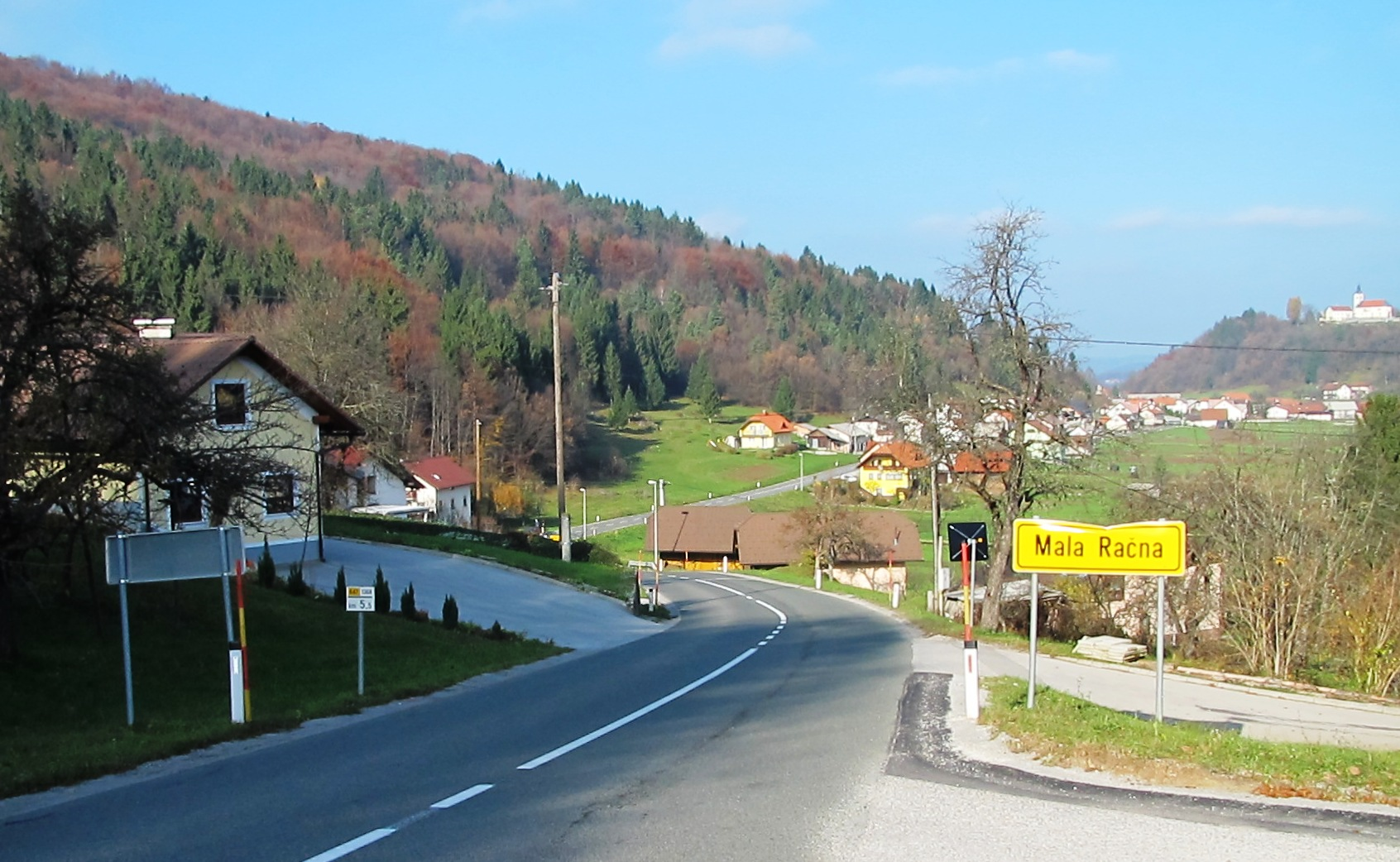

- Location in Slovenia
- Coordinates: 45°53′46.02″N 14°41′37.69″E
- Country: Slovenia
- Traditional region: Lower Carniola
- Statistical region: Central Slovenia
- Municipality: Grosuplje

Area
  - Total: 3.01 km^{2} (1.16 sq mi)
- Elevation: 347.8 m (1,141 ft)

Population (2002)
  - Total: 164

Mala Račna (pronounced [ˈmaːla ˈɾaːtʃna]; German: Kleinratschna) is a settlement in the Municipality of Grosuplje in central Slovenia. The area is part of the historical region of Lower Carniola. The municipality is now included in the Central Slovenia Statistical Region.

== Name ==
The name Mala Račna literally means 'little Račna', distinguishing it from neighboring Velika Račna (literally, 'big Račna'). Mala Račna was first attested in written sources in 1313–1315 as in dem wenigern Ratek. The name Račna was also attested as Radnickh in 1436, Rednigk in 1454, and Raditschin in 1458. The modern name is a contraction of *Radičina, ultimately derived from the patronymic Radiťь, based on the hypocorism Rado. The name thus originally means 'Rado's village'. The local adjective form radenski (cf. Radensko polje 'Račna Karst Field') and the demonym Radenc are based on the older form of the name. Popular imagination connects the name Račna with the Slovene common noun raca 'duck', of which there are many in the Račna Karst Field. In the past, the settlement was known as Kleinratschna in German.

== Religious heritage ==
A small chapel-shrine in the settlement dates to the early 20th century.
