= Veliko Mlačevo =

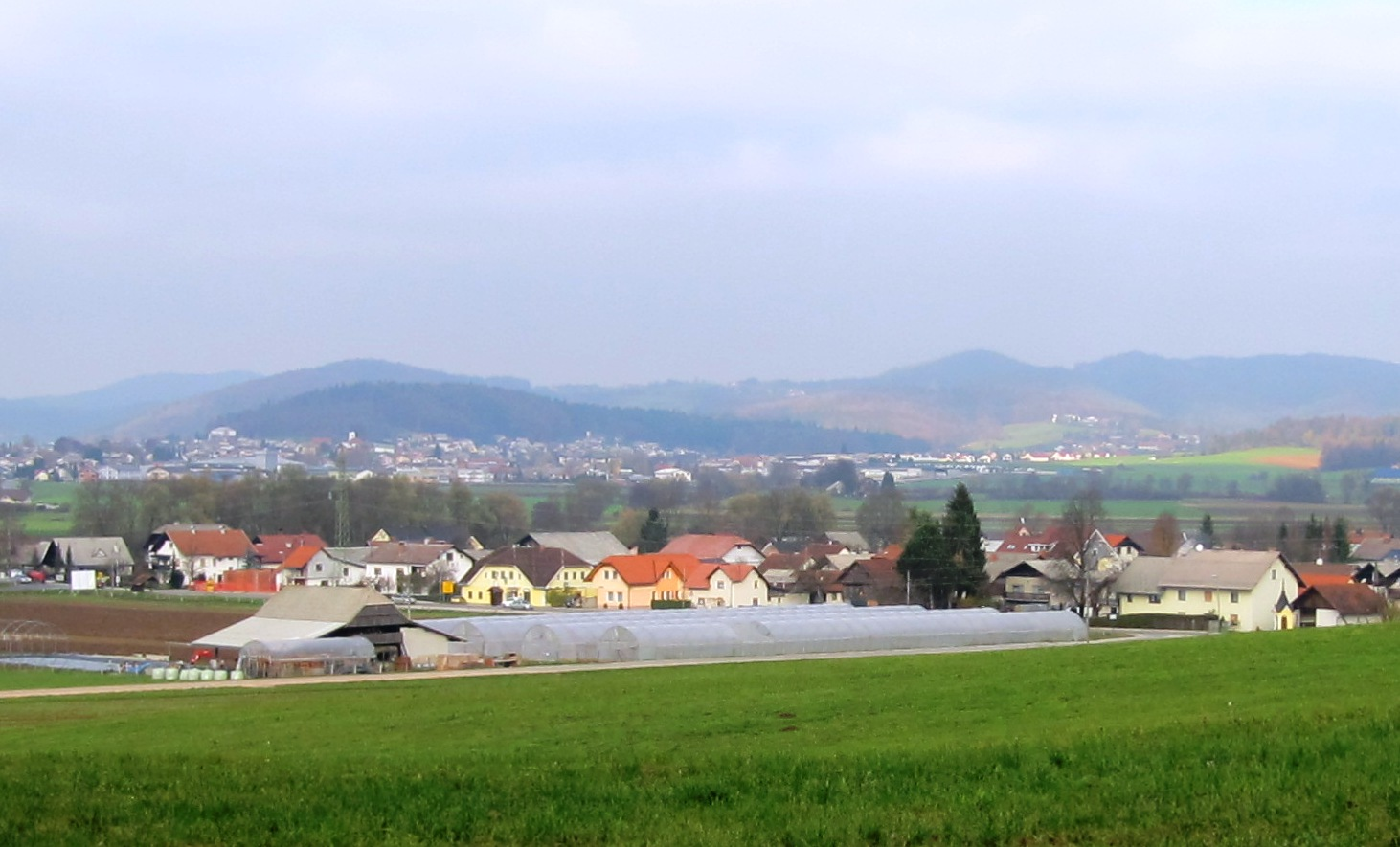

- Location in Slovenia
- Coordinates: 45°56′23.28″N 14°40′38.8″E
- Country: Slovenia
- Traditional region: Lower Carniola
- Statistical region: Central Slovenia
- Municipality: Grosuplje

Area
  - Total: 1.69 km^{2} (0.65 sq mi)
- Elevation: 328.4 m (1,077 ft)

Population (2002)
  - Total: 438

Veliko Mlačevo (pronounced [ˈʋeːlikɔ ˈmlaːtʃɛʋɔ]; German: Großmlatschevo) is a village in the Municipality of Grosuplje in central Slovenia. It lies just southeast of Grosuplje itself in the historical region of Lower Carniola. The municipality is now included in the Central Slovenia Statistical Region. The settlement includes the hamlet of Boštanj (German: Weißenstein) south of the main settlement.

== Name ==
The name Veliko Mlačevo literally means 'big Mlačevo', distinguishing it from the neighboring settlement of Malo Mlačevo (literally, 'little Mlačevo'). The name was first attested in 1277 as zemlassen (i.e., ze mlassen 'at Mlassen'), and in 1313 as in merern Maltscher (Mlatschen), in 1399 as zem grossen Mlatse, and in 1422 as an dem grossen Latschach, among other variations. The name is presumably derived from *Mlačevo selo/polje, ultimately meaning 'village/field belonging to Milač (or Mladič)'. In the past the German name was variously Großmlatschevo, Groß-Mlatschen, Großmlatschou, or Groß-Mlatschou.

== History ==
Before the Second World War, Veliko Mlačevo had a population of 156 people living in 28 houses.

== Church ==
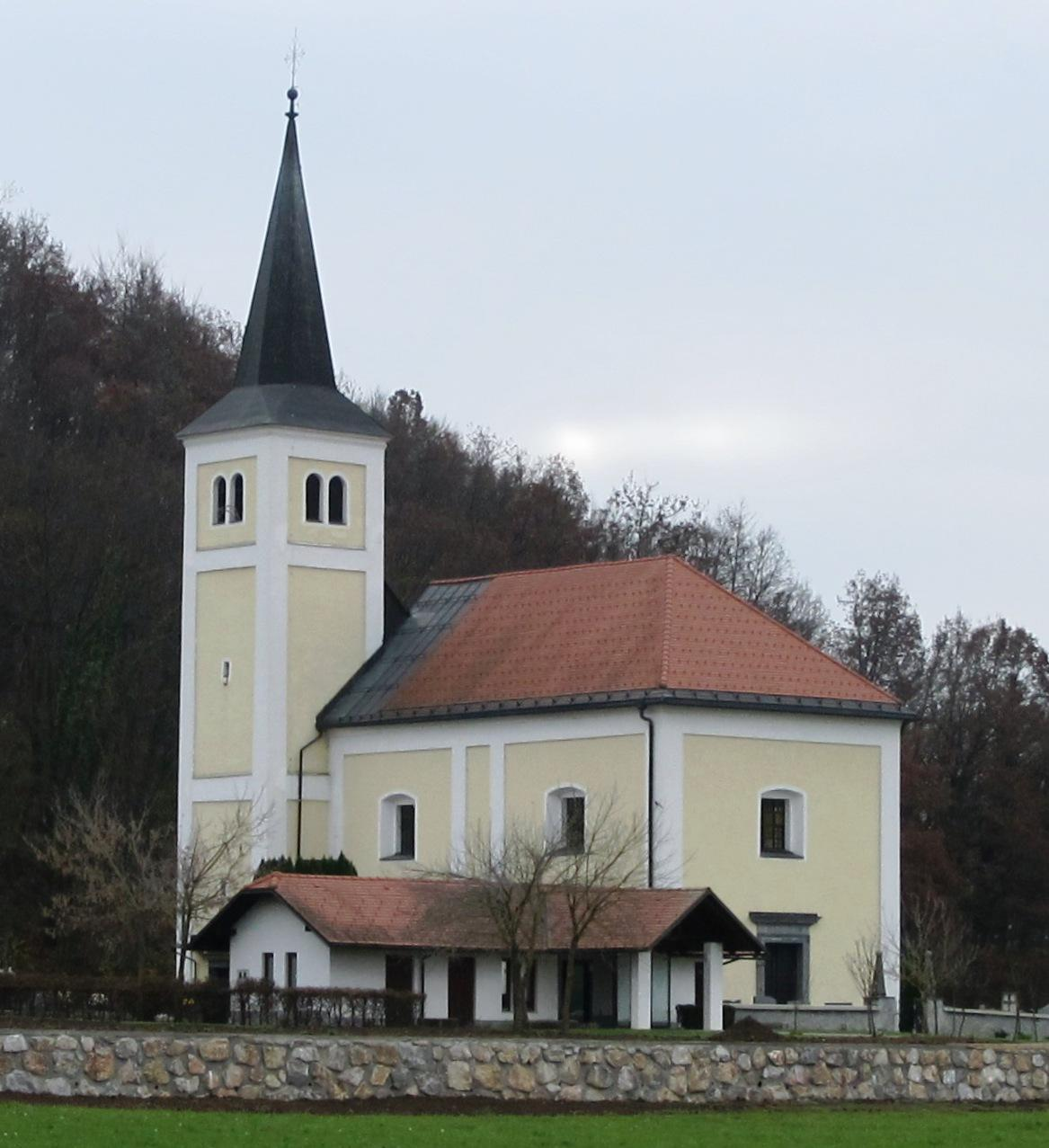
Saint Martin's Church

The local church is dedicated to Saint Martin and belongs to the Parish of Žalna. It is originally a 14th-century Gothic building that was heavily remodeled in the Baroque style in the 18th century. The church was first mentioned in written sources in 1331. The church has an early Baroque high barrel-vaulted nave complemented by 18th-century altar furnishings. The main altar dates from 1716, and the wall paintings date from the end of the 17th century. A painting of Saint Anne on the north side altar is the work of Franc Jelovšek (1700–1764), the paintings on the south side altar are the work of Matija Koželj (1842–1917), and the Stations of the Cross are works from the school of Leopold Layer (1752–1828). The church is surrounded by a cemetery.

== Gallery ==
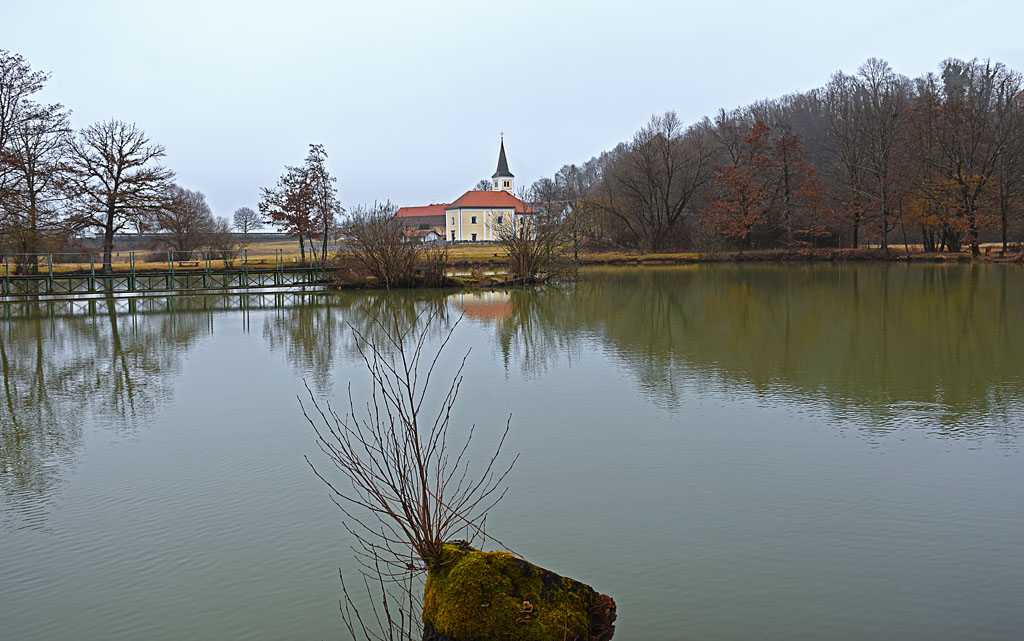
Boštanj Pond and St. Martin's Church
