= Malo Mlačevo =

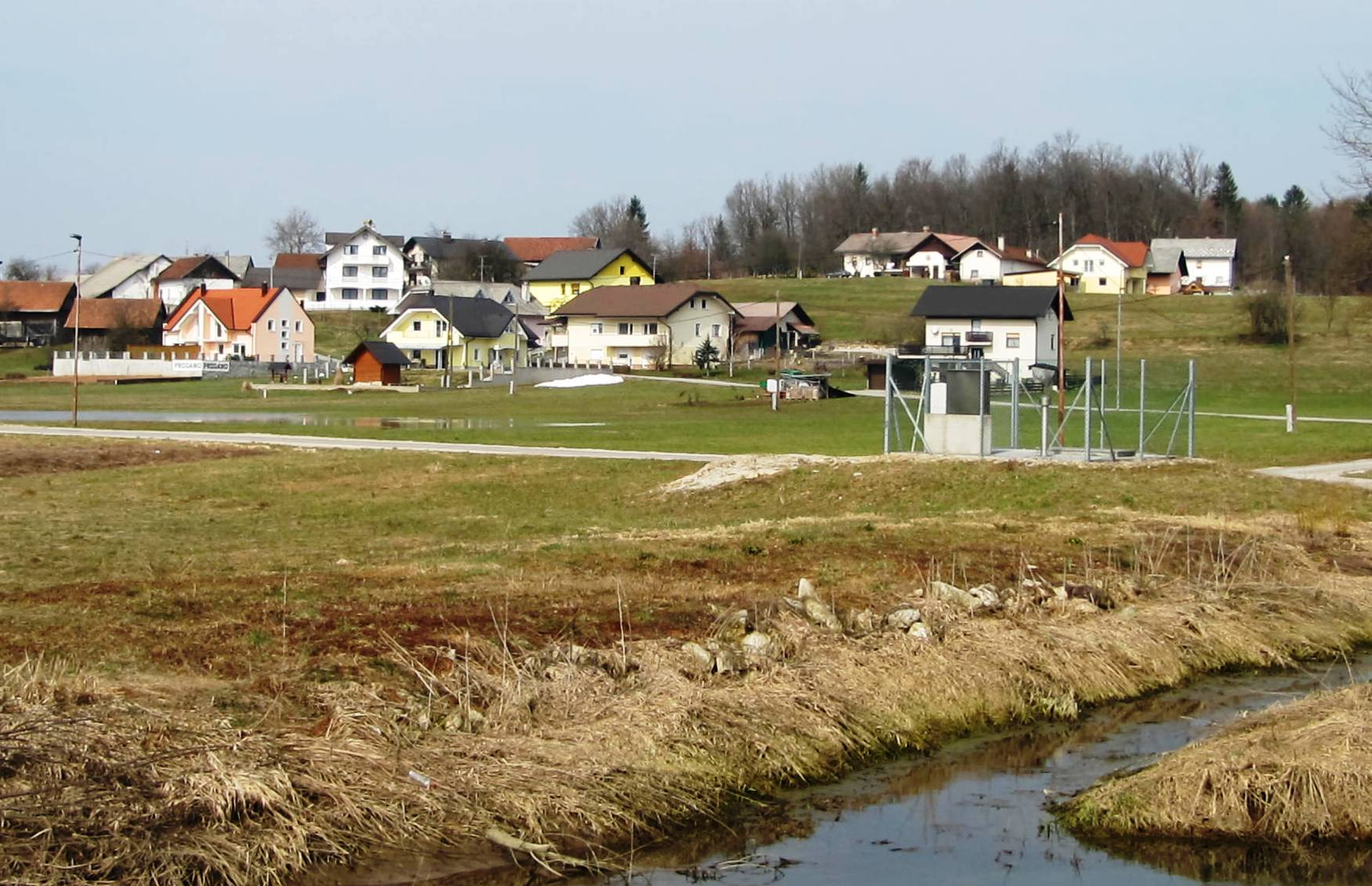

- Location in Slovenia
- Coordinates: 45°56′9.58″N 14°40′5.45″E
- Country: Slovenia
- Traditional region: Lower Carniola
- Statistical region: Central Slovenia
- Municipality: Grosuplje

Area
  - Total: 2.25 km^{2} (0.87 sq mi)
- Elevation: 333.2 m (1,093 ft)

Population (2002)
  - Total: 160

Malo Mlačevo (pronounced [ˈmaːlɔ ˈmlaːtʃɛʋɔ]; German: Kleinmlatschevo) is a village south of Grosuplje in central Slovenia. The area is part of the historical region of Lower Carniola. The Municipality of Grosuplje is now included in the Central Slovenia Statistical Region.

== Name ==
The name Malo Mlačevo literally means 'little Mlačevo', distinguishing it from the neighboring settlement of Veliko Mlačevo (literally, 'big Mlačevo'). The name was first attested in 1277 as zemlassen (i.e., ze mlassen 'at Mlassen'), and in 1313 as in dem wenigern Maltscher (Mlatschen), and in 1496 as Klein Mlatscherin, among other variations. The name is presumably derived from *Mlačevo selo/polje, ultimately meaning 'village/field belonging to Milač (or Mladič)'. In the past the German name was Kleinmlatschevo.

== Cultural heritage ==
A small roadside chapel-shrine in the settlement was built in the first quarter of the 20th century.
