= Boštanj, Grosuplje =

Boštanj Boštanjska Vas
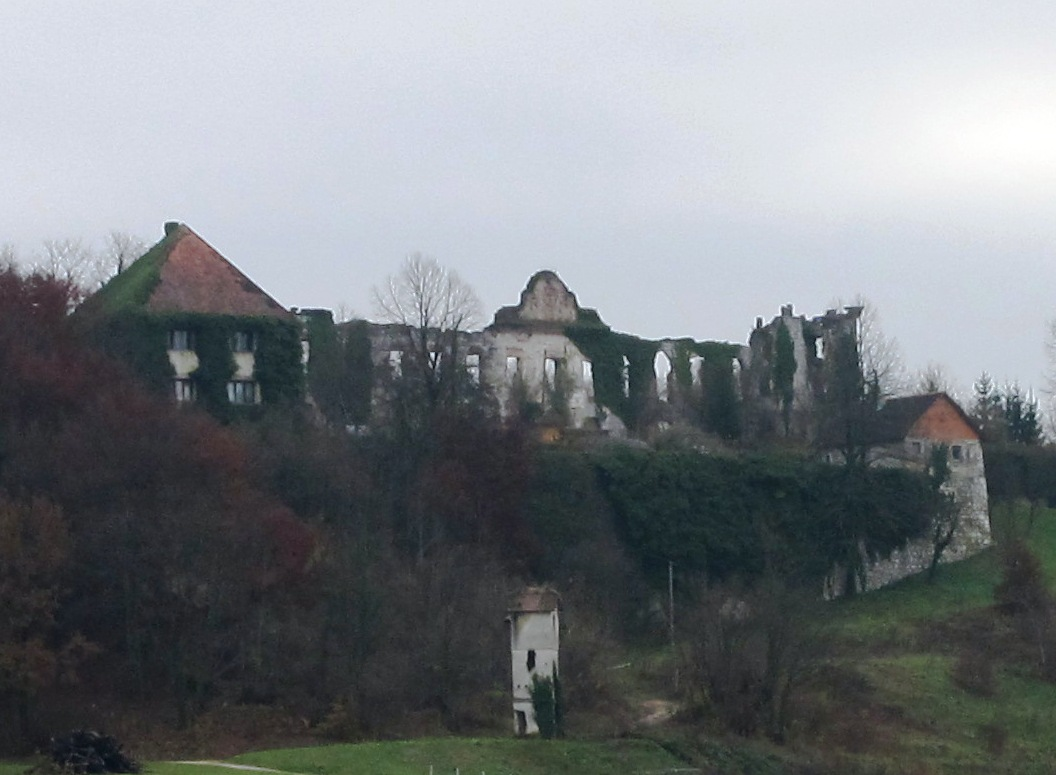

- Location in Slovenia
- Coordinates: 45°56′05″N 14°40′42″E
- Country: Slovenia
- Traditional region: Lower Carniola
- Statistical region: Central Slovenia
- Municipality: Grosuplje
- Elevation: 328 m (1,076 ft)

Boštanj (pronounced [ˈbɔːʃtan], sometimes Boštanjska vas, German: Weißenstein) is a formerly independent settlement in the southern part of the village of Veliko Mlačevo in central Slovenia. It belongs to the Municipality of Grosuplje. It is part of the traditional region of Lower Carniola and is now included with the rest of the municipality in the Central Slovenia Statistical Region.

== Geography ==
Boštanj stands on a hill east of Saint Martin's Church in Veliko Mlačevo. Podlomščica Creek, which flows into the Račna Karst Field, runs past the base of the hill.

== History ==
Prehistoric burial mounds and Roman graves have been discovered at Boštanj, attesting to early habitation of the area. The Boštanj state-run farm was established after the Second World War and sold milk to Ljubljana. A brick works south of the settlement was abandoned in 1962, and a sawmill near Boštanj stopped operating in 1965. Boštanj was annexed by Veliko Mlačevo in 1953, ending its existence as an independent settlement.

== Castle ==
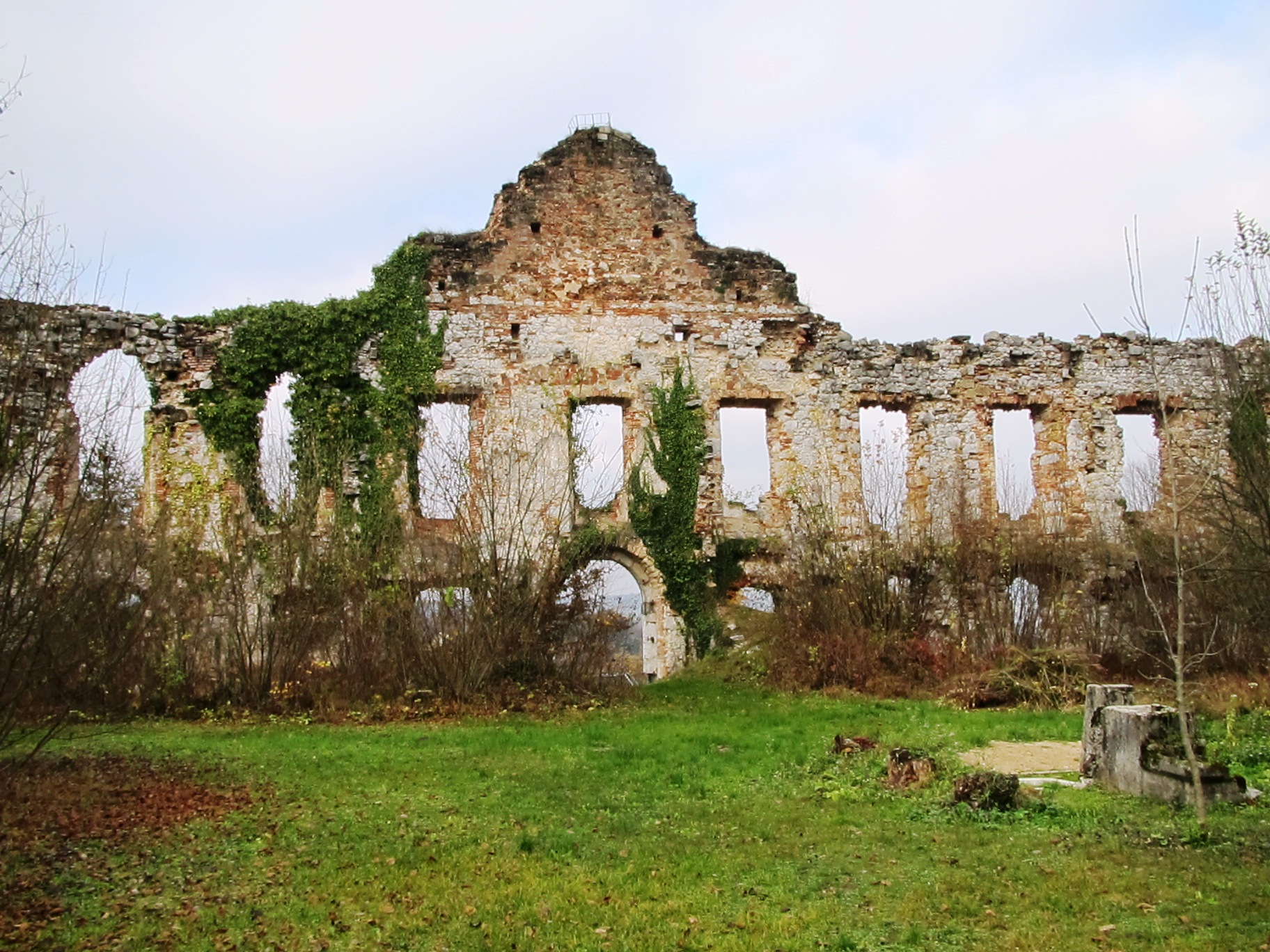
Interior

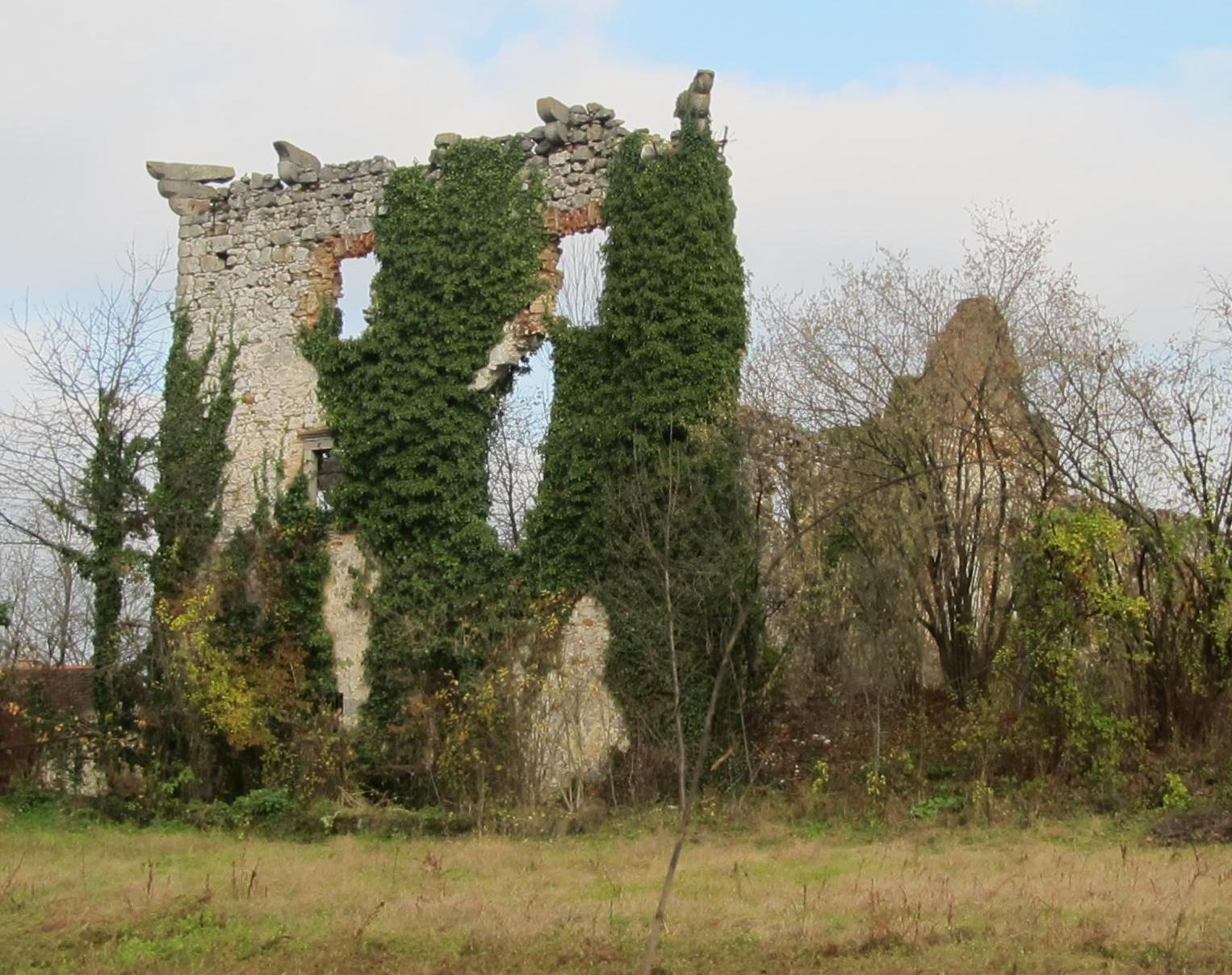
South wall

Boštanj Castle ruins

Boštanj Castle (Slovene: grad Boštanj, German: Weißenstein) stands on the foundations of a Roman fortification. It was built up in the mid-16th century by Jacob von Lamberg. In 1678 ownership was assumed by the Ursini von Blagay family, who remained the owners until the beginning of the 20th century. It was a Renaissance castle designed like a fortress with a central rectangular building fortified with towers and a defensive wall. The castle contained many late Gothic and Renaissance architectural elements, and also featured valuable Rococo and Classicist murals and ceiling paintings. During the Second World War, after forcing besieged White Guard forces at the castle to withdraw to Turjak Castle, the Partisans plundered and burned Boštanj Castle on 12 September 1943. The castle burned for 14 days and the local fire department was forbidden from extinguishing the fire.
