= Žalna =

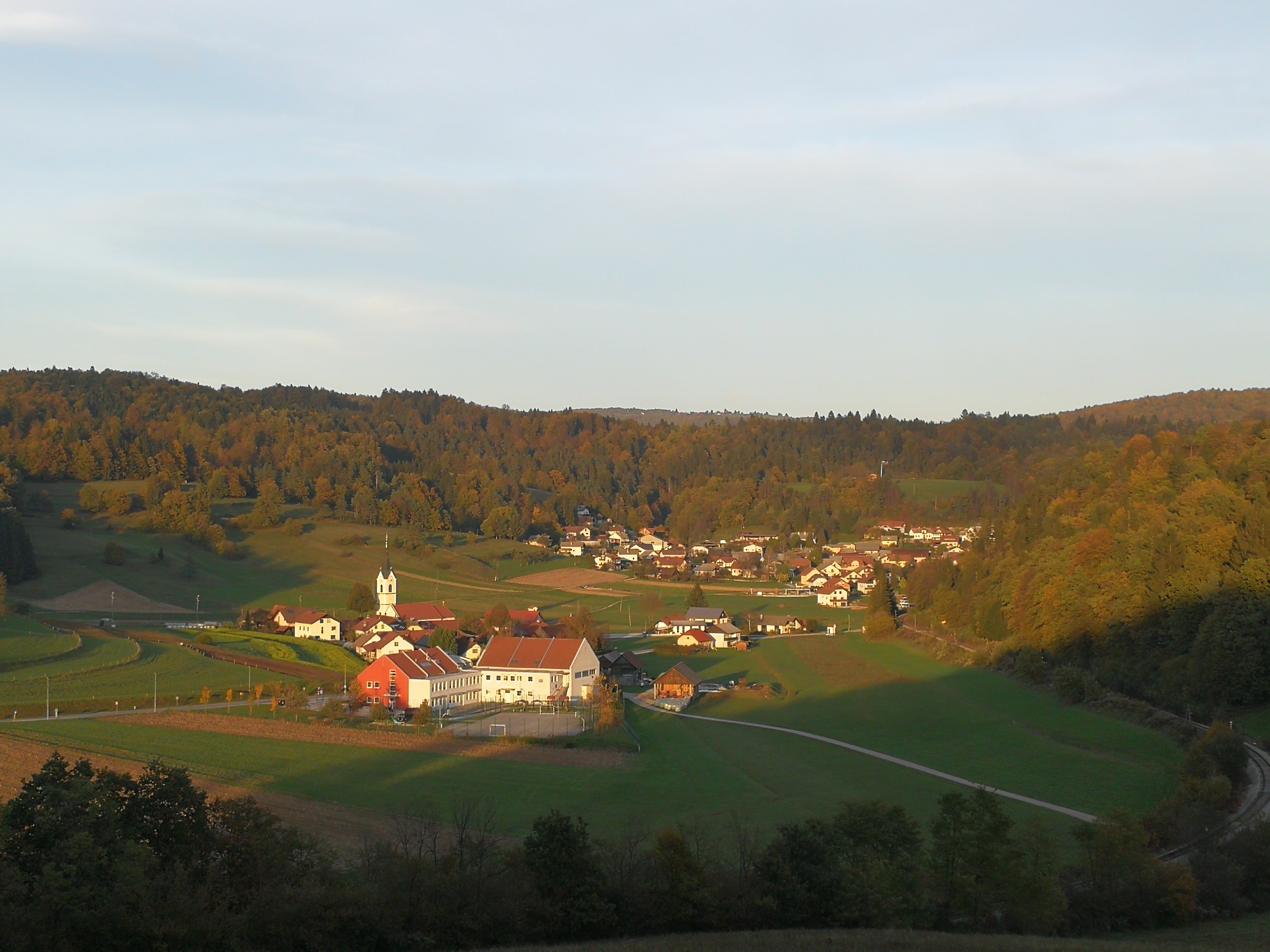

- Location in Slovenia
- Coordinates: 45°56′27.46″N 14°42′25.1″E
- Country: Slovenia
- Traditional region: Lower Carniola
- Statistical region: Central Slovenia
- Municipality: Grosuplje

Area
  - Total: 2.98 km^{2} (1.15 sq mi)
- Elevation: 335.3 m (1,100 ft)

Population (2002)
  - Total: 323

Žalna (pronounced [ˈʒaːlna]; in older sources also Žalina, German: Schalna) is a settlement in the Municipality of Grosuplje in central Slovenia. It lies southeast of Grosuplje in the historical region of Lower Carniola. The municipality is now included in the Central Slovenia Statistical Region. It includes the hamlets of Prevale, Velika Žalna (in older sources also Velika Žalina, German: Großschalna), and Mala Žalna (in older sources also Mala Žalina, German: Kleinschalna), as well as part of the hamlet of Na Šoli.

== Church ==
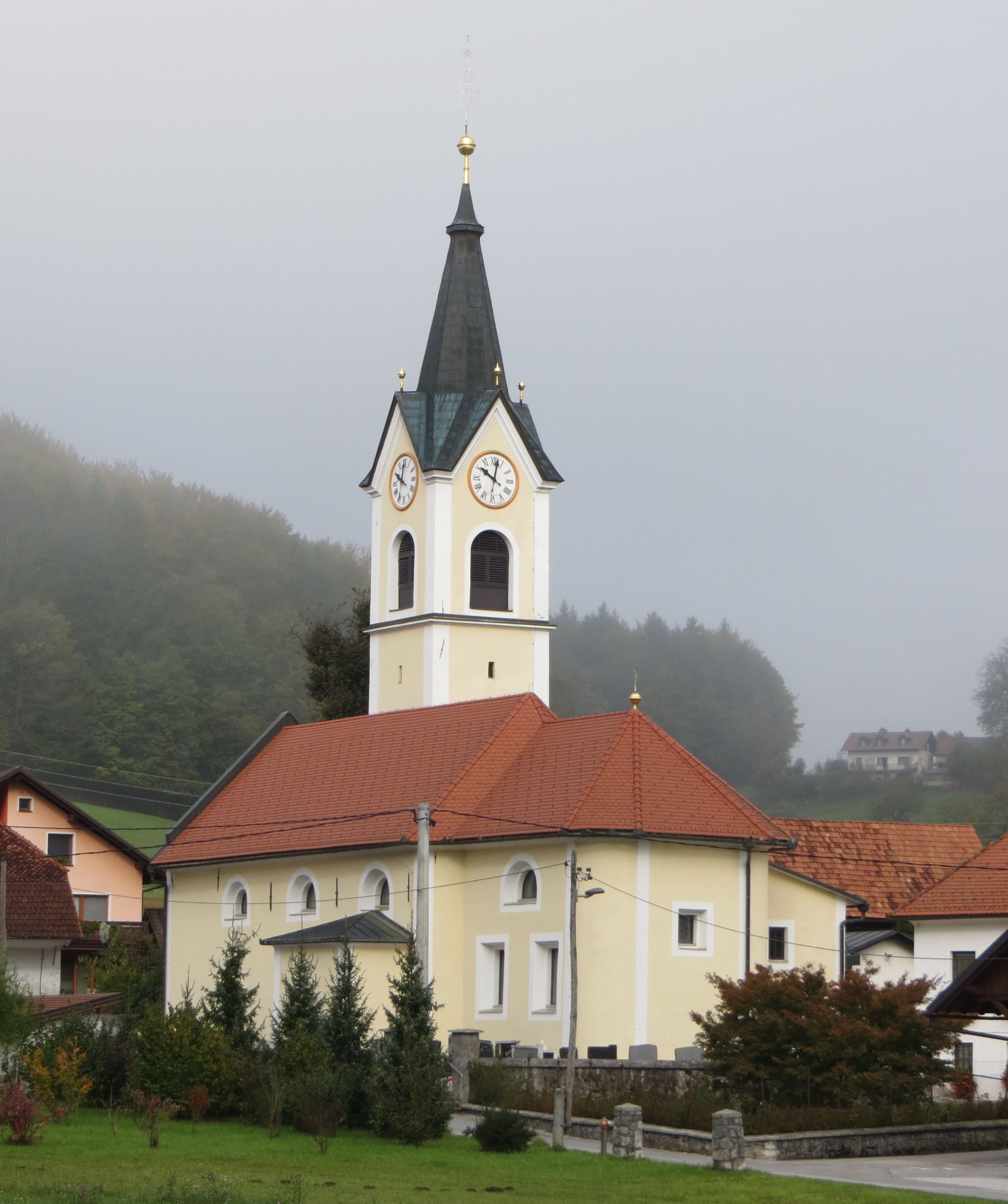
View from southeast

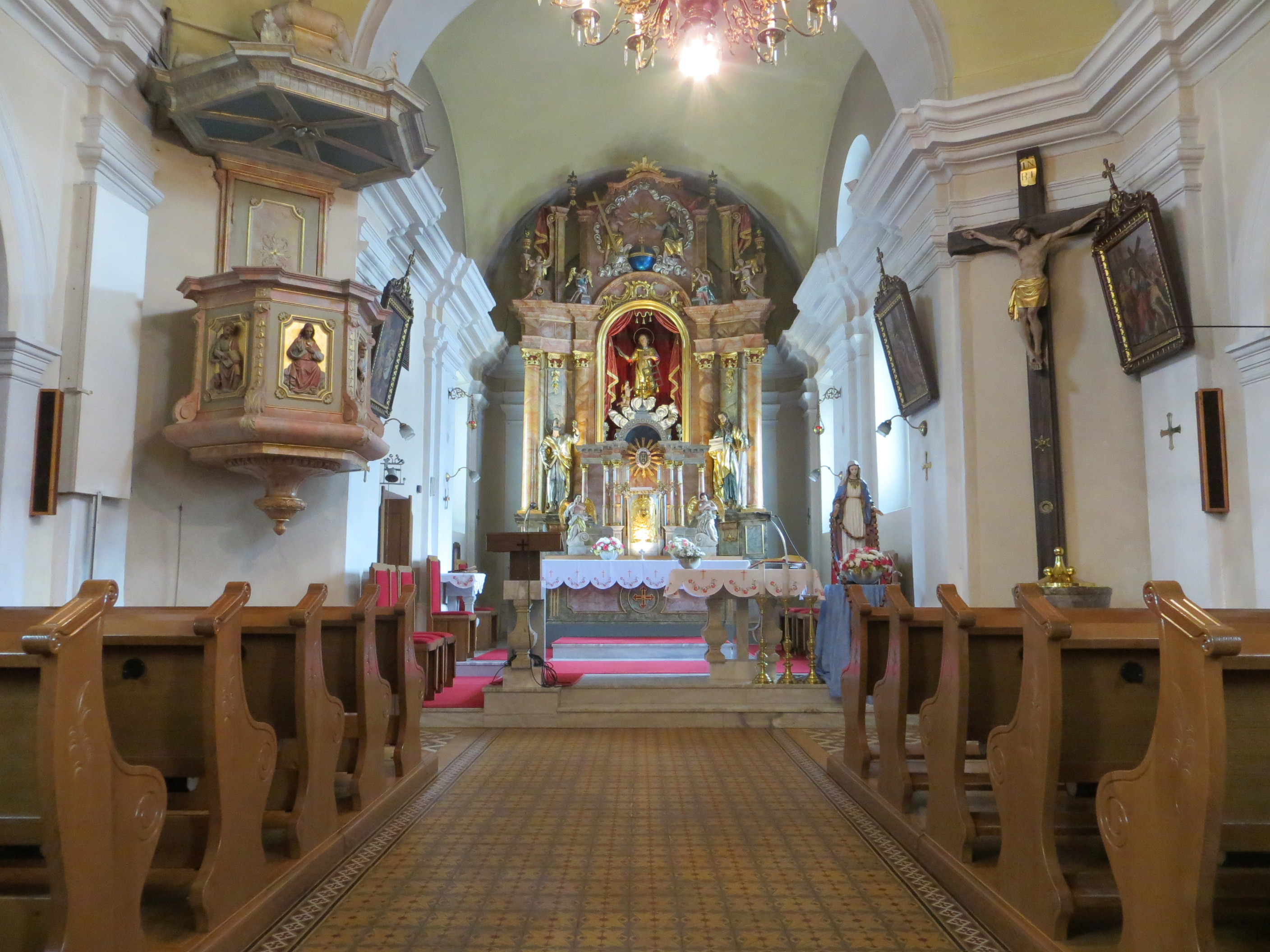
Interior

Saint Lawrence's Church

The parish church in the settlement is dedicated to Saint Lawrence and belongs to the Roman Catholic Archdiocese of Ljubljana. In dates to the 17th century with 18th- and 19th-century extensions.
