= Rožnik, Grosuplje =

Rožnik
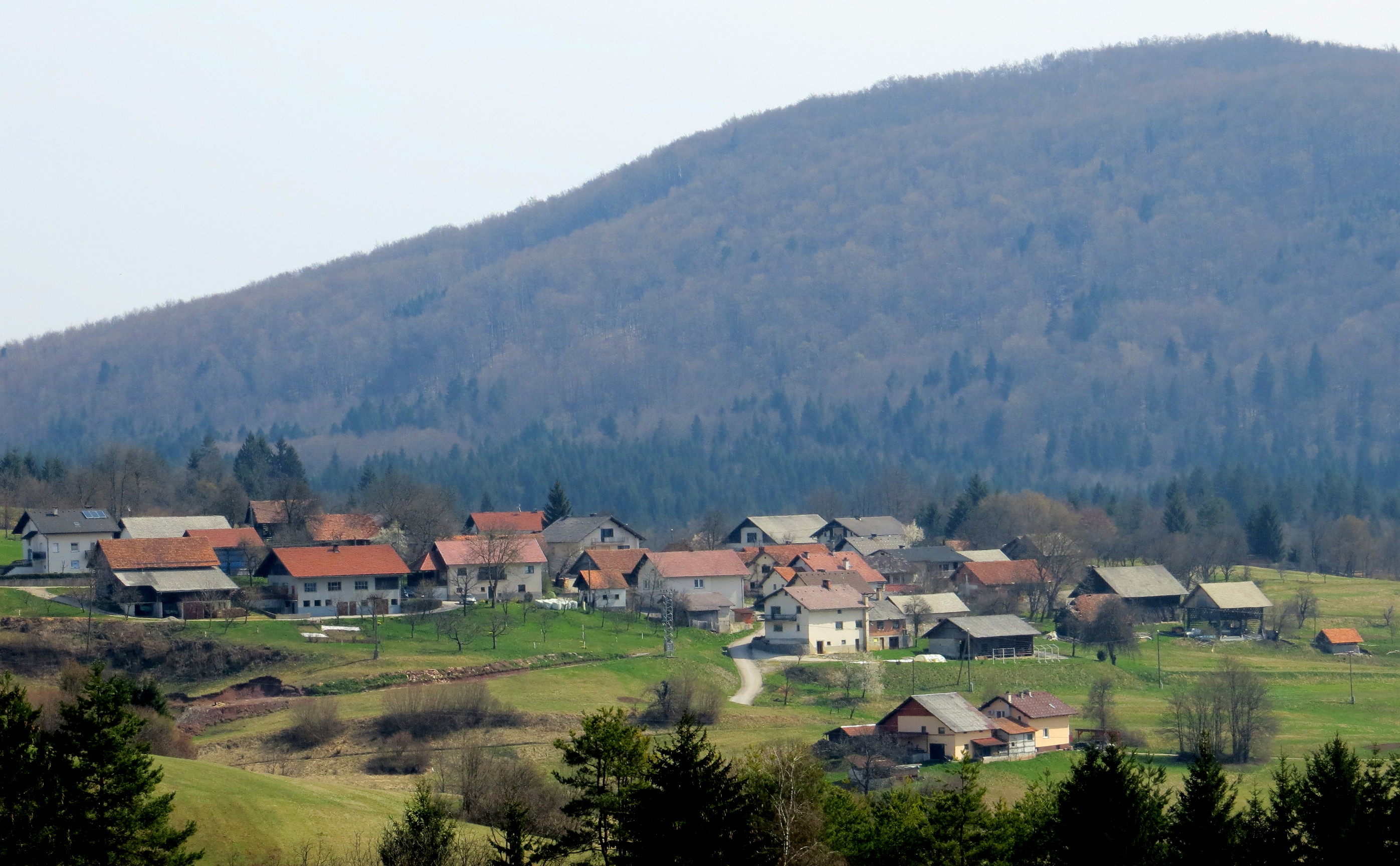

- Location in Slovenia
- Coordinates: 45°53′56.2″N 14°38′39.95″E
- Country: Slovenia
- Traditional region: Lower Carniola
- Statistical region: Central Slovenia
- Municipality: Grosuplje

Area
  - Total: 1.67 km^{2} (0.64 sq mi)
- Elevation: 461.7 m (1,515 ft)

Population (2002)
  - Total: 47

Rožnik (pronounced [ˈɾoːʒnik], locally also Roženpah, German: Rosenbach) is a small settlement in the Municipality of Grosuplje in central Slovenia. It lies east of Velike Lipljene just off the regional road leading south from Šent Jurij to Turjak. The area is part of the historical region of Lower Carniola. The municipality is now included in the Central Slovenia Statistical Region.

== Gallery ==
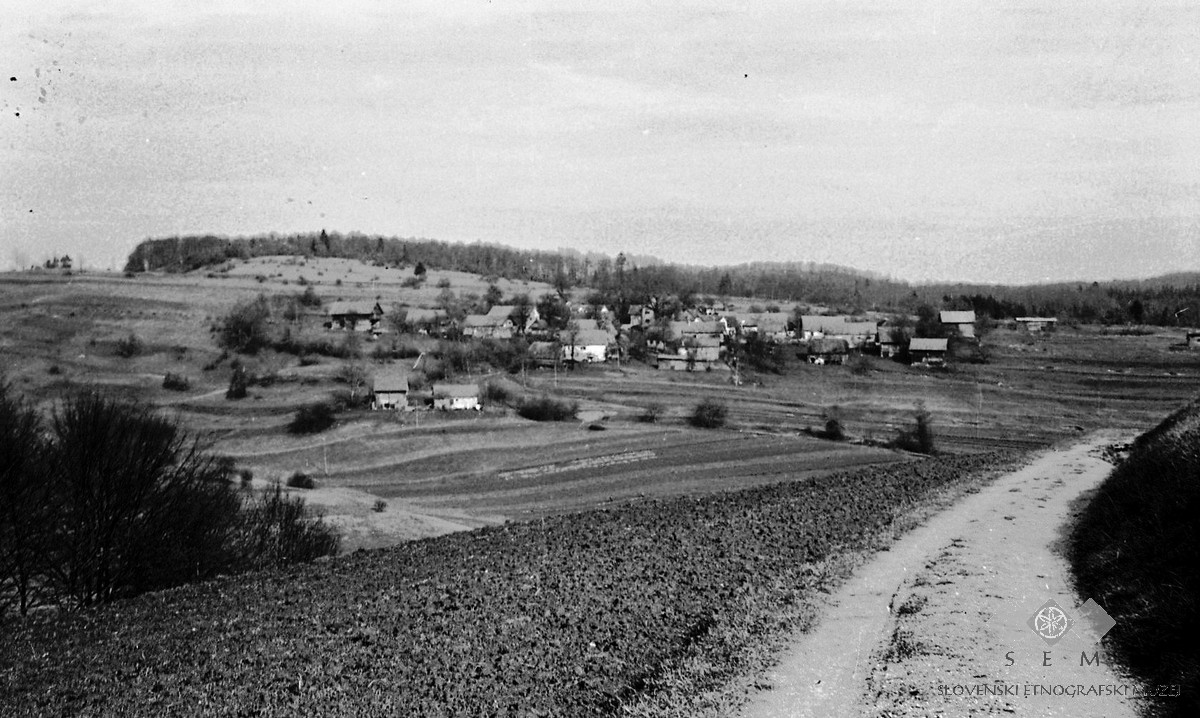
Rožnik in 1948
