= Ponova Vas =

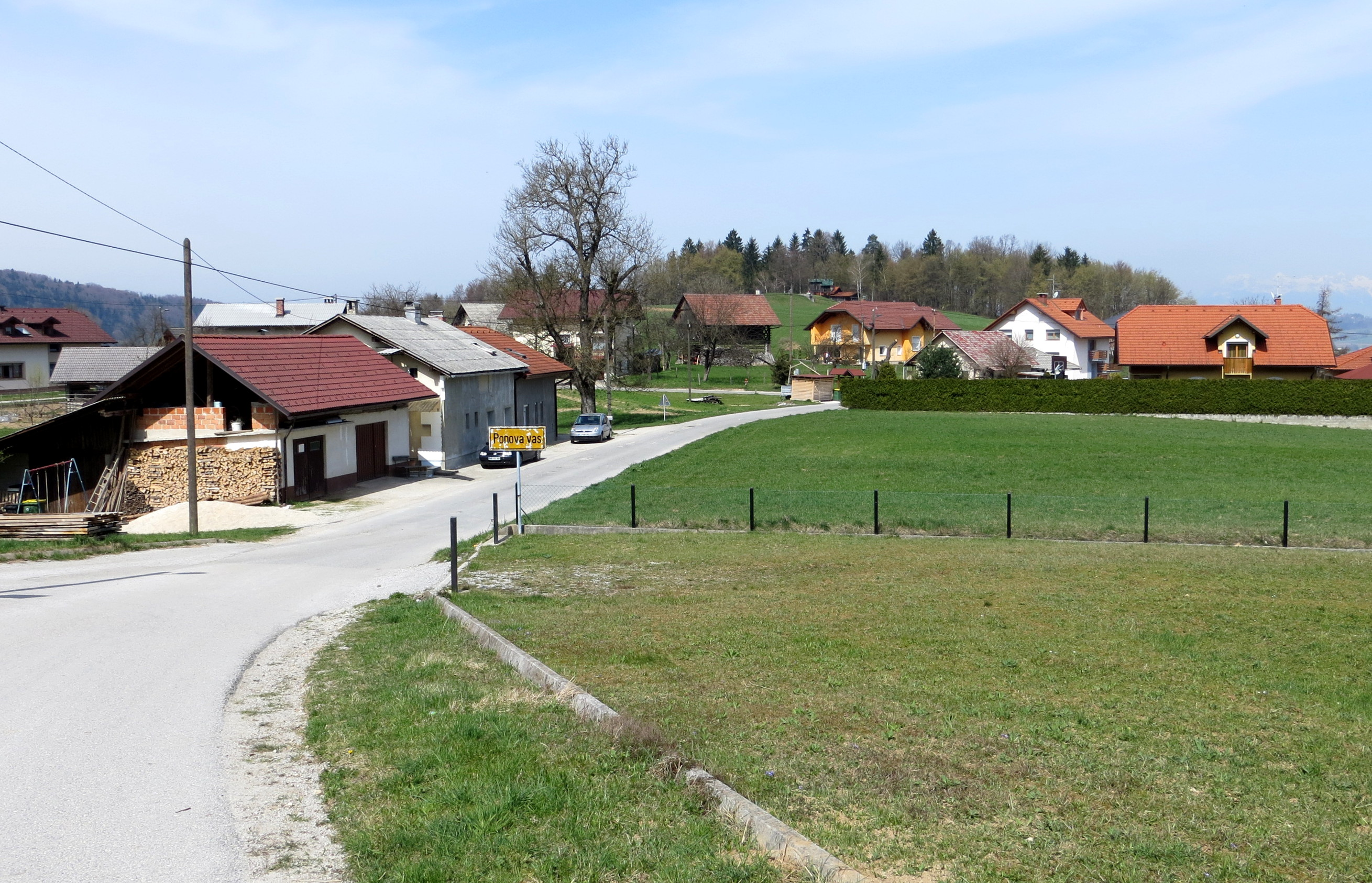

- Location in Slovenia
- Coordinates: 45°56′23.11″N 14°37′53.51″E
- Country: Slovenia
- Traditional region: Lower Carniola
- Statistical region: Central Slovenia
- Municipality: Grosuplje

Area
  - Total: 3.37 km^{2} (1.30 sq mi)
- Elevation: 333.4 m (1,094 ft)

Population (2002)
  - Total: 441

Ponova Vas (pronounced [pɔˈnɔːʋa ˈʋaːs] or [pɔˈnoːʋa ˈʋaːs]; Slovene: Ponova vas, German: Pöndorf) is a village southwest of Grosuplje in central Slovenia. The area is part of the historical region of Lower Carniola. The Municipality of Grosuplje is included in the Central Slovenia Statistical Region. The settlement includes the hamlets of Čemetija, Benat, and Kobiljek.

== Name ==
Ponova Vas was attested in written sources in 1436 as Penndorff (and as Ponoua vaſs in 1686, Pondorff in 1688, and Panoua vaſs in 1720). In the past the German name was Pöndorf. In the local dialect, the name is pronounced Panova vas. The morphology of the name indicates that it is a possessive form of a personal name, perhaps Old High German Pono or Bono, thus meaning 'Pono's village' or 'Bono's village'. Derivations from *(Žu)panova vьsь 'mayor's village' and from the Italian personal name Beno have been rejected for accentual reasons.

== Notable people ==
Notable people that were born or lived in Ponova Vas include:

- Josip Perme (1874–1940), mayor of Šent Jurij and discoverer of Mayor Cave (Slovene: Županova jama) in Cerovo
