= Udje =

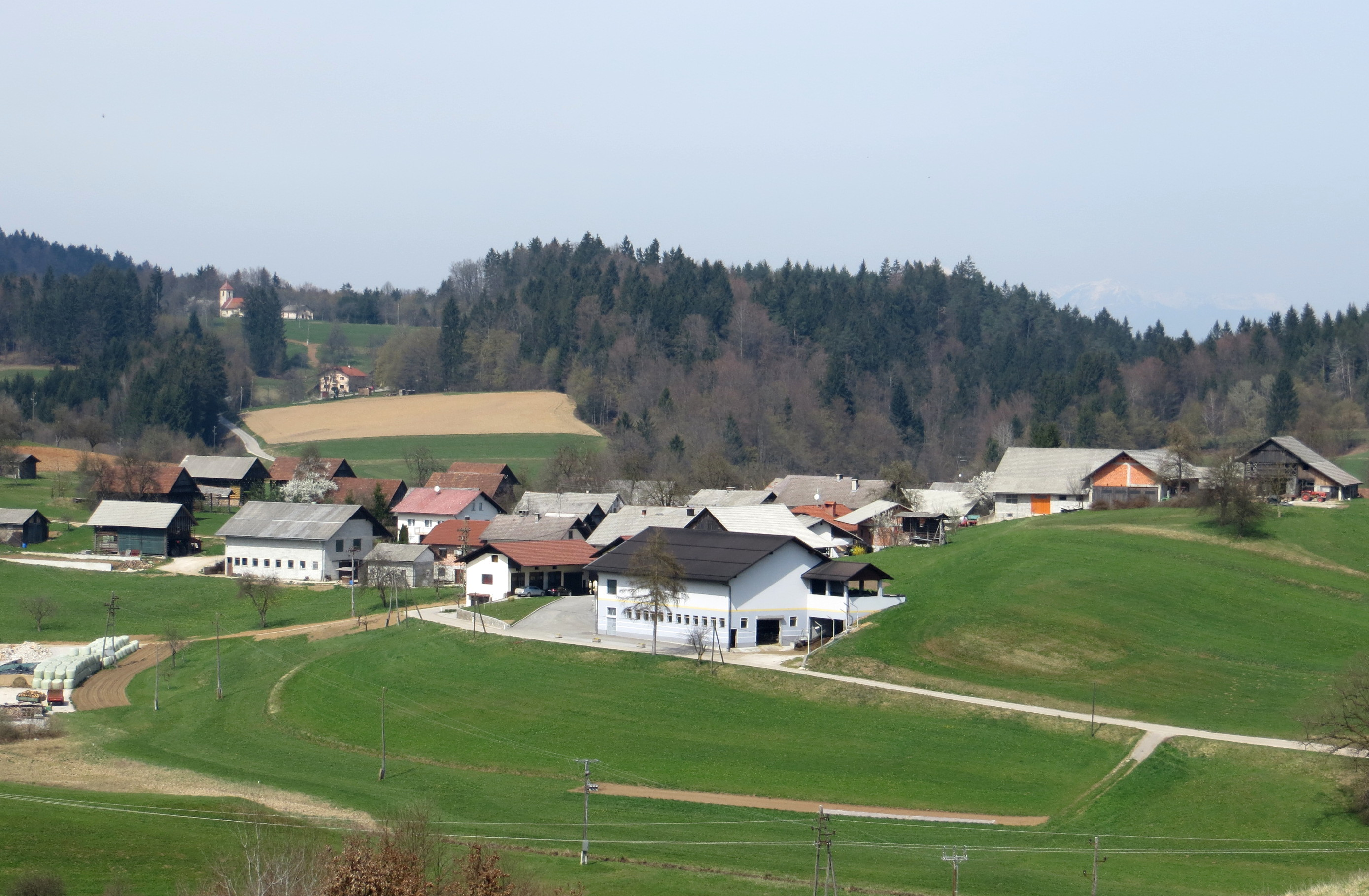

- Location in Slovenia
- Coordinates: 45°55′31.29″N 14°36′18.7″E
- Country: Slovenia
- Traditional region: Lower Carniola
- Statistical region: Central Slovenia
- Municipality: Grosuplje

Area
  - Total: 2.06 km^{2} (0.80 sq mi)
- Elevation: 364.7 m (1,197 ft)

Population (2002)
  - Total: 60

Udje (pronounced [ˈuːdjɛ]) is a small settlement west of Šent Jurij in the Municipality of Grosuplje in central Slovenia. The area is part of the historical region of Lower Carniola. The municipality is now included in the Central Slovenia Statistical Region.

A hoard of Bronze Age tools and weapons was discovered near the settlement.
