= Velike Lipljene =

- Village
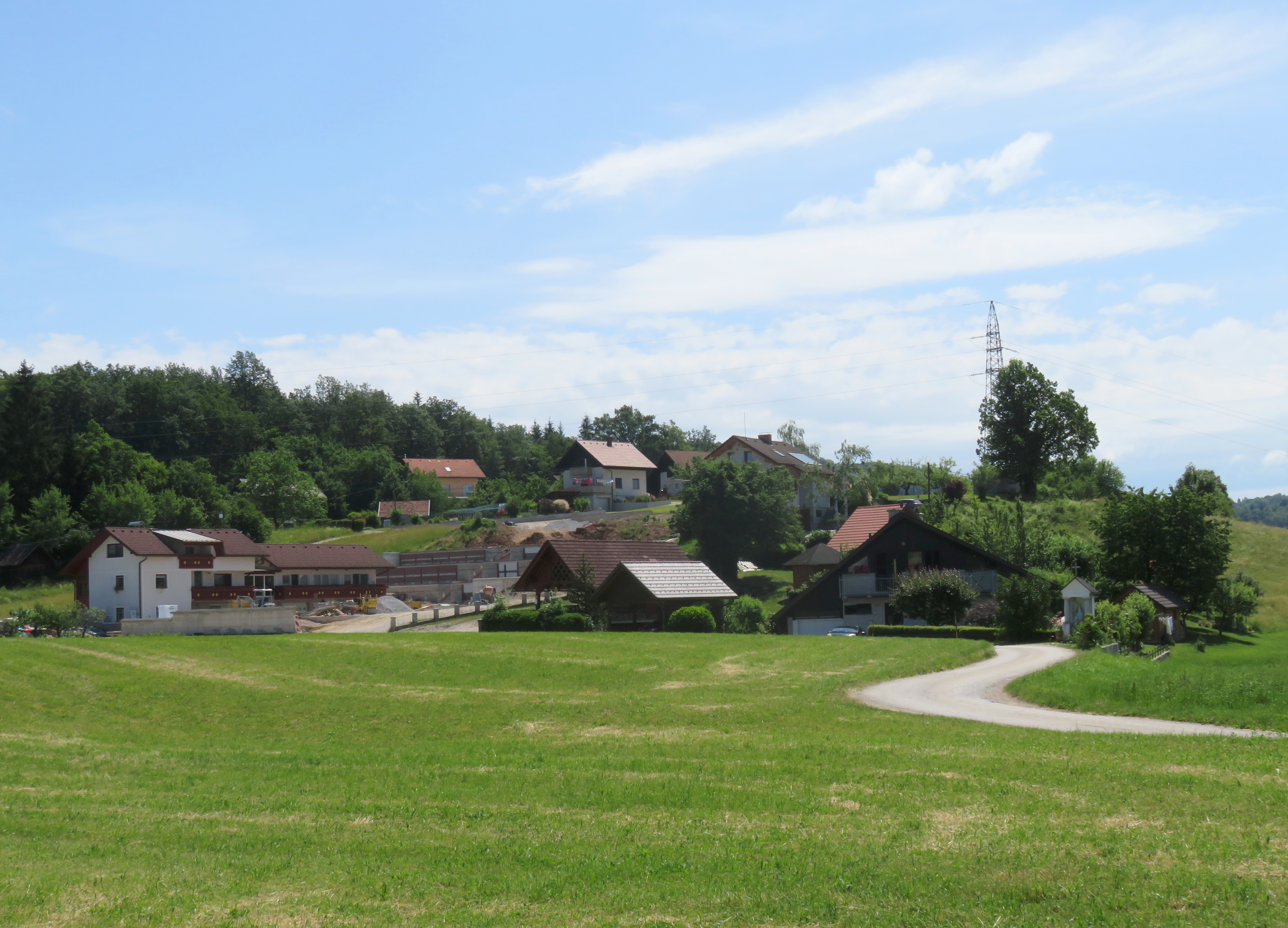

- Location in Slovenia
- Coordinates: 45°54′14.58″N 14°38′15.24″E
- Country: Slovenia
- Traditional region: Lower Carniola
- Statistical region: Central Slovenia
- Municipality: Grosuplje

Area
  - Total: 2.8 km^{2} (1.1 sq mi)
- Elevation: 485.4 m (1,593 ft)

Population (2002)
  - Total: 114

Velike Lipljene (pronounced [ˈʋeːlikɛ ˈliːpljɛnɛ]; German: Großliplein) is a settlement in the Municipality of Grosuplje in central Slovenia. It lies in the hills south of Grosuplje on the road from Šent Jurij to Turjak. The area is part of the historical region of Lower Carniola. The municipality is now included in the Central Slovenia Statistical Region.

== Cultural heritage ==
Part of a Roman period burial ground has been discovered near the settlement.

== Attractions ==
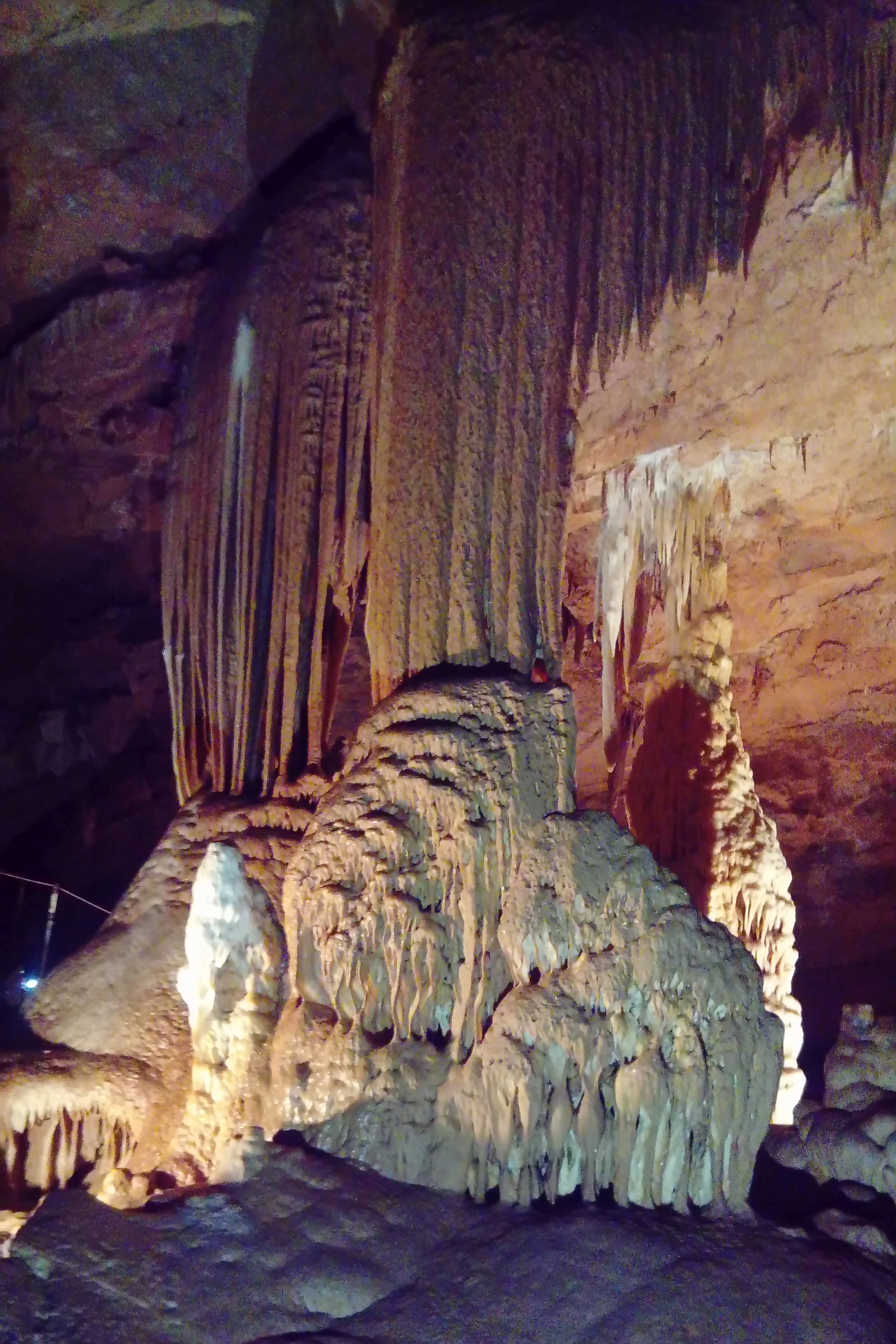
Mayor Cave: King Matthias's Throne

Mayor Cave (Županova jama) is located on the northern edge of the settlement's territory. It was discovered by the local mayor, Josip Perme (1874–1940), in 1926. Perme was a member of the Yugoslav Radical Union and Slovene People's Party, both of which were banned by the Communist Party of Yugoslavia after the Second World War. It was opened as a show cave in 1927 and outfitted with electric lights after the Second World War.

The cave was originally known as Županova Permetova jama 'Mayor Perme Cave'. The name Taborska jama 'Tabor Cave' was introduced after the Second World War, in 1946. That name is still encountered today, and it is derived from Tabor Hill (493 m), which stands about 1 kilometer (0.62 mi) north of the cave.

== Mass grave ==
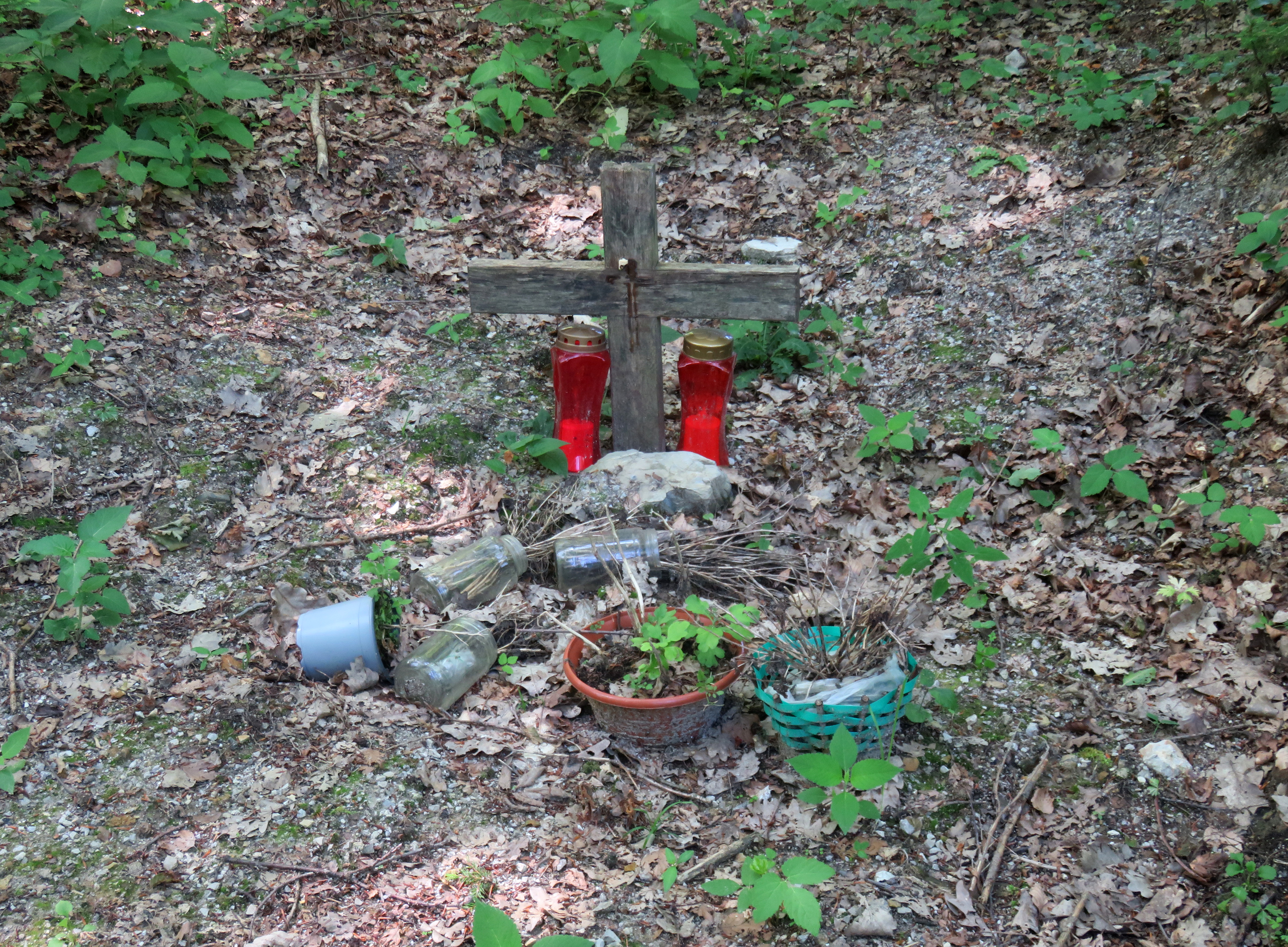
Velike Lipljene Mass Grave

Velike Lipljene is the site of a mass grave associated with the Second World War. The Velike Lipljene Mass Grave (Slovene: Grobišče Velike Lipljene) is located on the west side of the village on the slope of Medvejca Hill. It contains the remains of undetermined victims.

== Gallery ==
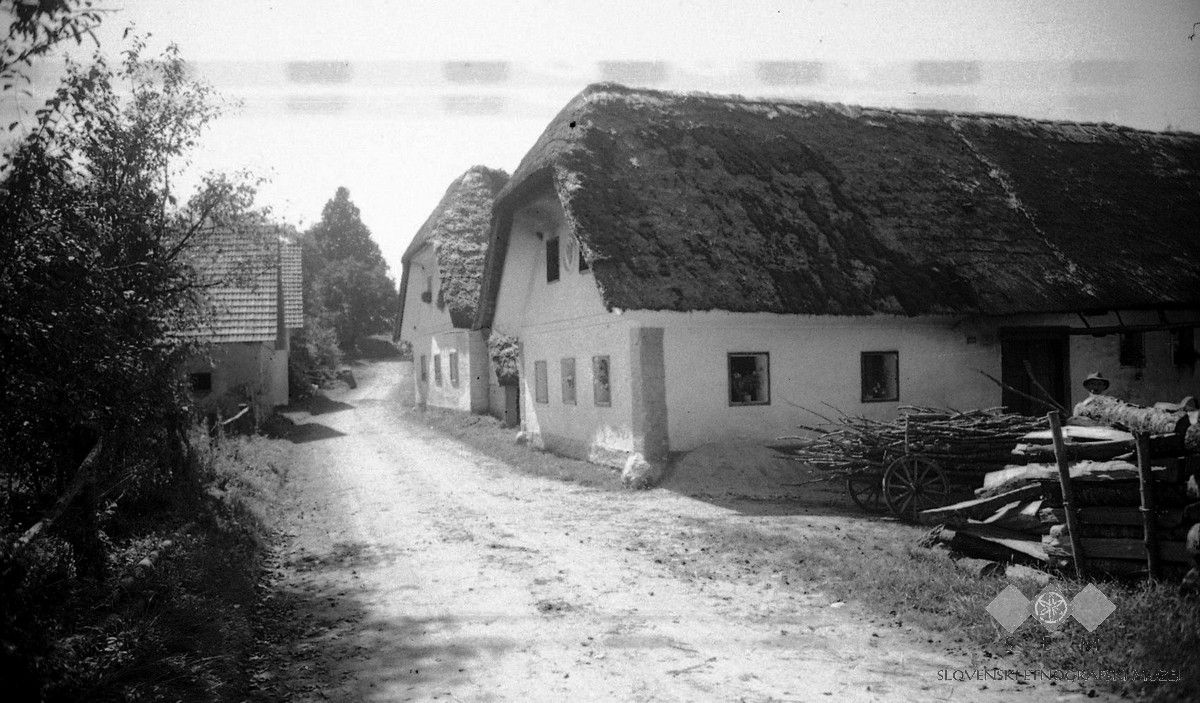
Velike Lipljene in 1948
