= Sloka =

Sloka may refer to:

- Sloka, Latvia, a neighbourhood of Jūrmala, Latvia
- Sloka meter, a Sanskrit meter
- Śloka, a Hindu prayer
- Sloka Gora, a small settlement in central Slovenia
