= Rožnik =

Rožnik may refer to several places in Slovenia:

- Rožnik District, a district of Ljubljana
- Rožnik, Grosuplje, a settlement in the Municipality of Grosuplje
- Rožnik (hill), a hill in Ljubljana
