= Sloka Gora =

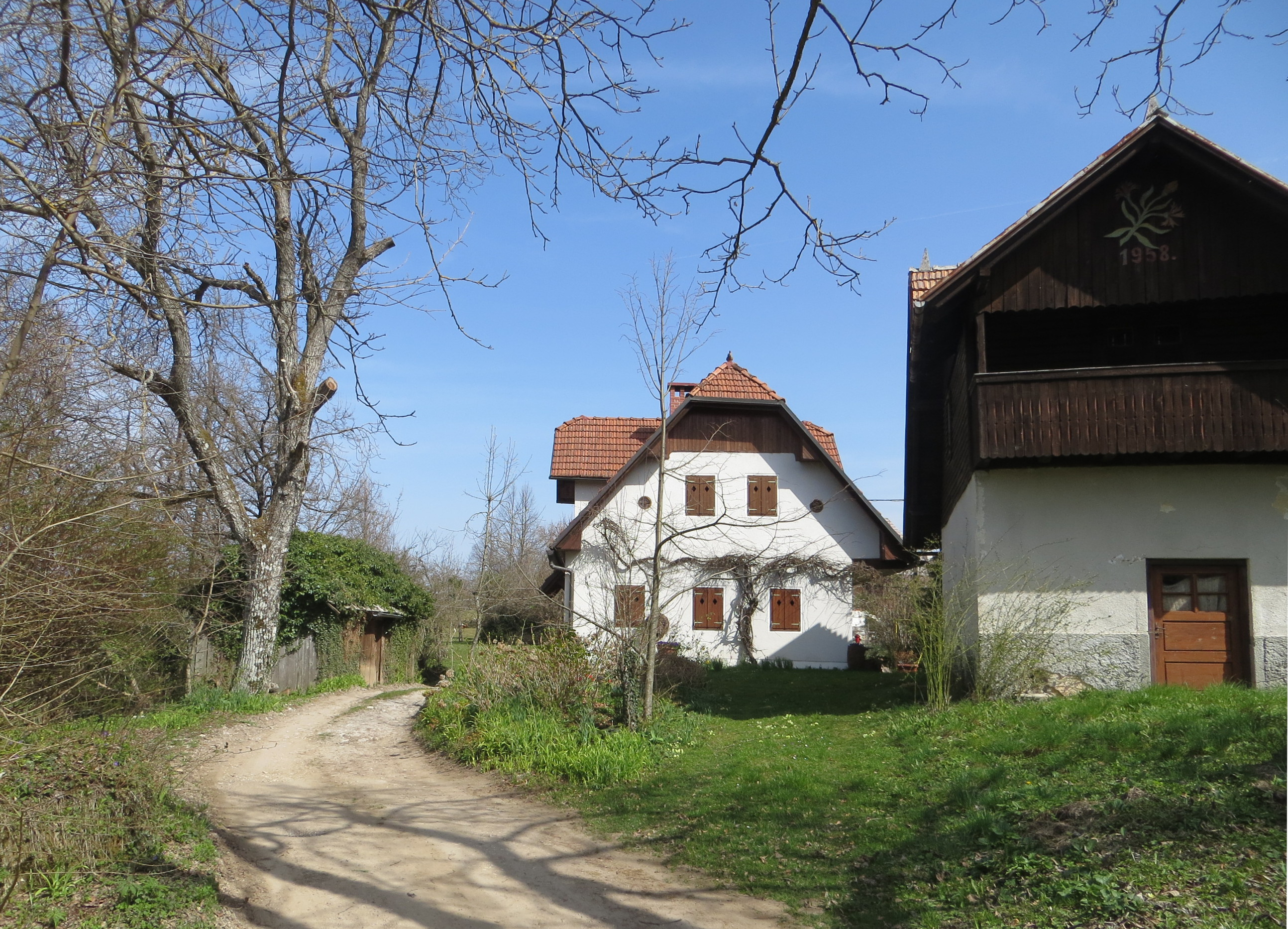

- Location in Slovenia
- Coordinates: 45°53′32.62″N 14°37′19.84″E
- Country: Slovenia
- Traditional region: Lower Carniola
- Statistical region: Central Slovenia
- Municipality: Velike Lašče

Area
  - Total: 1.26 km^{2} (0.49 sq mi)
- Elevation: 631.7 m (2,073 ft)

Population (2002)
  - Total: 10
- Postal code: 1311

Sloka Gora (pronounced [ˈsloːka ˈɡɔːɾa]) is a small settlement north of Turjak in the Municipality of Velike Lašče in central Slovenia. The entire municipality is part of the traditional region of Lower Carniola and is now included in the Central Slovenia Statistical Region.

A small, relatively well preserved Early Iron Age hill fort with visible earthworks and settlement terraces can be seen near the settlement.
