= Cerovo, Grosuplje =

Cerovo
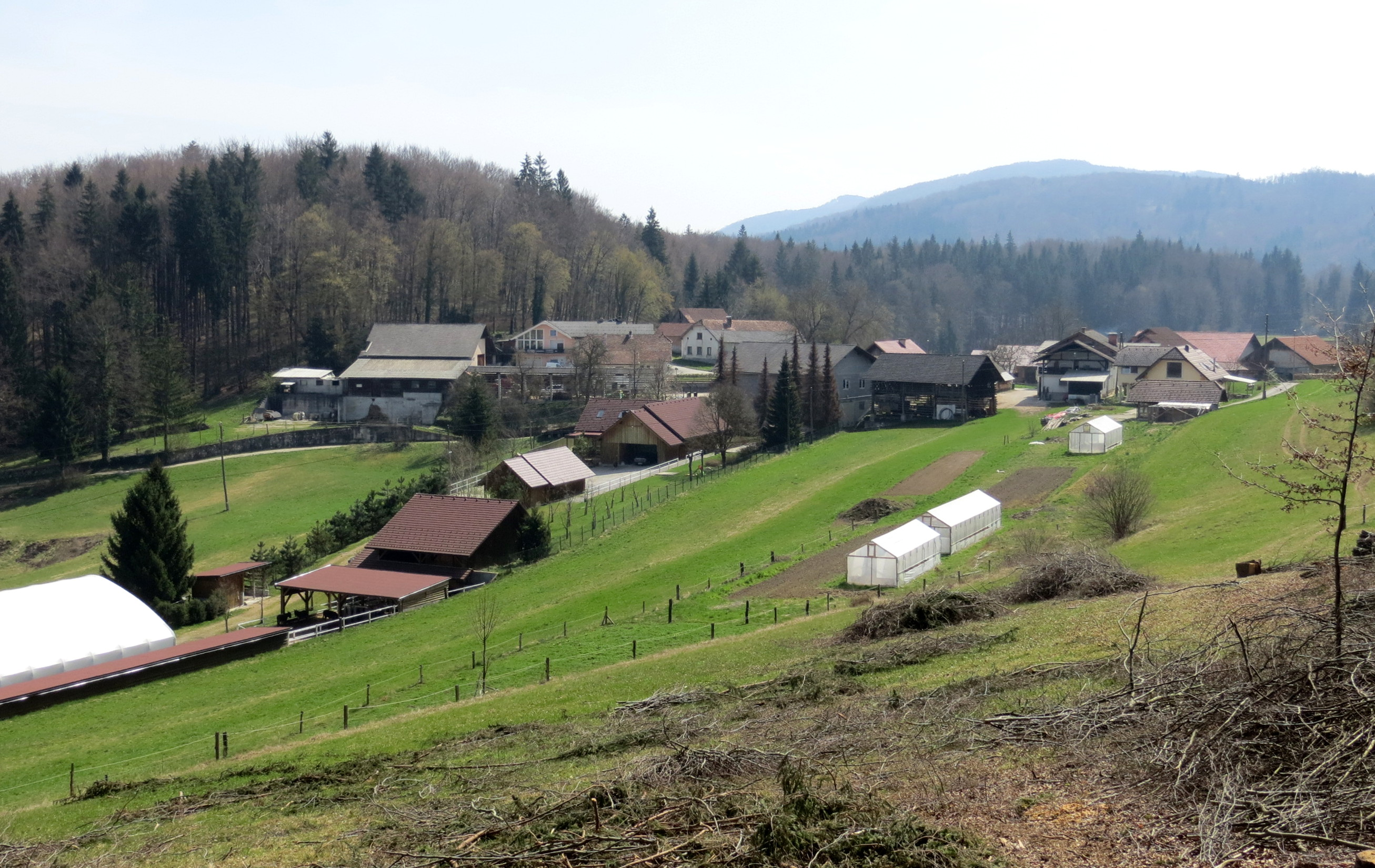

- Location in Slovenia
- Coordinates: 45°55′25.9″N 14°38′31.95″E
- Country: Slovenia
- Traditional region: Lower Carniola
- Statistical region: Central Slovenia
- Municipality: Grosuplje

Area
  - Total: 2.47 km^{2} (0.95 sq mi)
- Elevation: 377.2 m (1,238 ft)

Population (2002)
  - Total: 33

Cerovo (pronounced [tsɛˈɾɔːʋɔ] or [tsɛˈɾoːʋɔ]; German: Zerou) is a small settlement in the Municipality of Grosuplje in central Slovenia. It lies in the hills south of Grosuplje in the historical region of Lower Carniola. The municipality is now included in the Central Slovenia Statistical Region.

== Mass grave ==
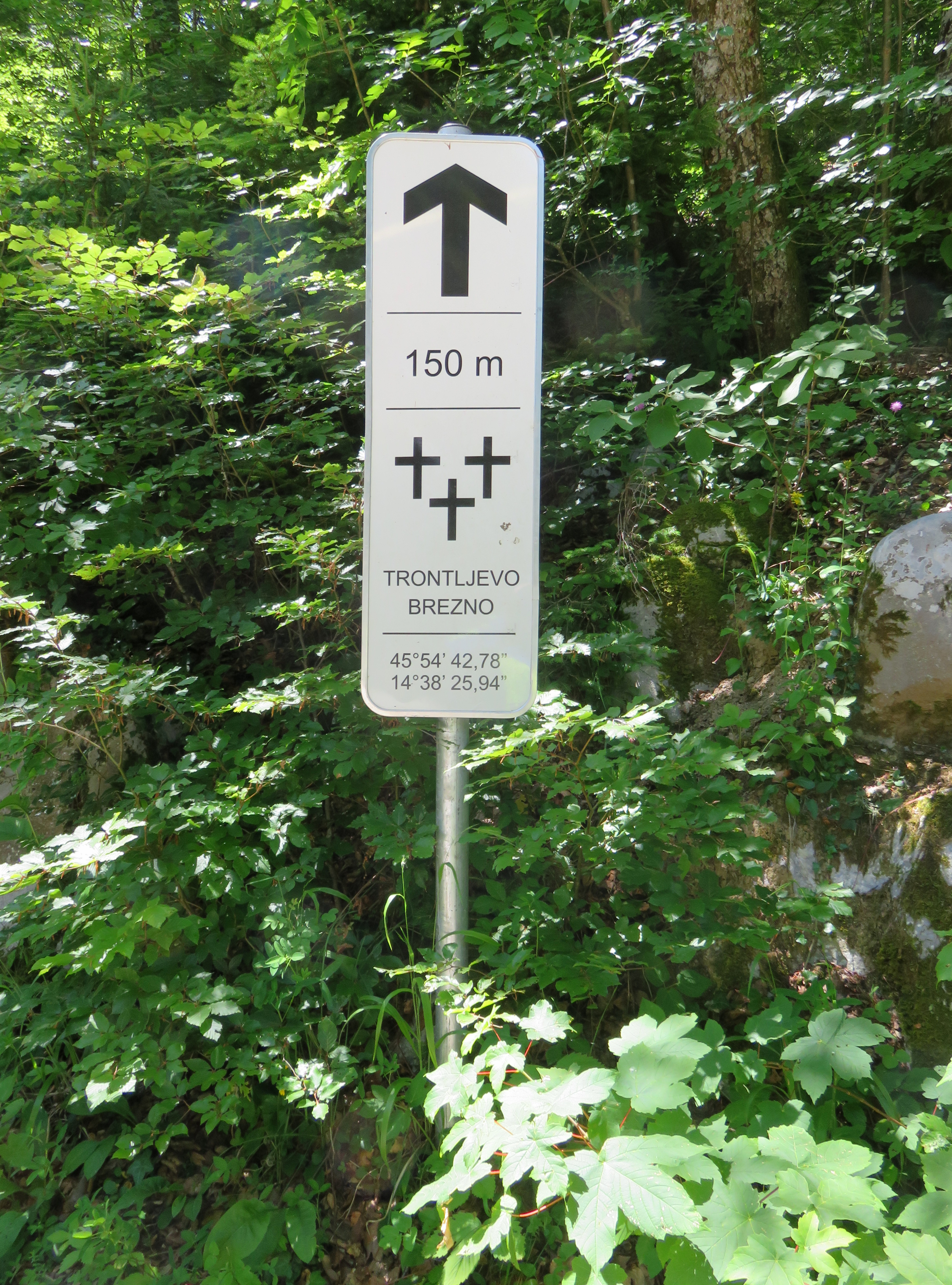
Sign for the Trontelj Shaft Mass Grave

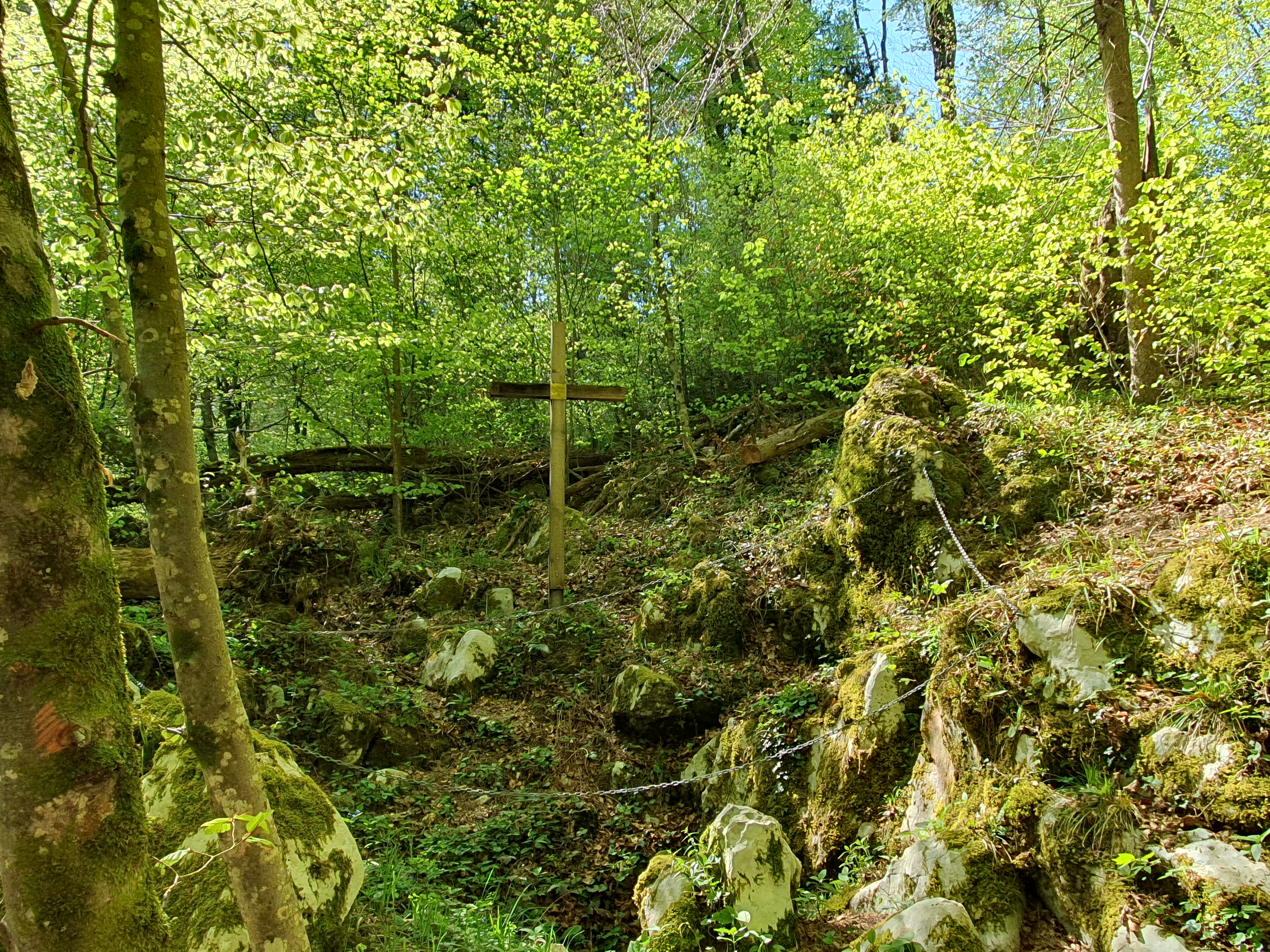
The Trontelj Shaft Mass Grave

Cerovo is the site of a mass grave associated with the Second World War. The Trontelj Shaft Mass Grave (Slovene: Grobišče Trontljevo brezno) is located south of Cerovo, about 130 m southeast of Mayor Cave (Županova jama), also known as Tabor Cave (Taborska jama). It contains the remains of unidentified victims.

== Church ==
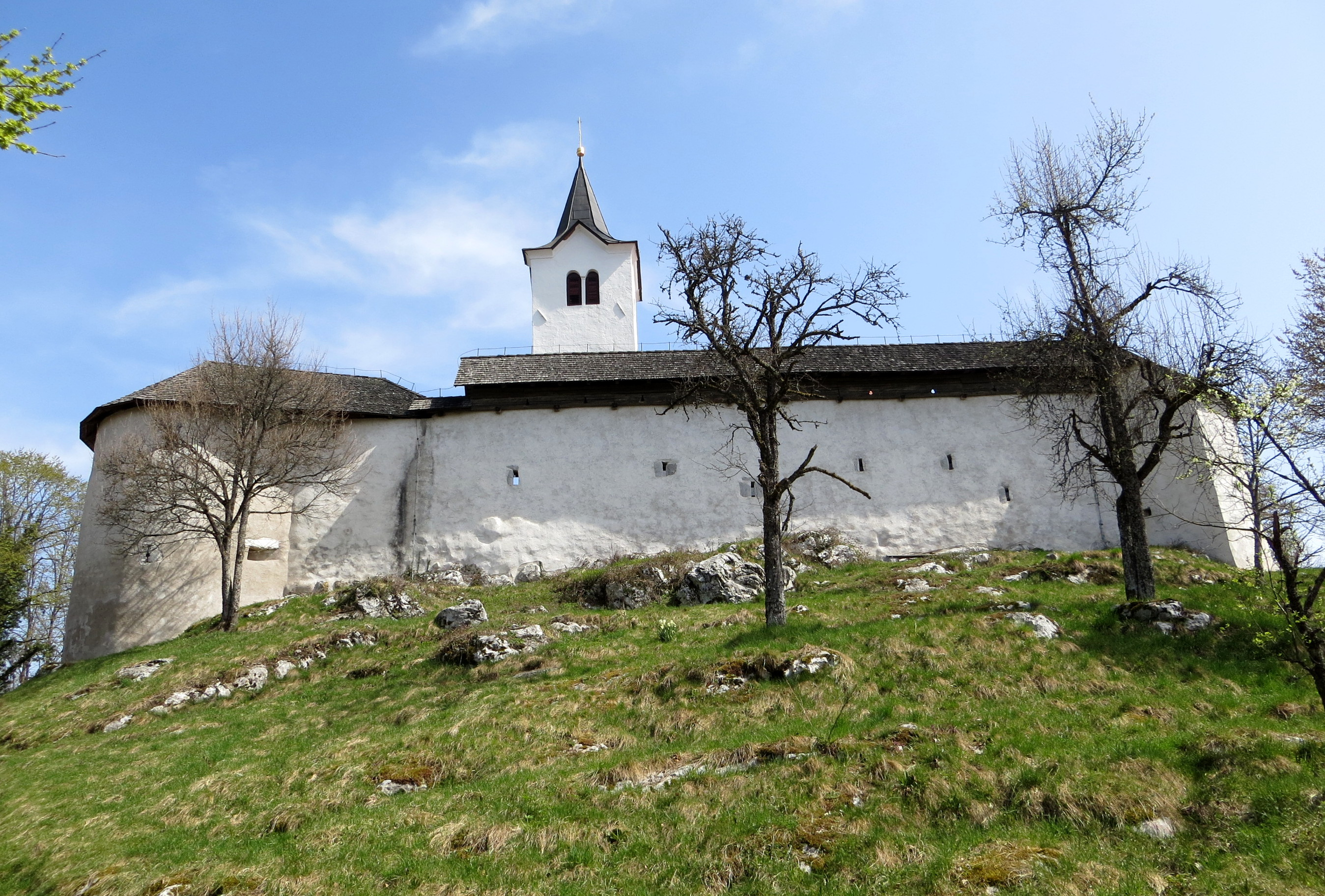
Saint Nicholas's Church

The local church, built in an isolated location south of the settlement, is dedicated to Saint Nicholas and belongs to the Parish of Št. Jurij pri Grosupljem. In its core it is a 13th-century Romanesque building that was restyled in the Baroque. It has a well-preserved late 15th-century defence wall, built as a refuge against Ottoman raids.
