= Turjak =

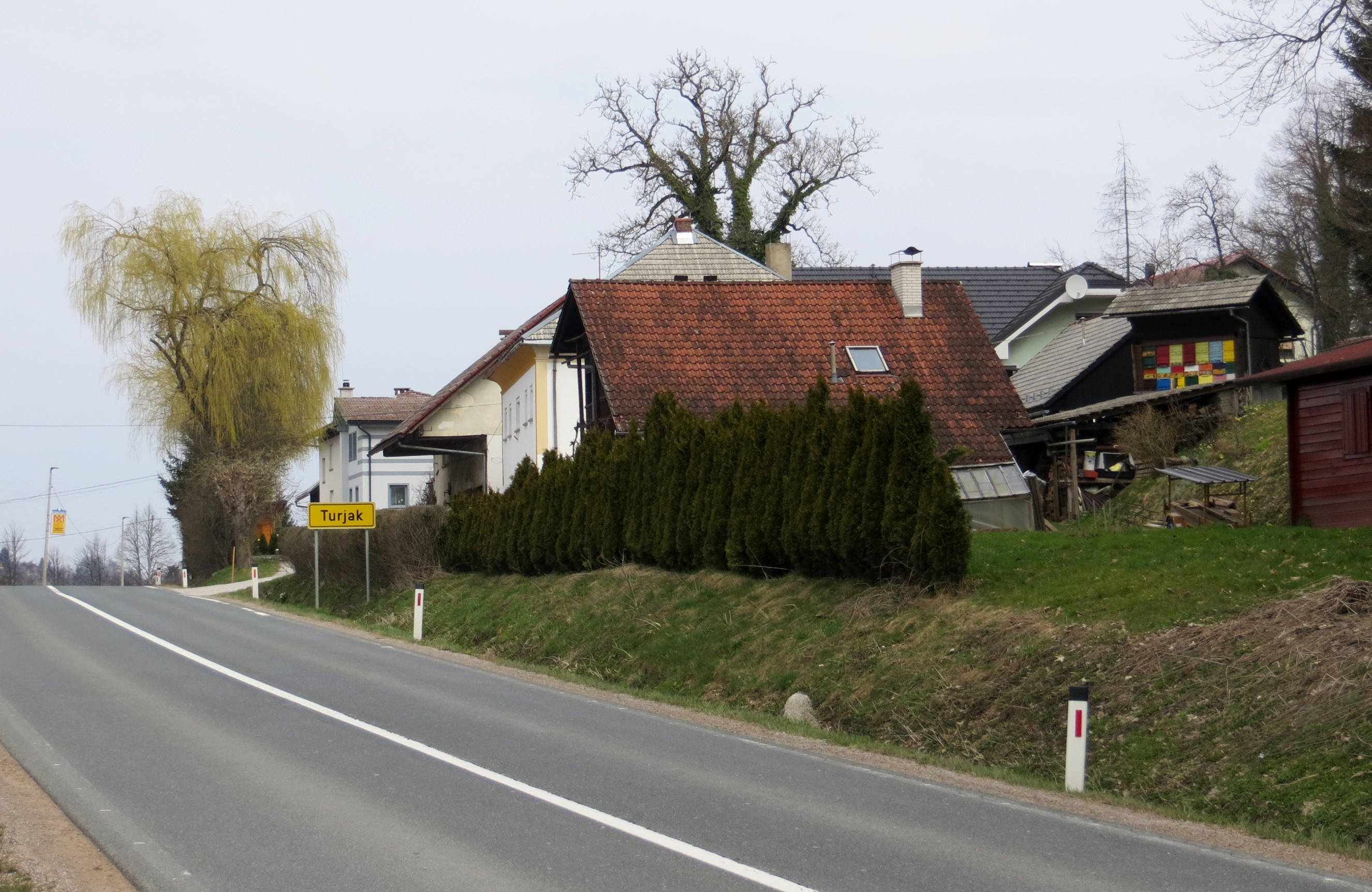

- Location in Slovenia
- Coordinates: 45°52′40.96″N 14°36′35.21″E
- Country: Slovenia
- Traditional region: Lower Carniola
- Statistical region: Central Slovenia
- Municipality: Velike Lašče

Area
  - Total: 2.3 km^{2} (0.89 sq mi)
- Elevation: 519.5 m (1,704 ft)

Population (2018)
  - Total: 205
- Postal code: 1311

Turjak (pronounced [tuˈɾjaːk]; German: Auersperg) is a settlement in the Municipality of Velike Lašče in central Slovenia. The entire municipality is part of the traditional region of Lower Carniola and is now included in the Central Slovenia Statistical Region.

== Castles ==
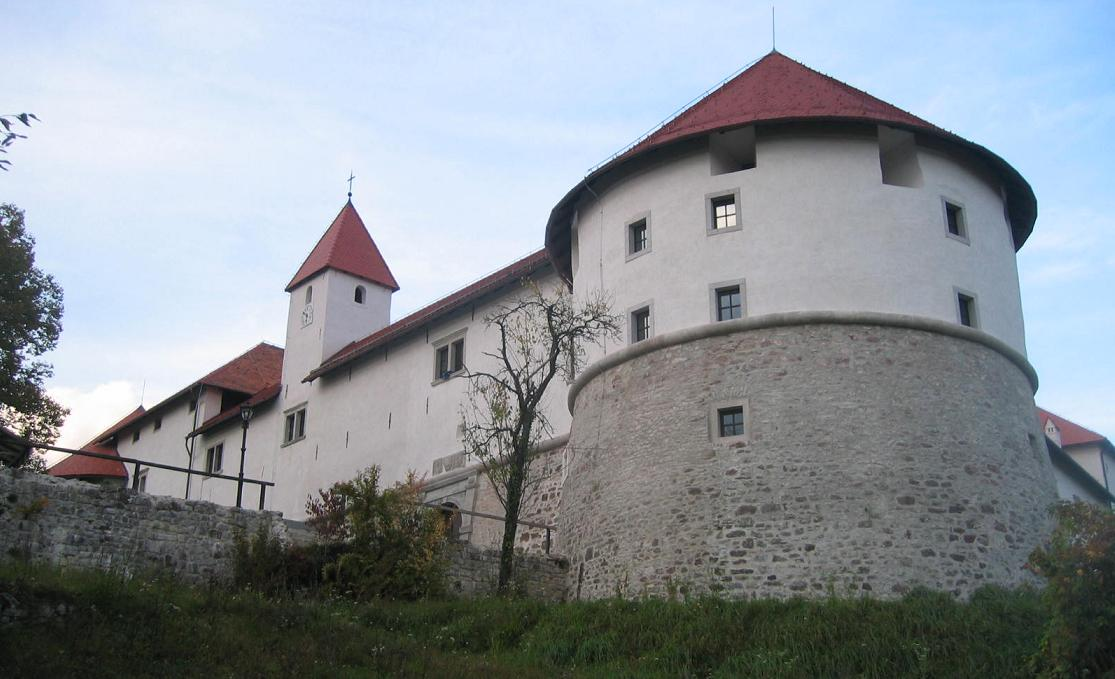
Turjak Castle

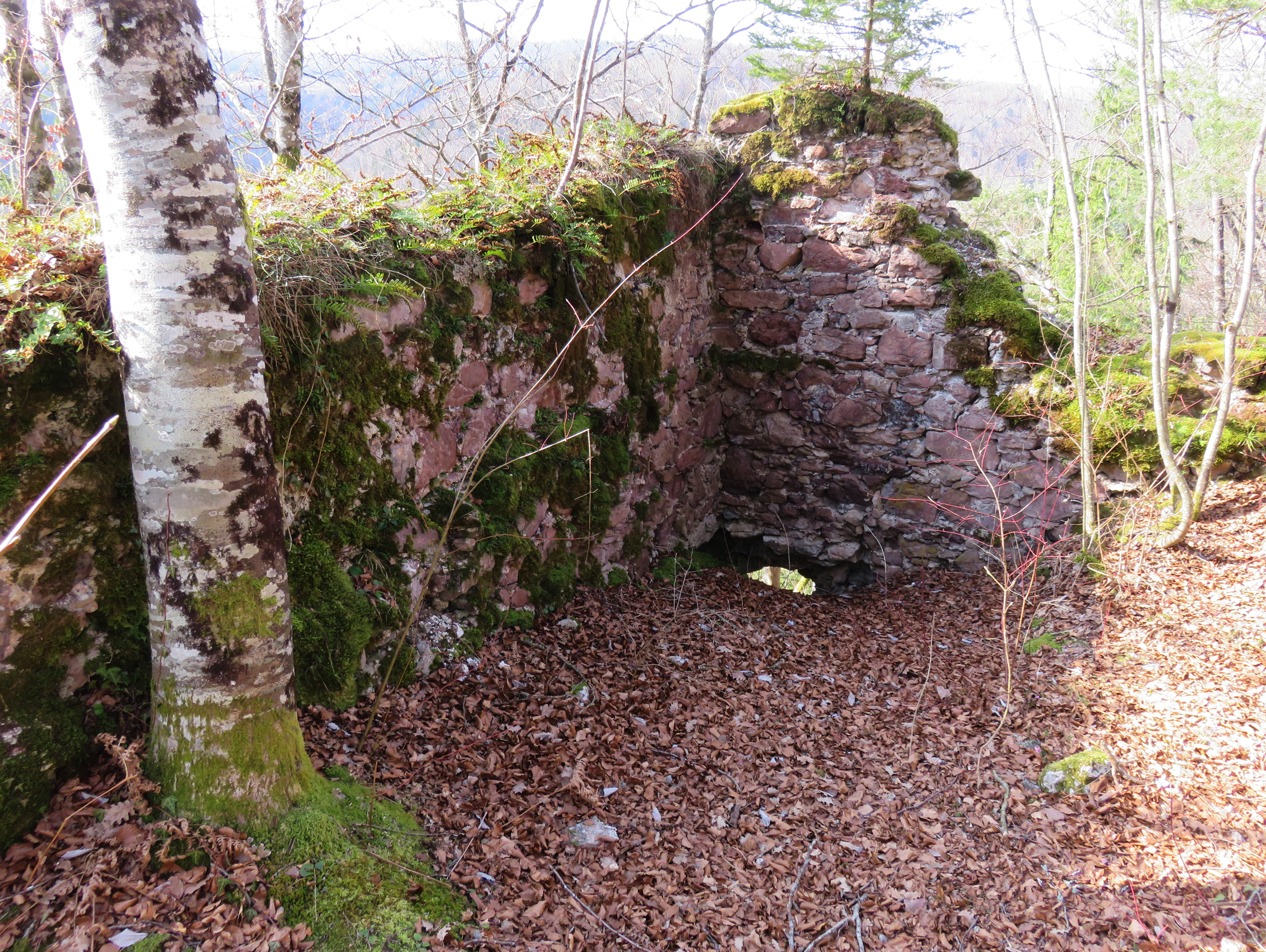
Ruins of Old Turjak Castle

Turjak is best known as the location of Turjak Castle, a large 13th-century castle, greatly rebuilt in the early 16th century, one of the best-known and best-preserved castles in all of Carniola.

The ruins of a smaller and older castle known as stari grad Turjak 'Old Turjak Castle' stand on a rocky promontory above the Želimlje Valley. It was probably built by the end of the 11th century and was the original residence of the Auersperg family, predating the better-known castle just to the southeast.

== Gallery ==
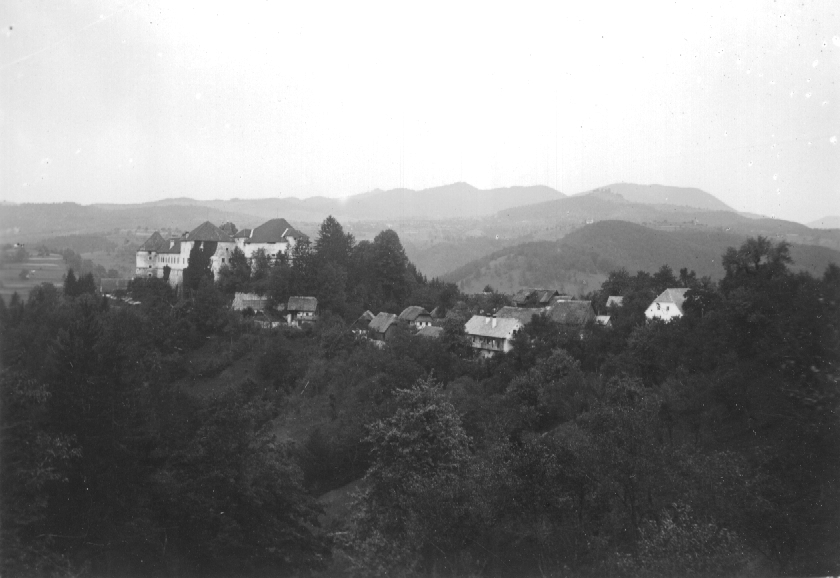
Turjak in 1907
