= Šent Jurij =

Šent Jurij Sveti Jurij pri Grosupljem (until 1952), Podtabor pri Grosupljem (1952–1992)
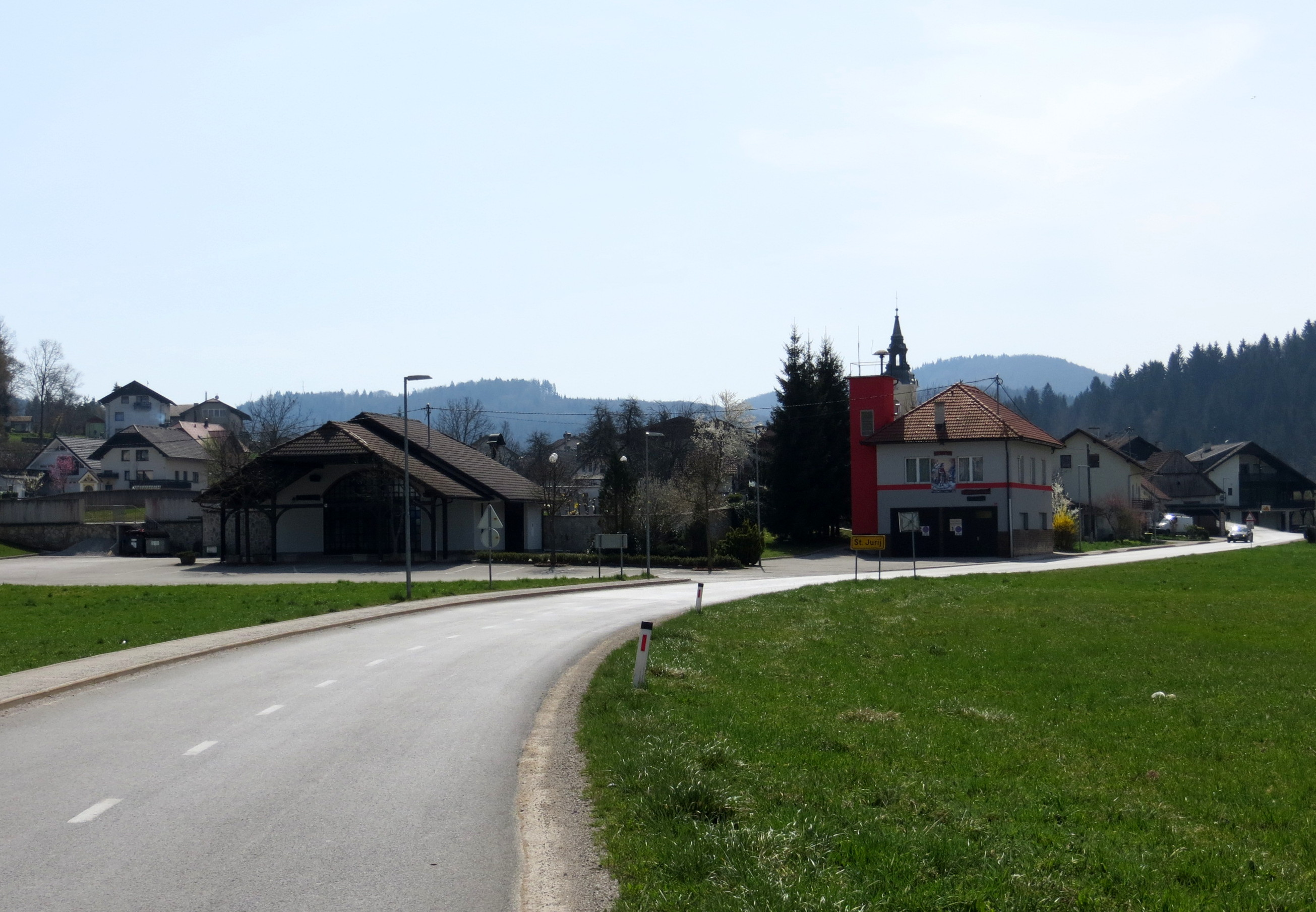

- Location in Slovenia
- Coordinates: 45°55′35.37″N 14°37′16.23″E
- Country: Slovenia
- Traditional region: Lower Carniola
- Statistical region: Central Slovenia
- Municipality: Grosuplje

Area
  - Total: 1.18 km^{2} (0.46 sq mi)
- Elevation: 342.2 m (1,123 ft)

Population (2002)
  - Total: 308

Šent Jurij (pronounced [ˈʃɛnt ˈjuːɾii̯]; German: Sankt Georgen, commonly abbreviated as Št. Jurij) is a village in the Municipality of Grosuplje in central Slovenia. The area is part of the historical region of Lower Carniola. The municipality is now included in the Central Slovenia Statistical Region.

== Name ==
The name of the settlement was changed from Sveti Jurij pri Grosupljem (literally, 'Saint George near Grosuplje') to Podtabor pri Grosupljem (literally, 'below the fort near Grosuplje') in 1952. The name was changed on the basis of the 1948 Law on Names of Settlements and Designations of Squares, Streets, and Buildings as part of efforts by Slovenia's postwar communist government to remove religious elements from toponyms. The name was restored as Šent Jurij in 1992.

== Church ==
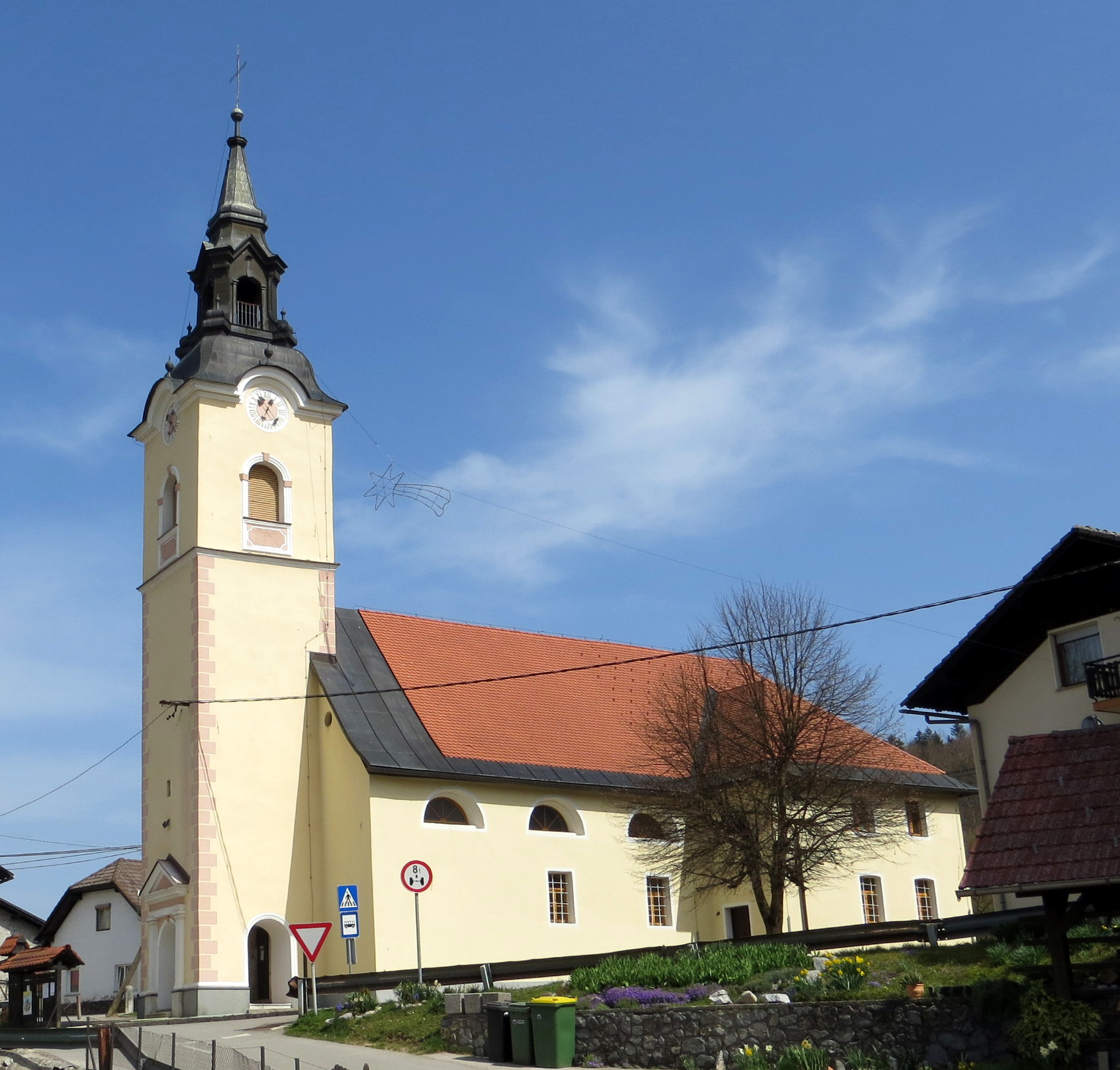
Saint George's Church

The parish church from which the settlement gets its name is dedicated to Saint George (Slovene: sveti Jurij) and belongs to the Roman Catholic Archdiocese of Ljubljana. It is a Gothic building that was restyled and rebuilt in 18th and 19th centuries.
