= Razdrto =

Razdrto may refer to:

Slovenia

- Razdrto, Grosuplje, a former village, now part of Šmarje–Sap
- Razdrto, Postojna, a village near Postojna
- Razdrto, Šentjernej, a village near Šentjernej

Croatia

- Razdrto, Croatia, a village near Brod Moravice
- Razdrto Tuheljsko, a village near Kumrovec
