= Veliki Lipoglav =

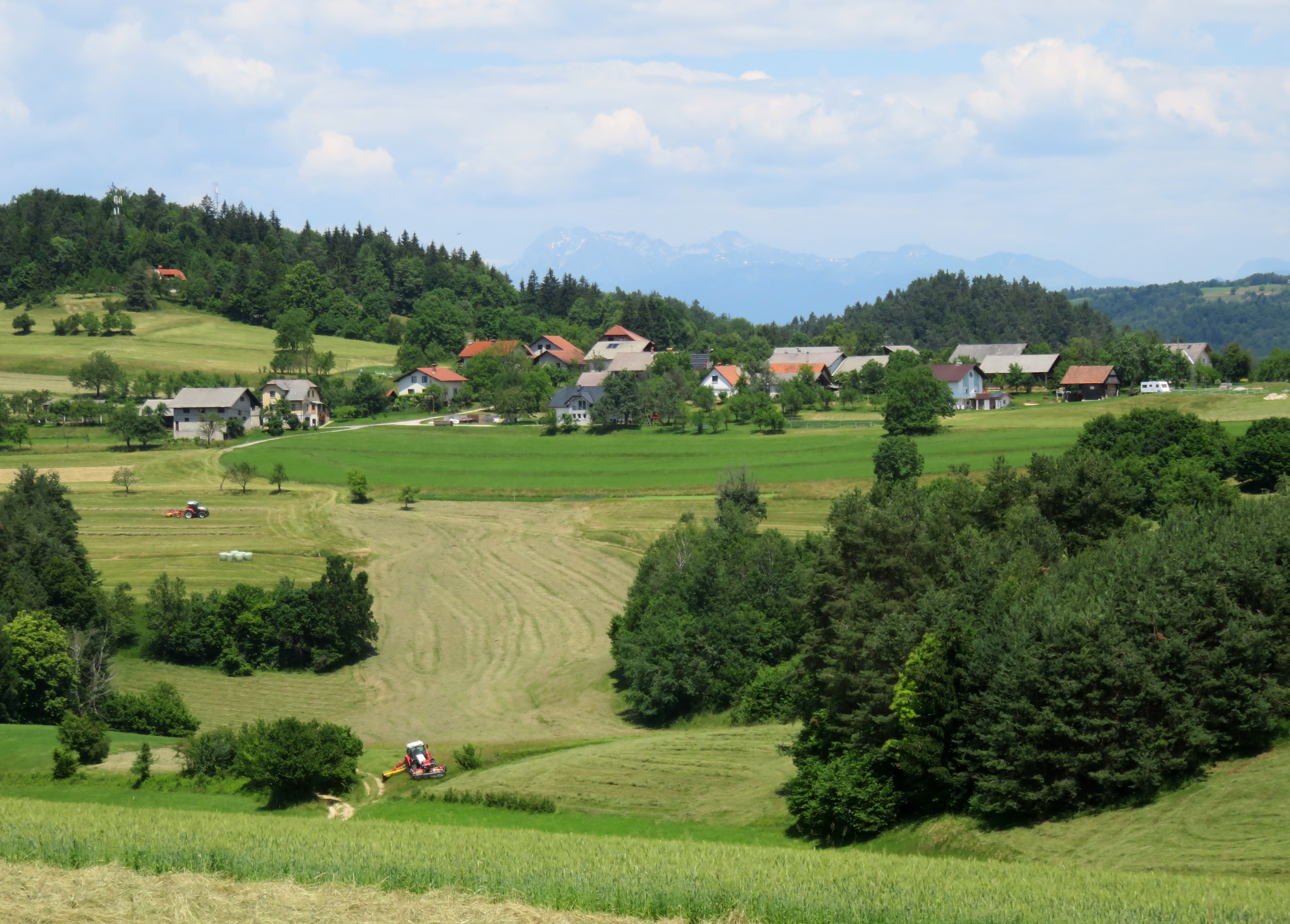
- Veliki Lipoglav

- Location in Slovenia
- Coordinates: 45°59′57.71″N 14°38′44.15″E
- Country: Slovenia
- Traditional region: Lower Carniola
- Statistical region: Central Slovenia
- Municipality: Ljubljana

Area
  - Total: 2.2 km^{2} (0.85 sq mi)
- Elevation: 532.2 m (1,746 ft)

Population (2002)
  - Total: 49
- Postal code: 1293

Veliki Lipoglav (pronounced [ˈʋeːliki ˈliːpɔɡlau̯]; also archaic Lipoglov, German: Lipoglou or Großlipoglau) is a small settlement in the hills southeast of Ljubljana in central Slovenia. It belongs to the City Municipality of Ljubljana and is part of the traditional region of Lower Carniola. It is now included with the rest of the municipality in the Central Slovenia Statistical Region.

== Name ==
The name Veliki Lipoglav literally means 'big Lipoglav' (in contrast to the neighboring village of Mali Lipoglav 'little Lipoglav'). The name was first attested in 1169 as Luppoglau (and as Lipoglaw in 1256, Luppoglau in 1321, Luppoglaw in 1467, and Lippa in 1763–1787). The name appears to be a compound of lipa 'linden' + glava 'hilltop', supposedly meaning 'hilltop covered with linden trees.' However, the early attestations of the name indicate that it is actually derived from *Lupoglav, presumably from *lupъ 'bare, exposed', thus meaning 'bare hilltop'. In the past the German name was Großlipoglau.

== History ==
A path leads from Veliki Lipoglav to nearby Pugled Hill (615 m), where there is a prehistoric burial mound.

During the Second World War, the first locals joined the Partisan forces on 13 July 1941. A battalion was formed and spent the winter in tents until it was attacked by Italian forces on 23 March 1942. The Partisans evaded the encircled forces and escaped through the railway tunnel in Šmarje to Lower Carniola. Italian forces burned one house in Veliki Lipoglav and killed all the men in three houses on 24 March 1942. The second group of detachments of the Slovene Partisans was established in April 1942 on Pugled Hill. A commemorative stone marks the site.

== Gallery ==
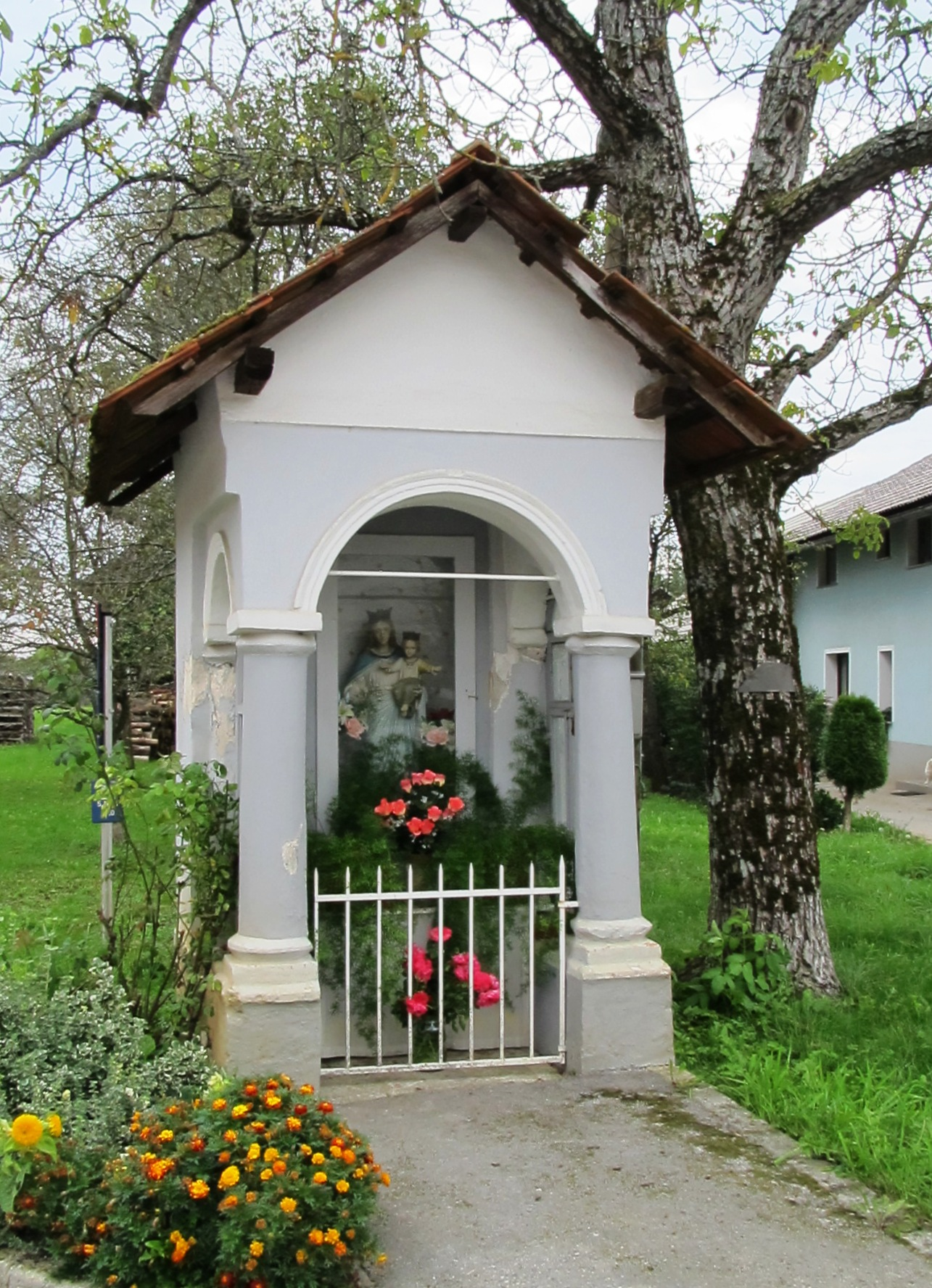
Chapel-shrine in Veliki Lipoglav

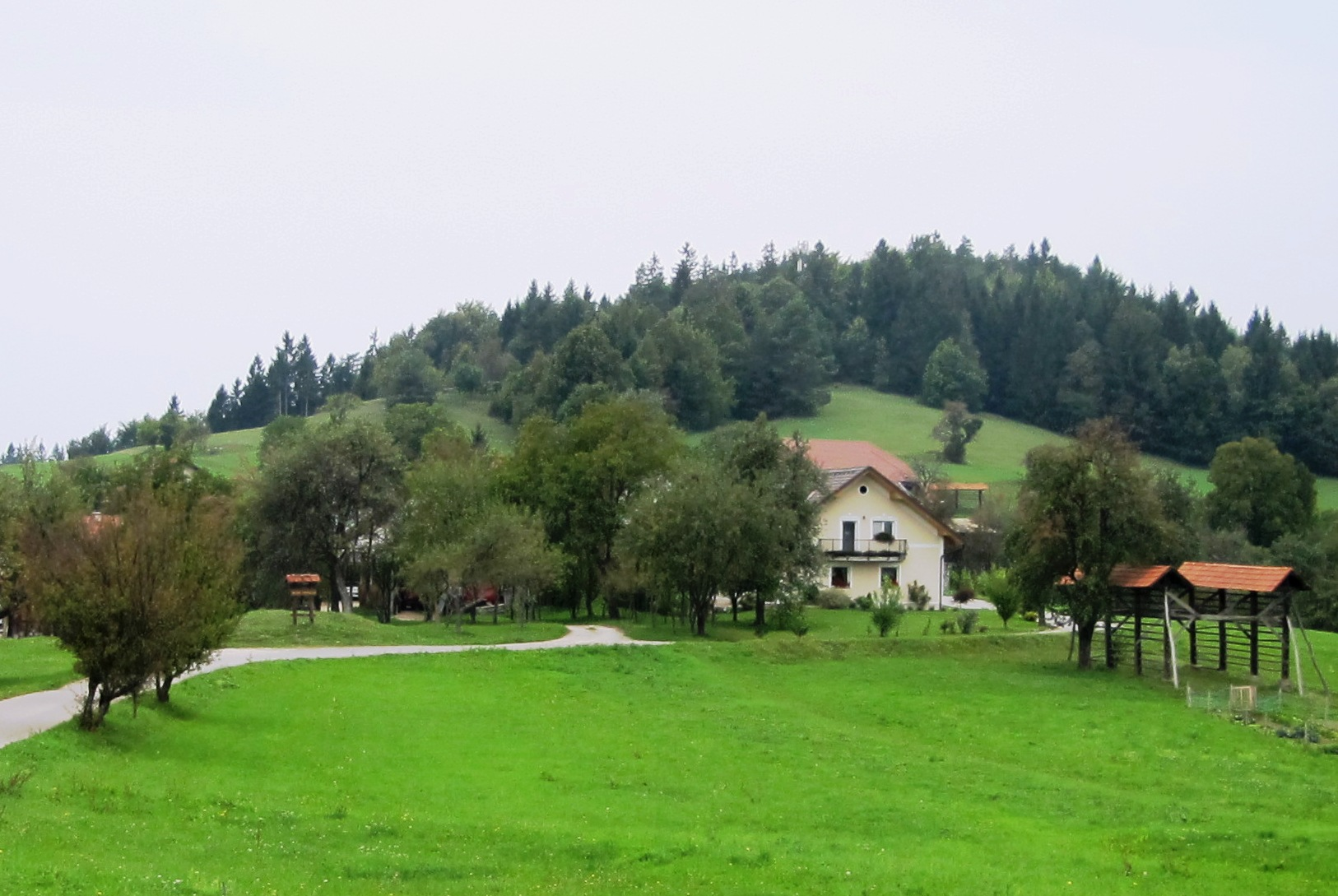
Veliki Lipoglav
