= Razdrto, Grosuplje =

Razdrto
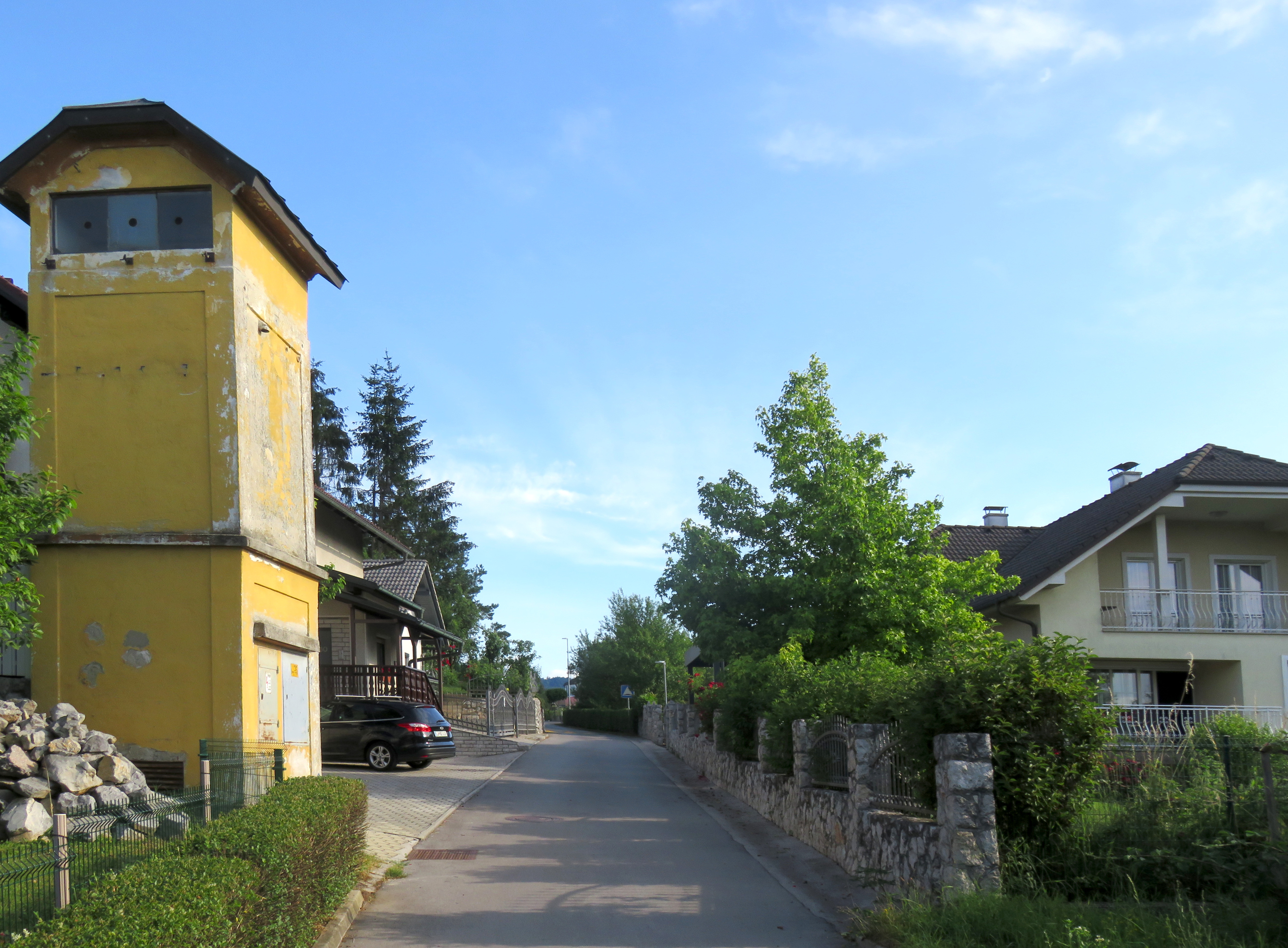

- Location in Slovenia
- Coordinates: 45°58′43″N 14°36′02″E
- Country: Slovenia
- Traditional region: Lower Carniola
- Statistical region: Central Slovenia
- Municipality: Grosuplje
- Elevation: 350 m (1,150 ft)

Razdrto (pronounced [ɾaˈzdərtɔ]; in older sources also Razderto, German: Resdertu) is a formerly independent settlement in the western part of the settlement of Šmarje–Sap in central Slovenia. It belongs to the Municipality of Grosuplje. It is part of the traditional region of Lower Carniola and is now included with the rest of the municipality in the Central Slovenia Statistical Region.

== Geography ==
Razdrto is a scattered village along the old road from Šmarje to Ljubljana and the parallel road from Tlake. Cankrmanka Hill (elevation: 385 meters or 1,263 feet), where there are low-quality hayfields, rises above the village. Vir Creek starts below the hill at a spring below the railroad tracks; the abandoned Podježar Mill stands along the creek. The hamlet of London stands in the southeast part of the village, near the Drča gravel pit.

== Name ==
The name Razdrto is shared with other settlements in Slovenia. It is derived from Slavic *orzdьrto(je) (poľe) 'cleared (field)', referring to early settlement and agricultural use of the area.

== History ==
The Fortun Inn was located in Razdrto; it was a stopping point for teamsters before the railroad was built. In the summer of 1944, the Partisans dynamited the railroad tunnel in Razdrto, but the damage was minimal.

Razdrto had a population of 64 living in 14 houses in 1870, 84 living in 14 houses in 1880, 92 living in 15 houses in 1890, and 62 living in 12 houses in 1900. Razdrto was annexed by Šmarje–Sap in 1971, ending its existence as a separate settlement.

== Church ==
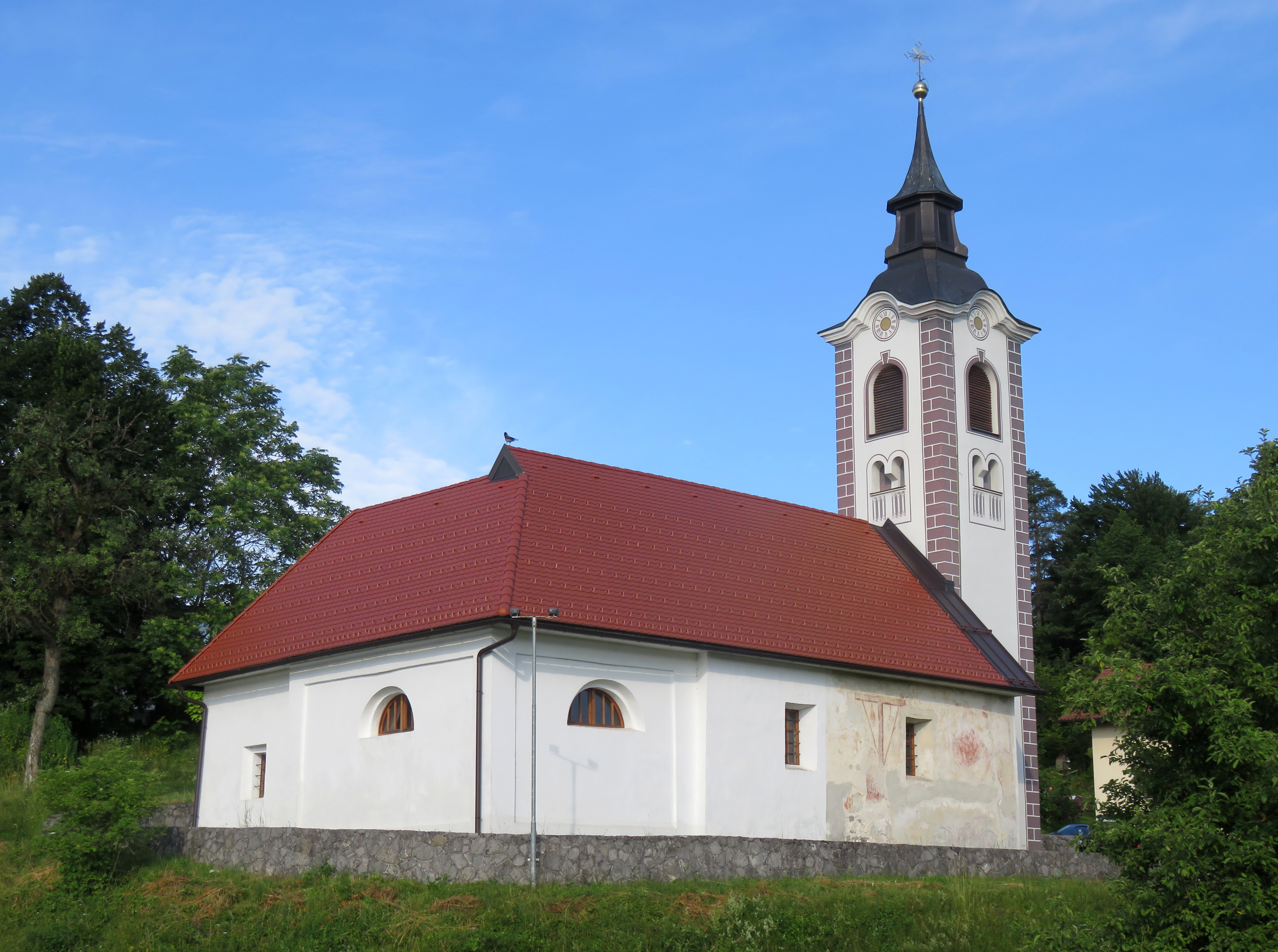
Holy Cross Church

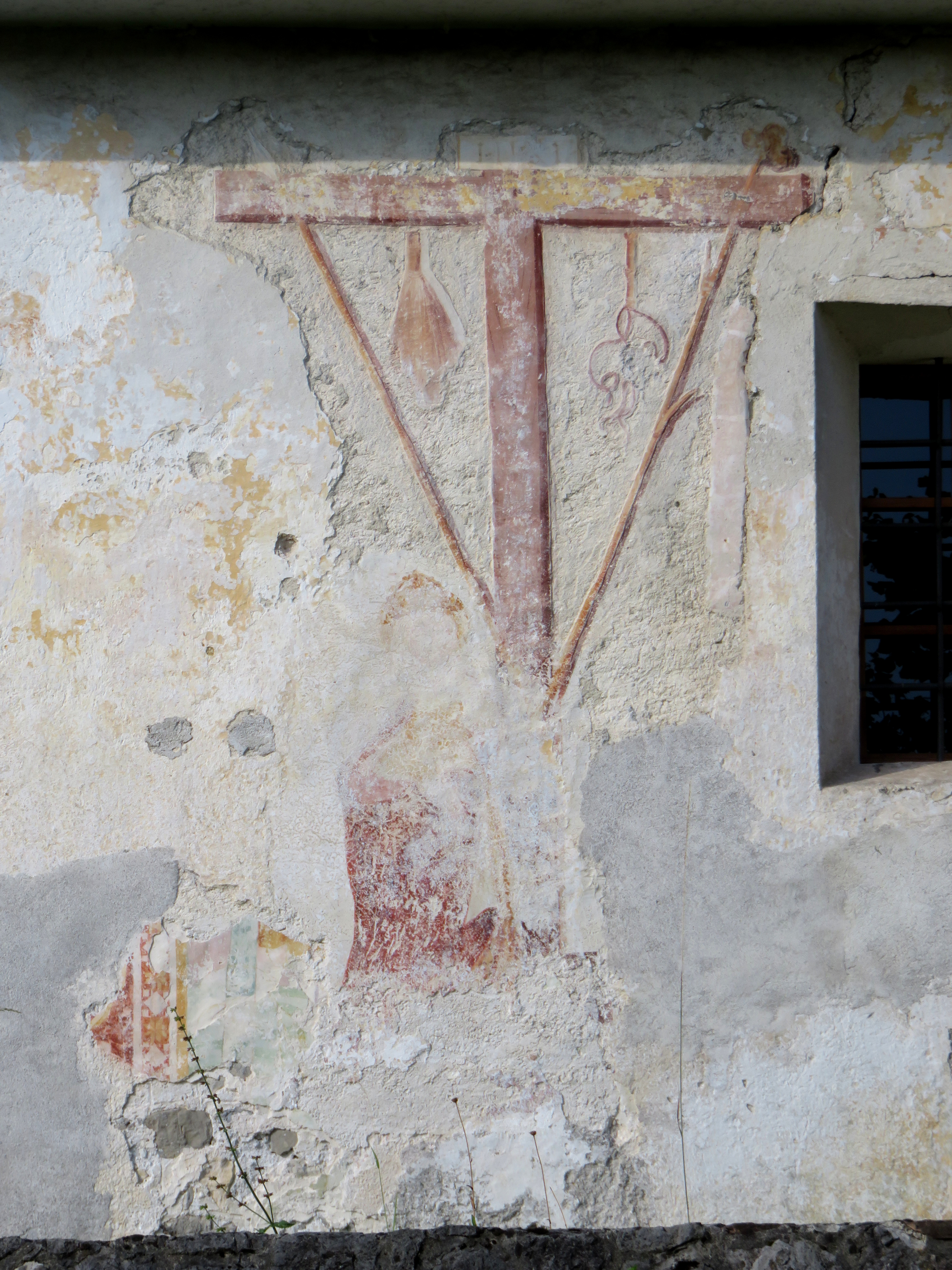
Exterior frescoes

The church in Razdrto is dedicated to the Holy Cross. It is a single-nave structure with a Romanesque nave, a Baroque chancel, and a sacristy dating from the 19th century. There are two layers of frescoes on the north exterior wall, dating from c. 1400 and from the early 16th century. The altar dates from the 19th century. Part of a Roman gravestone is built into the south wall of the church; the section of the gravestone with the relief of a dolphin serves as the plinth of the altar table.

== Cultural heritage ==
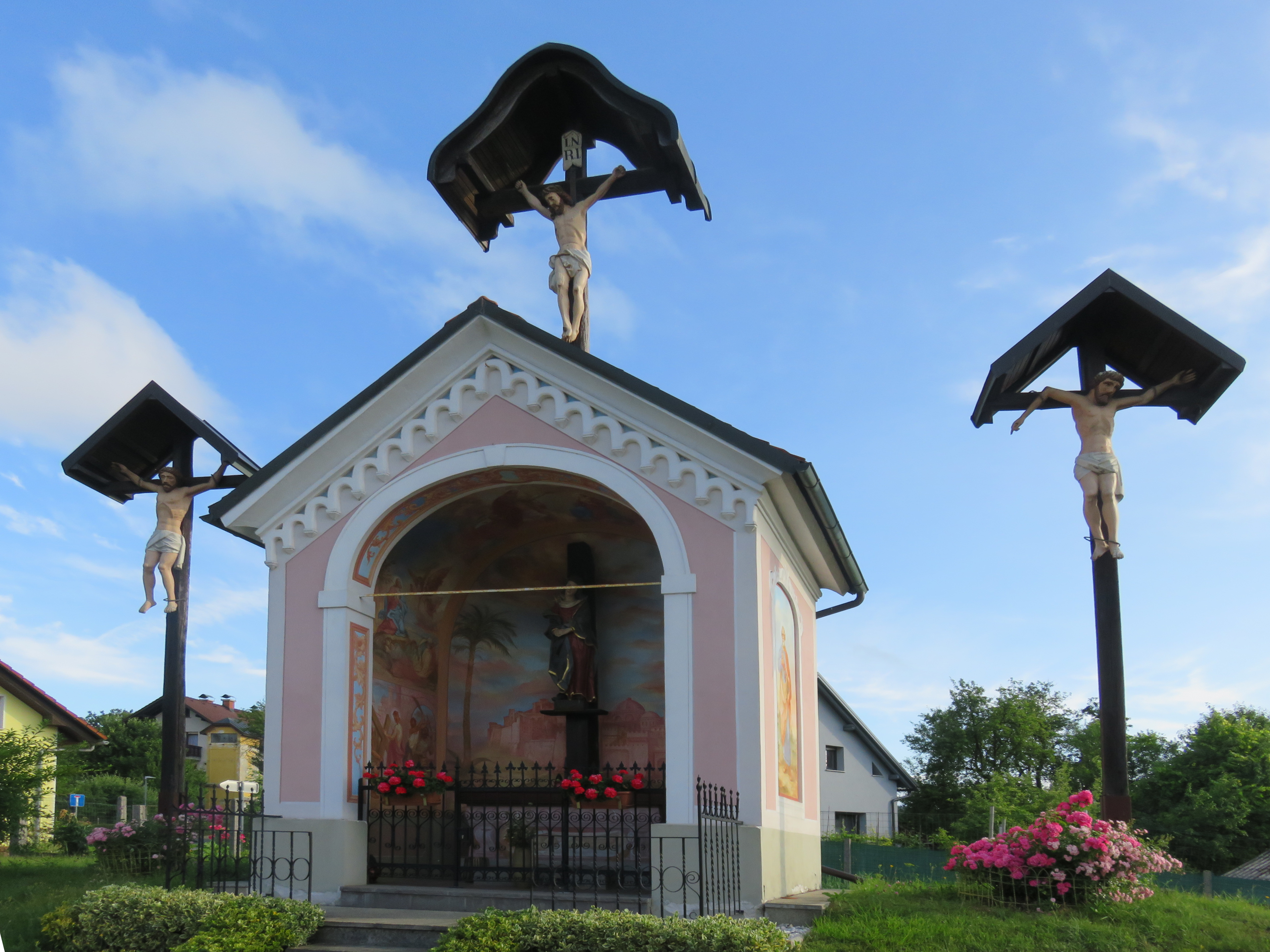
Calvary shrine

In addition to the village church, there is a Calvary shrine in the village northeast of the church. The shrine is decorated with frescoes from the 19th century and it contains a statue of the Virgin Mary from the 18th century. Three crosses stand next to the shrine.

== Notable people ==
Notable people that were born or lived in Razdrto include:

- Viktor Eržen (1857–1881), translator
- Stanko Svetina (1888–1919), poet and translator
