= Sap, Grosuplje =

Sap
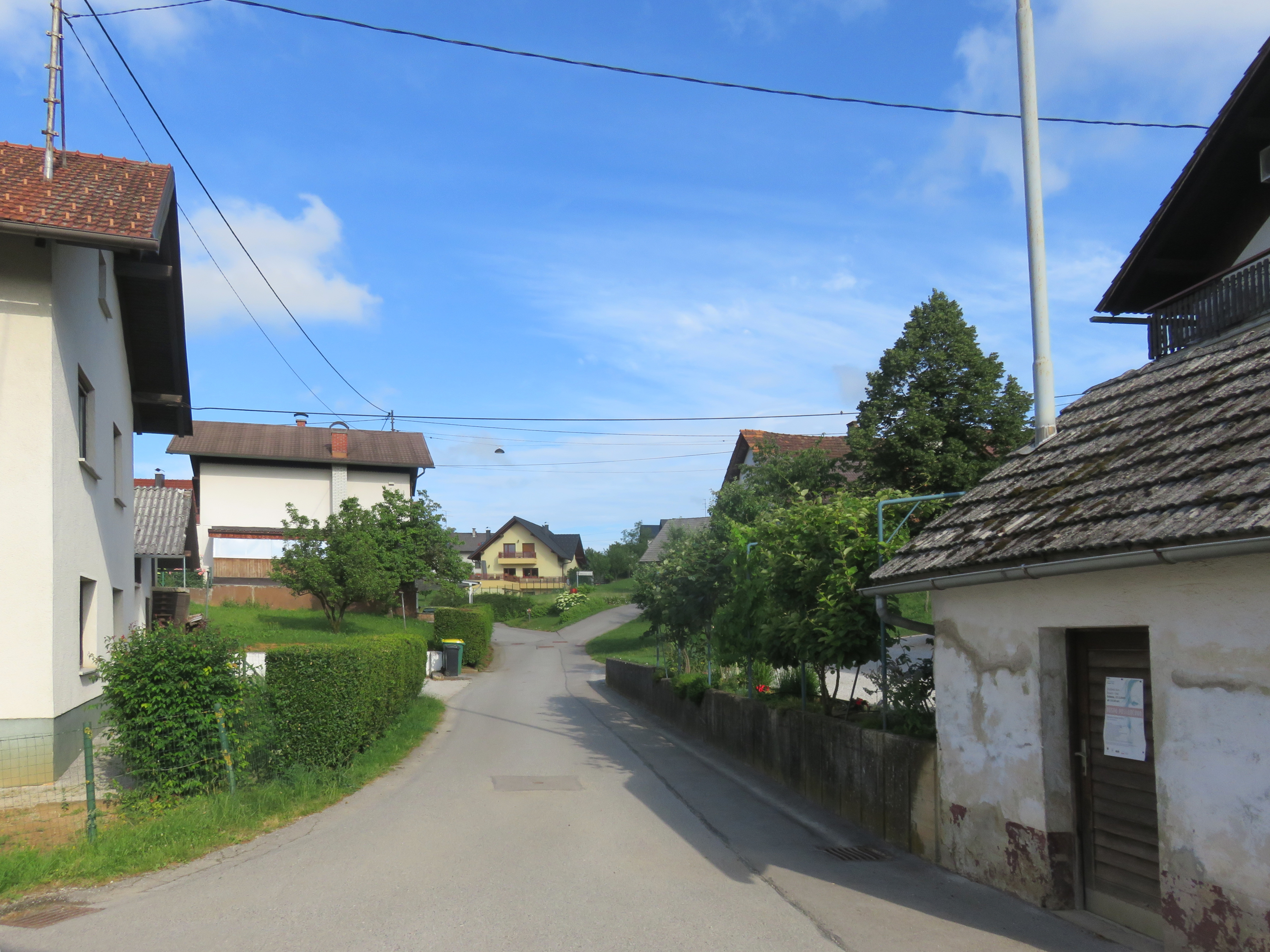

- Location in Slovenia
- Coordinates: 45°58′20″N 14°37′12″E
- Country: Slovenia
- Traditional region: Lower Carniola
- Statistical region: Central Slovenia
- Municipality: Grosuplje
- Elevation: 345 m (1,132 ft)

Sap (pronounced [ˈsaːp]) is a formerly independent settlement in the eastern part of the settlement of Šmarje–Sap in central Slovenia. It belongs to the Municipality of Grosuplje. It is part of the traditional region of Lower Carniola and is now included with the rest of the municipality in the Central Slovenia Statistical Region.

== Geography ==
The old village center of Sap stands along the old road from Ljubljana to Grosuplje on the northeast slope of Globošček Hill (elevation: 401 meters or 1,316 feet). Newer houses stand to the northwest. The Mahovje meadows lie below the settlement to the north, near the railroad. The Vodotuča Valley lies north of the railroad, where there are more meadows and tilled fields.

== Name ==
The settlement was attested in 1763–1787 as Sapp oder Ispe (the latter is a genitive form, iz Spa 'from Sap'). The name is derived from the Slovene common noun sap 'embankment'.

== History ==
Sap had a population of 146 living in 30 houses in 1870, 135 living in 26 houses in 1880, 157 living in 26 houses in 1890, and 142 living in 28 houses in 1900. Sap was merged with the neighboring village of Šmarje in 1961 to create the settlement of Šmarje–Sap, ending its existence as a separate settlement.

== Notable people ==
Notable people that were born or lived in Sap include the following:

- Matevž Kračman (1773–1853), poet, organist, and teacher
