= Mali Lipoglav =

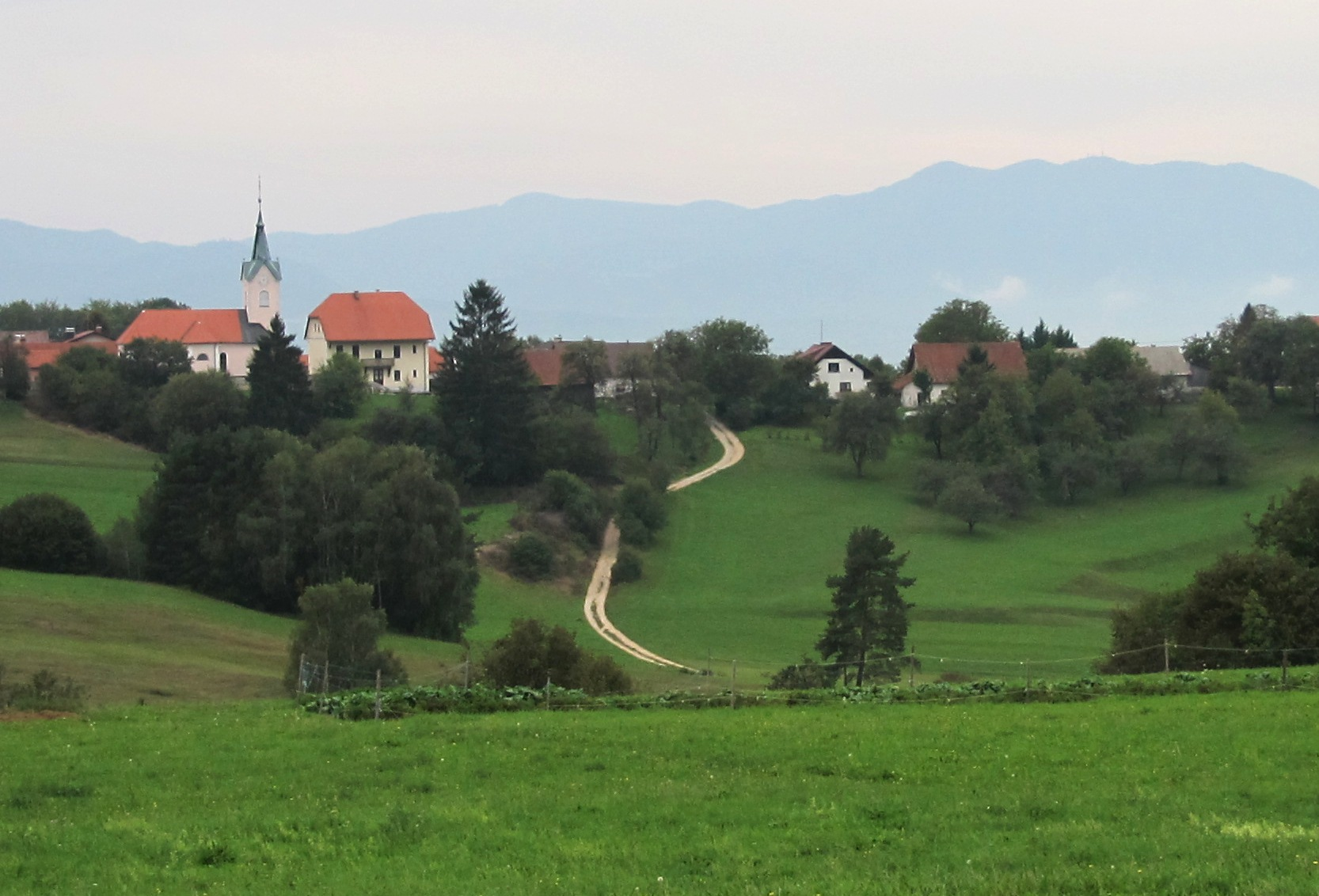
- Mali Lipoglav

- Location in Slovenia
- Coordinates: 45°59′35.02″N 14°38′39.65″E
- Country: Slovenia
- Traditional region: Lower Carniola
- Statistical region: Central Slovenia
- Municipality: Ljubljana

Area
  - Total: 1.56 km^{2} (0.60 sq mi)
- Elevation: 529 m (1,736 ft)

Population (2002)
  - Total: 171
- Postal code: 1293

Mali Lipoglav (pronounced [ˈmaːli ˈliːpɔɡlau̯]; also archaic Lipoglov, German: Lipoglou or Kleinlipoglau) is a settlement in central Slovenia. It lies in the hills southeast of the capital Ljubljana and belongs to the City Municipality of Ljubljana. It is part of the traditional region of Lower Carniola and is now included with the rest of the municipality in the Central Slovenia Statistical Region.

== Name ==
The name Mali Lipoglav literally means 'little Lipoglav' (in contrast to the neighboring village of Veliki Lipoglav 'big Lipoglav'). The name was first attested in 1169 as Luppoglau (and as Lipoglaw in 1256, Luppoglau in 1321, Luppoglaw in 1467, and Lippa in 1763–1787). The name appears to be a compound of lipa 'linden' + glava 'hilltop', supposedly meaning 'hilltop covered with linden trees.' However, the early attestations of the name indicate that it is actually derived from *Lupoglav, presumably from *lupъ 'bare, exposed', thus meaning 'bare hilltop'. In the past the German name was Kleinlipoglau.

== History ==
The remains of a prehistoric Celtic trench were discovered at the Janez Bozja farm. Mali Lipoglav became the seat of a parish in 1782. A part-time school operated in Mali Lipoglav from 1865 until 1910, when a regular school was established. Lessons took place in the rectory until 1938, when a school building was established. The school building was burned in 1942 and rebuilt in 1946. Italian forces burned one house and three outbuildings in the village on 23 March 1942.

== Church ==
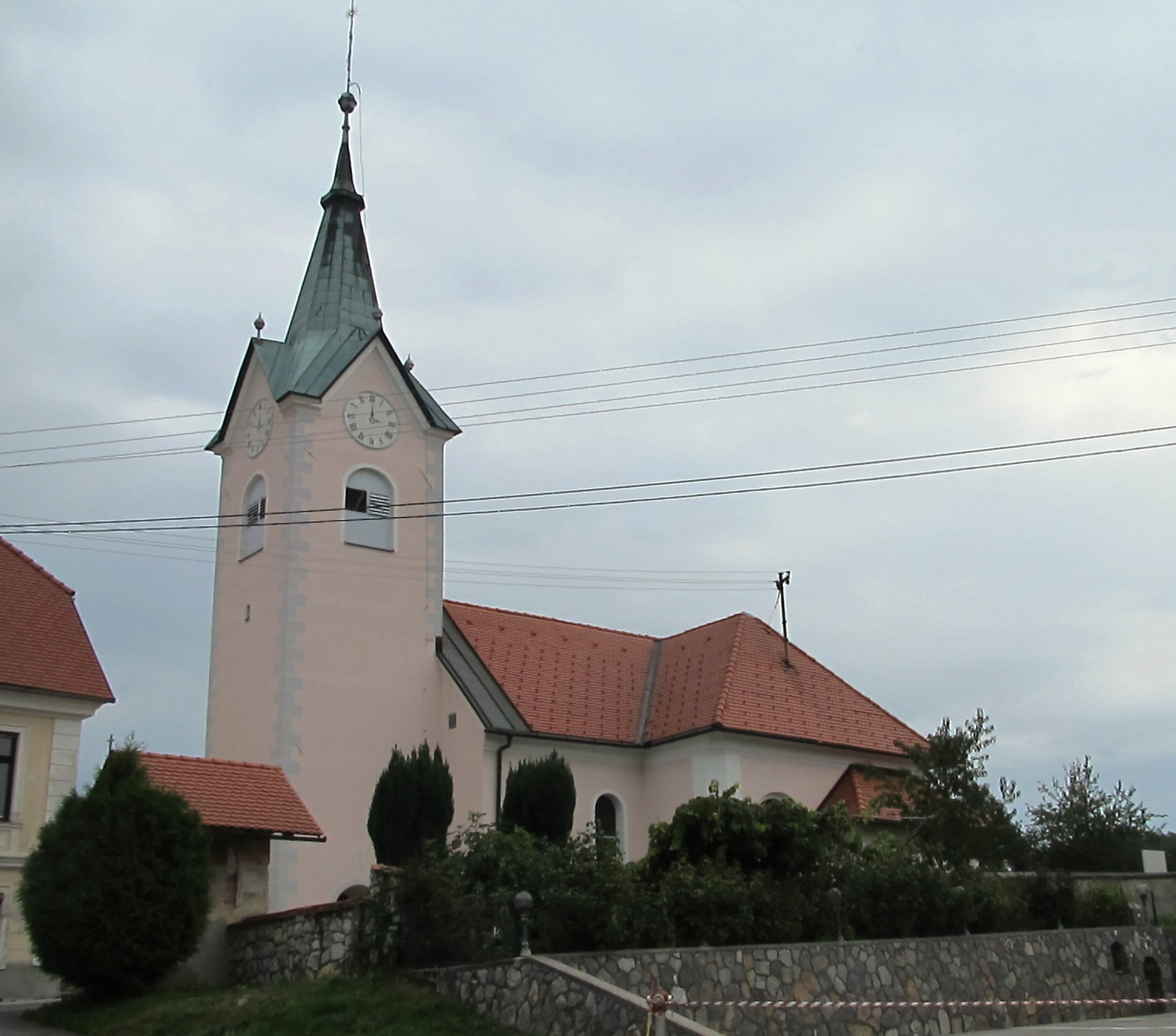
Saint Nicholas' Church

The local parish church is dedicated to Saint Nicholas and belongs to the Roman Catholic Archdiocese of Ljubljana. It was first mentioned in written documents dating to 1290, but was extensively rebuilt in the 18th and 19th centuries. The main altar is the work of Matija Tomc and dates from 1863. It features a painting by Valentin Metzinger. The altars in the side chapels date from the first half of the 18th century. The Stations of the Cross were painted by Janez Potočnik in 1831.

== Notable people ==
Notable people that were born or lived in Mali Lipoglav include:

- Anton Grum (1877–1975), composer
- Frančišek Marešič (1846–1901), priest and religious writer

== Gallery ==
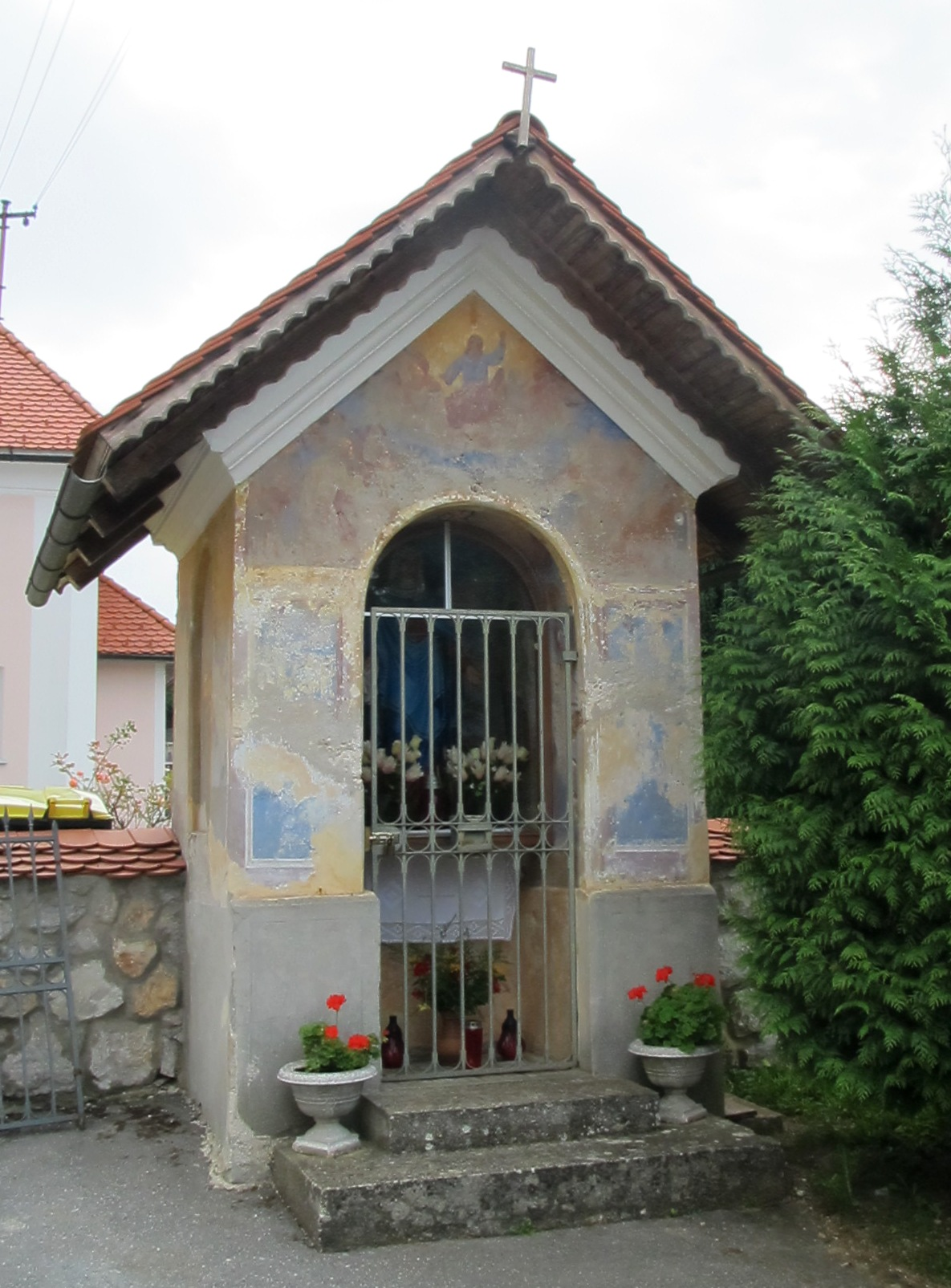
Cemetery chapel-shrine

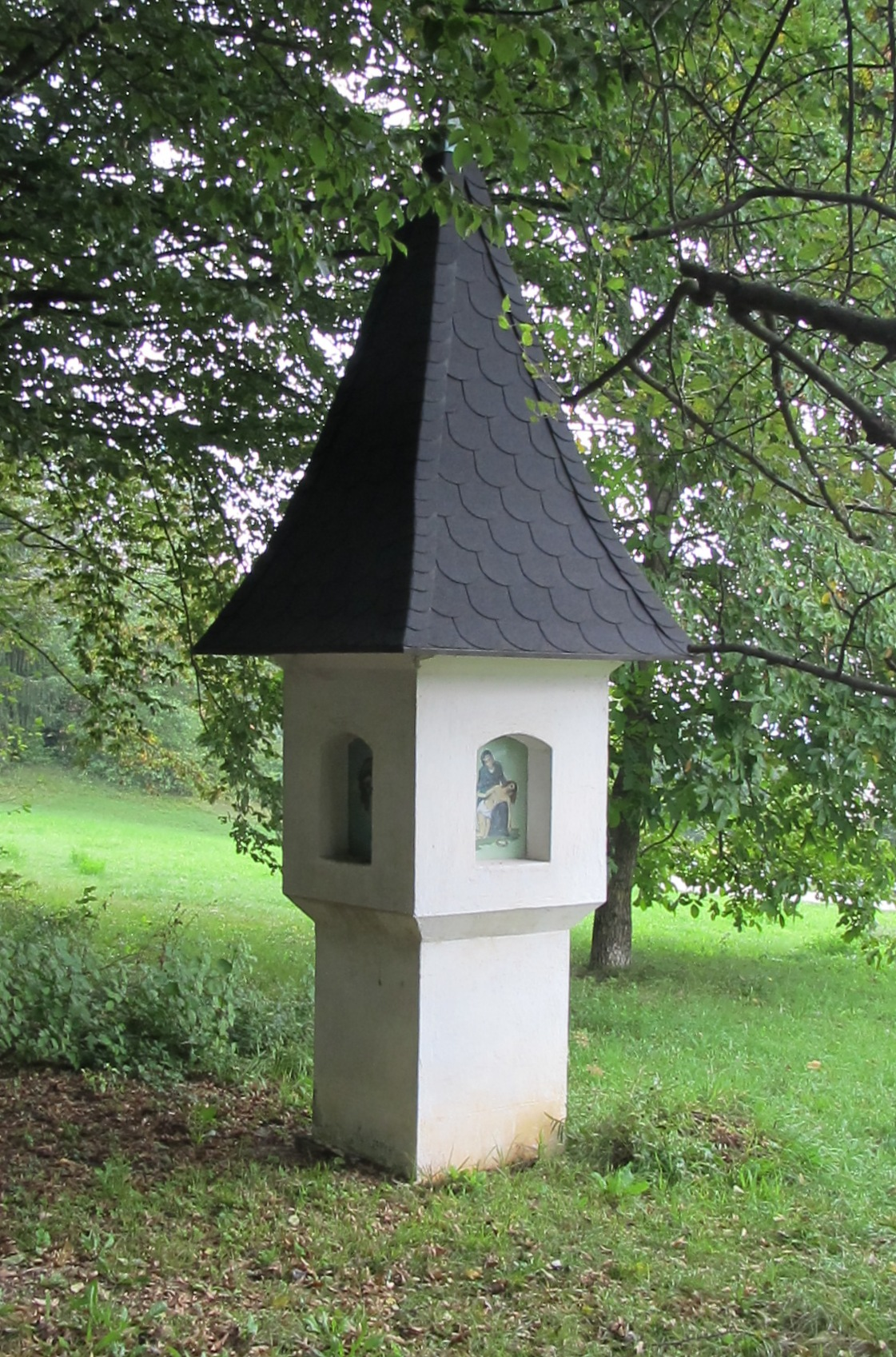
Wayside shrine

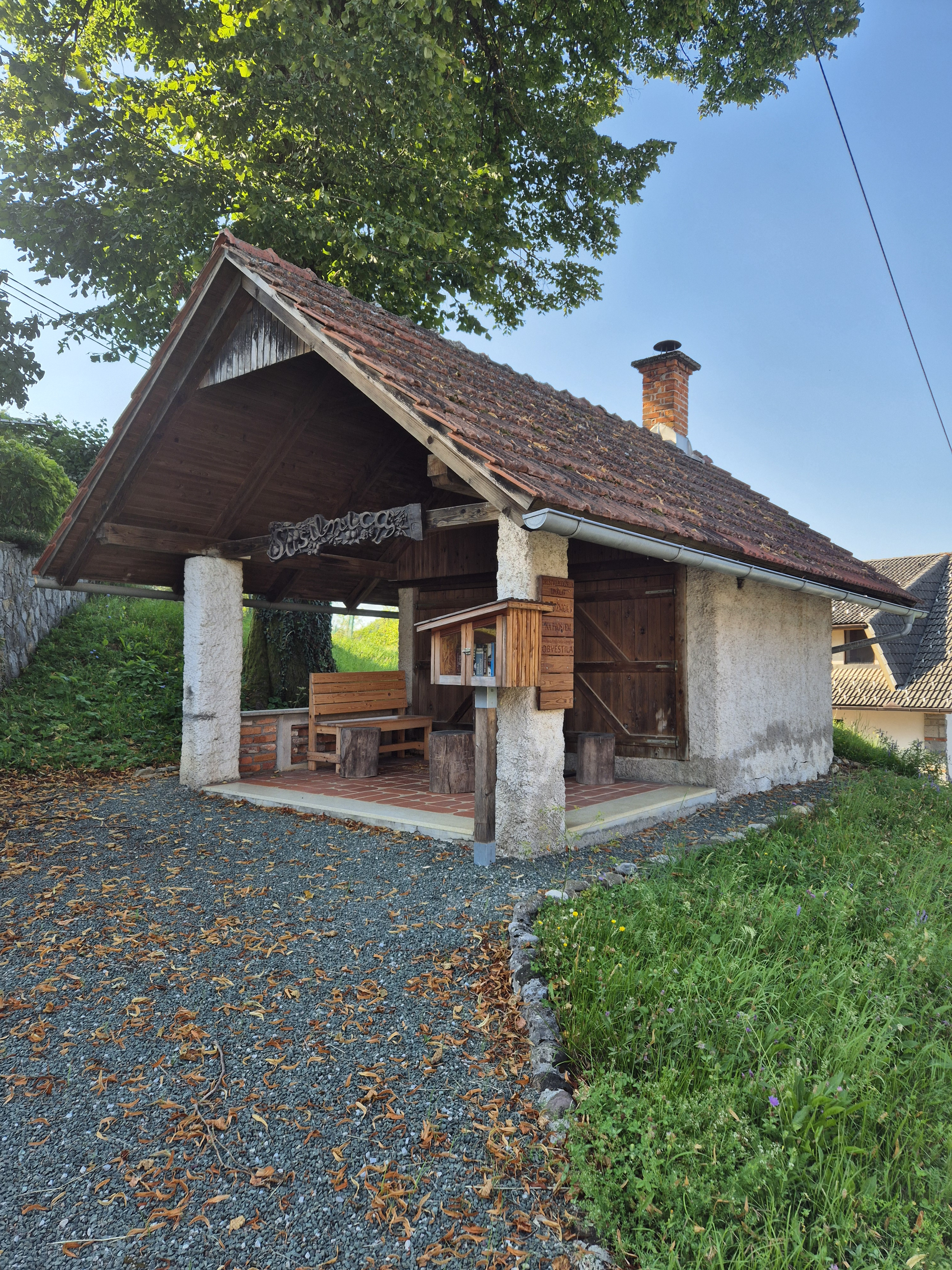
The fruit drying house in Mali Lipoglav, built in 1937 and restored in 1999–2001
