= Šmarje, Grosuplje =

Šmarje
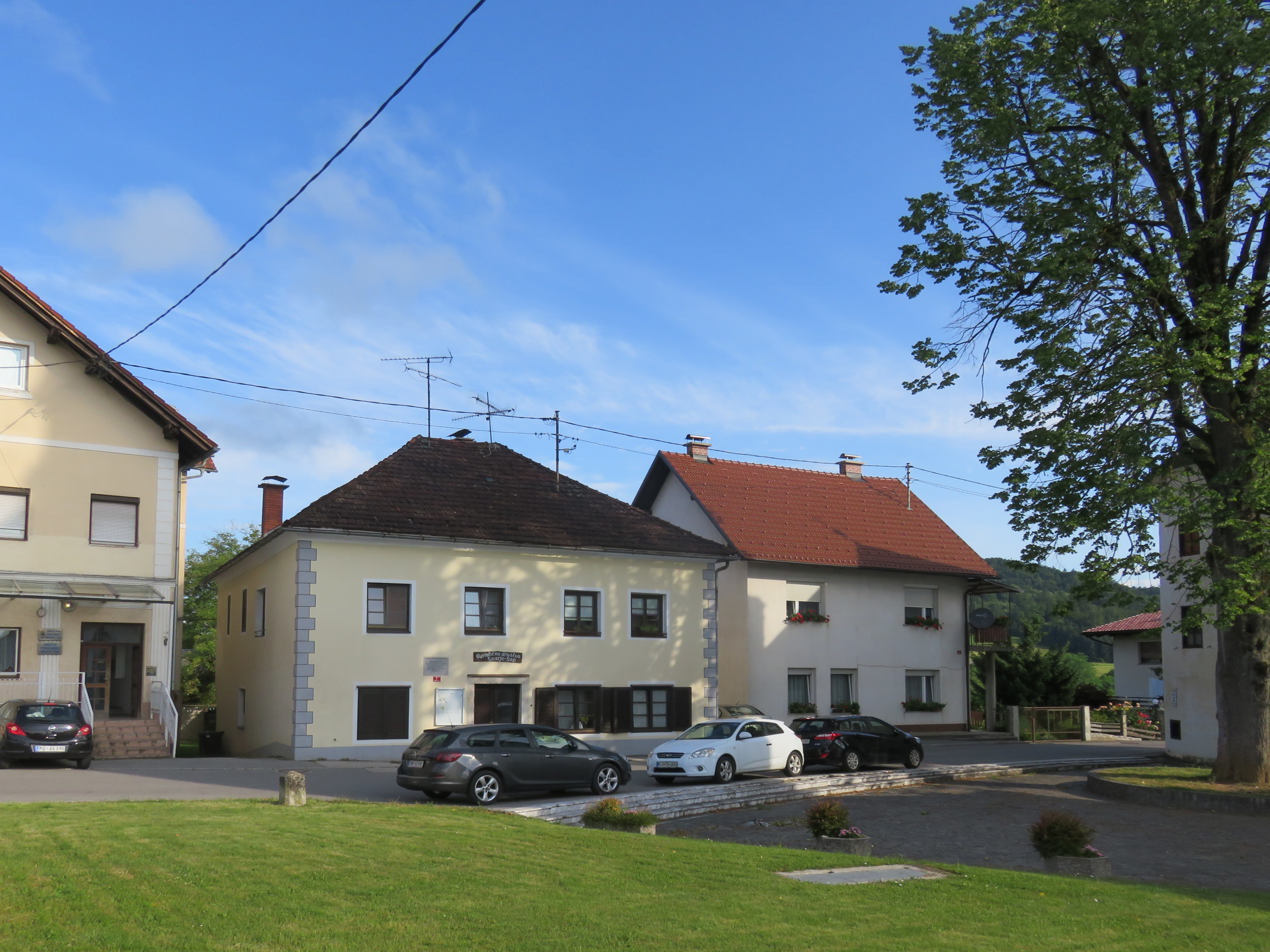

- Location in Slovenia
- Coordinates: 45°58′34″N 14°36′40″E
- Country: Slovenia
- Traditional region: Lower Carniola
- Statistical region: Central Slovenia
- Municipality: Grosuplje
- Elevation: 353 m (1,158 ft)

Šmarje (pronounced [ˈʃmaːɾjɛ], German: Sankt Marein) is a formerly independent settlement in the western part of the settlement of Šmarje–Sap in central Slovenia. It belongs to the Municipality of Grosuplje. It is part of the traditional region of Lower Carniola and is now included with the rest of the municipality in the Central Slovenia Statistical Region.

== Name ==
The settlement was attested in 1347 as sand Marien (and as sancta Maria in 1349 and Smariach in 1436, among other names). The Slovene name Šmarje is a contraction of the old locative form *šent Marije '(at) Saint Mary', referring to the local church.

== History ==
Šmarje had a population of 160 living in 32 houses in 1870, 146 living in 29 houses in 1880, 145 living in 29 houses in 1890, and 170 living in 30 houses in 1900. Šmarje was merged with the neighboring village of Sap in 1961 to create the settlement of Šmarje–Sap, ending its existence as a separate settlement.

== Notable people ==
Notable people that were born or lived in Šmarje include the following:

- Jožef Ambrožič (1737 – after 1793), religious poet
- Konrad Črnologar (1860–1904), historian, lived the last years of his life in Šmarje
- Jožef Kerčon (1821–1903), religious writer
- Ivan Lah (1881–1938), writer, lived in Šmarje in his youth
- Gilbert Martinic (1752–1809), religious writer
- Anton Medved (1869–1910), poet and playwright, lived in Šmarje from 1894 to 1896
- Stane Mikuž (1913–1985), art historian
- Janez Perovšek, nom de guerre Pelko (1921–1993), children's writer and journalist
- Ivan Zorman (1889–1957), poet, translator, and composer
- Janez Zupančič (1819–1895), religious writer
