= Šmarje–Sap =

Šmarje–Sap Šmarje - Sap
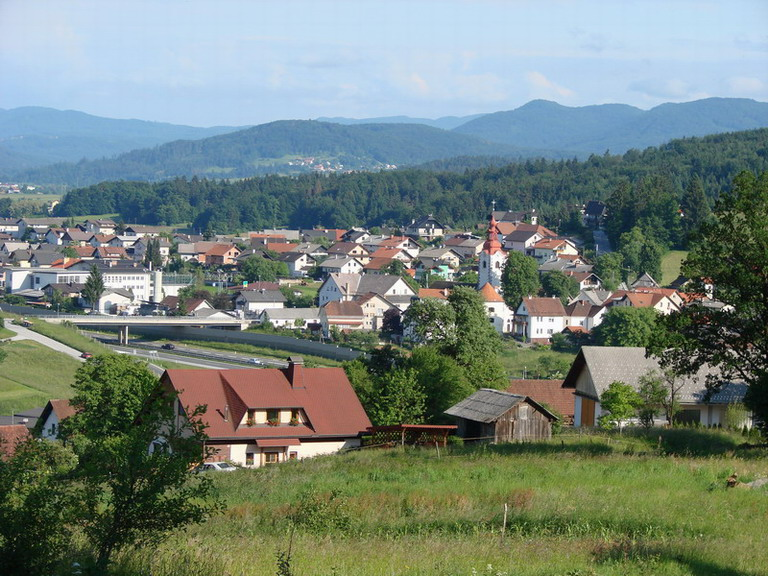

- Location in Slovenia
- Coordinates: 45°58′33.73″N 14°36′38.78″E
- Country: Slovenia
- Traditional region: Lower Carniola
- Statistical region: Central Slovenia
- Municipality: Grosuplje

Area
  - Total: 3.76 km^{2} (1.45 sq mi)
- Elevation: 348 m (1,142 ft)

Population (2012)
  - Total: 1,512
  - Density: 403/km^{2} (1,040/sq mi)

Šmarje–Sap (pronounced [ˈʃmaːɾjɛ ˈsaːp]; Slovene: Šmarje - Sap) is a settlement in the Municipality of Grosuplje in central Slovenia. The area is part of the historical region of Lower Carniola. The municipality is now included in the Central Slovenia Statistical Region.

== Name ==
Šmarje–Sap is a compound name. The first part of the name, Šmarje, was attested in 1347 as sand Marien (and as sancta Maria in 1349 and Smariach in 1436, among other names). It is a contraction of the old locative form *šent Marije '(at) Saint Mary', referring to the local church. The second part of the name, Sap, was attested in 1763–1787 as Sapp oder Ispe (the latter is a genitive form, iz Spa 'from Sap'). The name is derived from the Slovene common noun sap 'embankment'.

== History ==
Šmarje–Sap was created as a settlement in 1961 through the merger of the formerly separate villages of Šmarje and Sap.

== Landmarks ==
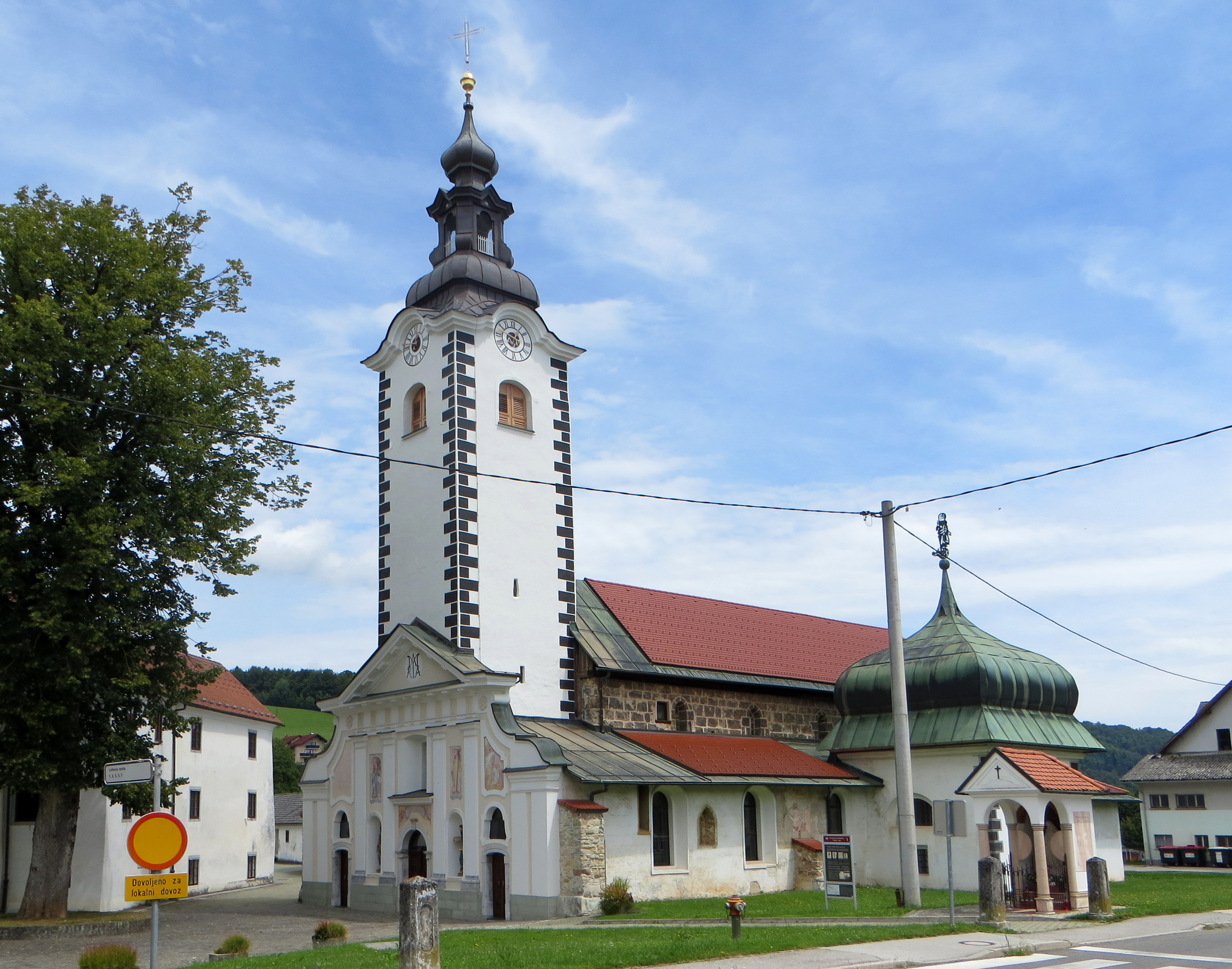
Nativity of Mary Church

The parish church from which the settlement gets its name is dedicated to the Nativity of the Virgin Mary and belongs to the Roman Catholic Archdiocese of Ljubljana. It is a 13th-century Romanesque building that was extended and restyled over the centuries. A defence tower that was part of a defence enclosure round the church erected to protect the local population against Ottoman raids survives.
